= List of Michigan Wolverines baseball seasons =

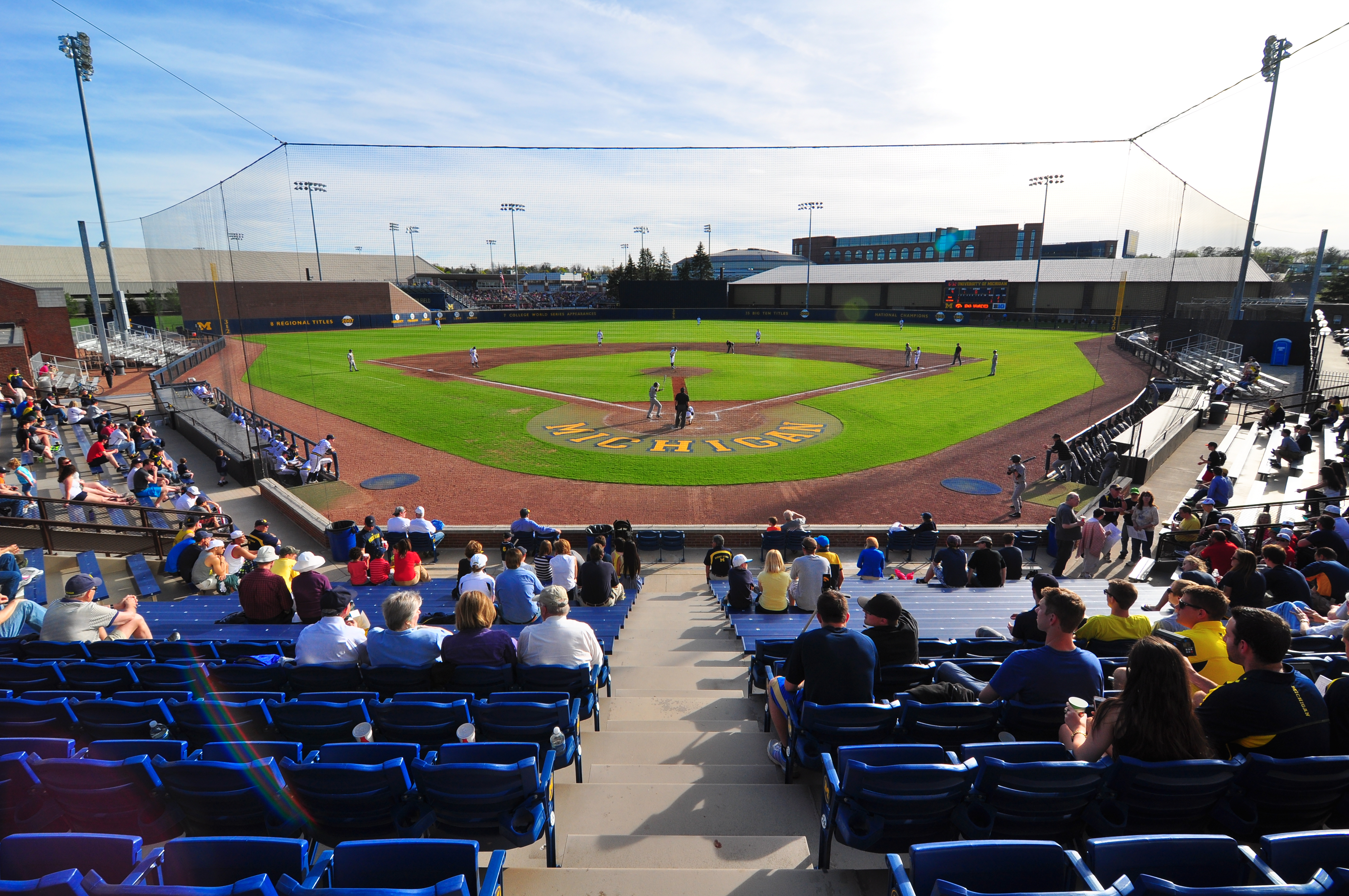
Ray Fisher Stadium

This is a list of Michigan Wolverines baseball seasons. The Michigan Wolverines baseball program is a college baseball team that represents the University of Michigan in the Big Ten Conference of the National Collegiate Athletic Association. Michigan has played their home games at Ray Fisher Stadium in Ann Arbor, Michigan since 1923.

The Wolverines have won 35 conference regular season championships, ten conference tournaments, and have appeared in the NCAA Division I Baseball Championship 26 times, advancing to the College World Series on eight occasions, and have won the national championship twice.

== Season results ==
National champions	College World Series berth	NCAA tournament berth	Conference Tournament champions	Conference/Division Regular season Champions

Season	Head coach	Conference	Season results									Tournament results		Final Poll (Note: Collegiate Baseball began team rankings in 1959. Baseball America began in 1981. The Coaches' Poll (published by USA Today's Sports Weekly and ESPN) began in 1992.)		
Season	Head coach	Conference	Overall				Conference					Conference	Postseason (Note: Postseason play involving the NCAA Division I Baseball Championship began in 1947.)	BA	CB	Coaches
Season	Head coach	Conference	Wins	Losses	Ties	%	Wins	Losses	Ties	%	Finish	Conference	Postseason	BA	CB	Coaches
Michigan Wolverines
1866	No Coach		3	0	0	1.000	—	—	—	—	—	—	—	—	—	—
1867	No Coach		4	1	0	.800	—	—	—	—	—	—	—	—	—	—
1868	No Coach		2	0	0	1.000	—	—	—	—	—	—	—	—	—	—
1869	No records available															
1870	No records available															
1871	No records available															
1872	No Coach		1	0	0	1.000	—	—	—	—	—	—	—	—	—	—
1873	No records available															
1874	No records available															
1875	No Coach		2	2	0	.500	—	—	—	—	—	—	—	—	—	—
1876	No records available															
1877	No Coach		1	1	0	.500	—	—	—	—	—	—	—	—	—	—
1878	No Coach		1	0	0	1.000	—	—	—	—	—	—	—	—	—	—
1879	No records available															
1880	No Coach		2	4	0	.333	—	—	—	—	—	—	—	—	—	—
1881	No Coach		3	3	0	.500	—	—	—	—	—	—	—	—	—	—
1882	No Coach		10	3	0	.769	—	—	—	—	—	—	—	—	—	—
1883	No Coach		3	3	0	.500	—	—	—	—	—	—	—	—	—	—
1884	No Coach		8	1	1	.850	—	—	—	—	—	—	—	—	—	—
1885	No Coach		2	2	0	.667	—	—	—	—	—	—	—	—	—	—
1886	No Coach		5	2	0	.714	—	—	—	—	—	—	—	—	—	—
1887	No Coach		3	4	0	.429	—	—	—	—	—	—	—	—	—	—
1888	No Coach		6	3	1	.650	—	—	—	—	—	—	—	—	—	—
1889	No Coach		4	3	0	.571	—	—	—	—	—	—	—	—	—	—
1890	No Coach		8	3	0	.727	—	—	—	—	—	—	—	—	—	—
1891	Pete Conway		10	3	0	.769	—	—	—	—	—	—	—	—	—	—
1892	Pete Conway		12	6	1	.658	—	—	—	—	—	—	—	—	—	—
1893	No Coach		14	4	0	.778	—	—	—	—	—	—	—	—	—	—
1894	No Coach		11	8	0	.579	—	—	—	—	—	—	—	—	—	—
1895	No Coach		19	3	1	.848	—	—	—	—	—	—	—	—	—	—
1896	Frank Sexton	Western Conference	17	4	1	.848	6	3	0	.667	2nd	—	—	—	—	—
1897	Charles F. Watkins	Western Conference	4	8	0	.333	2	6	0	.250	4th	—	—	—	—	—
1898	Watkins / Clarke	Western Conference	15	6	0	.714	7	3	0	.700	2nd	—	—	—	—	—
1899	Henry Clarke	Western Conference	14	5	0	.737	5	2	0	.714	1st	—	—	—	—	—
1900	Charles F. Watkins	Big Nine	12	9	1	.568	6	5	0	.545	3rd	—	—	—	—	—
1901	Frank Sexton	Big Nine	13	8	0	.619	8	2	0	.800	1st	—	—	—	—	—
1902	Frank Sexton	Big Nine	8	10	0	.444	1	7	0	.125	5th	—	—	—	—	—
1903	R.C "Skel" Roach	Big Nine	12	5	0	.706	7	3	0	.700	2nd	—	—	—	—	—
1904	Jerome Utley	Big Nine	10	5	0	.667	4	5	0	.444	4th	—	—	—	—	—
1905	L.W. McAllister	Big Nine	16	3	0	.842	9	3	0	.750	1st	—	—	—	—	—
1906	L.W. McAllister	Big Nine	12	7	0	.632	5	3	0	.625	2nd	—	—	—	—	—
1907	R.L. Lowe		11	4	1	.719	—	—	—	—	—	—	—	—	—	—
1908	L.W. McAllister		12	4	0	.750	—	—	—	—	—	—	—	—	—	—
1909	L.W. McAllister		18	3	1	.841	—	—	—	—	—	—	—	—	—	—
1910	Branch Rickey		17	8	0	.680	—	—	—	—	—	—	—	—	—	—
1911	Branch Rickey		16	10	1	.611	—	—	—	—	—	—	—	—	—	—
1912	Branch Rickey		14	10	2	.577	—	—	—	—	—	—	—	—	—	—
1913	Branch Rickey		21	4	1	.827	—	—	—	—	—	—	—	—	—	—
1914	Carl Lundgren		22	6	0	.786	—	—	—	—	—	—	—	—	—	—
1915	Carl Lundgren		16	17	3	.486	—	—	—	—	—	—	—	—	—	—
1916	Carl Lundgren		9	12	2	.435	—	—	—	—	—	—	—	—	—	—
1917	Carl Lundgren		No team fielded due to World War I													
1918	Carl Lundgren	Big Ten	16	1	0	.941	9	1	0	.900	1st	—	—	—	—	—
1919	Carl Lundgren	Big Ten	13	1	0	.929	9	0	0	1.000	1st	—	—	—	—	—
1920	Carl Lundgren	Big Ten	17	6	1	.729	9	1	0	.900	1st	—	—	—	—	—
1921	Ray Fisher	Big Ten	21	4	0	.840	10	2	0	.833	2nd	—	—	—	—	—
1922	Ray Fisher	Big Ten	21	6	0	.778	9	3	0	.750	3rd	—	—	—	—	—
1923	Ray Fisher	Big Ten	22	4	0	.846	10	0	0	1.000	1st	—	—	—	—	—
1924	Ray Fisher	Big Ten	13	3	0	.813	8	2	0	.800	T-1st	—	—	—	—	—
1925	Ray Fisher	Big Ten	17	8	0	.680	7	4	0	.636	4th	—	—	—	—	—
1926	Ray Fisher	Big Ten	16	7	0	.696	9	2	0	.818	1st	—	—	—	—	—
1927	Ray Fisher	Big Ten	16	8	0	.667	8	4	0	.667	3rd	—	—	—	—	—
1928	Ray Fisher	Big Ten	22	5	0	.815	11	1	0	.917	1st	—	—	—	—	—
1929	Ray Fisher	Big Ten	15	6	0	.714	7	2	0	.778	1st	—	—	—	—	—
1930	Ray Fisher	Big Ten	9	15	1	.380	3	6	0	.333	7th	—	—	—	—	—
1931	Ray Fisher	Big Ten	11	7	0	.611	5	4	0	.556	T-5th	—	—	—	—	—
1932	Ray Fisher	Big Ten	19	15	1	.557	4	5	0	.444	7th	—	—	—	—	—
1933	Ray Fisher	Big Ten	12	4	0	.750	8	2	0	.800	T-2nd	—	—	—	—	—
1934	Ray Fisher	Big Ten	15	9	0	.625	6	6	0	.500	T-3rd	—	—	—	—	—
1935	Ray Fisher	Big Ten	11	11	0	.500	6	5	0	.545	5th	—	—	—	—	—
1936	Ray Fisher	Big Ten	20	5	0	.800	9	1	0	.900	1st	—	—	—	—	—
1937	Ray Fisher	Big Ten	16	8	0	.667	5	6	0	.455	6th	—	—	—	—	—
1938	Ray Fisher	Big Ten	14	12	0	.538	4	6	0	.400	8th	—	—	—	—	—
1939	Ray Fisher	Big Ten	18	9	2	.655	8	4	0	.667	3rd	—	—	—	—	—
1940	Ray Fisher	Big Ten	10	12	0	.455	7	5	0	.583	5th	—	—	—	—	—
1941	Ray Fisher	Big Ten	24	8	0	.750	10	2	0	.833	1st	—	—	—	—	—
1942	Ray Fisher	Big Ten	17	9	0	.654	10	2	0	.833	T-1st	—	—	—	—	—
1943	Ray Fisher	Big Ten	8	4	0	.667	3	2	0	.600	6th	—	—	—	—	—
1944	Ray Fisher	Big Ten	15	4	1	.775	8	0	0	1.000	1st	—	—	—	—	—
1945	Ray Fisher	Big Ten	20	1	0	.952	8	0	0	1.000	1st	—	—	—	—	—
1946	Ray Fisher	Big Ten	18	3	0	.857	6	2	0	.750	2nd	—	—	—	—	—
1947	Ray Fisher	Big Ten	18	10	0	.643	7	4	0	.636	3rd	—	—	—	—	—
1948	Ray Fisher	Big Ten	21	6	0	.778	10	2	0	.833	1st	—	—	—	—	—
1949	Ray Fisher	Big Ten	18	9	2	.655	8	4	0	.667	T-1st	—	—	—	—	—
1950	Ray Fisher	Big Ten	18	9	0	.667	9	3	0	.750	T-1st	—	—	—	—	—
1951	Ray Fisher	Big Ten	13	10	0	.565	4	8	0	.333	T-8th	—	—	—	—	—
1952	Ray Fisher	Big Ten	16	7	0	.696	8	4	0	.667	T-1st	—	—	—	—	—
1953	Ray Fisher	Big Ten	21	9	0	.700	10	3	0	.769	1st	—	National champions	—	—	—
1954	Ray Fisher	Big Ten	22	9	0	.710	10	5	0	.667	T-3rd	—	—	—	—	—
1955	Ray Fisher	Big Ten	17	11	1	.603	8	7	0	.533	5th	—	—	—	—	—
1956	Ray Fisher	Big Ten	17	9	0	.654	6	5	0	.545	4th	—	—	—	—	—
1957	Ray Fisher	Big Ten	17	7	0	.708	7	4	0	.636	T-2nd	—	—	—	—	—
1958	Ray Fisher	Big Ten	18	12	0	.600	7	8	0	.467	T-6th	—	—	—	—	—
1959	Don Lund	Big Ten	10	17	2	.379	5	7	0	.417	7th	—	—	—	—	—
1960	Don Lund	Big Ten	19	12	1	.609	7	7	0	.500	5th	—	—	—	—	—
1961	Don Lund	Big Ten	20	11	0	.645	10	2	0	.833	1st	—	District 4 Regional	—	12	—
1962	Don Lund	Big Ten	31	13	0	.705	12	3	0	.800	2nd	—	National champions	—	1	—
1963	Moby Benedict	Big Ten	21	11	0	.656	7	7	0	.500	5th	—	—	—	—	—
1964	Moby Benedict	Big Ten	19	16	0	.543	10	4	0	.714	2nd	—	—	—	—	—
1965	Moby Benedict	Big Ten	18	14	0	.563	10	5	0	.667	2nd	—	—	—	15	—
1966	Moby Benedict	Big Ten	22	11	0	.667	10	3	0	.769	3rd	—	—	—	21	—
1967	Moby Benedict	Big Ten	24	12	0	.667	10	4	0	.714	2nd	—	—	—	16	—
1968	Moby Benedict	Big Ten	17	16	0	.515	9	5	0	.643	4th	—	—	—	—	—
1969	Moby Benedict	Big Ten	14	21	1	.403	8	6	0	.571	3rd	—	—	—	—	—
1970	Moby Benedict	Big Ten	16	18	0	.471	7	7	0	.500	5th	—	—	—	—	—
1971	Moby Benedict	Big Ten	23	13	1	.635	10	5	0	.667	2nd	—	—	—	—	—
1972	Moby Benedict	Big Ten	18	13	1	.578	9	5	0	.643	T-3rd	—	—	—	—	—
1973	Moby Benedict	Big Ten	22	16	0	.579	12	6	0	.667	2nd	—	—	—	—	—
1974	Moby Benedict	Big Ten	18	14	1	.561	7	5	0	.583	3rd	—	—	—	—	—
1975	Moby Benedict	Big Ten	28	12	0	.700	13	3	0	.813	1st	—	Mideast Regional	—	17	—
1976	Moby Benedict	Big Ten	22	19	1	.536	9	4	0	.692	1st	—	Mideast Regional	—	20	—
1977	Moby Benedict	Big Ten	33	15	0	.688	14	4	0	.778	2nd	—	Midwest Regional	—	19	—
1978	Moby Benedict	Big Ten	30	17	0	.638	13	3	0	.813	1st	—	College World Series	—	6	—
1979	Moby Benedict	Big Ten	22	14	0	.611	10	4	0	.714	3rd	—	—	—	—	—
1980	Bud Middaugh	Big Ten	36	18	1	.664	14	2	0	.875	1st	—	College World Series	—	6	—
1981	Bud Middaugh	Big Ten	41	20	0	.672	10	4	0	.714	1st (East)	1st	College World Series	12	8	—
1982	Bud Middaugh	Big Ten	44	10	0	.815	13	3	0	.813	T-1st (East)	Semifinals	—	17	—	—
1983	Bud Middaugh	Big Ten	50	9	0	.847	13	2	0	.867	1st (East)	1st	College World Series	3	4	—
1984	Bud Middaugh	Big Ten	43	20	0	.683	11	5	0	.688	1st (East)	1st	College World Series	20	7	—
1985	Bud Middaugh	Big Ten	55	10	0	.846	14	2	0	.875	1st (East)	Semifinals	South I Regional	9	10	—
1986	Bud Middaugh	Big Ten	47	12	0	.797	13	3	0	.813	1st (East)	1st	Mideast Regional	16	28	—
1987	Bud Middaugh	Big Ten	52	12	0	.813	13	3	0	.813	1st (East)	1st	Northeast Regional	19	23	—
1988	Bud Middaugh	Big Ten	48	19	0	.716	20	8	0	.714	1st	Semifinals	Central Regional	24	19	—
1989	Bud Middaugh	Big Ten	49	16	0	.754	21	6	0	.778	1st	Finals	West II Regional	19	12	—
1990	Bill Freehan	Big Ten	33	24	0	.579	14	14	0	.500	5th	—	—	—	—	—
1991	Bill Freehan	Big Ten	34	23	1	.595	15	13	0	.536	5th	—	—	—	—	—
1992	Bill Freehan	Big Ten	21	32	0	.396	11	17	0	.393	9th	—	—	—	—	—
1993	Bill Freehan	Big Ten	25	30	0	.455	13	14	0	.481	7th	—	—	—	—	—
1994	Bill Freehan	Big Ten	29	29	0	.500	13	15	0	.464	T-3rd	Finals	—	—	—	—
1995	Bill Freehan	Big Ten	24	29	0	.453	10	16	0	.385	10th	—	—	—	—	—
1996	Geoff Zahn	Big Ten	24	30	0	.444	17	11	0	.607	4th	First Round	—	—	—	—
1997	Geoff Zahn	Big Ten	36	22	0	.621	17	9	0	.654	1st	—	—	—	—	—
1998	Geoff Zahn	Big Ten	21	27	1	.439	9	15	0	.375	6th	—	—	—	—	—
1999	Geoff Zahn	Big Ten	34	30	0	.531	15	13	0	.536	4th	1st	South Bend Regional	—	—	—
2000	Geoff Zahn	Big Ten	20	32	1	.387	10	18	0	.357	8th	—	—	—	—	—
2001	Geoff Zahn	Big Ten	28	28	0	.500	10	14	0	.417	6th	Finals	—	—	—	—
2002	Chris Harrison	Big Ten	21	32	0	.396	14	17	0	.452	8th	—	—	—	—	—
2003	Rich Maloney	Big Ten	30	27	0	.526	16	14	0	.533	3rd	Third Round	—	—	—	—
2004	Rich Maloney	Big Ten	34	26	0	.567	19	13	0	.594	T-3rd	Semifinals	—	—	—	—
2005	Rich Maloney	Big Ten	42	19	0	.689	17	12	0	.586	T-4th	Second Round	Atlanta Regional	—	—	—
2006	Rich Maloney	Big Ten	43	21	0	.672	23	9	0	.719	1st	1st	Atlanta Regional	—	—	—
2007	Rich Maloney	Big Ten	42	19	0	.689	21	7	0	.750	1st	Second Round	Corvallis Super Regional	—	—	—
2008	Rich Maloney	Big Ten	46	14	0	.767	26	5	0	.839	1st	1st	Ann Arbor Regional	22	20	22
2009	Rich Maloney	Big Ten	30	25	0	.545	9	15	0	.375	7th	—	—	—	—	—
2010	Rich Maloney	Big Ten	35	22	0	.614	14	10	0	.583	2nd	Semifinals	—	—	—	—
2011	Rich Maloney	Big Ten	17	37	0	.315	7	16	0	.304	10th	—	—	—	—	—
2012	Rich Maloney	Big Ten	22	34	0	.393	8	16	0	.333	10th	—	—	—	—	—
2013	Erik Bakich	Big Ten	29	27	0	.518	14	10	0	.583	T-5th	First Round	—	—	—	—
2014	Erik Bakich	Big Ten	30	29	1	.508	13	11	0	.542	T-4th	Semifinals	—	—	—	—
2015	Erik Bakich	Big Ten	39	25	0	.609	14	10	0	.583	T-3rd	1st	Louisville Regional	—	—	—
2016	Erik Bakich	Big Ten	36	21	0	.632	13	10	0	.565	5th	Second Round	—	—	—	—
2017	Erik Bakich	Big Ten	42	17	0	.712	16	8	0	.667	2nd	First Round	Chapel Hill Regional	—	—	—
2018	Erik Bakich	Big Ten	32	21	0	.604	15	8	0	.652	3rd	Second Round	—	—	—	—
2019	Erik Bakich	Big Ten	50	22	0	.694	16	7	0	.696	2nd	Semifinals	College World Series Runner-up	2	2	2
2020	Erik Bakich	Big Ten	8	7	0	.533	0	0	0	–	7th	Cancelled	Cancelled (Note: All remaining winter and spring championships cancelled due to the COVID-19 pandemic.)	—	—	—
2021	Erik Bakich	Big Ten	27	19	0	.587	27	17	0	.614	3rd	—	South Bend Regional	—	—	—
2022	Erik Bakich	Big Ten	34	28	0	.548	12	12	0	.500	5th	1st	Louisville Regional	—	—	—
2023	Tracy Smith	Big Ten	28	28	0	.500	13	11	0	.542	6th	Semifinals	—	—	—	—
2024	Tracy Smith	Big Ten	32	28	0	.533	14	10	0	.583	T-4th	Semifinals	—	—	—	—
2025	Tracy Smith	Big Ten	33	23	0	.589	16	14	0	.533	T-6th	Pool Play	—	—	—	—
2026	Tracy Smith	Big Ten	34	24	0	.586	17	13	0	.567	7th	Quarterfinals	—	—	—	—
