= Doug Schreiber =

Baseball player and coach

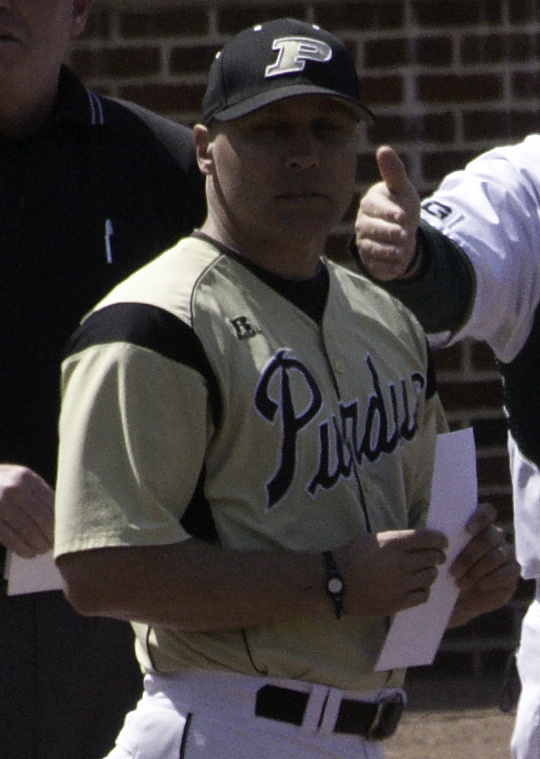
- Schreiber with Purdue in 2014

Biographical details
- Born: August 25, 1963 (age 63); La Porte, Indiana, U.S.
- Education: Purdue University

Playing career
- 1983–1986: Purdue
- Position: Second baseman

Coaching career (HC unless noted)
- 1991–1992: Ball State (GA)
- 1993: Butler (asst.)
- 1994: Notre Dame (asst.)
- 1995–1998: Arizona State (asst.)
- 1999–2016: Purdue
- 2018–2019: McCutcheon H. S.
- 2020–2025: Purdue Fort Wayne

Head coaching record
- Overall: 562–692 (.448)
- Tournaments: NCAA: 1–2; Big Ten: 14–18; Horizon: 0–4

Accomplishments and honors

Championships
- Big Ten (2012); Big Ten tournament (2012)

Awards
- Big Ten Coach of the Year (2012)

Doug Schreiber (born August 25, 1963) is an American baseball coach and former second baseman. He is the former head baseball coach of the Purdue Fort Wayne Mastodons. Schreiber played college baseball at Purdue University. He was the head baseball coach at Purdue University from 1999 to 2016, where he posted a 485–489 record. From 2004 to 2006, Purdue qualified for three consecutive Big Ten baseball tournaments. His 2006 team went 31–27, and defeated #2 North Carolina. In 2001, Purdue finished second in the Big Ten Conference, for its best finish in over 30 years. The 2001 team upset #1 ranked Rice to start the season.

Schreiber ranks second in school history in all-time wins, and first in conference wins with 132. From 1995 to 1998, he served as the top assistant coach at Arizona State University. In 1994, he was an assistant coach for the University of Notre Dame.

== Playing career ==
Schreiber was a four-year starter at Purdue from 1983 to 1986. He was a second baseman, who appears in the school record books for multiple categories. He ranks first in school history in walks (132), fourth in runs scored (159), third in games played (220), and sixth in triples (9).

== Coaching career ==
Following the 2016 season, Schreiber resigned as the head baseball coach at Purdue.

On July 23, 2019, Schreiber was named the head coach at Purdue University Fort Wayne.

== Head coaching records ==
Below is a table of Schreiber's yearly records as an NCAA head baseball coach.

Record table
| Season | Team | Overall | Conference | Standing | Postseason |
|---|---|---|---|---|---|
Purdue Boilermakers (Big Ten Conference) (1999–2016)
| 1999 | Purdue | 24–30 | 10–17 | T-7th | |
| 2000 | Purdue | 35–23 | 17–11 | T-3rd | Big Ten tournament |
| 2001 | Purdue | 32–24 | 19–7 | 2nd | Big Ten tournament |
| 2002 | Purdue | 24–32 | 13–19 | 9th | |
| 2003 | Purdue | 29–26 | 13–18 | 7th | |
| 2004 | Purdue | 29–28 | 17–14 | 5th | Big Ten tournament |
| 2005 | Purdue | 27–30 | 17–11 | 2nd | Big Ten tournament |
| 2006 | Purdue | 31–27 | 15–17 | T-5th | Big Ten tournament |
| 2007 | Purdue | 22–32 | 11–20 | 8th | |
| 2008 | Purdue | 32–26 | 21–10 | 2nd | Big Ten tournament |
| 2009 | Purdue | 25–26 | 11–12 | 6th | Big Ten tournament |
| 2010 | Purdue | 33–24 | 12–12 | T-5th | Big Ten tournament |
| 2011 | Purdue | 37–20 | 14–10 | 3rd | Big Ten tournament |
| 2012 | Purdue | 45–14 | 17–7 | 1st | NCAA Regional |
| 2013 | Purdue | 17–34 | 6–18 | 10th | |
| 2014 | Purdue | 13–37 | 6–18 | 10th | |
| 2015 | Purdue | 20–34 | 6–17 | 13th | |
| 2016 | Purdue | 10–44 | 2–22 | 13th | |
| Purdue: | | 485–489 (.498) | 227–250 (.476) | | |
Purdue Fort Wayne Mastodons (Summit League) (2020)
| 2020 | Purdue Fort Wayne | 5–10 | 0–0 | | Season canceled due to COVID-19 |
Purdue Fort Wayne Mastodons (Horizon League) (2021–2025)
| 2021 | Purdue Fort Wayne | 11–35 | 8–28 | 7th | |
| 2022 | Purdue Fort Wayne | 18–36 | 13–15 | 4th | Horizon League tournament |
| 2023 | Purdue Fort Wayne | 13–43 | 8–22 | 6th | Horizon League tournament |
| 2024 | Purdue Fort Wayne | 19–37 | 11–19 | 5th | Horizon League Tournament |
| 2025 | Purdue Fort Wayne | 11–42 | 9–20 | 6th | Horizon League Tournament |
| Purdue Fort Wayne: | | 77–203 (.275) | 49–104 (.320) | | |
| Total: | | 562–692 (.448) | | | |
National champion Postseason invitational champion Conference regular season champion Conference regular season and conference tournament champion Division regular season champion Division regular season and conference tournament champion Conference tournament champion
