= Dan Hartleb =

American baseball coach

Current position
- Title: Head coach
- Team: Illinois
- Conference: Big Ten
- Record: 625–470–1 (.571)

Biographical details
- Born: February 15, 1966 (age 60); Hamilton, Ohio, U.S.

Playing career
- 1985–1986: John A. Logan College
- 1987–1988: Southern Illinois
- Position: Catcher

Coaching career (HC unless noted)
- 1989–1990: Southern Illinois (assistant)
- 1991–2005: Illinois (assistant)
- 2006–present: Illinois

Head coaching record
- Overall: 625–470–1 (.571)
- Tournaments: 7–10 (NCAA Division I); 14–27 (Big Ten)

Accomplishments and honors

Championships
- 3 Big Ten regular season (2011, 2015, 2024); Big Ten tournament (2011)

Awards
- 2× Big Ten Coach of the Year (2015, 2024)

Dan Hartleb (born February 15, 1966) is an American baseball coach and former catcher, who is the head baseball coach of the Illinois Fighting Illini. Hartleb played two seasons of junior college baseball at John A. Logan College before finishing his playing career with two seasons at Southern Illinois. His coaching career began immediately after his playing career ended, as he served as a graduate assistant under Itch Jones at Southern Illinois from 1989 to 1990. When Jones was offered the head coaching position at Illinois following the 1990 season, Hartleb went with him and served as an Illinois assistant from 1991 to 2005. Under Hartleb, the Fighting Illini have appeared in four NCAA tournaments.

Hartleb became the head coach at Illinois when Jones retired at the end of the 2005 season. The Illini qualified for four Big Ten Tournaments in Hartleb's first five seasons, finishing with an above-.500 record in each. They failed to make an NCAA tournament or win more than one game in a Big Ten Tournament, however, and media outlets raised the possibility that Hartleb's contract would not be renewed following the 2010. It was, however, and Illinois won the Big Ten regular season and tournament titles the following year, qualifying for the NCAA tournament. There, the team went 2–2 and reached a regional final. After missing the Big Ten Tournament in 2012, Illinois reached another NCAA tournament in 2013. Following the season, Hartleb signed a new, multi-year contract.

== Head coaching record ==
The following is a table of Hartleb's yearly records as a collegiate head baseball coach.

Record table
Season	Team	Overall	Conference	Standing	Postseason
Illinois Fighting Illini (Big Ten Conference) (2006–present)
2006	Illinois	29–29	15–17	T-5th	Big Ten tournament
2007	Illinois	31–27	16–14	5th	Big Ten tournament
2008	Illinois	31–25	16–15	4th	Big Ten tournament
2009	Illinois	34–20	16–8	4th	Big Ten tournament
2010	Illinois	26–26	10–14	9th	
2011	Illinois	30–27	15–9	T-1st	NCAA Regional
2012	Illinois	28–25	11–13	T-6th	
2013	Illinois	35–20	14–10	T-5th	NCAA Regional
2014	Illinois	32–21	17–7	3rd	Big Ten tournament
2015	Illinois	50–10–1	21–1	1st	NCAA Super Regional
2016	Illinois	28–23	12–12	9th	
2017	Illinois	23–28	9–15	10th	
2018	Illinois	33–20	15–9	4th	Big Ten tournament
2019	Illinois	36–21	15–9	T-3rd	NCAA Regional
2020	Illinois	8–5	0–0		Season canceled due to COVID-19
2021	Illinois	22–22	22–22	7th	
2022	Illinois	31–22	17–7	T-2nd	Big Ten tournament
2023	Illinois	25–27	12–12	7th	Big Ten tournament
2024	Illinois	35–21	18–6	1st	NCAA Regional
2025	Illinois	30–24	14–16	11th	
2026	Illinois	28–27	14–16	9th	Big Ten tournament
Illinois:		625–470–1 (.571)	299–230 (.565)		
Total:		625–470–1 (.571)			
National champion Postseason invitational champion Conference regular season champion Conference regular season and conference tournament champion Division regular season champion Division regular season and conference tournament champion Conference tournament champion

== Personal ==
Due to the death of his father, Hartleb spent some time away from the team during the 2014 season.

== See also ==
- List of current NCAA Division I baseball coaches
- Illinois Fighting Illini
