= Joe Hindelang =

American college baseball coach (1945–2024)

Biographical details
- Born: November 7, 1945; Philadelphia, Pennsylvania, U.S.
- Died: February 16, 2024 (aged 78)

Playing career
- 1965–1967: Temple
- 1967: Oneonta Yankees
- 1967: FIL Yankees
- Position: Pitcher

Coaching career (HC unless noted)
- 1978–1982: USciences
- 1983–1990: Lafayette
- 1991–2004: Penn State

Head coaching record
- Overall: 610–555–4
- Tournaments: East Coast: 7–10; Big Ten: 8–12; NCAA: 4–5

Accomplishments and honors

Championships
- East Coast Conference (1990); East Coast Tournament (1990); Big Ten Conference (1996)

Awards
- Big Ten Coach of the Year (1996)

Joseph J. Hindelang (November 7, 1945 – February 16, 2024) was an American college baseball coach and pitcher. Hindelang also played and coached basketball. He played college baseball and basketball at Temple University from 1965 to 1967 for baseball head coach Skip Wilson and basketball head coach Harry Litwack. He then played professional baseball in 1967. He was the head baseball coach and assistant basketball coach at the University of the Sciences from 1978 to 1982, the same positions at Lafayette College from 1983 to 1990 and head baseball coach at Pennsylvania State University from 1991 to 2004. Hindelang also coached varsity baseball and basketball at Chestnut Hill Academy and the William Penn Charter School in Philadelphia. He died on February 16, 2024, at the age of 78.

== Playing career ==
Upon graduation from Abraham Lincoln High School, Hindelang enrolled at Temple University to play basketball and baseball for the Owls.

== Coaching career ==
Hindelang landed his first coaching job in baseball as the head coach at the Philadelphia College of Pharmacy and Sciences in 1978. He was the head coach for 5 years, leading the Devils to a record of 63–48–1. On September 6, 1990, Hindelang was named the head baseball coach at Penn State. On July 16, 2004, Hindelang announced his retirement from coaching.

== Head coaching record ==
Record table
| Season | Team | Overall | Conference | Standing | Postseason |
|---|---|---|---|---|---|
USciences Devils () (1978–1982)
| 1980 | USciences | 17–8 | | | |
| USciences: | | 63–48–1 | | | |
Lafayette Leopards (East Coast Conference) (1983–1990)
| 1983 | Lafayette | 11–24 | | | |
| 1984 | Lafayette | 13–24 | | | East Coast Tournament |
| 1985 | Lafayette | 17–23–1 | | | East Coast Tournament |
| 1986 | Lafayette | 27–13 | | | East Coast Tournament |
| 1987 | Lafayette | 29–15 | | | East Coast Tournament |
| 1988 | Lafayette | 14–21 | | | |
| 1989 | Lafayette | 21–15 | | | East Coast Tournament |
| 1990 | Lafayette | 26–17 | | 1st | South II Regional |
| Lafayette: | | 158–152–1 | | | |
Penn State Nittany Lions (Independent) (1991)
| 1991 | Penn State | 25–20 | | | |
Penn State Nittany Lions (Big Ten Conference) (1992–2004)
| 1992 | Penn State | 24–24 | 11–17 | T-8th | |
| 1993 | Penn State | 15–28 | 3–25 | 10th | |
| 1994 | Penn State | 25–24 | 12–15 | 6th | |
| 1995 | Penn State | 25–29–1 | 13–13 | 5th | |
| 1996 | Penn State | 32–24–1 | 19–8 | 1st | Big Ten tournament |
| 1997 | Penn State | 29–24 | 12–14 | 6th | |
| 1998 | Penn State | 28–24 | 15–11 | 4th | Big Ten tournament |
| 1999 | Penn State | 32–23 | 12–15 | 6th | |
| 2000 | Penn State | 45–19 | 18–9 | 2nd | NCAA Super Regional |
| 2001 | Penn State | 29–29 | 15–11 | 4th | Big Ten tournament |
| 2002 | Penn State | 23–30 | 11–19 | 10th | |
| 2003 | Penn State | 29–28 | 17–15 | 4th | Big Ten tournament |
| 2004 | Penn State | 28–29 | 17–15 | 6th | Big Ten tournament |
| Penn State: | | 389–355–2 | 175–187 | | |
| Total: | | 610–555–4 | | | |
National champion Postseason invitational champion Conference regular season champion Conference regular season and conference tournament champion Division regular season champion Division regular season and conference tournament champion Conference tournament champion
