= Robbie Wine =

American baseball player and coach (born 1962)

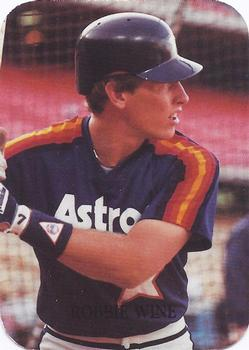
- Catcher
- Born: July 13, 1962 (age 64); Norristown, Pennsylvania, U.S.
- Batted: Right Threw: Right

MLB debut
- September 2, 1986, for the Houston Astros

Last MLB appearance
- October 3, 1987, for the Houston Astros

MLB statistics
- Batting average: .146
- Home runs: 0
- Runs batted in: 0
- Stats at Baseball Reference

Teams
- Houston Astros (1986–1987)

Robbie Wine
Biographical details
- Education: Oklahoma State University

Playing career
- 1981–1983: Oklahoma State Cowboys
- 1983: Auburn Astros
- 1984: Daytona Beach Astros
- 1985: Columbus Astros
- 1986–1987: Tucson Toros
- 1986–1987: Houston Astros
- 1988: Greenville Braves
- 1988: Oklahoma City 89ers
- 1988: Columbus Clippers
- 1988–1989: Richmond Braves
- 1989: Indianapolis Indians
- 1990: Canton–Akron Indians
- Position: Catcher

Coaching career (HC unless noted)
- 1991: Miami Miracle (asst.)
- 1992–1993: Milwaukee Brewers (MLB asst.)
- 1994–1996: Milwaukee Brewers (MiLB asst.)
- 1997–2004: Oklahoma State Cowboys (asst.)
- 2005–2013: Penn State Nittany Lions
- 2014–2015: San Diego Padres (MiLB)

Head coaching record
- Overall: 228–262

Robert Paul Wine, Jr. (born July 13, 1962) is an American former professional baseball player and coach. A catcher, Wine played parts of two seasons in Major League Baseball for the Houston Astros in 1986 and 1987. He last played professional baseball in 1990. He was the head baseball coach of the Penn State Nittany Lions from 2005 to 2013. He then managed in the San Diego Padres organization for two seasons.

== Early years ==
Wine graduated from Methacton High School in Norristown, PA in 1980, where he played shortstop.

== Playing career ==
Wine was an All-American catcher for the Oklahoma State Cowboys, where he played from 1981 to 1983. In 1982, he played collegiate summer baseball with the Wareham Gatemen of the Cape Cod Baseball League and was named a league all-star. He was drafted in the first round (8th overall) of the 1983 Major League Baseball draft by the Astros.

After three seasons of minor league baseball, Wine made his major league debut on September 2, 1986 as a September call-up. He played nine games, getting 3 hits in 12 at bats.

In 1987, Wine was called up again in July after both Mark Bailey and Ronn Reynolds had been tried as the backup catcher to Alan Ashby. Wine played in 13 games in July and August, but batted just .103. He appeared in one final major league game on October 3. He was traded from the Astros to the Texas Rangers for Mike Loynd during spring training on March 25, 1988. He played in five different organizations from 1988 to 1990 without returning to the majors.

== Coaching career ==
After his playing career ended following the 1990 season, Wine served as an assistant coach in professional baseball from 1991 to 1996. In 1995, while coaching for the Milwaukee Brewers, he also was a spring training replacement player during the ongoing strike. Prior to the 1997 season, he accepted an assistant coaching position at his alma mater Oklahoma State. Prior to the 2005 season, he was hired as the head baseball coach at Penn State. Following the 2013 season, he resigned the position. His career record was 228–262.

Wine managed the Class-A Short Season Eugene Emeralds in 2014 and the Tri-City Dust Devils in 2015. Both teams were San Diego Padres affiliates in the Northwest League.

=== Head coaching record ===
Below is a table of Wine's yearly records as an NCAA head baseball coach.

Record table
Season	Team	Overall	Conference	Standing	Postseason
Penn State Nittany Lions (Big Ten Conference) (2005–2013)
2005	Penn State	28–27	13–19	8th	
2006	Penn State	20–36	13–19	T-7th	
2007	Penn State	31–26	20–10	3rd	Big Ten Tournament
2008	Penn State	27–31	17–15	3rd	Big Ten Tournament
2009	Penn State	25–26	8–16	8th	
2010	Penn State	22–30	9–15	10th	
2011	Penn State	32–22	12–12	6th	Big Ten Tournament
2012	Penn State	29–27	15–9	3rd	Big Ten Tournament
2013	Penn State	14–36	4–20	11th	
Total:		228–262			
National champion Postseason invitational champion Conference regular season champion Conference regular season and conference tournament champion Division regular season champion Division regular season and conference tournament champion Conference tournament champion

== Personal ==
Wine is the son of Philadelphia Phillies and Montreal Expos infielder Bobby Wine.

Win was inducted into the Montgomery County chapter of the Pennsylvania Sports Hall of Fame in 2013.

== See also ==
- List of current NCAA Division I baseball coaches
- List of second-generation Major League Baseball players
