= 1999 Big Ten baseball tournament =

1999 Big Ten Conference baseball tournament
- Teams: 4
- Format: Double-elimination
- Finals site: Bill Davis Stadium; Columbus, OH
- Champions: Michigan (6th title)
- Winning coach: Geoff Zahn (1st title)
- MVP: Bobby Scales (Michigan)

1999 Big Ten Conference baseball standings
	Conf.				Overall
Team	W		L	PCT	W		L	PCT
No. 11 Ohio State ‍†‍‍^{y}	25	–	3	.893	50	–	14	.781
Minnesota ‍‍‍^{y}	21	–	7	.750	46	–	18	.719
Illinois ‍‍‍	15	–	12	.556	24	–	22	.522
Michigan ‍‍‡‍^{y}	15	–	13	.536	34	–	30	.531
Indiana ‍‍‍	14	–	14	.500	37	–	17	.685
Penn State ‍‍‍	12	–	15	.444	32	–	23	.582
Michigan State ‍‍‍	10	–	17	.370	28	–	25	.528
Purdue ‍‍‍	10	–	17	.370	24	–	30	.444
Northwestern ‍‍‍	10	–	18	.357	24	–	29	.453
Iowa ‍‍‍	6	–	22	.214	22	–	34	.393
x – Division champion ‡ – Tournament champion y – Invited to the NCAA tournament As of June 30, 1999; Rankings from Collegiate Baseball

The 1999 Big Ten Conference baseball tournament was held at Bill Davis Stadium on the campus of Ohio State University in Columbus, Ohio, from May 15 through 19. The top four teams from the regular season participated in the double-elimination tournament, the eighteenth annual tournament sponsored by the Big Ten Conference to determine the league champion. Michigan won their sixth tournament championship and earned the Big Ten Conference's automatic bid to the 1999 NCAA Division I baseball tournament.

== Format and seeding ==
The 1999 tournament was a 4-team double-elimination tournament, with seeds determined by conference regular season winning percentage only.

Team	W	L	PCT	GB	Seed
Ohio State	25	3	.893	–	1
Minnesota	21	7	.750	4	2
Illinois	15	12	.556	9.5	3
Michigan	15	13	.536	10	4
Indiana	14	14	.500	11	–
Penn State	12	15	.444	12.5	–
Michigan State	10	17	.370	13.5	–
Purdue	10	17	.370	13.5	–
Northwestern	10	18	.357	14	–
Iowa	6	22	.214	19	–

== Tournament ==
Upper round 1
1	Ohio State	6
4	Michigan	8
2	Minnesota	9
3	Illinois	12
Lower round 1
1	Ohio State	1
2	Minnesota	10

Upper final
4	Michigan	7
3	Illinois	6
Lower final
3	Illinois	3
2	Minnesota	9

Final
4	Michigan	10	12
2	Minnesota	13	11

== All-Tournament Team ==
The following players were named to the All-Tournament Team.

Pos	Name	School
P	J. J. Putz	Michigan
P	Chad Clarey	Minnesota
P	Kelly Werner	Minnesota
C	Josh Holthaus	Minnesota
1B	Robb Quinlan	Minnesota
2B	Bobby Scales	Michigan
SS	Jon Anderson	Illinois
3B	Mike Cervenak	Michigan
OF	Jason Alcaraz	Michigan
OF	Brian Bush	Michigan
OF	Jason Kennedy	Minnesota
DH	Aron Amundson	Minnesota

=== Most Outstanding Player ===
Bobby Scales was named Most Outstanding Player. Scales was a second baseman for Michigan.
