= 1998 Big Ten baseball tournament =

1998 Big Ten Conference baseball tournament
- Teams: 4
- Format: Double-elimination
- Finals site: Illinois Field; Champaign, IL
- Champions: Minnesota (6th title)
- Winning coach: John Anderson (6th title)
- MVP: Mark Groebner (Minnesota)

1998 Big Ten Conference baseball standings
	Conf.				Overall
Team	W		L	PCT	W		L	PCT
Illinois ‍†‍‍^{y}	19	–	5	.792	39	–	19	.672
Minnesota ‍‍‡‍^{y}	19	–	9	.679	43	–	13	.768
Ohio State ‍‍‍	18	–	9	.667	36	–	16	.692
Penn State ‍‍‍	15	–	11	.577	28	–	24	.538
Indiana ‍‍‍	14	–	14	.500	29	–	27	.518
Iowa ‍‍‍	9	–	15	.375	19	–	27	.413
Michigan ‍‍‍	9	–	15	.375	21	–	27	.438
Northwestern ‍‍‍	10	–	18	.357	27	–	26	.509
Purdue ‍‍‍	9	–	18	.333	23	–	29	.442
Michigan State ‍‍‍	8	–	16	.333	25	–	27	.481
x – Division champion ‡ – Tournament champion y – Invited to the NCAA tournament As of June 30, 1998; Rankings from Collegiate Baseball

The 1998 Big Ten Conference baseball tournament was held at Illinois Field on the campus of the University of Illinois at Urbana–Champaign in Champaign, Illinois, from May 15 through 19. The top four teams from the regular season participated in the double-elimination tournament, the eighteenth annual tournament sponsored by the Big Ten Conference to determine the league champion. Minnesota won their sixth tournament championship and earned the Big Ten Conference's automatic bid to the 1998 NCAA Division I baseball tournament.

== Format and seeding ==
The 1998 tournament was a 4-team double-elimination tournament, with seeds determined by conference regular season winning percentage only.

Team	W	L	PCT	GB	Seed
Illinois	19	5	.792	–	1
Minnesota	19	9	.679	2	2
Ohio State	18	9	.667	2.5	3
Penn State	15	11	.577	5	4
Indiana	14	14	.500	7	–
Michigan	9	15	.375	10	–
Iowa	9	15	.375	10	–
Northwestern	10	18	.357	11	–
Michigan State	8	16	.333	11	–
Purdue	9	18	.333	11.5	–

== Tournament ==
Upper round 1
1	Illinois	2
4	Penn State	5
2	Minnesota	10
3	Ohio State	3
Lower round 1
1	Illinois	9
3	Ohio State	8

Upper final
4	Penn State	5
2	Minnesota	14
Lower final
4	Penn State	5
1	Illinois	11

Final
2	Minnesota	9
1	Illinois	8

== All-Tournament Team ==
The following players were named to the All-Tournament Team.

Pos	Name	School
P	Ben Birk	Minnesota
P	Nate Bump	Penn State
C	Jeremy Megen	Minnesota
1B	Robb Quinlan	Minnesota
2B	D. J. Svihlik	Illinois
SS	Rick Brosseau	Minnesota
3B	Craig Marquie	Illinois
OF	Danny Rhodes	Illinois
OF	Dan O'Neill	Illinois
OF	Mark Groebner	Minnesota
DH	Adam Horton	Minnesota

=== Most Outstanding Player ===
Mark Groebner was named Most Outstanding Player. Groebner was an outfielder for Minnesota.
