= Big Ten baseball tournament =

College baseball conference championship

- Conference baseball championship
- Sport: Baseball
- Conference: Big Ten Conference
- Number of teams: 12
- Format: 4 Pools (3 Teams Each) 4-team Single Elimination For Pool Winners
- Current stadium: Charles Schwab Field
- Current location: Omaha, Nebraska
- Played: 1981–present
- Last contest: 2026
- Current champion: UCLA
- Most championships: Michigan Wolverines; Minnesota Golden Gophers; Ohio State Buckeyes (10)
- TV partner: BTN

Host stadiums
- Charles Schwab Field (2014, 2016, 2018–present); Bart Kaufman Field (2017); Target Field (2013, 2015); Huntington Park (2009, 2011–2012); Ray Fisher Stadium (1981, 1983, 1985, 1987–1989, 1997, 2006–2008); Illinois Field (1998, 2005); Siebert Field (1984, 1986, 2000, 2002–2004); Bill Davis Stadium (1999, 2001, 2010); Beaver Field (1996); Trautman Field (1991–92, 1995); C. O. Brown Stadium (1993–94); Duane Banks Field (1990); Old Illinois Field (1982)

Host locations
- Omaha, Nebraska, (2014, 2016, 2018–present); Bloomington, Indiana (2017); Minneapolis, Minnesota, (1984, 1986, 2000, 2002-04, 2013, 2015); Columbus, Ohio, (1991–1992, 1995, 1999, 2001, 2009–2012); Ann Arbor, Michigan, (1981, 1983, 1985, 1987–1989, 1997, 2006–2008); Champaign, Illinois, (1982, 1998, 2005); State College, Pennsylvania (1996); Battle Creek, Michigan, (1993–1994); Iowa City, Iowa (1990)

The Big Ten baseball tournament is the conference championship tournament in baseball for the NCAA Division I Big Ten Conference. The winner of the tournament receives the conference's automatic bid to the NCAA Division I baseball tournament.

== History ==
The Big Ten baseball tournament began in 1981. From 1981 to 1999, the tournament was a 4-team double-elimination tournament. In 2000, the tournament expanded to a 6-team double elimination format, then 8 teams in 2014.

From 1981 until 1987, the Big Ten Conference was split into two divisions, named the 'East' and the 'West'. The top two teams in each division at the end of the regular season participated in the tournament. In 1988, the conference eliminated the divisions, and the tournament's field was determined by the four (later six, then eight) teams with the best conference rankings.

== Champions ==
=== By year ===
Year	Champion	Site	Most Outstanding Player
1981	Michigan	Ray Fisher Stadium • Ann Arbor, MI	Gerry Hool, Michigan
1982	Minnesota	Old Illinois Field • Champaign, IL	Terry Steinbach, Minnesota / Jeff King, Ohio State
1983	Michigan	Ray Fisher Stadium • Ann Arbor, MI	Barry Larkin, Michigan
1984	Michigan	Siebert Field • Minneapolis, MN	Kurt Zimmerman, Michigan
1985	Minnesota	Ray Fisher Stadium • Ann Arbor, MI	Jon Beckman, Minnesota
1986	Michigan	Siebert Field • Minneapolis, MN	Tim McIntosh, Minnesota
1987	Michigan	Ray Fisher Stadium • Ann Arbor, MI	Greg Everson, Michigan
1988	Minnesota	Ray Fisher Stadium • Ann Arbor, MI	Vince Palyan Minnesota
1989	Illinois	Ray Fisher Stadium • Ann Arbor, MI	Rich Capparelli, Illinois
1990	Illinois	Duane Banks Field • Iowa City, IA	Bob Christensen, Illinois
1991	Ohio State	Trautman Field • Columbus, OH	Keith Klodnick, Ohio State
1992	Minnesota	Trautman Field • Columbus, OH	Scott Bakkum, Minnesota
1993	Minnesota	C. O. Brown Stadium • Battle Creek, MI	Matt Beaumont, Ohio State
1994	Ohio State	C. O. Brown Stadium • Battle Creek, MI	Mike Repasky, Ohio State
1995	Ohio State	Trautman Field • Columbus, OH	Shane Gunderson, Minnesota / Scott Kaczmar, Ohio State
1996	Indiana	Beaver Field • State College, PA	Dan Ferrell, Indiana
1997	Ohio State	Ray Fisher Stadium • Ann Arbor, MI	Mike Lockwood, Ohio State
1998	Minnesota	Illinois Field • Champaign, IL	Mark Groebner, Minnesota
1999	Michigan	Bill Davis Stadium • Columbus, OH	Bobby Scales, Michigan
2000	Illinois	Siebert Field • Minneapolis, MN	Jason Anderson, Illinois
2001	Minnesota	Bill Davis Stadium • Columbus, OH	Jack Hannahan, Minnesota
2002	Ohio State	Siebert Field • Minneapolis, MN	Joe Wilkins, Ohio State
2003	Ohio State	Siebert Field • Minneapolis, MN	Brett Garrard, Ohio State
2004	Minnesota	Siebert Field • Minneapolis, MN	Glen Perkins, Minnesota
2005	Ohio State	Illinois Field • Champaign, IL	Steve Caravati, Ohio State
2006	Michigan	Ray Fisher Stadium • Ann Arbor, MI	Adam Abraham, Michigan
2007	Ohio State	Ray Fisher Stadium • Ann Arbor, MI	Cory Luebke, Ohio State
2008	Michigan	Ray Fisher Stadium • Ann Arbor, MI	Michael Powers, Michigan
2009	Indiana	Huntington Park • Columbus, OH	Matt Bashore, Indiana
2010	Minnesota	Bill Davis Stadium • Columbus, OH	Kyle Knudson, Minnesota
2011	Illinois	Huntington Park • Columbus, OH	Adam Davis, Illinois
2012	Purdue	Huntington Park • Columbus, OH	Kevin Plawecki, Purdue
2013	Indiana	Target Field • Minneapolis, MN	Sam Travis Indiana
2014	Indiana	TD Ameritrade Park • Omaha, NE	Kyle Schwarber, Indiana
2015	Michigan	Target Field • Minneapolis, MN	Jake Cronenworth, Michigan
2016	Ohio State	TD Ameritrade Park • Omaha, NE	Ronnie Dawson, Ohio State
2017	Iowa	Bart Kaufman Field • Bloomington, IN	Chris Whelan, Iowa
2018	Minnesota	TD Ameritrade Park • Omaha, NE	Jordan Kozicky, Minnesota
2019	Ohio State	TD Ameritrade Park • Omaha, NE	Andrew Magno, Ohio State
2020	Cancelled due to the COVID-19 pandemic		
2021	Cancelled due to the COVID-19 pandemic		
2022	Michigan	Charles Schwab Field • Omaha, NE	Clark Elliott, Michigan
2023	Maryland	Charles Schwab Field • Omaha, NE	Nick Lorusso, Maryland
2024	Nebraska	Charles Schwab Field • Omaha, NE	Josh Caron, Nebraska
2025	Nebraska	Charles Schwab Field • Omaha, NE	Roch Cholowsky, UCLA
2026	UCLA	Charles Schwab Field • Omaha, NE	Mulivai Levu, UCLA

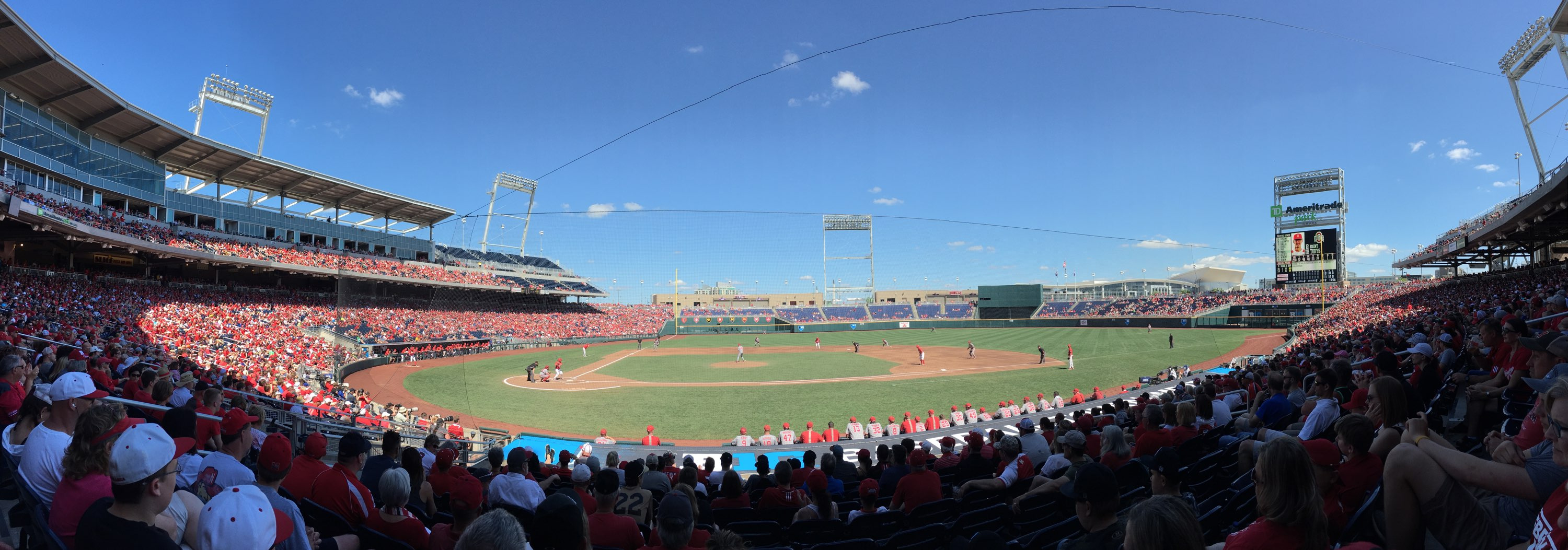
Over 17,000 spectators filled TD Ameritrade to witness the 2019 Big Ten Championship Game

=== By school ===
Updated as of 2026 season

School	Appearances	W-L	Pct	Tourney Titles	Title Years	Notes
Minnesota	31	69–45	.605	10	1982, 1985, 1988, 1992, 1993, 1998, 2001, 2004, 2010, 2018	
Michigan	30	59–45	.567	10	1981, 1983, 1984, 1986, 1987, 1999, 2006, 2008, 2015, 2022	
Ohio State	31	61–48	.560	10	1991, 1994, 1995, 1997, 2002, 2003, 2005, 2007, 2016, 2019	
Indiana	17	30–27	.526	4	1996, 2009, 2013, 2014	
Illinois	26	31–44	.413	4	1989, 1990, 2000, 2011	
Nebraska	8	15–12	.556	2	2024, 2025	Joined Big Ten in 2012
UCLA	2	6–1	.857	1	2026	Joined Big Ten in 2025
Maryland	6	14–9	.609	1	2023	Joined Big Ten in 2015
Purdue	19	23–35	.397	1	2012	
Iowa	16	19–30	.388	1	2017	
Oregon	2	3–2	.600	0		Joined Big Ten in 2025
USC	2	2–2	.500	0		Joined Big Ten in 2025
Penn State	12	16–23	.410	0		
Rutgers	4	4–6	.400	0		Joined Big Ten in 2015
Washington	2	2–3	.400	0		Joined Big Ten in 2025
Michigan State	17	18–33	.353	0		
Wisconsin	1	1–2	.333	0		Dropped baseball in 1991
Northwestern	8	7–16	.304	0		
