= 2005 Big Ten baseball tournament =

2005 Big Ten Conference baseball tournament
- Teams: 6
- Format: Double-elimination
- Finals site: Illinois Field; Champaign, IL
- Champions: Ohio State (7th title)
- Winning coach: Bob Todd (7th title)
- MVP: Steve Caravati (Ohio State)

2005 Big Ten Conference baseball standings
	Conf.				Overall
Team	W		L	PCT	W		L	PCT
Illinois ‍†‍‍	20	–	12	.625	33	–	23	.589
Purdue ‍‍‍	17	–	11	.607	27	–	30	.474
Iowa ‍‍‍	19	–	13	.594	28	–	29	.491
Michigan ‍‍‍^{y}	17	–	12	.586	42	–	19	.689
Ohio State ‍‍‡‍^{y}	17	–	12	.586	40	–	20	.667
Minnesota ‍‍‍	17	–	15	.531	33	–	29	.532
Northwestern ‍‍‍	14	–	18	.438	26	–	28	.481
Penn State ‍‍‍	13	–	19	.406	28	–	27	.509
Michigan State ‍‍‍	10	–	18	.357	22	–	31	.415
Indiana ‍‍‍	9	–	23	.281	26	–	30	.464
x – Division champion ‡ – Tournament champion y – Invited to the NCAA tournament As of June 30, 2005; Rankings from Collegiate Baseball

The 2005 Big Ten Conference baseball tournament was held at Illinois Field on the campus of the University of Illinois at Urbana–Champaign in Champaign, Illinois, from May 15 through 19. The top six teams from the regular season participated in the double-elimination tournament, the twenty fourth annual tournament sponsored by the Big Ten Conference to determine the league champion. Ohio State won their seventh tournament championship and earned the Big Ten Conference's automatic bid to the 2005 NCAA Division I baseball tournament.

== Format and seeding ==
The 2005 tournament was a 6-team double-elimination tournament, with seeds determined by conference regular season winning percentage only. Michigan claimed the fourth seed over Ohio State by tiebreaker. As in the previous three years, the top two seeds received a single bye, with the four lower seeds playing opening round games. The top seed played the lowest seeded winner from the opening round, with the second seed playing the higher seed. Teams that lost in the opening round played an elimination game.

Team	W	L	PCT	GB	Seed
Illinois	20	12	.625	–	1
Purdue	17	11	.607	1	2
Iowa	19	13	.594	1	3
Michigan	17	12	.586	1.5	4
Ohio State	17	12	.586	1.5	5
Minnesota	17	15	.531	3	6
Northwestern	14	18	.438	6	–
Penn State	13	19	.406	7	–
Michigan State	10	18	.357	8	–
Indiana	9	23	.281	11	–

== Tournament ==
Upper round 1	Upper round 2	Upper final	Final
1	Illinois	8
3	Iowa	7	6	Minnesota	11
6	Minnesota	14	6	Minnesota	6
5	Ohio State	15
2	Purdue	2
4	Michigan	3*	5	Ohio State	6
5	Ohio State	7*
5	Ohio State	3	14
6	Minnesota	4	6
Lower round 1	Lower round 2	Lower round 3	Lower final
6	Minnesota	9
1	Illinois	3†	2	Purdue	7
2	Purdue	9	2	Purdue	4†
3	Iowa	6	4	Michigan	7
4	Michigan	8

* - Indicates game required 13 innings. † - Indicates game required 11 innings.

== All-Tournament Team ==
The following players were named to the All-Tournament Team.

Pos	Name	School
P	Dan DeLucia	Ohio State
P	Matt Loberg	Minnesota
P	Jim Brauer	Michigan
C	Jake Elder	Minnesota
1B	Andy Hunter	Minnesota
1B	Eric Wolfe	Purdue
2B	Chris Getz	Michigan
2B	Joe Maciej	Minnesota
SS	Mitch Hilligoss	Purdue
3B	Shawn Roof	Illinois
OF	Mike Mee	Minnesota
OF	Steve Caravati	Ohio State
OF	Matt Angle	Ohio State
OF	Wes Schirtzinger	Ohio State
DH	Adam Abraham	Michigan

=== Most Outstanding Player ===
Steve Caravati was named Most Outstanding Player. Caravati was an outfielder for Ohio State.
