= 2003 Big Ten baseball tournament =

2003 Big Ten Conference baseball tournament
- Teams: 6
- Format: Double-elimination
- Finals site: Siebert Field; Minneapolis, MN
- Champions: Ohio State (6th title)
- Winning coach: Bob Todd (6th title)
- MVP: Brett Garrard (Ohio State)

2003 Big Ten Conference baseball standings
	Conf.				Overall
Team	W		L	PCT	W		L	PCT
Minnesota ‍†‍‍^{y}	24	–	6	.800	40	–	22	.645
No. 18 Ohio State ‍‍‡‍^{y}	20	–	12	.625	44	–	19	.698
Michigan ‍‍‍	16	–	14	.533	30	–	27	.526
Penn State ‍‍‍	17	–	15	.531	29	–	28	.509
Northwestern ‍‍‍	17	–	15	.531	25	–	25	.500
Indiana ‍‍‍	16	–	15	.516	24	–	22	.522
Purdue ‍‍‍	13	–	18	.419	29	–	26	.527
Illinois ‍‍‍	12	–	19	.387	27	–	26	.509
Michigan State ‍‍‍	10	–	19	.345	21	–	34	.382
Iowa ‍‍‍	10	–	21	.323	18	–	29	.383
x – Division champion ‡ – Tournament champion y – Invited to the NCAA tournament As of June 30, 2003; Rankings from Collegiate Baseball

The 2003 Big Ten Conference baseball tournament was held at Siebert Field on the campus of the University of Minnesota in Minneapolis, Minnesota, from May 15 through 19. The top six teams from the regular season participated in the double-elimination tournament, the twenty second annual tournament sponsored by the Big Ten Conference to determine the league champion. Ohio State won their sixth tournament championship and earned the Big Ten Conference's automatic bid to the 2003 NCAA Division I baseball tournament.

== Format and seeding ==
The 2003 tournament was a 6-team double-elimination tournament, with seeds determined by conference regular season winning percentage only. Using the same format from 2002, the top two seeds received a single bye, with the four lower seeds playing opening round games. The top seed played the lowest seeded winner from the opening round, with the second seed playing the higher seed. Teams that lost in the opening round played an elimination game.

Team	W	L	PCT	GB	Seed
Minnesota	24	6	.800	–	1
Ohio State	20	12	.625	5	2
Michigan	16	14	.533	8	3
Penn State	17	15	.531	8	4
Northwestern	15	14	.517	8.5	5
Indiana	16	15	.516	8.5	6
Purdue	13	19	.419	11.5	–
Illinois	12	19	.387	12.5	–
Michigan State	10	19	.345	13.5	–
Iowa	10	21	.323	14.5	–

== Tournament ==
Upper round 1	Upper round 2	Upper final	Final
1	Minnesota	4
3	Michigan	7	4	Penn State	3
6	Indiana	2	1	Minnesota	5
2	Ohio State	4
2	Ohio State	4
4	Penn State	6	3	Michigan	2
5	Northwestern	0
1	Minnesota	8	10
2	Ohio State	10	17
Lower round 1	Lower round 2	Lower round 3	Lower final
2	Ohio State	13
3	Michigan	2	4	Penn State	3
4	Penn State	8	4	Penn State	3
6	Indiana	8	6	Indiana	4
5	Northwestern	1

== All-Tournament Team ==
The following players were named to the All-Tournament Team.

Pos	Name	School
P	Josh Lewis	Indiana
P	Glen Perkins	Minnesota
P	Josh Newman	Ohio State
C	Jake Elder	Minnesota
1B	David Roach	Minnesota
2B	Luke Appert	Minnesota
SS	Brett Garrard	Ohio State
3B	David Harrick	Minnesota
OF	Ben Pattee	Minnesota
OF	Mike Rabin	Ohio State
OF	Christian Snavely	Ohio State

=== Most Outstanding Player ===
Brett Garrard was named Most Outstanding Player. Garrard was a shortstop for Ohio State.
