= 2001 Big Ten baseball tournament =

American college baseball tournament

2001 Big Ten Conference baseball tournament
- Teams: 6
- Format: Double-elimination
- Finals site: Bill Davis Stadium; Columbus, OH
- Champions: Minnesota (7th title)
- Winning coach: John Anderson (7th title)
- MVP: Jack Hannahan (Minnesota)

2001 Big Ten Conference baseball standings
	Conf.				Overall
Team	W		L	PCT	W		L	PCT
Ohio State ‍†‍‍^{y}	20	–	7	.741	43	–	18	.705
Purdue ‍‍‍	19	–	7	.731	32	–	24	.571
Minnesota ‍‍‡‍^{y}	19	–	8	.704	39	–	21	.650
Penn State ‍‍‍	15	–	11	.577	29	–	29	.500
Illinois ‍‍‍	13	–	14	.481	29	–	28	.509
Michigan ‍‍‍	10	–	14	.417	28	–	28	.500
Northwestern ‍‍‍	11	–	17	.393	24	–	32	.429
Michigan State ‍‍‍	9	–	17	.346	29	–	27	.518
Iowa ‍‍‍	8	–	17	.320	19	–	29	.396
Indiana ‍‍‍	7	–	19	.269	24	–	31	.436
x – Division champion ‡ – Tournament champion y – Invited to the NCAA tournament As of June 30, 2001; Rankings from Collegiate Baseball

The 2001 Big Ten Conference baseball tournament was held at Bill Davis Stadium on the campus of Ohio State University in Columbus, Ohio, from May 15 through 19. The top six teams from the regular season participated in the double-elimination tournament, the twentieth annual tournament sponsored by the Big Ten Conference to determine the league champion. Minnesota won their seventh tournament championship and earned the Big Ten Conference's automatic bid to the 2001 NCAA Division I baseball tournament.

== Format and seeding ==
The 2001 tournament was a 6-team double-elimination tournament, with seeds determined by conference regular season winning percentage only.

Team	W	L	PCT	GB	Seed
Ohio State	20	7	.741	–	1
Purdue	19	7	.731	.5	2
Minnesota	19	8	.704	1	3
Penn State	15	11	.577	4.5	4
Illinois	13	14	.481	7	5
Michigan	10	14	.417	8.5	6
Northwestern	11	17	.393	9.5	–
Michigan State	9	17	.346	10.5	–
Iowa	8	17	.320	11	–
Indiana	7	19	.269	12.5	–

== Tournament ==
First round
1	Ohio State	8
6	Michigan	4
2	Purdue	5
5	Illinois	9
3	Minnesota	4
4	Penn State	2

Second round
1	Ohio State	3
4	Penn State	4
2	Purdue	2
6	Michigan	10
5	Illinois	11
3	Minnesota	15
1	Ohio State	10
5	Illinois	0

Third round
4	Penn State	2
6	Michigan	10
3	Minnesota	6
1	Ohio State	5

Final
6	Michigan	2
3	Minnesota	3

== All-Tournament Team ==
The following players were named to the All-Tournament Team.

Pos	Name	School
P	Bobby Wood	Michigan
P	Mike Kobow	Minnesota
P	Greg Prenger	Ohio State
C	Jake Fox	Michigan
C	Josh Holthaus	Minnesota
2B	Scott Tousa	Michigan
SS	Trent McIlvain	Ohio State
3B	Jack Hannahan	Minnesota
OF	Jason Kennedy	Minnesota
OF	Sam Steidl	Minnesota
OF	Steve Caravati	Ohio State
DH	Luke Simmons	Illinois

=== Most Outstanding Player ===
Jack Hannahan was named Most Outstanding Player. Hannahan was a third baseman for Minnesota.
