= 2006 Big Ten baseball tournament =

2006 Big Ten Conference baseball tournament
- Teams: 6
- Format: Double-elimination
- Finals site: Ray Fisher Stadium; Ann Arbor, MI
- Champions: Michigan (7th title)
- Winning coach: Rich Maloney (1st title)
- MVP: Adam Abraham (Michigan)

2006 Big Ten Conference baseball standings
	Conf.				Overall
Team	W		L	PCT	W		L	PCT
Michigan ‍†‍‡‍^{y}	23	–	9	.719	43	–	21	.672
Northwestern ‍‍‍	21	–	11	.656	26	–	33	.441
Ohio State ‍‍‍	19	–	12	.613	37	–	21	.638
Minnesota ‍‍‍	17	–	14	.548	34	–	26	.567
Purdue ‍‍‍	15	–	17	.469	31	–	27	.534
Illinois ‍‍‍	15	–	17	.469	29	–	29	.500
Michigan State ‍‍‍	13	–	19	.406	26	–	30	.464
Penn State ‍‍‍	13	–	19	.406	20	–	36	.357
Iowa ‍‍‍	12	–	20	.375	23	–	30	.434
Indiana ‍‍‍	11	–	21	.344	22	–	34	.393
x – Division champion ‡ – Tournament champion y – Invited to the NCAA tournament As of June 30, 2006; Rankings from Collegiate Baseball

The 2006 Big Ten Conference baseball tournament was held at Ray Fisher Stadium on the campus of the University of Michigan in Ann Arbor, Michigan, from May 15 through 19. The top six teams from the regular season participated in the double-elimination tournament, the twenty fifth annual tournament sponsored by the Big Ten Conference to determine the league champion. Michigan won their seventh tournament championship and earned the Big Ten Conference's automatic bid to the 2006 NCAA Division I baseball tournament.

== Format and seeding ==
The 2006 tournament was a 6-team double-elimination tournament, with seeds determined by conference regular season winning percentage only. Illinois earned the fifth seed over Purdue by tiebreaker. As in the previous four years, the top two seeds received a single bye, with the four lower seeds playing opening round games. The top seed played the lowest seeded winner from the opening round, with the second seed playing the higher seed. Teams that lost in the opening round played an elimination game.

Team	W	L	PCT	GB	Seed
Michigan	23	9	.719	–	1
Northwestern	21	11	.656	2	2
Ohio State	19	12	.613	3.5	3
Minnesota	17	14	.548	5.5	4
Illinois	15	17	.469	8	5
Purdue	15	17	.469	8	6
Michigan State	13	19	.406	10	–
Penn State	13	19	.406	10	–
Iowa	12	20	.375	11	–
Indiana	11	21	.344	12	–

== Tournament ==
Upper round 1	Upper round 2	Upper final	Final
1	Michigan	1
3	Ohio State	2*	4	Minnesota	6
6	Purdue	1*	4	Minnesota	7
3	Ohio State	4
2	Northwestern	0
4	Minnesota	8	3	Ohio State	9
5	Illinois	1
4	Minnesota	9	4
1	Michigan	11	9
Lower round 1	Lower round 2	Lower round 3	Lower final
3	Ohio State	2
1	Michigan	8	1	Michigan	7
2	Northwestern	8	2	Northwestern	3
6	Purdue	10	6	Purdue	4
5	Illinois	5

* - Indicates game required 12 innings.

== All-Tournament Team ==
The following players were named to the All-Tournament Team.

Pos	Name	School
P	Adam Abraham	Michigan
P	Cole DeVries	Minnesota
P	Cory Luebke	Ohio State
C	Jeff Kunkel	Michigan
1B	Nick Recknagel	Michigan
2B	Luke MacLean	Minnesota
SS	Dan Lyons	Minnesota
3B	A. J. Scheidt	Michigan
OF	Eric Rose	Michigan
OF	Kyle Baran	Minnesota
OF	Antonie Mule	Northwestern

=== Most Outstanding Player ===
Adam Abraham was named Most Outstanding Player. Abraham was a pitcher for Michigan.
