= 2010 Big Ten baseball tournament =

2010 Big Ten Conference baseball tournament
- Teams: 6
- Format: Double-elimination with single bye for top two teams
- Finals site: Huntington Park (Columbus, Ohio); Columbus, OH
- Champions: Minnesota (9th title)
- Television: BTN

2010 Big Ten Conference baseball standings
	Conf.				Overall
Team	W		L	PCT	W		L	PCT
Minnesota ‍†‍‍	15	–	9	.625	32	–	30	.516
Michigan ‍‍‍	14	–	10	.583	35	–	22	.614
Iowa ‍‍‍	13	–	11	.542	30	–	28	.517
Northwestern ‍‍‍	13	–	11	.542	24	–	32	.429
Purdue ‍‍‍	12	–	12	.500	33	–	24	.579
Indiana ‍‍‍	12	–	12	.500	28	–	27	.509
Michigan State ‍‍‍	11	–	13	.458	34	–	19	.642
Ohio State ‍‍‍	11	–	13	.458	28	–	23	.549
Illinois ‍‍‍	10	–	14	.417	26	–	26	.500
Penn State ‍‍‍	9	–	15	.375	22	–	30	.423
† – Conference champion ‡ – Tournament champion As of June 30, 2010; Rankings from Coaches' Poll

The 2010 Big Ten Conference baseball tournament was held at Huntington Park in Columbus, Ohio, from May 23 through 26. Minnesota won their ninth tournament championship and earned the Big Ten Conference's automatic bid to the 2010 NCAA Division I baseball tournament.

== Regular season results ==
The top six teams (based on conference results) from the conference earn invites to the tournament.

Team	W	L	PCT	GB	Seed
Minnesota	15	9	.625	–	1
Michigan	14	10	.583	1	2
Iowa	13	11	.542	2	3
Northwestern	13	11	.542	2	4
Purdue	12	12	.500	4	5
Indiana	12	12	.500	4	6
Michigan State	11	13	.458	5	–
Ohio State	11	13	.458	5	–
Illinois	10	14	.417	5	–
Penn State	9	15	.375	6	–

== Format ==
The 2010 tournament was a 6-team double-elimination tournament. The top two seeds received a single bye into the semifinals (2nd Round). The 1 seed played the lowest seeded Round 1 winner, while the 2 seed played the highest seeded Round 1 winner.

== Bracket ==
Upper round 1	Upper round 2	Upper final	Final
2	Michigan	18
4	Iowa	7	4	Iowa	4
5	Purdue	5	2	Michigan	3
1	Minnesota	4
1	Minnesota	10
3	Northwestern	0	6	Indiana	8
6	Indiana	5
1	Minnesota	15
4	Iowa	5
Lower round 1	Lower round 2	Lower round 3	Lower final
2	Michigan	8
4	Iowa	8	4	Iowa	11
6	Indiana	5	5	Purdue	3
5	Purdue	11	5	Purdue	15
3	Northwestern	1
