= Charles F. Watkins =

American physician, surgeon and physiotherapist

- Born: September 28, 1872; Mount Cory, Ohio, U.S.
- Died: March 4, 1936 (aged 63); Billings, Montana, U.S.
- Occupations: Physician, surgeon, and physiotherapist

Charles Franklin Watkins (September 28, 1872 – March 4, 1936) was an American physician, surgeon and physiotherapist. He played college baseball for the University of Michigan and later served as the coach of the Michigan Wolverines baseball team for three years. He moved to Billings, Montana, in 1905 where he maintained a medical practice for approximately 30 years.

== Early years ==
Watkins was born in Mount Cory, Ohio, in 1872 to Issac and Esther Watkins (née Corwin), and the youngest of eight children. Watkins moved with his family to Reed City, Michigan, in 1878. Issac was a postmaster at Ashton, Michigan, and was active in Democratic politics until his death in 1894. Watkins attended the public schools in Reed City and graduated from Reed City High School. Watkins first played organized baseball with the Derbies, a Reed City team sponsored by a cigar maker, and later played semi-pro baseball while working at a drugstore in Traverse City, Michigan.

== University of Michigan ==
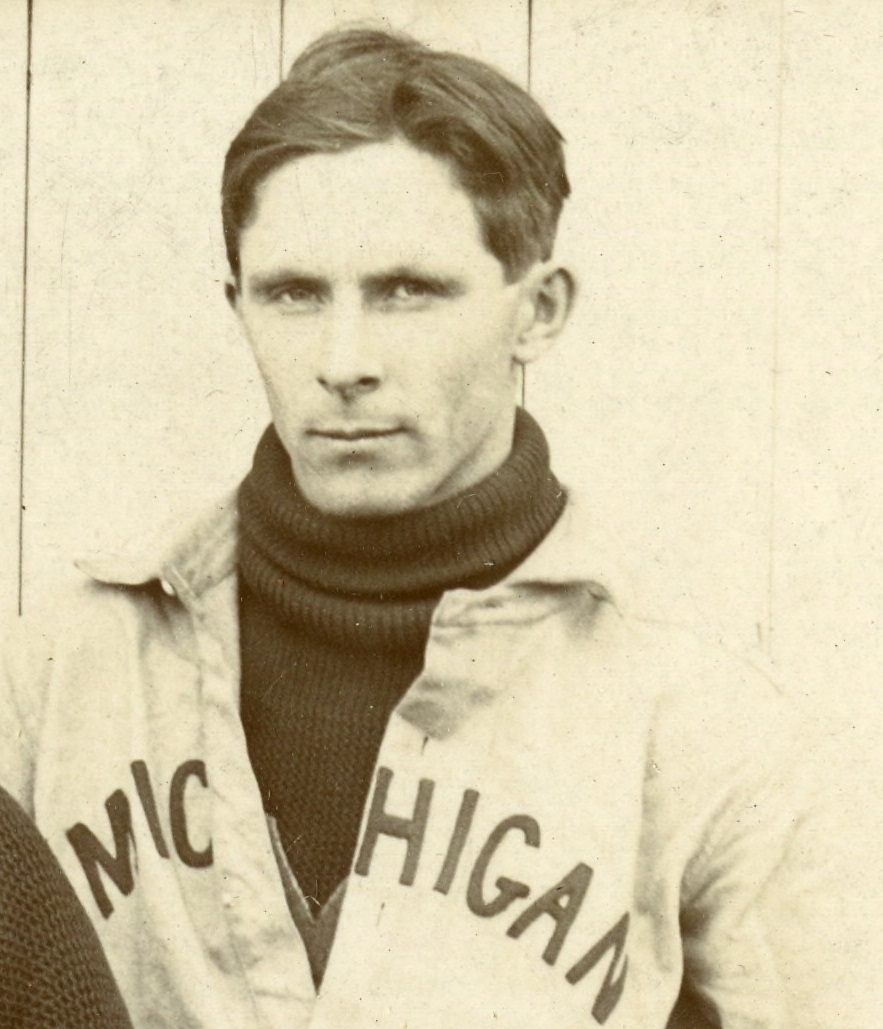
Watkins from the 1898 Michigan baseball team portrait

Watkins enrolled at the University of Michigan intending to become a pharmacist. He received a degree in chemistry in 1898 and remained at Michigan as a medical student, graduating from its Department of Medicine and Surgery in 1901. While he was a student at Michigan, Watkins played for the Michigan Wolverines baseball team as a pitcher. He was known as "Watty" during his college baseball career and was reportedly "one of the first lefthanders to develop both a curved and a slow ball and once pitched a no-hit, no-run game." He was reported to have had "uncanny control" as a pitcher and was also a solid hitter, maintaining a batting average of .300 in the deadball era. Due to his desire to enter the medical profession, Watkins turned down many offers to play Major League Baseball, including an offer from the Cleveland Indians.

Watkins continued to be associated with the Michigan baseball team as the head coach in 1897, 1898, and 1900. Watkins wrote that his "most satisfying moment in sports" took place on May 29, 1897, when the team defeated the University of Chicago at the Detroit Athletic Club.

== Medical career ==
Watkins spent two years working at a railroad hospital in Brainerd, Minnesota, specializing in surgery. He became the first assistant surgeon at the Northern Pacific Railway Hospital in Missoula, Montana, in 1903. While working at the Northern Pacific Hospital in Missoula, Watkins sustained severe burns on his left arm from the use of an old X-ray machine, which limited his physical capacity to continue his medical practice and resulted in his "virtual retirement" in approximately 1934.

In 1905, Watkins moved to Billings, Montana, where he established a private medical practice in partnership with Dr. H. E. Armstrong. He remained in Billings as a physician, surgeon and physiotherapist for approximately 30 years and became a Fellow of the American College of Surgeons in 1917. He was also the president of the Yellowstone Valley Medical Society from 1925 to 1927. At the time of his death the Billings Gazette called Watkins one of the city's "most distinguished and valuable citizens" and wrote of his devotion to his patients:

"Few physicians remained more faithful to the demands and obligations of his profession. Many are the instances that could be related of his complete obedience to the dictates of his career. During his more than 30 years here, he served hundreds of citizens who placed the greatest confidence in his medical skill and valued friendships that came through the association of doctor and patient."

Watkins presented several papers on surgery and physiotherapy to medical societies and served as chairman of the executive committee of St. Vincent Hospital in Billings for many years. He was also a surgeon for the Great Western Sugar Company and the Great Northern Railway.

Watkins was also worked as a city health officer in 1906 and as the county health officer from 1907 to 1908. He served on the Billings city council from 1917 to 1918 and was a member of the local selective service draft board during World War I.

== Family and later years ==
In May 1906 Watkins married Sophia Henrietta Bennighoff, with whom he had no children. Watkins was a member of the Billings Golf and Country Club, St. Luke's Episcopal Church, the Montana Medical Society, the Masons, the Elks and the Billings Rotary Club. In September 1918, they were living in Billings, and Watkins was working as a doctor with an office in the Electric Building in Billings. At the time of the 1920 census, Watkins and his wife remained in Billings, and Watkins was still operating a general medical practice.

Watkins was a lover of outdoor recreation and an "ardent trout fisherman" who "never lost an opportunity, when practice would permit, to get into the river." He spent much time fishing in the Boulder River and often joked that "there's a fish up there I've been trying to catch for a long time. It always comes up and winks at me but will never bite my line."

Watkins was not actively engaged in his medical practice during the last several years of his life due to failing health. He died at Billings in 1936 at the age of 63. His death was attributed to bronchopneumonia after an extended illness resulting from the x-ray burns sustained 30 years earlier. The burns reportedly "ultimately broke down his physical condition, leading to his death."
