= 2007 Big Ten baseball tournament =

College baseball tournament in the United States of America

2007 Big Ten Conference baseball tournament
- Teams: 6
- Format: Double-elimination
- Finals site: Ray Fisher Stadium; Ann Arbor, MI
- Champions: Ohio State (8th title)
- Winning coach: Bob Todd (8th title)
- MVP: Cory Luebke (Ohio State)

2007 Big Ten Conference baseball standings
	Conf.				Overall
Team	W		L	PCT	W		L	PCT
No. 20 Michigan ‍†‍‍^{y}	21	–	7	.750	42	–	19	.689
Penn State ‍‍‍	20	–	10	.667	31	–	26	.544
Minnesota ‍‍‍^{y}	18	–	9	.667	41	–	18	.695
Iowa ‍‍‍	17	–	13	.567	31	–	23	.574
Illinois ‍‍‍	16	–	14	.533	31	–	27	.534
Ohio State ‍‍‡‍^{y}	15	–	15	.500	38	–	24	.613
Michigan State ‍‍‍	15	–	16	.484	25	–	26	.490
Purdue ‍‍‍	11	–	20	.355	22	–	32	.407
Northwestern ‍‍‍	9	–	23	.281	18	–	36	.333
Indiana ‍‍‍	8	–	23	.258	19	–	35	.352
x – Division champion ‡ – Tournament champion y – Invited to the NCAA tournament As of June 30, 2007; Rankings from Collegiate Baseball

The 2007 Big Ten Conference baseball tournament was held at Ray Fisher Stadium on the campus of the University of Michigan in Ann Arbor, Michigan, from May 15 through 19. The top six teams from the regular season participated in the double-elimination tournament, the twenty sixth annual tournament sponsored by the Big Ten Conference to determine the league champion. Ohio State won their eighth tournament championship and earned the Big Ten Conference's automatic bid to the 2007 NCAA Division I baseball tournament.

== Format and seeding ==
The 2007 tournament was a 6-team double-elimination tournament, with seeds determined by conference regular season winning percentage only. Minnesota earned the second seed over Penn State by tiebreaker. As in the previous five years, the top two seeds received a single bye, with the four lower seeds playing opening round games. The top seed played the lowest seeded winner from the opening round, with the second seed playing the higher seed. Teams that lost in the opening round played an elimination game.

Team	W	L	PCT	GB	Seed
Michigan	21	7	.750	–	1
Minnesota	18	9	.667	2.5	2
Penn State	20	10	.667	2	3
Iowa	17	13	.567	5	4
Illinois	16	14	.533	6	5
Ohio State	15	15	.500	7	6
Michigan State	15	16	.484	7	–
Purdue	11	20	.355	12	–
Northwestern	9	23	.281	13	–
Indiana	8	23	.258	14.5	–

== Tournament ==
Upper round 1	Upper round 2	Upper final	Final
1	Michigan	2
3	Penn State	3	6	Ohio State	4
6	Ohio State	10	6	Ohio State	10†
2	Minnesota	9†
2	Minnesota	10
4	Iowa	3	5	Illinois	3
5	Illinois	12
6	Ohio State	4
2	Minnesota	2
Lower round 1	Lower round 2	Lower round 3	Lower final
2	Minnesota	4
5	Illinois	2	3	Penn State	3
1	Michigan	5*	3	Penn State	6
6	Penn State	5	3	Penn State	6*
4	Iowa	3

* - Indicates game required 10 innings. † - Indicates game required 11 innings.

== All-Tournament Team ==
The following players were named to the All-Tournament Team.

Pos	Name	School
P	Bill Johnson	Minnesota
P	Cory Luebke	Ohio State
P	Jake Hale	Ohio State
C	Kevin Carlson	Minnesota
1B	Bryan Jost	Minnesota
2B	Matt Cavagnaro	Penn State
SS	Dan Lyons	Minnesota
3B	Tony Kennedy	Ohio State
OF	Derek VanBuskirk	Michigan
OF	Mike Mee	Minnesota
OF	Kyle Baran	Minnesota
OF	Matt Nohelty	Minnesota

=== Most Outstanding Player ===
Cory Luebke was named Most Outstanding Player. Luebke was a pitcher for Ohio State.
