= Jack Hannahan =

American baseball player (born 1980)

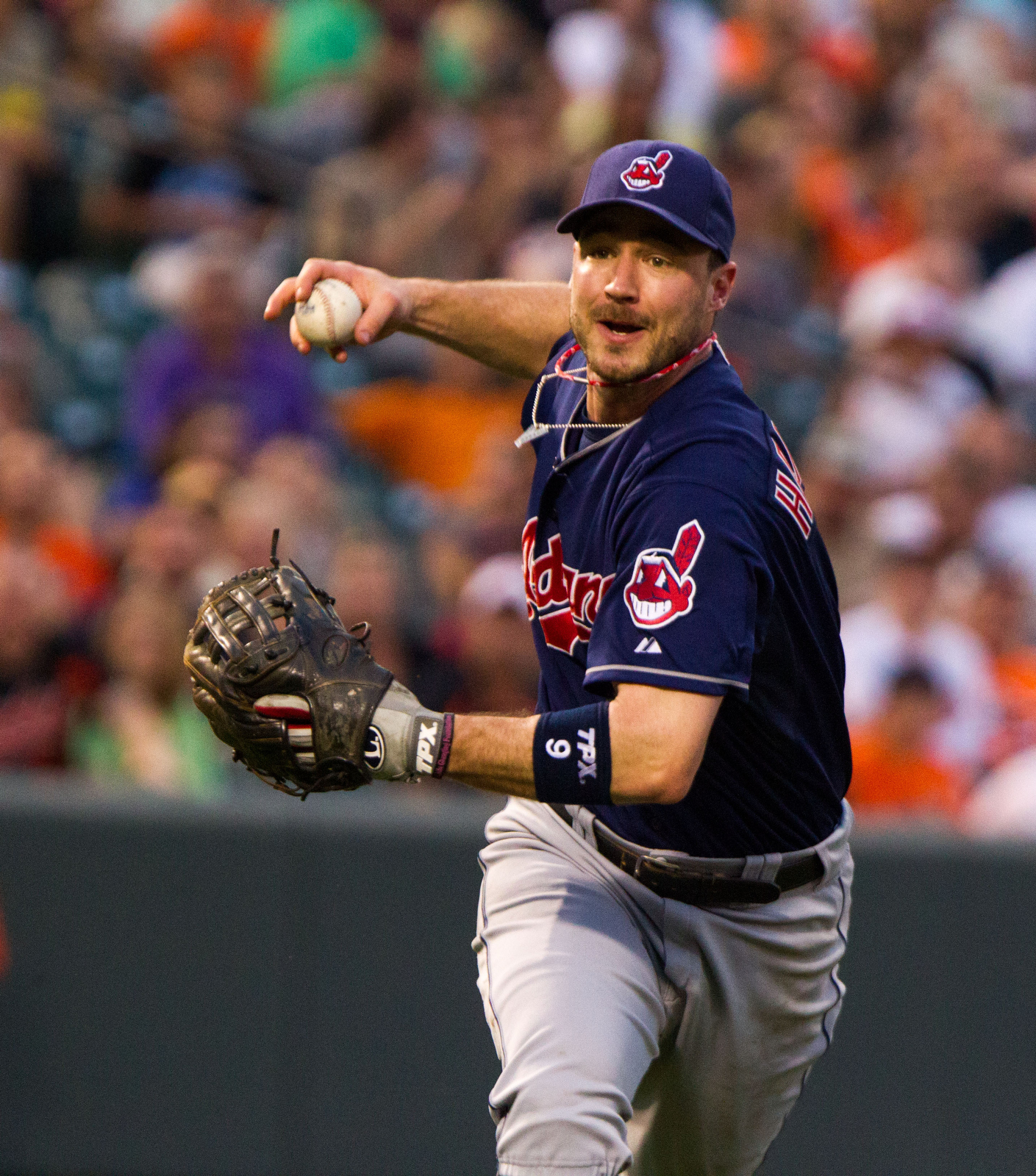
- Hannahan with the Cleveland Indians
- Third baseman
- Born: March 4, 1980 (age 46); St. Paul, Minnesota, U.S.
- Batted: Left Threw: Right

Professional debut
- MLB: May 25, 2006, for the Detroit Tigers
- KBO: May 7, 2015, for the LG Twins

Last appearance
- MLB: September 27, 2014, for the Cincinnati Reds
- KBO: June 13, 2015, for the LG Twins

MLB statistics
- Batting average: .231
- Home runs: 29
- Runs batted in: 175

KBO statistics
- Batting average: .327
- Home runs: 4
- Runs batted in: 22
- Stats at Baseball Reference

Teams
- Detroit Tigers (2006); Oakland Athletics (2007–2009); Seattle Mariners (2009); Cleveland Indians (2011–2012); Cincinnati Reds (2013–2014); LG Twins (2015)

John Joseph Hannahan IV (born March 4, 1980) is an American former professional baseball utility player. He played in Major League Baseball (MLB) for the Detroit Tigers, Oakland Athletics, Seattle Mariners, Cleveland Indians, and Cincinnati Reds and in the KBO League for the LG Twins.

== Amateur career ==
Hannahan attended Cretin-Derham Hall High School in Saint Paul, Minnesota. He played football as a defensive back and earned All-Conference honors in basketball. He was the Gatorade Player of the Year for baseball in Minnesota in 1998. He attended the University of Minnesota, where he played college baseball for the Minnesota Golden Gophers. As a freshman, he hit .360 with 28 runs, nine doubles, four home runs and 30 RBIs in 1999. That summer, Hannahan played for the Mankato Mashers of the Northwoods League, a collegiate summer league.

In 2000, Hannahan batted .327 with 46 runs, 18 doubles, four triples, eight home runs, 43 RBIs and nine stolen bases during his sophomore season. He was named Big Ten Player of the Year, First-Team All-Big Ten, and a third-time All-American by Collegiate Baseball during his junior season after hitting .372 with 65 runs, 20 doubles, four triples, 15 home runs, 63 RBIs and 16 stolen bases. He led the Big Ten in runs, home runs and RBIs.

== Professional career ==
=== Detroit Tigers ===
The Detroit Tigers selected Hannahan in the third round of the 2001 Major League Baseball draft. Hannahan made his major league debut on May 26, 2006, playing first base. He went 0-for-9 with the Tigers in 2006. He began the 2007 season with the Triple-A Toledo Mud Hens. He hit .295 with 13 home runs. He finished second in the International League with 76 walks.

=== Oakland Athletics ===
On August 13, 2007, he was traded to the Oakland Athletics for outfielder Jason Perry. The Athletics added Hannahan to their roster, filling in at third base as Eric Chavez went on the disabled list. On August 15, Hannahan got his first major league hit, a double, off Mark Buehrle of the Chicago White Sox. On August 20, against the Toronto Blue Jays, Hannahan hit his first career home run. Hannahan started 40 of the Athletics' final 43 games at third base.

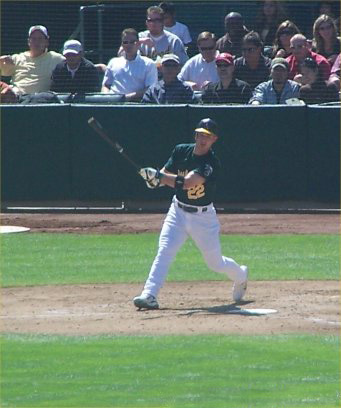
Hannahan batting with the Oakland Athletics in 2008

In 2008, Hannahan was on the major league roster the entire season, serving as the primary third baseman while Eric Chavez was on the disabled list most of the year. Following the 2009 spring training camp, he was sent to the Sacramento River Cats.

=== Seattle Mariners ===
Hannahan was traded to the Seattle Mariners for pitcher Justin Souza on July 11, 2009.

With the Mariners holding an 11–5 lead over the Kansas City Royals on August 6, Seattle manager Don Wakamatsu substituted Hannahan for shortstop Jack Wilson, who was experiencing minor discomfort in his right triceps area. This marked the first time Hannahan played shortstop at the major league level.

He was briefly the starting third baseman for the Mariners after Adrián Beltré was put on the disabled list. Hannahan finished the season with a combined .213 batting average between the A's and the Mariners with 14 doubles, two triples, four home runs and 19 RBIs in 103 games.

Hannahan begain the 2010 season on the disabled list with a strained groin. On May 28, he was designated for assignment by Seattle. He accepted an outright assignment to the Triple-A Tacoma Rainiers.

=== Boston Red Sox ===
On July 22, 2010, Hannahan was traded to the Boston Red Sox for cash considerations or a player to be named later. He was assigned to Triple-A Pawtucket. He did not appear in the majors in 2010.

=== Cleveland Indians ===
On December 3, 2010, Hannahan signed a minor league contract with the Cleveland Indians with an invitation to major league spring training. He earned a spot with the Indians after spring training. He led American League third basemen in fielding percentage, not committing an error in his final 37 games of the season. On August 31, he hit two home runs and drove in the winning run in the 16th inning. He returned to Cleveland in 2012.

=== Cincinnati Reds ===
On December 13, 2012, Hannahan signed a two-year, $4 million contract with a club option for 2015 with the Cincinnati Reds and was expected to provide depth throughout the infield, specifically at third base. Initially reported as a one-year deal, he earned $1 million in each of his guaranteed seasons, and his option was worth $4 million with a $2 million buyout.

=== LG Twins ===
On December 23, 2014, Hannahan signed a one-year, $1 million contract with the LG Twins of the KBO League. In 32 games for the Twins in 2015, he batted .327/.400/.523 with four home runs and 22 RBI. On July 16, Hannahan was released from the Twins due to injuries, and Luis Jiménez was signed to replace him. On July 18, Hannahan held a press conference to announce his retirement from professional baseball.

== Post-playing career ==
In 2025, Hannahan was the assistant coach at his alma mater, Cretin-Derham Hall High School, helping them win the 2025 Minnesota Class AAAA State Championship title. He also took the role of Assistant Athletic Director of Facilities there.

== Personal life ==
Hannahan is married to his wife Jenny. They have three children: Johnny, Lenny, and Lucy.
