= 1996 Big Ten baseball tournament =

1996 Big Ten Conference baseball tournament
- Teams: 4
- Format: Double-elimination
- Finals site: Beaver Field (baseball); State College, PA
- Champions: Indiana (1st title)
- Winning coach: Bob Morgan (1st title)
- MVP: Dan Ferrell (Indiana)

1996 Big Ten Conference baseball standings
	Conf.				Overall
Team	W		L	PCT	W		L	PCT
Penn State ‍†‍‍	19	–	8	.704	32	–	24	.571
Indiana ‍‍‡‍^{y}	18	–	8	.692	43	–	18	.705
Illinois ‍‍‍	17	–	10	.630	37	–	22	.627
Michigan ‍‍‍	17	–	11	.607	24	–	30	.444
Minnesota ‍‍‍	15	–	12	.556	30	–	26	.536
Ohio State ‍‍‍	15	–	13	.536	36	–	20	.643
Iowa ‍‍‍	13	–	13	.500	25	–	22	.532
Northwestern ‍‍‍	10	–	18	.357	26	–	29	.473
Purdue ‍‍‍	8	–	19	.296	22	–	32	.407
Michigan State ‍‍‍	4	–	24	.143	14	–	41	.255
x – Division champion ‡ – Tournament champion y – Invited to the NCAA tournament As of June 30, 1996; Rankings from Collegiate Baseball

The 1996 Big Ten Conference baseball tournament was held at Beaver Field on the campus of Pennsylvania State University in State College, Pennsylvania from May 15 through 19. The top four teams from the regular season participated in the double-elimination tournament, the sixteenth annual tournament sponsored by the Big Ten Conference to determine the league champion. Indiana won their first tournament championship and earned the Big Ten Conference's automatic bid to the 1996 NCAA Division I baseball tournament.

== Format and seeding ==
The 1996 tournament was a 4-team double-elimination tournament, with seeds determined by conference regular season winning percentage only.

Team	W	L	PCT	GB	Seed
Penn State	19	8	.704	–	1
Indiana	18	8	.692	.5	2
Illinois	17	10	.630	2	3
Michigan	17	11	.607	2.5	4
Minnesota	15	12	.556	4	–
Ohio State	15	13	.536	4.5	–
Iowa	13	13	.500	5.5	–
Northwestern	10	18	.357	9.5	–
Purdue	8	19	.296	11	–
Michigan State	4	24	.143	15.5	–

== Tournament ==
Upper round 1
1	Penn State	14
4	Michigan	3
2	Indiana	6
3	Illinois	3
Lower round 1
4	Michigan	4
3	Illinois	7

Upper final
1	Penn State	2
2	Indiana	6
Lower final
1	Penn State	3
3	Illinois	11

Final
2	Indiana	5	6
3	Illinois	8	4

== All-Tournament Team ==
The following players were named to the All-Tournament Team.

Pos	Name	School
P	Jason Wollard	Illinois
P	Dan Ferrell	Indiana
C	Matt Braughler	Indiana
1B	Phil Bertolotti	Penn State
2B	Brian McClure	Illinois
SS	Josh Klimek	Illinois
3B	Mike Crotty	Indiana
OF	Danny Rhodes	Illinois
OF	Ryan Dillon	Indiana
OF	Mike Spisak	Indiana
OF	Jason Alcaraz	Michigan
DH	Todd McClure	Illinois

=== Most Outstanding Player ===
Dan Ferrell was named Most Outstanding Player. Ferrell was a pitcher for Indiana.
