= Bobby Scales =

American baseball player (born 1977)

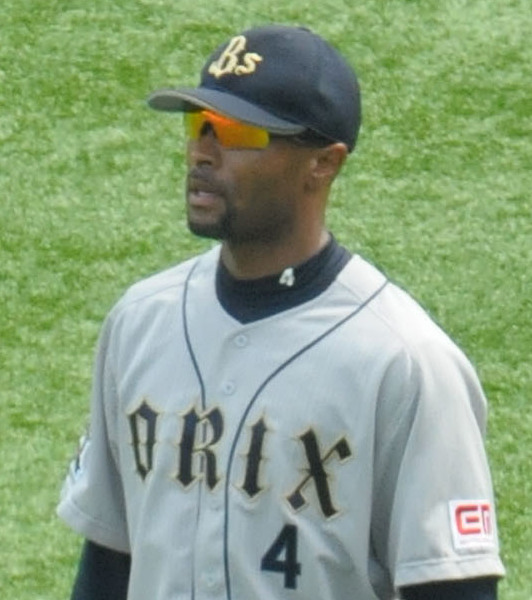
- Scales with the Orix Buffaloes
- Left fielder / Third baseman / Second baseman
- Born: October 4, 1977 (age 48); Southfield, Michigan, U.S.
- Batted: Switch Threw: Right

Professional debut
- MLB: May 5, 2009, for the Chicago Cubs
- NPB: July 7, 2011, for the Hokkaido Nippon-Ham Fighters

Last appearance
- MLB: October 3, 2010, for the Chicago Cubs
- NPB: September 26, 2012, for the Orix Buffaloes

MLB statistics
- Batting average: .248
- Home runs: 3
- Runs batted in: 17

NPB statistics
- Batting average: .262
- Home runs: 14
- Runs batted in: 53
- Stats at Baseball Reference

Teams
- Chicago Cubs (2009–2010); Hokkaido Nippon-Ham Fighters (2011); Orix Buffaloes (2012)

Bobby Leon Scales (born October 4, 1977) is an American former professional baseball second baseman. A switch hitter who throws right-handed, Scales played for the University of Michigan and was selected by the San Diego Padres in the 14th round (442nd overall) of the 1999 MLB draft. While at Michigan, he played for the Corvallis Knights in the West Coast League, an independent summer collegiate league. He played in Major League Baseball (MLB) for the Chicago Cubs and in Nippon Professional Baseball (NPB) for the Hokkaido Nippon-Ham Fighters and the Orix Buffaloes.

== Playing career ==
=== Minor leagues ===
Within three years of being drafted by the Padres organization, Scales was discouraged from lack of play and even planned to quit; but infield coach Tony Franklin talked him into staying. That same season when Bernie Castro, the top prospect starting ahead of Scales got injured, he finally got his chance to start. Signed by the Philadelphia Phillies to a minor league contract on January 11, 2006, Scales played the 2006 season with the Scranton/Wilkes-Barre Red Barons. The Boston Red Sox organization signed him to a minor league contract on December 20, 2006, and invited him to participate in the Red Sox' 2007 spring training.

=== Chicago Cubs ===
In 2008, Scales played for the Chicago Cubs organization and became a free agent at the end of the season. In January 2009, he re-signed with the Cubs.

==== Major leagues ====
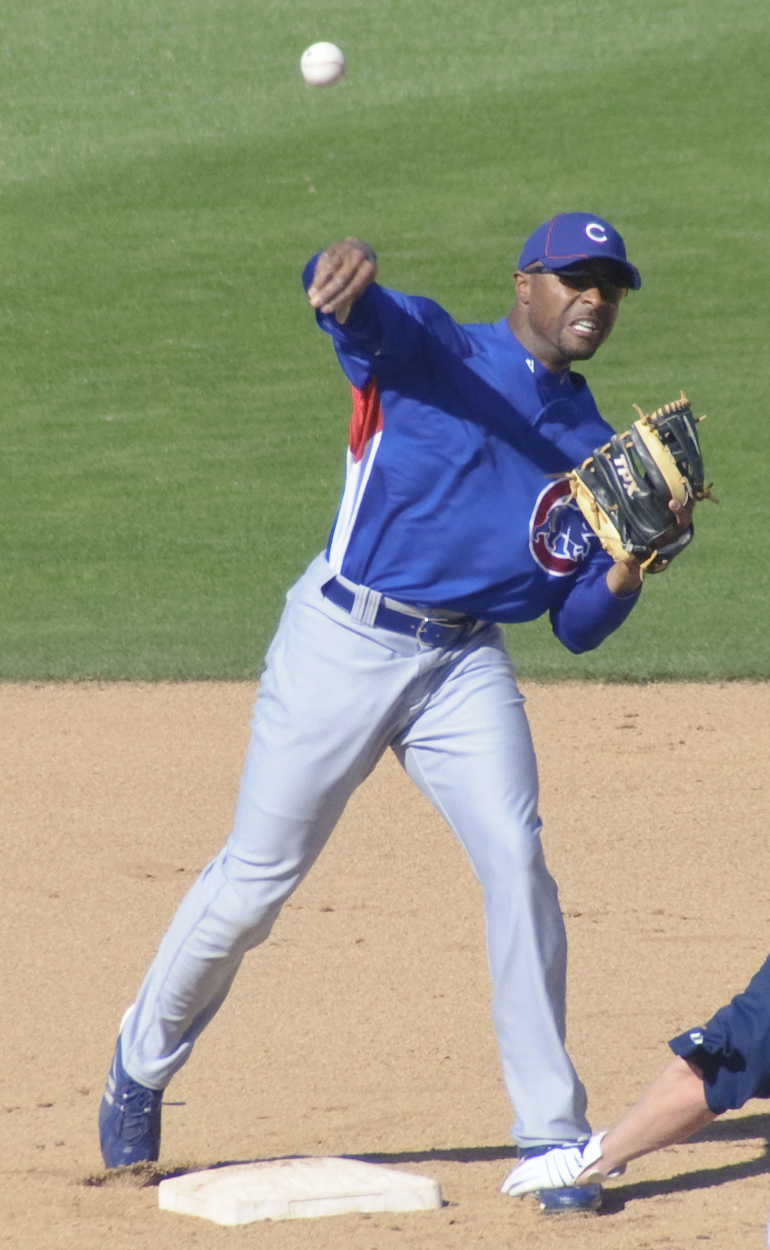
Scales with the Chicago Cubs

He was called up to the Cubs major league team on May 4, 2009, after starting pitcher Carlos Zambrano was put on the 15-day disabled list. He made his Major League debut, starting at second base, at the age of 31 on May 5 against the San Francisco Giants, a game in which he recorded his first Major League hit against Tim Lincecum, winner of the 2008 National League Cy Young Award. He scored his first Major League run later that inning when Sean Marshall singled. On May 8, Scales hit his first Major League triple off of Dave Bush. On May 12, Scales hit his first major league home run off of Edwin Moreno of the San Diego Padres. On May 14, to further his case to stay in the bigs, Scales hit two doubles while driving in four runs in the Cubs' win over the San Diego Padres. He recorded a six-game hit streak immediately after being called up, but that streak was lost on May 16. However, that same game, Scales scored the winning run in the bottom of the 9th inning against the Houston Astros. On May 27, Aaron Miles was placed on the DL, and the team needed someone who could play backup shortstop, causing Scales to be sent down to the Triple-A Iowa Cubs. The next day, May 28, Scales was recalled from Iowa due to Ryan Freel being placed on the disabled list. Scales then went on to hit a pinch-hit home run in the bottom of the 8th off Los Angeles Dodgers pitcher Randy Wolf.

On November 22, 2010, Scales re-signed with the Cubs organization on a minor league contract. He played in 68 games for Iowa in 2011, slashing .304/.424/.535 with nine home runs, 43 RBI, and five stolen bases.

=== Hokkaido Nippon-Ham Fighters ===
Scales signed with the Hokkaido Nippon-Ham Fighters of Nippon Professional Baseball in Japan on June 27, 2011.

=== Chicago Cubs (second stint) ===
On January 27, 2012, Scales signed a minor league contract with the Chicago Cubs.

=== New York Mets ===
After leaving the Cubs, Scales signed a minor league contract with the New York Mets on April 1. On May 12 he was released by the Mets.

=== Orix Buffaloes ===
After his departure from the Mets organization he signed with the Orix Buffaloes.

== Post-playing career ==
On November 9, 2012, Scales was hired to be the Los Angeles Angels of Anaheim' director of player development.

Scales was hired by the Pittsburgh Pirates to be the organization's assistant fielding coordinator in 2019.

In 2023, Scales was hired as a part-time analyst for road games on the Detroit Tigers Radio Network.

== Personal life ==
Bobby's wife Monica has a doctorate in health communication. In 2005 Scales was named the Portland Beavers Community Player of the Year which highlighted the time and effort he put into helping the greater Portland community. He also is a substitute teacher at Milton High School in Milton, Georgia during the offseason.
