= Bill Davis Stadium =

Baseball stadium in Columbus, Ohio, United States

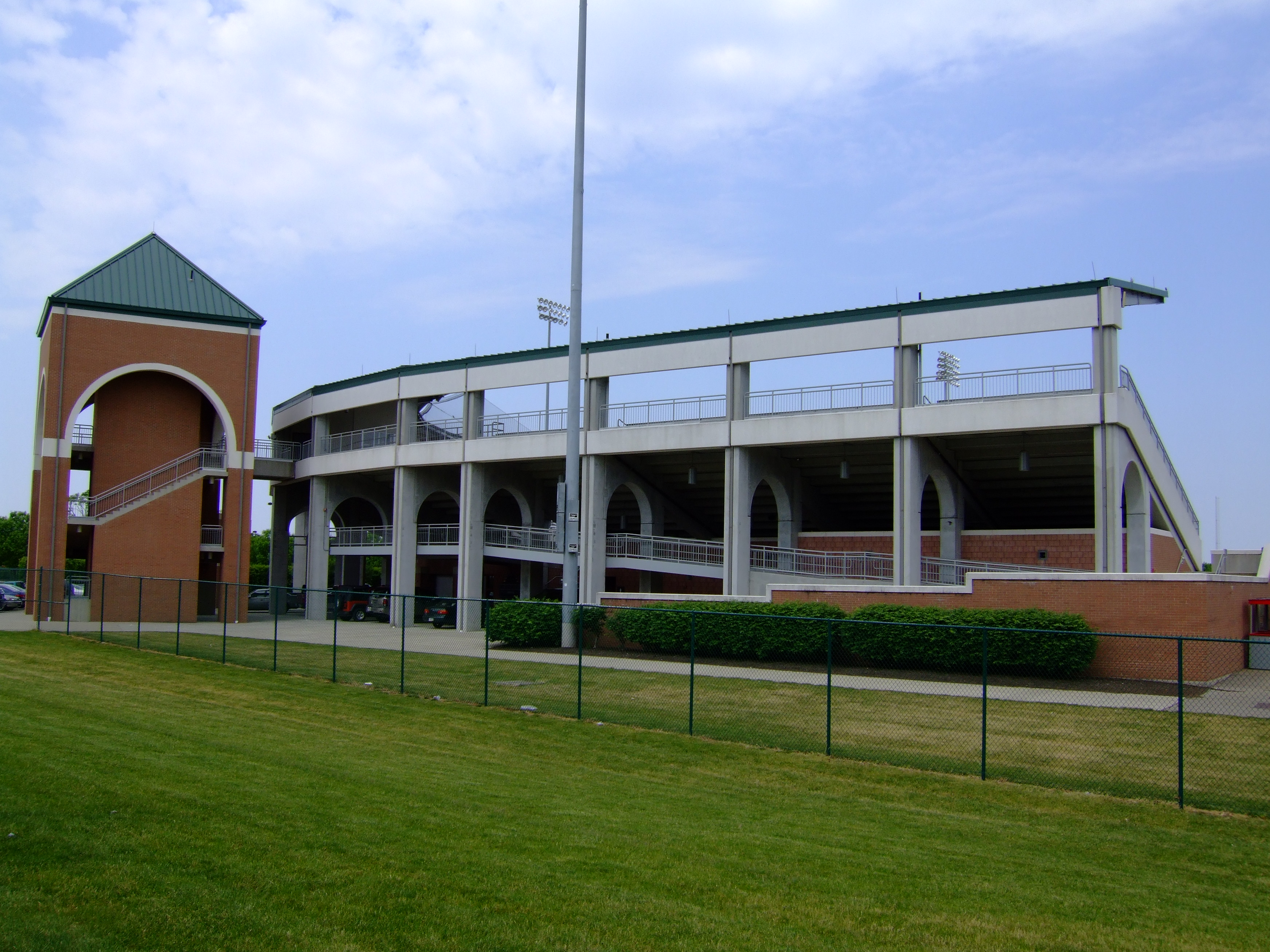
- Interactive map of Bill Davis Stadium
- Location: 650 Borror Drive; Columbus, Ohio 43210
- Coordinates: 40°00′34″N 83°01′37″W
- Owner: Ohio State University Department of Athletics
- Operator: Ohio State University Department of Athletics
- Capacity: 4,450
- Surface: AstroTurf GameDay Grass 3D
- Record attendance: 5,360, vs. Minn., May 18, 2002
- Field size: Left Field – 330 ft (100 m); Left-Center – 370 ft (110 m); Center Field – 400 ft (120 m); Right-Center – 370 ft (110 m); Right Field – 330 ft (100 m); Fence Height – 8 ft (2.4 m)
- Public transit: 1

Construction
- Opened: First game: March 14, 1997; Official dedication: May 2, 1997
- Cost: $4.7 million
- Architects: NBBJ Sports and Entertainment

Tenant
- Ohio State Buckeyes baseball (1997–present)

Bill Davis Stadium is a baseball venue located in Columbus, Ohio, United States. The stadium is home to the Ohio State Buckeyes baseball team of the Big Ten Conference and is named for William C. "Bill" Davis, a businessman and Ohio State alumnus.

The stadium has a capacity of 4,450 and had a record attendance of 5,360, versus the Minnesota Golden Gophers baseball team on May 18, 2002. In 2010, the Buckeyes ranked 46th among Division I baseball programs in attendance, averaging 1,235 per home game.

The venue hosted the Big Ten Tournament in 1999, 2001, and 2010.

In 2011, a $500,000 donation from former Buckeye and MLB All-Star/World Series Champion Nick Swisher saw artificial turf installed and the playing field named in his honor. The official name of the Buckeyes' home is "Nick Swisher Field at Bill Davis Stadium".

In 2012, college baseball writer Eric Sorenson ranked the stadium as the most underrated venue in Division I baseball.

== See also ==
- List of NCAA Division I baseball venues
