= Cory Luebke =

American baseball player (born 1985)

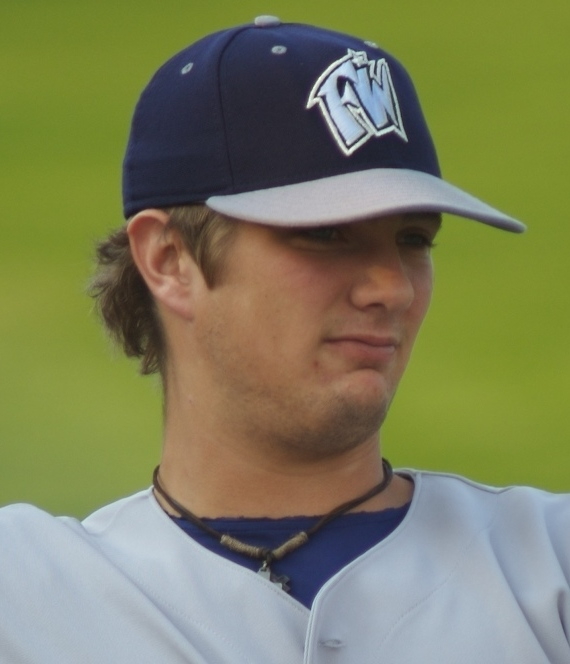
- Luebke with the Fort Wayne Wizards
- Pitcher
- Born: March 4, 1985 (age 40); Coldwater, Ohio, U.S.
- Batted: Right Threw: Left

MLB debut
- September 3, 2010, for the San Diego Padres

Last MLB appearance
- June 17, 2016, for the Pittsburgh Pirates

MLB statistics
- Win–loss record: 10–13
- Earned run average: 3.52
- Strikeouts: 204
- Stats at Baseball Reference

Teams
- San Diego Padres (2010–2012); Pittsburgh Pirates (2016)
Medals
Men's baseball
Representing United States
Baseball World Cup
Gold medal – first place	2009 Nettuno	National team

Cory Robert Luebke (born March 4, 1985) is an American former professional baseball pitcher. He played in Major League Baseball (MLB) for the San Diego Padres and Pittsburgh Pirates.

== Amateur career ==
A native of Maria Stein, Ohio, Luebke attended Marion Local High School and Ohio State University. In 2006, he played collegiate summer baseball with the Falmouth Commodores of the Cape Cod Baseball League. He was selected by the Padres in the first round of the 2007 Major League Baseball draft.

== Professional career ==
=== San Diego Padres ===
==== Minor leagues ====
Luebke spent his first professional season, 2007 at three different levels of the San Diego Padres' organization. He started with the Low–A Eugene Emeralds of the Northwest League. He went 3–0 with 26 strikeouts and a 1.46 ERA in eight games, three starts. He was soon promoted to the Single–A Fort Wayne Wizards of the Midwest League, where he went 1–2 with 30 strikeouts and a 3.33 ERA in five games, all starts. He was then promoted again to the High–A Lake Elsinore Storm of the California League, where he went 1–1 with five strikeouts and a 7.71 ERA in two games, one start. Luebke went a combined 5–3 with 61 strikeouts and a 3.07 ERA in 58 2/3 innings pitched.

In 2008, Luebke started the season with High–A Lake Elsinore, but was later sent down to Single–A Fort Wayne. With Lake Elsinore he went 3–6 with a 6.84 ERA in 17 games, 15 starts. During his time with Fort Wayne, Luebke went 3–3 with 40 strikeouts and a 2.89 ERA in 10 games, all starts. Luebke went a combined 6–9 with 100 strikeouts with a 5.12 ERA in 128 1/3 innings pitched.

Luebke split the 2009 season with High–A Lake Elsinore and the Double-A San Antonio Missions. He began the season with Lake Elsinore for the second consecutive season. He went 8–2 with 80 strikeouts and a 2.34 ERA in 14 games, all starts. He was then promoted to the Missions where he went 3–2 with a 3.70 ERA in nine games, all starts. Luebke went a combined 11–4 with 112 strikeouts and a 2.78 ERA in 129 2/3 innings pitched. Luebke attributed his success in '09 to working out kinks in his delivery. He was named the number 12 prospect in the Texas League by Baseball America. Luebke pitched for Team USA in the 2009 Baseball World Cup. He threw a near perfect game against Team Canada. He started the championship game, striking out seven and pitching 4 1/3 innings.

On July 11, 2010, Luebke was promoted to the Triple-A Portland Beavers of the Pacific Coast League. While with San Antonio, Luebke went 5–1 with a 2.40 ERA and a WHIP of 0.94. He made 9 starts with Portland, going 5–0 with a 2.97 ERA.

==== Major leagues ====
Luebke was promoted to the Padres on September 1, 2010 and made his first major league start on September 3, where he got his first loss, pitching 5 innings and giving up four runs. He earned his first career win in his next start, throwing 6 innings and only giving up 2 hits and 1 walk.

Luebke started 2011 in the Padres bullpen. He pitched in 29 games in relief, posting a 3.23 ERA in 39 innings with 43 strike-outs against 15 walks. On June 26, Luebke was promoted to the Padres starting rotation. He started 17 games, going 8–9 with a 3.31 ERA. Over 100 2/3 innings as a starter, he struck out 111 batters and walked 29, holding opposing hitters to a .218 batting average. His success in 2011 raised his profile to that of a front-of-the-rotation starter.

On March 30, 2012, Luebke agreed to a four-year extension with the Padres worth a guaranteed $12 million that includes 2 club options for 2016 and 2017. He received a $500,000 bonus for the deal. He earned $0.5 million in 2012, $1 million in 2013, $3 million in 2014 and $5.25 million in 2015. His 2016 option was worth $7.5 million and had a $1.75 million buyout, and his 2017 option was worth $10 million with a $250,000 buyout. Luebke could have earned up to $27.75 million.

Luebke opened 2012 in the Padres starting rotation and made five starts, going 3–1 with a 2.61 ERA, before being removed from the rotation with elbow tightness and soreness. On May 23, 2012, Cory Luebke underwent Tommy John surgery to repair a partial tear of the ulnar collateral ligament (UCL) in his left elbow, causing him to miss the rest of the 2012 season. Rehabilitation from Tommy John for pitchers usually ranged from 12 to 18 months. Luebke was expected to pitch after the All-Star break in 2013, but he was shut down in September after more than three bullpen sessions. He began throwing again in November. By late December, the team was considering him as a reliever for Opening Day in 2014.

On February 4, 2014, it was announced that Luebke had a tear in his UCL and would need a second reconstructive surgery on his elbow and miss the 2014 season. He became a free agent following the 2015 season.

=== Pittsburgh Pirates ===
On February 11, 2016, the Pittsburgh Pirates signed Luebke to a minor league contract. He had his contract selected to the major league roster on April 3. He was designated for assignment on June 18, after struggling to a 9.35 ERA in 9 games. On June 26, he cleared waivers and was released.

=== Miami Marlins ===
On July 7, 2016, Luebke signed a minor league contract with the Miami Marlins organization. He made four scoreless appearances split between the High–A Jupiter Hammerheads, Double–A Jacksonville Suns, and Triple–A New Orleans Zephyrs. Luebke elected free agency following the season on November 7.

=== Chicago White Sox ===
On January 17, 2017, Luebke signed a minor league contract with the Chicago White Sox. Luebke retired from baseball on May 8, after two appearances for the Triple–A Charlotte Knights.
