= Illinois Field =

Baseball field in Champaign, Illinois, U.S.

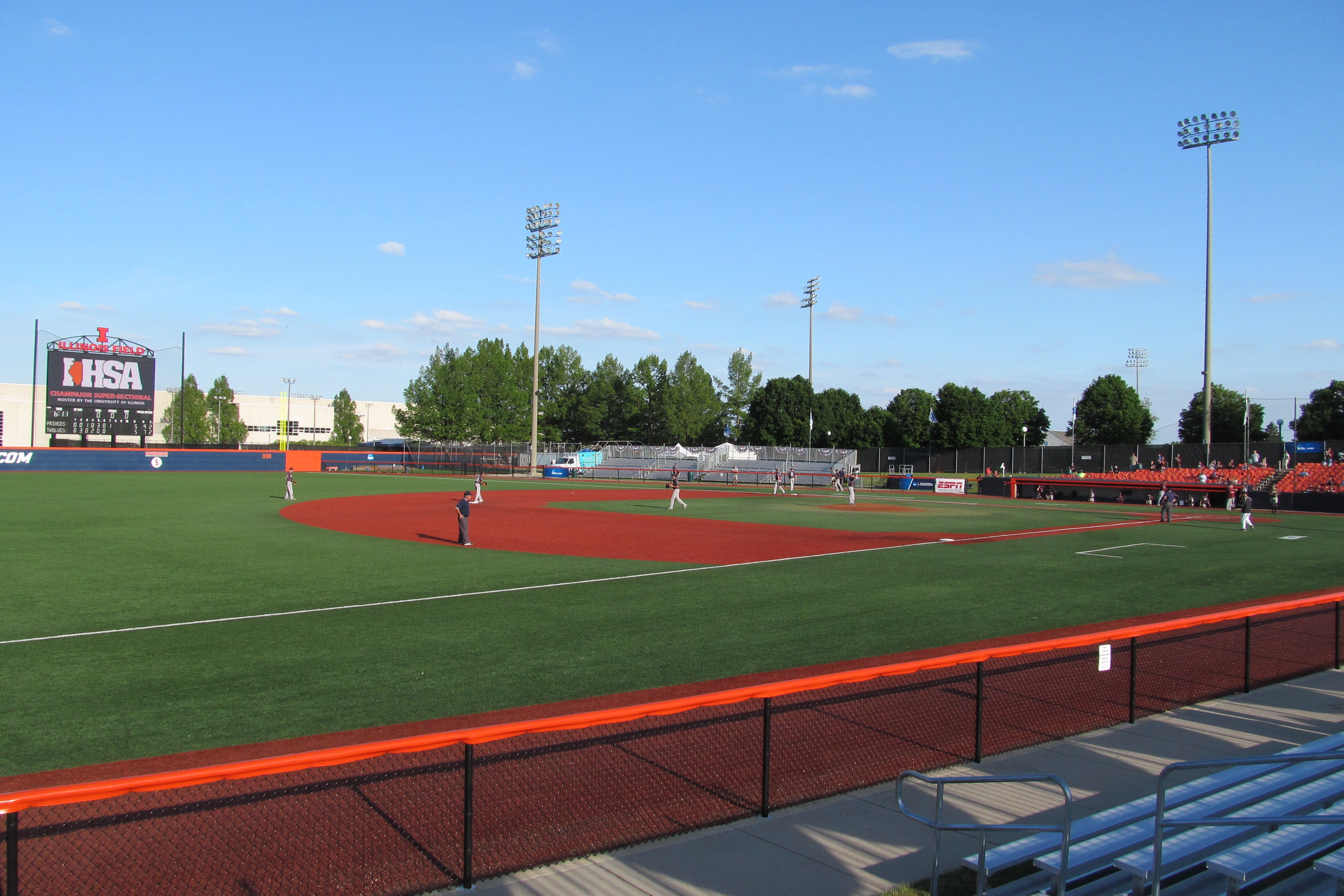
- Illinois Field, June, 2015

- Location in Illinois Location in the United States
- Former names: Proano Stadium (1988–1991)
- Address: 1601 E. Kirby Avenue Champaign, Illinois 61820
- Coordinates: 40.096869°N 88.229796°W
- Owner: University of Illinois
- Operator: University of Illinois
- Capacity: 1,500 seats 3,000 (with lawn seating)
- Type: Stadium
- Event: Baseball
- Surface: FieldTurf
- Record attendance: 5,214
- Field size: LF: 330 ft (100.6 m); LC: 370 ft (112.8 m); CF: 400 ft (121.9 m); RC: 370 ft (112.8 m); RF: 330 ft (100.6 m)
- Public transit: MTD

Construction
- Built: 1987
- Opened: 24 March 1988
- Renovated: 1999
- Architect: Heery Fabrap

Tenants
- Illinois Fighting Illini (NCAA) (1988–present); Big Ten baseball tournament (1998, 2005); Champaign-Urbana Bandits (GCL) (1994)

Illinois Field is a baseball venue in Champaign, Illinois, home to the University of Illinois Fighting Illini baseball team. It is located in the sports complex at the University of Illinois near the Champaign-Urbana border. It is a short distance east of State Farm Center and Memorial Stadium.

== History ==
Illinois Field was constructed at its current location in 1988. The first game played there was a victory for Illinois over Western Illinois on March 24, 1988. Prior to this, the home of Illinois baseball was located farther north on campus at the intersection of Wright Street and University Avenue, which is now part of the engineering campus. That site, also known as Illinois Field, had been in use since 1884.

Illinois Field was originally known as Proano Stadium, after University of Illinois graduate Lou Proano. Proano was the then-CEO of a major cutlery company. However, the university was forced to rename the stadium Illinois Field in 1991 after Proano filed for bankruptcy.

Several significant renovations have taken place since the new stadium was built. First, in 1996, the clubhouse was renovated and expanded to twice its original size. Second, in 1999, lights were added to allow for night games. Illinois also won the first night game in Illinois Field history on April 27, 1999 against Illinois State. Third, in 2007, the grass playing surface was replaced with a synthetic FieldTurf surface that mimics natural grass without the maintenance requirements.

While Illinois Field has served as the home field for the University of Illinois Baseball Team for the past 20 years, it has not always been an exclusive relationship. In 1994, Illinois shared the premises with the Champaign-Urbana Bandits, a minor league team in the short-lived Great Central League. In 2007, the city of Champaign, the University of Illinois, and the Frontier League discussed expanding the field and to allow the sale of alcohol at games to accommodate for a new minor league franchise. The talks quickly ended.

Illinois Field hosted the 2015 Men's NCAA Regional where the local Fighting Illini won the championship, and the 2015 Super Regional. Additionally, Illinois Field has served as the location for two Big Ten baseball tournaments, in 1998 and 2005.

== Features ==
=== Playing field ===
Illinois Field has a FieldTurf playing surface which covers the entire playing field with the exception of the pitching mound. The field's dimensions are symmetric with a distance of 330 feet down the lines, 370 feet to the gaps, and 400 feet to center field. There are also two batting cages and a bullpen with two mounds down each foul line. The dugouts for both teams are in-ground.

=== Stands ===
The stadium part of Illinois Field features bleacher seating for 1500 spectators. These seats wrap around the foul territory behind home plate from first-base to third-base. Additional space for another 1500 spectators is available on the grass areas located down the foul lines. Temporary seating can also be installed in this area for big games or events, like the Big Ten Tournament.

Attendance Records:

- single game: 5,214 fans on May 8, 2009
- weekend series: 8,202 fans on May 8–10, 2009
- season average: 1,270 fans per game in 1990
- season: 17,722 fans in 2005

=== Clubhouse ===
Down the left field line at Illinois Field there is a building that serves as the clubhouse for the Illini team, coaches, and staff. The clubhouse contains space for a variety of functions for the team. The main feature of the clubhouse is the team locker room. Other parts of the clubhouse are a coaches’ locker room, training room and a player's lounge that also serves as a recruiting lounge. The player's lounge also contains video equipment that allows players and coaches to watch film.

=== Press box ===
The press box at Illinois Field seats 25 people and is located above the permanent seating section behind home plate. This facility is used by any media members, VIPs and game day staff. Radio broadcasts of games are broadcast from the press box. The Wall of Fame, located behind the press box, honors past Illinois Baseball greats.

=== Concessions ===
Illinois Field has a concession stand inside its building; this feature is behind the press box to create a concourse area. While the concession stand serves the typical ballpark food items, like hot dogs and nachos, there are also several cart vendors at various games that sell specialty items. For apparel and other merchandise sales, a trailer is operated by a local sports apparel store during games.

== See also ==
- List of NCAA Division I baseball venues
