= 2008 Big Ten baseball tournament =

2008 Big Ten Conference baseball tournament
- Teams: 6
- Format: Double-elimination
- Finals site: Ray Fisher Stadium; Ann Arbor, MI
- Champions: Michigan (8th title)
- Winning coach: Rich Maloney (2nd title)
- MVP: Michael Powers (Michigan)

2008 Big Ten Conference baseball standings
	Conf.				Overall
Team	W		L	PCT	W		L	PCT
No. 20 Michigan ‍†‍‡‍^{y}	26	–	5	.839	46	–	14	.767
Purdue ‍‍‍	21	–	10	.677	32	–	26	.552
Penn State ‍‍‍	17	–	15	.531	27	–	31	.466
Illinois ‍‍‍	16	–	15	.516	31	–	25	.554
Ohio State ‍‍‍	15	–	15	.500	30	–	26	.536
Indiana ‍‍‍	15	–	17	.469	31	–	30	.508
Northwestern ‍‍‍	14	–	18	.438	21	–	28	.429
Michigan State ‍‍‍	12	–	18	.400	24	–	29	.453
Minnesota ‍‍‍	10	–	21	.323	20	–	35	.364
Iowa ‍‍‍	10	–	22	.313	22	–	33	.400
x – Division champion ‡ – Tournament champion y – Invited to the NCAA tournament As of June 30, 2008; Rankings from Collegiate Baseball

The 2008 Big Ten Conference baseball tournament was held at Ray Fisher Stadium on the campus of the University of Michigan in Ann Arbor, Michigan, from May 15 through 19. The top six teams from the regular season participated in the double-elimination tournament, the twenty seventh annual tournament sponsored by the Big Ten Conference to determine the league champion. Michigan won their eighth tournament championship and earned the Big Ten Conference's automatic bid to the 2008 NCAA Division I baseball tournament.

== Format and seeding ==
The 2008 tournament was a 6-team double-elimination tournament, with seeds determined by conference regular season winning percentage only. As in the previous six years, the top two seeds received a single bye, with the four lower seeds playing opening round games. The top seed played the lowest seeded winner from the opening round, with the second seed playing the higher seed. Teams that lost in the opening round played an elimination game.

Team	W	L	PCT	GB	Seed
Michigan	26	5	.839	–	1
Purdue	21	10	.677	5	2
Penn State	17	15	.531	9.5	3
Illinois	16	15	.516	10	4
Ohio State	15	15	.500	11	5
Indiana	15	17	.469	12	6
Northwestern	14	18	.438	12.5	–
Michigan State	12	18	.400	13.5	–
Minnesota	10	21	.323	16	–
Iowa	10	22	.312	16.5	–

== Tournament ==
Upper round 1	Upper round 2	Upper final	Final
1	Michigan	5
3	Penn State	6	4	Illinois	2
6	Indiana	1	1	Michigan	6
2	Purdue	1
2	Purdue	15
4	Illinois	3	3	Penn State	6
5	Ohio State	2
1	Michigan	3
2	Purdue	2
Lower round 1	Lower round 2	Lower round 3	Lower final
2	Purdue	11
3	Penn State	8	6	Indiana	7
4	Illinois	7	6	Indiana	11
5	Ohio State	8*	6	Indiana	14
6	Indiana	10*

* - Indicates game required 10 innings.

== All-Tournament Team ==
The following players were named to the All-Tournament Team.

Pos	Name	School
P	Kevin Manson	Illinois
P	Chris Fetter	Michigan
P	Zach Putnam	Michigan
P	Michael Powers	Michigan
C	Dan Black	Purdue
1B	Jerrud Sabourin	Indiana
2B	Cory Kovanda	Ohio State
SS	Tyler Cox	Indiana
3B	Adam Abraham	Michigan
OF	Chris Hervey	Indiana
OF	Kevin Cislo	Michigan
OF	Jon Moore	Purdue
DH	Michael Earley	Indiana
DH	Rob Yodice	Penn State

=== Most Outstanding Player ===
Michael Powers was named Most Outstanding Player. Powers was a pitcher for Michigan.
