= Illinois Fighting Illini baseball =

Baseball team of the University of Illinois

Illinois Fighting Illini baseball team
- 2026 Illinois Fighting Illini baseball team
- Founded: 1879
- University: University of Illinois Urbana-Champaign
- Athletic director: Josh Whitman
- Head coach: Dan Hartleb (21st season)
- Conference: Big Ten
- Location: Champaign, Illinois
- Home stadium: Illinois Field (capacity: 3,000)
- Nickname: Fighting Illini
- Colors: Orange and blue

NCAA regional champions
- 2015

NCAA tournament appearances
- 1947, 1948, 1962, 1963, 1989, 1990, 1998, 2000, 2011, 2013, 2015, 2019, 2024

Conference tournament champions
- 1989, 1990, 2000, 2011

Conference regular season champions
- 1900, 1903, 1904, 1906, 1907, 1908, 1910, 1911, 1914, 1915, 1916, 1921, 1922, 1927, 1931, 1934, 1937, 1940, 1947, 1948, 1952, 1953, 1962, 1963, 1989, 1990, 1998, 2005, 2011, 2015, 2024

The Illinois Fighting Illini baseball team represents the University of Illinois Urbana-Champaign in NCAA Division I college baseball. The baseball team participates in the Big Ten Conference. The Fighting Illini play all on-campus home games at Illinois Field. Coached by two-time Big Ten Coach of the Year Dan Hartleb, the Fighting Illini have appeared in five NCAA tournaments in his tenure.

== History ==
=== Coaching history ===
Coach	Years	Record	Conference record	Conference titles	NCAA appearances
No coach	1879–1881	2–1			
No team	1882	0–0			
No coach	1883–1891	30–17–1			
Edward K. Hall	1892–1894	30–17			
No Coach	1895	10–4			
George Huff	1896–1919	314–97–4		11	
George Clark	1920	16–8			
Carl Lundgren	1920–1934	209–78–14		5	
Wally Roettger	1935–1951	212–109–6		4	
Lee Eilbracht	1952–1978	518–395–6		4	3
Tom Dedin	1979–1987	268–234–6			
Augie Garrido	1988–1990	111–57		2	2
Richard "Itch" Jones	1991–2005	474–373–1		2	2
Dan Hartleb	2006–present	567–419–1	253–200	3	5
Totals		2,764–1,796–39 (.605)	1,093–852–10 (.562)	30	12

=== Year-by-year results ===
Year	Head coach	Overall	Conference	Conf. finish	Notes
1879	–	1–0	–	–	No Coach
1880	–	1–0	–	–	No Coach
1881	–	0–1	–	–	No Coach
1882	–	–	–	–	No Team
1883	–	3–0	–	–	No Coach
1884	–	1–1	–	–	No Coach
1885	–	1–0	–	–	No Coach
1886	–	4–2	–	–	No Coach
1887	–	4–4	–	–	No Coach
1888	–	3–4	–	–	No Coach
1889	–	1–2–1	–	–	No Coach
1890	–	5–3	–	–	No Coach
1891	–	8–2	–	–	No Coach
1892	Ed Hall	8–3	–	–	–
1893	Ed Hall	14–8	–	–	–
1894	Ed Hall	8–6	–	–	–
1895	–	10–4	–	–	No Coach
1896	George Huff	15–4	2–4	3rd	–
1897	George Huff	6–5	3–3	T-2nd	–
1898	George Huff	6–7	4–6	3rd	–
1899	George Huff	11–6	9–4	2nd	–
1900	George Huff	12–2	8–2	1st	Big Ten Champions
1901	George Huff	12–7	6–4	3rd	–
1902	George Huff	12–4	8–3	2nd	–
1903	George Huff	17–1	11–1	1st	Big Ten Champions
1904	George Huff	24–4	8–2	1st	Big Ten Champions
1905	George Huff	14–5	7–5	2nd	–
1906	George Huff	13–3	8–3	1st	Big Ten Champions
1907	George Huff	10–1	7–0	1st	Big Ten Champions
1908	George Huff	11–3	11–3	1st	Big Ten Champions
1909	George Huff	11–3	9–3	2nd	–
1910	George Huff	14–0	11–0	1st	Big Ten Champions
1911	George Huff	18–2	14–1	1st	Big Ten Champions
1912	George Huff	13–3–1	10–2–1	2nd	–
1913	George Huff	11–5–1	8–4	T-2nd	–
1914	George Huff	11–7–1	7–3	1st	Big Ten Champions
1915	George Huff	18–1–1	9–1–1	1st	Big Ten Champions
1916	George Huff	17–5	8–1	1st	Big Ten Champions
1917	George Huff	13–7	8–3	2nd	–
1918	George Huff	13–6	7–3	2nd	–
1919	George Huff	13–5	7–4	2nd	–
1920	George Clark	16–8	6–4	2nd	–
1921	Carl Lundgren	17–3	10–1	1st	Big Ten Champions
1922	Carl Lundgren	17–2–1	8–2	1st	Big Ten Champions
1923	Carl Lundgren	14–6–1	7–4	3rd	–
1924	Carl Lundgren	10–6–1	4–3–1	5th	–
1925	Carl Lundgren	12–8	6–5	T-5th	–
1926	Carl Lundgren	16–7–1	7–4	T-3rd	–
1927	Carl Lundgren	10–7–3	7–3–1	T-1st	Big Ten Champions
1928	Carl Lundgren	32–12–5	6–6	8th	–
1929	Carl Lundgren	13–7–2	6–5	4th	–
1930	Carl Lundgren	15–5	8–2	2nd	–
1931	Carl Lundgren	15–4	8–2	1st	Big Ten Champions
1932	Carl Lundgren	10–5	7–3	2nd	–
1933	Carl Lundgren	13–3	8–2	T-2nd	–
1934	Carl Lundgren	15–3	9–1	1st	Big Ten Champions
1935	Wally Roettger	12–4	7–3	T-2nd	–
1936	Wally Roettger	13–4	8–2	2nd	–
1937	Wally Roettger	14–3	9–1	1st	Big Ten Champions
1938	Wally Roettger	8–8	4–4	T-6th	–
1939	Wally Roettger	7–7–2	4–5	8th	–
1940	Wally Roettger	16–5	9–3	1st	Big Ten Champions
1941	Wally Roettger	13–7	7–4	3rd	–
1942	Wally Roettger	9–9	5–7	T-5th	–
1943	Wally Roettger	8–6	5–3	T-3rd	–
1944	Wally Roettger	9–3–2	5–2–2	3rd	–
1945	Wally Roettger	10–10–1	6–5–1	4th	–
1946	Wally Roettger	13–8	6–3	T-3rd	–
1947	Wally Roettger	22–6	9–3	1st	Big Ten Champions
1948	Wally Roettger	20–7–1	10–2	1st	Big Ten Champions
1949	Wally Roettger	9–8–1	6–5–1	5th	–
1950	Wally Roettger	13–6	6–5	T-4th	–
1951	Wally Roettger	16–9	8–3	2nd	–
1952	Lee Eilbracht	20–11–1	10–5	T-1st	Big Ten Champions
1953	Lee Eilbracht	17–6	10–3	T-1st	Big Ten Champions
1954	Lee Eilbracht	16–15	4–11	T-9th	–
1955	Lee Eilbracht	14–10	7–6	4th	–
1956	Lee Eilbracht	15–18–1	4–11	10th	–
1957	Lee Eilbracht	17–9	7–4	T-2nd	–
1958	Lee Eilbracht	18–10	8–6	4th	–
1959	Lee Eilbracht	22–9	9–6	T-2nd	–
1960	Lee Eilbracht	21–10	6–8	7th	–
1961	Lee Eilbracht	22–8	9–4	4th	–
1962	Lee Eilbracht	25–6	13–2	1st	Big Ten Champions
1963	Lee Eilbracht	21–15	10–5	1st	Big Ten Champions
1964	Lee Eilbracht	9–22	1–14	10th	–
1965	Lee Eilbracht	14–9	8–6	5th	–
1966	Lee Eilbracht	14–14	5–7	6th	–
1967	Lee Eilbracht	17–21	5–11	9th	–
1968	Lee Eilbracht	18–19	7–10	6th	–
1969	Lee Eilbracht	22–20	11–7	2nd	–
1970	Lee Eilbracht	19–16–1	8–10	T-6th	–
1971	Lee Eilbracht	20–16–1	10–7–1	4th	–
1972	Lee Eilbracht	16–21	5–9	8th	–
1973	Lee Eilbracht	21–13	8–10	T-7th	–
1974	Lee Eilbracht	27–11	9–7	4th	–
1975	Lee Eilbracht	25–17–1	4–11–1	9th	–
1976	Lee Eilbracht	20–22	3–12	10th	–
1977	Lee Eilbracht	23–25	8–10	6th	–
1978	Lee Eilbracht	25–22–1	6–12	9th	–
1979	Tom Dedin	14–30–1	3–15	10th	–
1980	Tom Dedin	18–33	6–10	T-6th	–
1981	Tom Dedin	35–26	11–3	2nd-West (4th Tourn.)	–
1982	Tom Dedin	49–23	14–2	1st-West (4th Tourn.)	–
1983	Tom Dedin	23–24–2	6–9	T-3rd-West	–
1984	Tom Dedin	22–30	3–10	5th-West	–
1985	Tom Dedin	46–21	13–4	1st-West (4th Tourn.)	–
1986	Tom Dedin	33–20–2	8–8	4th-West	–
1987	Tom Dedin	32–24	9–7	T-2nd-West	–
1988	Augie Garrido	26–20	12–16	7th	–
1989	Augie Garrido	42–16	17–11	T-2nd	Big Ten Tournament champions
1990	Augie Garrido	43–21	19–9	T-2nd	Big Ten Tournament champions
1991	Richard “Itch” Jones	26–30	13–15	7th	–
1992	Richard “Itch” Jones	36–20	16–12	4th	–
1993	Richard “Itch” Jones	32–23	12–16	T-8th	–
1994	Richard “Itch” Jones	26–26	12–16	T-7th	–
1995	Richard “Itch” Jones	25–31	14–14	T-5th	–
1996	Richard “Itch” Jones	37–22	17–10	3rd	–
1997	Richard “Itch” Jones	32–27	17–11	T-3rd	–
1998	Richard “Itch” Jones	42–21	19–5	1st	Big Ten Champions
1999	Richard “Itch” Jones	34–22	15–12	3rd	–
2000	Richard “Itch” Jones	41–23	17–11	T-3rd	Big Ten Tournament champions
2001	Richard “Itch” Jones	29–28	13–14	5th	–
2002	Richard “Itch” Jones	32–19	14–15	T-6th	–
2003	Richard “Itch” Jones	27–26	12–19	8th	–
2004	Richard “Itch” Jones	22–33	11–21	9th	–
2005	Richard “Itch” Jones	33–23–1	20–12	1st	Big Ten Champions
2006	Dan Hartleb	29–29	15–17	T-5th	–
2007	Dan Hartleb	31–27	16–14	5th	–
2008	Dan Hartleb	31–25	16–15	4th	–
2009	Dan Hartleb	34–20	16–8	4th	–
2010	Dan Hartleb	26–26	10–14	9th	–
2011	Dan Hartleb	30–27	15–9	1st	Big Ten Champions; Big Ten Tournament champions
2012	Dan Hartleb	28–25	11–13	T-6th	–
2013	Dan Hartleb	35–20	14–10	T-5th	–
2014	Dan Hartleb	32–21	17–7	3rd	–
2015	Dan Hartleb	50–10–1	21–1	1st	Champaign Regional champions Big Ten Champions; School record 50 wins School & Big Ten record 27 straight wins
2016	Dan Hartleb	28–23	12–12	T-8th	–
2017	Dan Hartleb	23–28	9–15	10th	–
2018	Dan Hartleb	33-20	15-9	4th	–
2019	Dan Hartleb	36-21	15-9	T-3rd	–
2020	Dan Hartleb	8-5			–
2021	Dan Hartleb	22-22	22-22	7th	–
2022	Dan Hartleb	31-22	17-7	T–2nd	–
2023	Dan Hartleb	25-27	12-12	T–7th	–
2024	Dan Hartleb	35-21	18-6	1st	

=== NCAA tournament results ===
Year	Record	Pct	Notes
1947	0-1	.000	Eastern Playoff
1948	0-2	.000	Eastern Playoff
1962	1-2	.333	District 4
1963	3-2	.600	District 4
1989	1-2	.333	Northeast Regional
1990	2-2	.500	South II Regional
1998	3-2	.600	South I Regional
2000	1-2	.333	Clemson Regional
2011	2-2	.500	Fullerton Regional
2013	1-2	.333	Nashville Regional
2015	3-2	.600	Champaign Super Regional
2019	0-2	.000	Oxford Regional
2024	1-2	.333	Lexington Super Regional

=== Attendance records ===
Top Attendance Figures at Illinois Field
Rank	Attendance	Opponent	Date
1.	5,214	Ohio State	May 8, 2009
2.	4,229	Iowa	April 15, 1995
3.	4,019	Indiana	April 17, 2015
4.	3,800	Michigan	April 21, 1990
5.	3,767	Vanderbilt	June 8, 2015
6.	3,605	Vanderbilt	June 6, 2015
7.	3,398	Ohio	May 29, 2015
8.	3,394	Northwestern	April 16, 1994
9.	3,227	Ohio State	May 4, 2018
10.	3,185	Indiana	April 27, 2014

== Retired numbers ==
Fighting Illini in professional baseball
MiLB
Total Currently Playing:	13
MLB
All-Time Total MLB Players	73
Total Currently Playing:	1
Notable achievements
Illini in the World Series:	8
Number of World Series Titles Claimed by Illini:	12
National Baseball Hall of Famers:	1

Illinois Fighting Illini retired numbers
No.	Player	Position	Career
5	Lou Boudreau	3B	1937–1938

== Current MLB players ==
- Michael Massey (Kansas City Royals) (2022–present)

== Individual honors ==
=== Player of the year awards ===
- 2018

Bren Spillane, (1B/OF), Collegiate Baseball Player of the Year

=== All-Americans ===
Note that information below is referenced from Illinois Fighting Illini Media Guide.

- 1947

Andy Phillip, (1B)
Lee Eilbracht, (C)

- 1948

Russ Steger, (OF)

- 1951

Dick Raklovits, (3B)

- 1959

Bob Klaus, (SS)

- 1962

Tom Fletcher, (P)

- 1973

Bob Polock, (2B)

- 1987

Darrin Fletcher, (C)

- 1988

Mark Dalesandro, (2B)

- 1989

Sean Mulligan, (C)
Charles "Bubba" Smith, (UT)

- 1990

Mark Dalesandro, (2B)

- 1991

Sean Mulligan, (C)
Charles "Bubba" Smith, (UT)
Larry Sutton, (OF)
Scott Spiezio, (IF)

- 1992

Larry Sutton, (OF)

- 1993

Scott Spiezio, (IF)

- 1994

Forry Wells, (OF)
Tom Sinak, (OF)

- 1996

Josh Klimek (SS)
Brian McClure, (2B)

- 1998

James Tow, (P)
D.J. Svihlik, (2B)

- 1999

James Tow, (P)
D.J. Svihlik, (2B)
Luke Simmons, (DH)

- 2000

Jason Anderson (P)
Andy Schutzenhofer, (1B)
D.J. Svihlik, (2B)

- 2001

Andy Dickinson (P)

- 2002

Andy Dickinson (P)
Drew Davidson, (OF)

- 2003

Eric Eymann, (SS)

- 2005

Drew Davidson, (OF)

- 2007

Lars Davis (C)

- 2013

Justin Parr, (OF)

- 2015

Tyler Jay, (P)

- 2016

Cody Sedlock, (P)

- 2018

Bren Spillane, (1B/OF)

== Illini in the World Series ==
- Carl Lundgren: 1907, 1908
- Garland "Jake" Stahl: 1912
- Wally Roettger: 1931
- Lou Boudreau: 1948
- Tom Haller: 1962
- Ed Spiezio: 1967, 1968
- Ken Holtzman: 1972, 1973, 1974
- Scott Spiezio: 2002, 2006
