= Big Ten Conference Baseball Coach of the Year =

- Awarded for: the most outstanding baseball head coach in the Big Ten Conference
- Country: United States
- First award: 1988
- Currently held by: John Savage, UCLA

The Big Ten Conference Baseball Coach of the Year is a baseball award given to the most outstanding baseball head coach in the Big Ten Conference.

== Key ==
	Awarded one of the following National Coach of the Year awards that year: Collegiate Baseball Coach of the Year (CB); Baseball America Coach of the Year (BA)
Coach (X)	Denotes the number of times the coach had been awarded the Coach of the Year award at that point
*	Elected to the National College Baseball Hall of Fame as a coach but is no longer active
*^	Active coach who has been elected to the National College Baseball Hall of Fame (as a coach)
Conf. W–L	Conference win–loss record for that season
Conf. St.^{T}	Conference standing at year's end (^{T}denotes a tie)
Overall W–L	Overall win–loss record for that season
Season^{‡}	Team won the College World Series

== Winners ==
Season	Coach	School	National Coach of the Year Awards	Conf. W–L	Conf. St.	Overall W–L	Reference
1988	Tom Smith	Michigan State	—	16–12	3	41–20	
1989	Bob Todd*	Ohio State	—	16–12	4	34–27	
1990	Duane Banks	Iowa	—	22–6	1	38–19	
1991	Paul Stevens	Northwestern	—	15–12	4	27–28-1	
1992	Tom Smith (2)	Michigan State	—	17–11	3	35–19	
1993	Bob Morgan	Indiana	—	15–12	4	38–21	
1994	Bob Todd* (2)	Ohio State	—	25–2	1	49–09	
1995	Paul Stevens (2)	Northwestern	—	15–13	3	36–19	
1996	Joe Hindelang	Penn State	—	19–8	1	32–24	
1997	Geoff Zahn	Michigan	—	17–9	1	36–22	
1998	Itch Jones	Illinois	—	19–5	1	39–19	
1999	Bob Todd* (3)	Ohio State	—	25–3	1	50–14	
2000	John Anderson	Minnesota	—	20–8	1	38–22	
2001	Bob Todd* (4)	Ohio State	—	20–7	1	43–18	
2002	John Anderson (2)	Minnesota	—	18–10	1	32–26	
2003	John Anderson (3)	Minnesota	—	24–6	1	40–22	
2004	John Anderson (4)	Minnesota	—	21–10	1	38–23	
2005	Itch Jones (2)	Illinois	—	20–12	1	33–23	
2006	Paul Stevens (3)	Northwestern	—	21–11	2	26–33	
2007	Rich Maloney	Michigan	—	21–7	1	42–19	
2008	Rich Maloney (2)	Michigan	—	26–5	1	46–14	
2009	Bob Todd* (5)	Ohio State	—	18–6	1	42–19	
2010	John Anderson (5)	Minnesota	—	15–9	1	32–30	
2011	Jake Boss	Michigan State	—	15–9	1	36–21	
2012	Doug Schreiber	Purdue	—	17–7	1	41–12	
2013	Tracy Smith	Indiana	—	17–7	1	49–16	
2014	Tracy Smith (2)	Indiana	—	21–3	1	44–15	
2015	Dan Hartleb	Illinois	—	21–1	1	48–8-1	
2016	John Anderson (6)	Minnesota	—	16–7	1	35–21	
2017	Darin Erstad	Nebraska	—	16–7–1	1	35–22–1	
2018	John Anderson (7)	Minnesota	—	18–4	1	41–13	
2019	Jeff Mercer	Indiana	—	17–7	1	37–23	
2021	Will Bolt	Nebraska	—	31–12	1	31–12	
2022	Rob Vaughn	Maryland	—	18–5	1	44–10	
2023	Rob Vaughn (2)	Maryland	—	17–7	1	37–19	
2024	Dan Hartleb (2)	Illinois	—	18–6	1	35–21	
2025	Mark Wasikowski	Oregon	—	22–8	1^{T}	42–16	
2026	John Savage	UCLA	—	28–2	1	48–6	

== Winners by school ==
School (year joined)	Winners	Years
Minnesota (1906)	7	2000, 2002, 2003, 2004, 2010, 2016, 2018
Ohio State (1913)	5	1989, 1994, 1999, 2001, 2009
Illinois (1896)	4	1998, 2005, 2015, 2024
Indiana (1906)	4	1993, 2013, 2014, 2019
Michigan (1896)	3	1997, 2007, 2008
Michigan State (1951)	3	1988, 1992, 2011
Northwestern (1898)	3	1991, 1995, 2006
Maryland (2014)	2	2022, 2023
Nebraska (2012)	2	2017, 2021
Iowa (1906)	1	1990
Oregon (2025)	1	2025
Penn State (1992)	1	1996
Purdue (1906)	1	2012
UCLA (2024)	1	2026
