= Paul Stevens (baseball) =

American college baseball coach (born 1953)

Current position
- Title: Assistant coach
- Team: Chicago
- Conference: Midwest

Biographical details
- Born: November 26, 1953 (age 72); Oak Lawn, Illinois, U.S.

Playing career
- 1973–1974: South Alabama
- 1975–1976: Lewis

Coaching career (HC unless noted)
- 1985–1987: Northwestern (Asst.)
- 1988–2015: Northwestern
- 2016–present: Chicago (Asst.)

Head coaching record
- Overall: 674–836–6
- Tournaments: 4–14 (Big Ten)

Accomplishments and honors

Awards
- Big Ten Coach of the Year: 1991, 1995, 2006
Medal record
Men's baseball
Representing United States
Pan American Games
Silver medal – second place	1975 Mexico City	Team

Paul Stevens (born November 26, 1953) is an American college baseball coach who has been as an assistant coach for the University of Chicago Maroons baseball team since 2016. Before coming to Chicago, he was the head coach of the Northwestern Wildcats baseball program for 28 seasons, from 1988 through 2015. He is the winningest coach in Northwestern's program history, with over 600 wins. At Northwestern, Stevens has had 67 players drafted by Major League Baseball teams or signed to professional contracts. Stevens coached 94 All-Big Ten players, including four-time World Series champion Joe Girardi, two-time Major League Baseball All-Star Mark Loretta, and Toronto Blue Jays' J.A. Happ. Stevens announced his retirement partway through the 2015 season and stepped down at the end of the year.

Stevens played for two seasons at South Alabama before transferring to Lewis. He earned a Silver Medal with the U.S. team at the 1975 Pan American Games. He was drafted by the Kansas City Royals and played for three seasons in the Royals organization. Stevens then served as a scout for the New York Mets before becoming an assistant at Northwestern in 1985. After three years, he was promoted to head coach. Under Stevens, the Wildcats had three 30-win seasons. Stevens coached more games than any other coach in Northwestern history, over 500 more than second-place George McKinnon. He was named Big Ten Coach of the Year in 1991, 1995, and 2006

== Head coaching record ==
The following lists Stevens' record as a head coach.

Record table
Season	Team	Overall	Conference	Standing	Postseason
Northwestern (Big Ten Conference) (1988–2015)
1988	Northwestern	28–28	11–17	t-8th	
1989	Northwestern	26–30–3	15–13	6th	
1990	Northwestern	24–32	6–21	10th	
1991	Northwestern	27–28–1	15–12–1	T-3rd	Big Ten Tournament (Note: The top 4 of the Big Ten's 10 teams qualified for the tournament in 1991.)
1992	Northwestern	18–38	8–20	10th	
1993	Northwestern	27–27	15–13	5th	
1994	Northwestern	34–22	10–18	9th	
1995	Northwestern	36–19	15–13	T-3rd	Big Ten Tournament (Note: The top 4 of the Big Ten's 10 teams qualified for the tournament in 1995.)
1996	Northwestern	26–29	10–18	8th	
1997	Northwestern	20–35	9–19	9th	
1998	Northwestern	27–26	10–18	8th	
1999	Northwestern	24–29	10–18	9th	
2000	Northwestern	30–27	13–15	6th	Big Ten Tournament (Note: The top 6 of the Big Ten's 10 teams qualified for the tournament in 2000.)
2001	Northwestern	24–32	11–17	7th	
2002	Northwestern	26–29	14–15	6th	Big Ten Tournament (Note: The top 6 of the Big Ten's 10 teams qualified for the tournament in 2002.)
2003	Northwestern	25–25	15–14	5th	Big Ten Tournament (Note: The top 6 of the Big Ten's 10 teams qualified for the tournament in 2003.)
2004	Northwestern	26–28–1	14–18	7th	
2005	Northwestern	26–28	14–18	7th	
2006	Northwestern	26–33	21–11	2nd	Big Ten Tournament (Note: The top 6 of the Big Ten's 10 teams qualified for the tournament in 2006.)
2007	Northwestern	18–36	9–23	9th	
2008	Northwestern	21–28	14–18	7th	
2009	Northwestern	15–34–1	5–17	9th	
2010	Northwestern	24–32	13–11	t-3rd	Big Ten Tournament (Note: The top 6 of the Big Ten's 10 teams qualified for the tournament in 2010.)
2011	Northwestern	20–29	10–13	8th	
2012	Northwestern	18–36	6–18	11th	
2013	Northwestern	22–26	9–15	9th	
2014	Northwestern	19–33	7–16	9th	
2015	Northwestern	18–36	8–16	10th	
Northwestern:		674–836–6	317–455–1		
Total:		674–836–6			
National champion Postseason invitational champion Conference regular season champion Conference regular season and conference tournament champion Division regular season champion Division regular season and conference tournament champion Conference tournament champion
