= List of Michigan Wolverines head baseball coaches =

The Michigan Wolverines baseball program is a college baseball team that represents the University of Michigan in the Big Ten Conference of the National Collegiate Athletic Association. The team has had nineteen head coaches since organized baseball began in 1891. The current head coach is Tracy Smith who was hired in 2022.

In those seasons, ten coaches have won conference championships with the Wolverines, four coaches have won conference tournament championships, and two coaches have won national championships: Ray Fisher and Don Lund. Fisher is the all-time leader in games coached (940), wins (636) and years coached (38). Bud Middaugh is the all-time leader in postseason appearances (9) and wins (25). Sport McAllister is the overall leader in winning percentage, while Chris Harrison has the lowest winning percentage.

== Key ==
General
#	Number of coaches (Note: A running total of the number of coaches of the Michigan Wolverines. Thus, any coach who has two or more separate terms as head coach is counted only once.)
GC	Games coached
†	Elected to the National College Baseball Hall of Fame

Overall
OW	Wins
OL	Losses
OT	Ties
O%	Winning percentage

Conference
CW	Wins
CL	Losses
CT	Ties
C%	Winning percentage

Postseason (Note: Postseason play involving the NCAA Division I Baseball Championship.)
PA	Total Appearances (Note: Postseason appearances include seasons with NCAA Division I Baseball Championship bids since the tournament began in 1947.)
PW	Total Wins
PL	Total Losses
WA	College World Series appearances (Note: College World Series appearances include seasons with CWS bids since the tournament began in 1947.)
WW	College World Series wins
WL	College World Series losses

Championships
CC	Conference regular season
CT	Conference tournament (Note: The Big Ten Conference began a baseball tournament in 1981.)
NC	National championship

== Coaches ==
List of head baseball coaches showing season(s) coached, overall records, conference records, postseason records, championships and selected awards*Statistics correct as of the end of the 2019 NCAA Division I baseball season
#	Name	Term (Note: Michigan did not sponsor a baseball team in 1917.)	GC	OW	OL	OT	O%	CW	CL	CT	C%	PA	PW	PL	WA	WW	WL	CCs	CTs	NCs	Awards (Note: National and conference coach of the year awards.)
1	Pete Conway	1891–1892	32	22	9	1	.703	—	—	—	—	—	—	—	—	—	—	—	—	—	—
2	No coach	1893–1895	60	44	15	1	.742	—	—	—	—	—	—	—	—	—	—	—	—	—	—
3	Frank Sexton	1896, 1901–1902	61	38	22	1	.631	15	12	0	.556	—	—	—	—	—	—	1	—	—	—
4	Charles F. Watkins	1897–1898, 1900	34	16	17	1	.485	8	11	0	.421	—	—	—	—	—	—	0	—	—	—
5	Henry Clarke	1898–1899	19	14	5	0	.737	5	2	0	.714	—	—	—	—	—	—	1	—	—	—
6	Skel Roach	1903	17	12	5	0	.706	7	3	0	.700	—	—	—	—	—	—	0	—	—	—
7	Jerome Utley	1904	15	10	5	0	.667	4	5	0	.444	—	—	—	—	—	—	0	—	—	—
8	Sport McAllister	1905–1906, 1908–1909	76	58	17	1	.770	14	6	0	.700	—	—	—	—	—	—	1	—	—	—
9	Bobby Lowe	1907	16	11	4	1	.719	—	—	—	—	—	—	—	—	—	—	—	—	—	—
10	Branch Rickey †	1910–1913	104	68	32	4	.673	—	—	—	—	—	—	—	—	—	—	—	—	—	—
11	Carl Lundgren	1914–1920	142	93	43	6	.676	27	2	0	.931	—	—	—	—	—	—	3	—	—	—
12	Ray Fisher	1921–1958	940	636	295	9	.681	283	135	0	.575	1	4	1	1	4	1	15	—	1	—
13	Don Lund	1959–1962	136	80	53	3	.599	34	19	0	.642	2	10	4	1	4	1	1	—	1	—
14	Moby Benedict	1963–1979	624	367	252	5	.592	168	80	0	.677	4	12	7	1	1	2	3	—	—	—
15	Bud Middaugh	1980–1989	612	465	146	1	.761	142	38	0	.789	9	25	19	4	3	8	10	5	—	—
16	Bill Freehan	1990–1995	334	166	167	1	.499	76	89	0	.461	—	—	—	—	—	—	0	0	—	—
17	Geoff Zahn	1996–2001	334	163	169	2	.491	78	80	0	.494	1	2	2	—	—	—	1	1	—	Big Ten (1997)
18	Chris Harrison	2002	53	21	32	0	.396	14	17	0	.452	—	—	—	—	—	—	0	0	—	—
19	Rich Maloney	2003–2012	585	341	244	0	.583	160	117	0	.578	4	6	9	—	—	—	3	2	—	Big Ten (2007, 2008)
20	Erik Bakich	2013–2022	545	328	216	1	.603	140	93	0	.601	5	13	12	1	4	2	0	2	—	NCBWA (2019)
21	Tracy Smith	2023–present	0	0	0	0	–	0	0	0	–	—	—	—	—	—	—	—	—	—	—
