= Tom Smith (baseball coach, born 1942) =

American baseball coach and player

Biographical details
- Born: December 9, 1942 (age 83); Coldwater, Michigan, U.S.
- Education: Michigan State University

Playing career
- 1962: Dublin Braves
- Position: Catcher

Coaching career (HC unless noted)
- 1964–1982: Michigan State (asst.)
- 1983–1995: Michigan State

Head coaching record
- Overall: 377–332–2
- Tournaments: B1G: 4–10

Accomplishments and honors

Awards
- 2× Big Ten Coach of the Year (1988, 1992)

Thomas Woodrow Smith (born December 9, 1942) is a former American college baseball coach and catcher. He played professional baseball in 1962, before retiring due to injury. He was the head baseball coach at Michigan State University from 1983 to 1995.

== Playing career ==
Smith attended Coldwater High School in Coldwater, Michigan, where he played baseball, basketball and football. On August 17, 1961, it was reported that Smith had signed a professional baseball contract with the Milwaukee Braves. Smith began his professional career with the Dublin Braves of the Georgia–Florida League, where he hit .243 with 3 home runs and 35 RBIs. Following an injury plagued 1963 season, Smith turned down a contract from the Los Angeles Angels and retired from professional baseball.

== Coaching career ==
Smith worked as a student assistant under Danny Litwhiler until he completed his degree. In 1967, he worked as the freshman coach as well as an assistant with the varsity. On March 12, 1982, Smith was promoted to head coach after Litwhiler announced his retirement.

== Head coaching record ==
Record table
Season	Team	Overall	Conference	Standing	Postseason
Michigan State Spartans (Big Ten Conference) (1983–1995)
1983	Michigan State	22–32	8–6	2nd (East)	Big Ten Tournament
1984	Michigan State	32–26	8–9	2nd (East)	Big Ten Tournament
1985	Michigan State	22–35	2–14	5th (East)	
1986	Michigan State	28–26–1	7–9	T-3rd (East)	
1987	Michigan State	34–20	6–10	4th (East)	
1988	Michigan State	41–20	16–12	3rd	Big Ten Tournament
1989	Michigan State	25–26	13–15	7th	
1990	Michigan State	28–24	13–15	7th	
1991	Michigan State	28–25–1	12–16	8th	
1992	Michigan State	36–19	17–11	3rd	Big Ten Tournament
1993	Michigan State	31–23	12–16	T-8th	
1994	Michigan State	26–29	13–15	T-3rd	Big Ten Tournament
1995	Michigan State	24–27	12–16	T-8th	
Michigan State:		377–332–2	139–164		
Total:		377–332–2			
National champion Postseason invitational champion Conference regular season champion Conference regular season and conference tournament champion Division regular season champion Division regular season and conference tournament champion Conference tournament champion
