= 2026 Michigan State Spartans baseball team =

College baseball team season

2026 Michigan State Spartans baseball
- Conference: Big Ten Conference
- Record: 24–32 (11–19 Big Ten)
- Head coach: Jake Boss (18th season)
- Assistant coaches: Graham Sikes (17th season); Andrew Stone (5th season)
- Pitching coach: Mark Van Ameyde (9th season)
- Home stadium: Drayton McLane Baseball Stadium

2026 Big Ten Conference baseball standings
	Conf.						Overall
Team	W		L		T	PCT	W		L		T	PCT
No. 1 UCLA ‍†‍‡‍^{y}	28	–	2	–	0	.933	48	–	6	–	0	.889
No. 20 Nebraska ‍‍‍^{y}	23	–	7	–	0	.767	41	–	14	–	0	.745
No. 15 Oregon ‍‍‍^{y}	20	–	10	–	0	.667	38	–	15	–	0	.717
USC ‍‍‍^{y}	20	–	10	–	0	.667	42	–	14	–	0	.750
Purdue ‍‍‍	18	–	13	–	0	.581	36	–	18	–	0	.667
Ohio State ‍‍‍	18	–	12	–	0	.600	29	–	24	–	0	.547
Michigan ‍‍‍	17	–	13	–	0	.567	33	–	22	–	0	.600
Iowa ‍‍‍	15	–	15	–	0	.500	30	–	21	–	0	.588
Illinois ‍‍‍	14	–	16	–	0	.467	27	–	27	–	0	.500
Rutgers ‍‍‍	13	–	17	–	0	.433	26	–	29	–	0	.473
Washington ‍‍‍	12	–	18	–	0	.400	23	–	31	–	0	.426
Michigan State ‍‍‍	12	–	19	–	0	.387	22	–	31	–	0	.415
Minnesota ‍‍‍	11	–	19	–	0	.367	30	–	23	–	0	.566
Maryland ‍‍‍	9	–	21	–	0	.300	27	–	29	–	0	.482
Indiana ‍‍‍	9	–	21	–	0	.300	23	–	31	–	0	.426
Penn State ‍‍‍	9	–	21	–	0	.300	16	–	35	–	0	.314
Northwestern ‍‍‍	8	–	22	–	0	.267	21	–	30	–	1	.413
† – Conference champion ‡ – Tournament champion y – Invited to the NCAA tournament As of May 19, 2026; Rankings from D1Baseball

The 2026 Michigan State Spartans baseball team represents Michigan State University in the 2026 NCAA Division I baseball season. The Spartans are led by head coach Jake Boss in his eighteenth season. The Spartans are members of the Big Ten Conference (B1G) and play their home game at Drayton McLane Baseball Stadium in East Lansing, Michigan.

== Previous season ==
The Spartans finished the 2025 season 28-27 overall, including 13-17 in concernece play, finishing in 12th place in their conference. They qualified for the 2026 Big Ten baseball tournament as a 12th seed in Pool A were they would lose to 8th seed Nebraska in 10 innings and 1st seed Oregon.

== Roster ==
2026 Michigan State Baseball Roster
Pitchers	Catchers First basemen Infielders	Outfielders

=== Coaching staff ===
2026 Michigan State Baseball Coaching Staff
Name	Position	Seasons at Michigan State
Jake Boss	Head coach	18
Graham Sikes	Recruiting Coordinator	17
Mark Van Ameyde	Pitching Coach	9
Andrew Stone	Hitting Coach and Recruiting Coordinator	5
Adam Eaton	Director of Player Development	4
Tommy Merlo	Director of Baseball Operations	3

== Personnel ==
=== Starters ===
Opening Night Lineup
Pos.	No.	Player.	Year
--	--	--	--
--	--	--	--
--	--	--	--
--	--	--	--
--	--	--	--
--	--	--	--
--	--	--	--
--	--	--	--
--	--	--	--

Weekend pitching rotation
Day	No.	Player.	Year
Friday	--	--	--
Saturday	--	--	--
Sunday	--	--	--

== Schedule and results ==
2026 Michigan State Spartans baseball game log (Overall: 24–32; Conference: 11–19); (Home: 11–12; Away: 10–14; Neutral: 3–5)
Regular season (22–31)
February (3–5)
(Home; 0–0; Away: 2–4; Neutral: 1-1)

Date	Time (EST)	Opponent	Rank	TV	Venue	Score	Win	Loss	Save	Attendance	Overall record	B1G record
February 13	2:00 p.m.	at No. 8 Louisville*		ACCNX	Jim Patterson Stadium • Louisville, Kentucky	**W 4-3**	**Nolan Higgins (1-0)**	Casen Murphy (0-1)	**Tommy Szczepanski (1)**	1,744	1-0	—
February 14	1:00 p.m.	at No. 8 Louisville*		ACCNX	Jim Patterson Stadium • Louisville, Kentucky	**W 13-4**	**Brady Chambers (1-0)**	Jake Bean (0-1)	None	1,494	2-0	—
February 15	1:00 p.m.	at No. 8 Louisville*		ACCNX	Jim Patterson Stadium • Louisville, Kentucky	**L 1-9**	Wyatt Danilowicz (1-0)	**Logan Pikur (0-1)**	None	546	2-1	—
February 20	7:30 p.m.	at No. 3 Texas*		SEC+	UFCU Disch-Falk Field • Austin, Texas	**L 1-8**	Ruger Riojas (2-0)	**Aidan Donovan (0-1)**	None	7,808	2-2	—
February 21	3:00 p.m.	at No. 3 Texas*		SEC+	UFCU Disch-Falk Field • Austin, Texas	**L 1-3**	Max Grubbs (1-0)	**Carter Monke (0-1)**	Thomas Burns (1)	7,397	2-3	—
February 22	1:00 p.m.	at No. 3 Texas*		SEC+	UFCU Disch-Falk Field • Austin, Texas	**L 0-4**	Dylan Volantis (2-0)	**Logan Pikur (0-2)**	None	6,870	2-4	—
2026 First Pitch Invitational
February 27	2:00 p.m.	Illinois *		TBD	Fluor Field • Greenville, South Carolina	**L 4-5**(10)	Kyle Remington (2-0)	**Tommy Szczepanski (0-1)**	None	227	2-5	—
February 28	6:00 p.m.	Albany*		TBD	Fluor Field • Greenville, South Carolina	**W 4-1**	**Carter Monke (1-1)**	Christian Mello (0-1)	**Brady Chambers (1)**	235	3-5	—

March (6–12)
(Home; 3–3; Away: 3–6; Netural: 0-3)

Date	Time	Opponent	Rank	TV	Venue	Score	Win	Loss	Save	Attendance	Overall record	B1G record
March 1	2:00 p.m.	James Madison*		TBD	Fluor Field • Greenville, South Carolina	**L 2-4**	Adam Horvath (1-0)	**Gannon Grundman (0-1)**	Luke Mcgrath (2)	478	3-6	—
March 3	6:00 p.m.	Winthrop*		TBD	Fluor Field • Greenville, South Carolina	**L 2-5**	Colby Mcneely (2-0)	**Nolan Higgins (1-1)**	Brodt Walker (1)'	1,446	3-7	—
March 4	6:00 p.m.	No. 10 Clemson		TBD	Fluor FIeld • Greenville, South Carolina	**L 1-12**(7)	Eston Simpson (3-0)	**Gannon Grundman (0-2)**	None	3,204	3-8	—
March 6	3:00 p.m.	at Nebraksa		BTN+	Haymarket Park • Lincoln, Nebraska						3-9	0-1
March 7	2:00 p.m.	at Nebraska		BTN+	Haymarket Park • Lincoln, Nebraska						3-10	0-2
March 8	1:00 p.m.	at Nebraska		BTN+	Heymarket Park • Lincoln, Nebraska						3-11	0-3
March 10	4:00 p.m.	at Eastern Michigan*		TBD	Oestrike Stadium • Ypsilanti, Michigan						4-11	—
March 13	4:00 p.m.	at Rutgers		BTN+	Bainton Field • Piscataway, New Jersey						4-12	0-4
March 14	2:00 p.m.	at Rutgers		BTN+	Bainton Field • Piscataway, New Jersey						5-12	1-4
March 15	1:00 p.m.	at Rutgers		BTN+	Dainton Field • Piscataway, New Jersey						5-13	1-5
March 18	4:00 p.m.	at Michigan*		TBD	Ray Fisher Stadium • Ann Arbor, Michigan						5-14	—
March 20	3:30 p.m.	vs Iowa		BTN+	Jeff Ishbia Field at McLane Stadium • East Lansing, Michigan						6-14	2-5
March 21; DH (Game 1)	1:00 p.m.	vs Iowa		BTN+	Jeff Ishbia Field at McLane Stadium • East Lansing, Michigan						7-14	3-5
March 21; DH (Game 2)	4:30 p.m.	vs Iowa		BTN+	Jeff Ishbia Field at McLane Stadium • East Lansing, Michigan						7-15	3-6
March 24	3:00 p.m.	at Central Michigan*		TBD	Theunissen Stadium • Mount Pleasant, Michigan						6-15	—
March 27	3:30 p.m.	vs Prudue		BTN+	Jeff Ishbia Field at McLane Stadium • East Lansing, Michigan						7-15	4-6
March 28	3:30 p.m.	vs Prudue		BTN+	Jeff Ishbia Field at McLane Stadium • East Lansing, Michigan						7-16	4-7
March 29	1:00 p.m.	vs Prudue		BTN+	Jeff Ishbia Field at McLane Stadium • East Lansing, Michigan						7-17	4-8
March 31	4:00 p.m.	vs Central Michigan*		BTN+	Jeff Ishbia Field at McLane Stadium • East Lansing, Michigan	**Canceled (Inclement Weather)**					7-17	—

April (7–8)
(Home; 3–5; Away: 4–3)

Date	Time	Opponent	Rank	TV	Venue	Score	Win	Loss	Save	Attendance	Overall record	B1G record
April 1	6:00 p.m.	vs Lansing Lugnuts*		TBD	Jackson Field • Lansing, Michigan						—	—
April 3	4:00 p.m.	at Northwestern		BTN+	Rocky Miller Park • Evanston, Illinois						—	—
April 4	2:00 p.m.	at Northwestern		BTN+	Rocky Miller Park • Evanston, Illinois						—	—
April 5	2:00 p.m.	at Northwestern		BTN+	Rocky Miller Park • Evanston, Illinois						—	—
April 8	5:00 p.m.	at Notre Dame		ACCN	Frank Eck Stadium • South Bend, Indiana						—	—
April 10	6:00 p.m.	vs Michigan		BTN+	Jeff Ishbia Field at McLane Stadium • East Lansing, Michigan						—	—
April 11	3:30 p.m.	vs Michigan		BTN+	Jeff Ishbia Field at McLane Stadium • East Lansing, Michigan						—	—
April 12	1:00 p.m.	vs Michigan		BTN+	Jeff Ishbia Field at McLane Stadium • East Lansing, Michigan						—	—
April 14	6:00 p.m.	vs Oakland*		BTN+	Jeff Ishbia Field at McLane Stadium • East Lansing, Michigan						—	—
April 15	6:00 p.m.	at Western Michigan*		BTN+	LMCU Ballpark • Comstock Park, Michigan	**Canceled**					—	—
April 17	10:00 p.m.	at Washington		BTN+	Husky Ballpark • Seattle, Washington						—	—
April 18	10:00 p.m.	at Washington		BTN+	Husky Ballpark • Seattle, Washington						—	—
April 19	4:00 p.m.	at Washington		BTN+	Husky Ballpark • Seattle, Washington						—	—
April 22	6:00 p.m.	vs Notre Dame*		BTN	Jeff Ishbia Field at McLane Stadium • East Lansing, Michigan						—	—
April 25	6:00 p.m.	vs Maryland		BTN+	Jeff Ishbia Field at McLane Stadium • East Lansing, Michigan						—	—
April 26	3:30 p.m.	vs Maryland		BTN+	Jeff Ishbia Field at McLane Stadium • East Lansing, Michigan						—	—
April 27	1:00 p.m.	vs Maryland		BTN+	Jeff Ishbia Field at McLane Stadium • East Lansing, Michigan						—	—

May (6–6)
(Home: 5–4; Away: 1–2)

Date	Time	Opponent	Rank	TV	Venue	Score	Win	Loss	Save	Attendance	Overall record	B1G record
May 1	6:00 p.m.	vs No. 1 UCLA		BTN+	Jeff Ishbia Field at McLane Stadium • East Lansing, Michigan						—	—
May 2	3:30 p.m.	vs No. 1 UCLA		BTN+	Jeff Ishbia Field at McLane Stadium • East Lansing, Michigan						—	—
May 3	12:00 p.m.	vs No. 1 UCLA		BTN+	Jeff Ishbia Field at McLane Stadium • East Lansing, Michigan						—	—
May 5	6:00 p.m.	vs Bowling Green*		BTN+	Jeff Ishbia Field at McLane Stadium • East Lansing, Michigan						—	—
May 6	6:00 p.m.	vs Western Michigan*		BTN+	Jeff Ishbia Field at McLane Stadium • East Lansing, Michigan						—	—
May 8	6:00 p.m.	Ohio State		BTN+	Huntington Park • Columbus, Ohio						—	—
May 9	3:00 p.m.	at Ohio State		BTN+	Bill Davis Stadium • Columbus, Ohio						—	—
May 10	1:00 p.m.	at Ohio State		BTN+	Bill Davis Stadium • Columbus, Ohio						—	—
May 12	1:00 p.m.	vs Eastern Michigan*		BTN+	Jeff Ishbia Field at McLane Stadium • East Lansing, Michigan						—	—
May 14	6:00 p.m.	vs Illinois State*		BTN+	Jeff Ishbia Field at McLane Stadium • East Lansing, Michigan						—	—
May 15	6:00 p.m.	vs Illinois State*		BTN+	Jeff Ishbia Field at McLane Stadium • East Lansing, Michigan						—	—
May 16	1:00 p.m.	vs Illinois State*		BTN+	Jeff Ishbia Field at McLane Stadium • East Lansing, Michigan						—	—

Postseason (2–1)
Big Ten Tournament (2–1)

Date	Time	Opponent	Rank	TV	Venue	Score	Win	Loss	Save	Attendance	Overall record	Tournament record
May 19	10:00 a.m.	(5) Purdue (Double Elimination Opening Round Winner's Bracket)	(12)	BTN	Charles Schwab Field Omaha • Omaha, Nebraska	**W 8-4**	**Aidan Donovan (6-3)**	Cole Van Assen (6-5)	None	None	23-31	1-0
May 20	6:00 p.m.	(8) Iowa (Double Elimination Qialification Round Winner's Bracket)	(12)	BTN	Charles Schwab Field Omaha • Omaha, Nebraska	**W 4-3**	**Gannon Grundman (2-3)**	Kyle Alivo (3-3)	**Nolan Higgins (4)**	None	24-31	2-0
May 22	10:00 a.m.	(4) No. 25 USC (Quarterfinals)	(12)	BTN	Charles Schwab Field Omaha • Omaha, Nebraska	**L 0-7**	Andrew Johnson (7-2)	**J.D. Greeley (0-4)**	None	None	24–32	2–1

NCAA Tournament (0–0)

Date	Time	Opponent	Rank	TV	Venue	Score	Win	Loss	Save	Attendance	Overall record	NCAAT record

"#" represents ranking. All rankings from D1 Baseball Poll on the date of the contest.
"()" represents postseason seeding in the Big Ten Tournament or NCAA Regional, respectively.
= Win, = Loss, = Canceled/Postponed
Bold = **Michigan State Spartans team member**
* = Non-Conference Game
Schedule Source:
