= 2004 Big Ten baseball tournament =

2004 Big Ten Conference baseball tournament
- Teams: 6
- Format: Double-elimination
- Finals site: Siebert Field; Minneapolis, MN
- Champions: Minnesota (8th title)
- Winning coach: John Anderson (8th title)
- MVP: Glen Perkins (Minnesota)

2004 Big Ten Conference baseball standings
	Conf.				Overall
Team	W		L	PCT	W		L	PCT
Minnesota ‍†‍‡‍^{y}	21	–	21	.500	38	–	23	.623
Ohio State ‍‍‍	19	–	12	.613	36	–	25	.590
Michigan ‍‍‍	19	–	13	.594	34	–	26	.567
Michigan State ‍‍‍	19	–	13	.594	33	–	26	.559
Purdue ‍‍‍	17	–	14	.548	29	–	28	.509
Penn State ‍‍‍	17	–	15	.531	28	–	29	.491
Northwestern ‍‍‍	14	–	18	.438	26	–	28	.481
Iowa ‍‍‍	12	–	20	.375	20	–	35	.364
Illinois ‍‍‍	11	–	21	.344	22	–	33	.400
Indiana ‍‍‍	9	–	22	.290	25	–	30	.455
x – Division champion ‡ – Tournament champion y – Invited to the NCAA tournament As of June 30, 2004; Rankings from Collegiate Baseball

The 2004 Big Ten Conference baseball tournament was held at Siebert Field on the campus of the University of Minnesota in Minneapolis, Minnesota, from May 15 through 19. The top six teams from the regular season participated in the double-elimination tournament, the twenty third annual tournament sponsored by the Big Ten Conference to determine the league champion. Minnesota won their eighth tournament championship and earned the Big Ten Conference's automatic bid to the 2004 NCAA Division I baseball tournament.

== Format and seeding ==
The 2004 tournament was a 6-team double-elimination tournament, with seeds determined by conference regular season winning percentage only. Michigan claimed the third seed over Michigan State by tiebreaker. As in the previous two years, the top two seeds received a single bye, with the four lower seeds playing opening round games. The top seed played the lowest seeded winner from the opening round, with the second seed playing the higher seed. Teams that lost in the opening round played an elimination game.

Team	W	L	PCT	GB	Seed
Minnesota	21	10	.677	–	1
Ohio State	19	12	.613	2	2
Michigan	19	13	.594	2.5	3
Michigan State	19	13	.594	2.5	4
Purdue	17	14	.548	4	5
Penn State	17	15	.531	4.5	6
Northwestern	14	18	.438	7.5	–
Iowa	12	20	.375	9.5	–
Illinois	11	21	.344	10.5	–
Indiana	9	22	.290	12	–

== Tournament ==
Upper round 1	Upper round 2	Upper final	Final
1	Minnesota	6
3	Michigan	7	5	Purdue	1
6	Penn State	2	1	Minnesota	16
3	Michigan	3
2	Ohio State	4
4	Michigan State	5	3	Michigan	10
5	Purdue	6
1	Minnesota	2	7
2	Ohio State	3	3
Lower round 1	Lower round 2	Lower round 3	Lower final
3	Michigan	2
5	Purdue	4	2	Ohio State	14
2	Ohio State	8	2	Ohio State	6
6	Penn State	7	4	Michigan State	3
4	Michigan State	8

== All-Tournament Team ==
The following players were named to the All-Tournament Team.

Pos	Name	School
P	Glen Perkins	Minnesota
P	Jay Gagner	Minnesota
P	Jeffrey Carroll	Ohio State
C	Derek Kinnear	Ohio State
1B	Andy Hunter	Minnesota
2B	Chris Getz	Michigan
SS	Matt Fornasiere	Minnesota
3B	Ronnie Bourquin	Ohio State
OF	Ryan Basham	Michigan State
OF	Steve Carvatti	Ohio State
OF	Jacob Howell	Ohio State
DH	Brandon Roberts	Michigan

=== Most Outstanding Player ===
Glen Perkins was named Most Outstanding Player. Perkins was a pitcher for Minnesota.
