= Ike Irish =

American baseball player (born 2003)

Baltimore Orioles
- Catcher / Outfielder / First baseman
- Born: November 26, 2003 (age 22); Grand Rapids, Michigan, U.S.
- Bats: Left Throws: Right
- Stats at Baseball Reference

Isaac William Irish (born November 26, 2003) is an American professional baseball catcher, outfielder, and first baseman in the Baltimore Orioles organization. He played college baseball for the Auburn Tigers of Auburn University before the Orioles selected him in the first round of the 2025 Major League Baseball draft.

== Career ==
=== Amateur ===
Irish attended Hudsonville High School in Hudsonville, Michigan, for one year, and St. Mary's Preparatory in Orchard Lake Village, Michigan, where he played on the school's baseball team for two seasons. He opted out of the MLB draft out of high school to fulfill his commitment to Auburn University. In 2023, he played collegiate summer baseball with the Brewster Whitecaps of the Cape Cod Baseball League, was named a league all-star, and returned to the league in 2024 with the Chatham Anglers. In 2025, his junior year at Auburn, Irish played in 55 games and batted .364 with 19 home runs and 58 runs batted in (RBI).

=== Baltimore Orioles ===
Considered a top prospect for the 2025 MLB draft, the Baltimore Orioles selected Irish in the first round, with the 19th overall selection. He signed with the Orioles on July 18, receiving a $4,418,400 signing bonus. The Orioles assigned him to the Delmarva Shorebirds of the Class A Carolina League to make his professional debut. He played in 20 games and hit .230 with one home run.

To begin the 2026 season, Irish was assigned to the Frederick Keys of the High-A South Atlantic League. He went 4-for-7 with a pair of homers and six RBI in a 17–6 away win over the Greenville Drive on July 19. He played in 76 games for the Keys, hitting .286 with 16 home runs, 20 stolen bases, and .915 OPS before he was placed on the injured list after tearing the meniscus in his left knee sliding into second base.

== Personal life ==
His uncle, Jake Boss, is the coach of the Michigan State Spartans baseball team.
