= 1988 Big Ten baseball tournament =

League championship

1988 Big Ten Conference baseball tournament
- Teams: 4
- Format: Double-elimination
- Finals site: Ray Fisher Stadium; Ann Arbor, MI
- Champions: Minnesota (3rd title)
- Winning coach: John Anderson (3rd title)
- MVP: Vince Palyan (Minnesota)

1988 Big Ten Conference baseball standings
	Conf.				Overall
Team	W		L	PCT	W		L	PCT
No. 19 Michigan ‍†‍‍^{y}	20	–	8	.714	48	–	19	.716
Minnesota ‍‍‡‍^{y}	17	–	11	.607	38	–	28	.576
Michigan State ‍‍‍	16	–	12	.571	41	–	20	.672
Ohio State ‍‍‍	16	–	12	.571	32	–	28	.533
Wisconsin ‍‍‍	15	–	13	.536	28	–	27	.509
Iowa ‍‍‍	14	–	14	.500	29	–	25	.537
Illinois ‍‍‍	12	–	16	.429	26	–	20	.565
Indiana ‍‍‍	11	–	17	.393	39	–	29	.574
Northwestern ‍‍‍	11	–	17	.393	28	–	28	.500
Purdue ‍‍‍	8	–	20	.286	26	–	34	.433
x – Division champion ‡ – Tournament champion y – Invited to the NCAA tournament As of June 30, 1988; Rankings from Collegiate Baseball

The 1988 Big Ten Conference baseball tournament was held at Ray Fisher Stadium on the campus of the University of Michigan in Ann Arbor, Michigan, from May 19 through 21. The top four teams from the regular season participated in the double-elimination tournament, the eighth annual tournament sponsored by the Big Ten Conference to determine the league champion. Minnesota won their third tournament championship and earned the Big Ten Conference's automatic bid to the 1988 NCAA Division I baseball tournament.

== Format and seeding ==
The 1988 tournament was a 4-team double-elimination tournament, with seeds determined by conference regular season winning percentage only.

Team	W	L	PCT	GB	Seed
Michigan	20	8	.714	–	1
Minnesota	17	11	.607	3	2
Michigan State	16	12	.571	4	3
Ohio State	16	12	.571	4	4
Wisconsin	15	13	.536	5	–
Iowa	14	14	.500	6	–
Illinois	12	16	.429	8	–
Indiana	11	17	.393	6	–
Northwestern	11	17	.393	6	–
Purdue	8	20	.286	12	–

== Tournament ==
Upper round 1
1	Michigan	6
4	Ohio State	3
2	Minnesota	5
3	Michigan State	10
Lower round 1
4	Ohio State	2
2	Minnesota	6

Upper final
1	Michigan	1
3	Michigan State	4
Lower final
1	Michigan	2
3	Minnesota	4

Final
3	Michigan State	4	3
2	Minnesota	17	5

== All-Tournament Team ==
The following players were named to the All-Tournament Team.

Pos	Name	School
P	Todd Krumm	Michigan State
P	Jim Abbott	Michigan
C	Dan Wilson	Minnesota
1B	Paul Weinberg	Minnesota
2B	Scott Meadows	Ohio State
SS	Kevin Dalson	Michigan State
3B	Jeff Goergen	Minnesota
OF	Mike Davidson	Michigan State
OF	J. T. Bruett	Minnesota
OF	Vince Palyan	Minnesota

=== Most Outstanding Player ===
Vince Palyan was named Most Outstanding Player. Palyan was an outfielder for Minnesota.
