= 2000 Big Ten baseball tournament =

2000 Big Ten Conference baseball tournament
- Teams: 6
- Format: Double-elimination
- Finals site: Siebert Field; Minneapolis, MN
- Champions: Illinois (3rd title)
- Winning coach: Itch Jones (1st title)
- MVP: Jason Anderson (Illinois)

2000 Big Ten Conference baseball standings
	Conf.				Overall
Team	W		L	PCT	W		L	PCT
Minnesota ‍†‍‍^{y}	20	–	8	.714	38	–	22	.633
No. 19 Penn State ‍‍‍^{y}	18	–	9	.667	41	–	17	.707
Purdue ‍‍‍	17	–	11	.607	35	–	23	.603
Illinois ‍‍‡‍^{y}	17	–	11	.607	41	–	21	.661
Ohio State ‍‍‍	15	–	13	.536	37	–	23	.617
Northwestern ‍‍‍	13	–	15	.464	30	–	27	.526
Iowa ‍‍‍	11	–	17	.393	19	–	35	.352
Michigan ‍‍‍	10	–	18	.357	20	–	32	.385
Michigan State ‍‍‍	9	–	18	.333	20	–	36	.357
Indiana ‍‍‍	9	–	19	.321	29	–	27	.518
x – Division champion ‡ – Tournament champion y – Invited to the NCAA tournament As of June 30, 2000; Rankings from Collegiate Baseball

The 2000 Big Ten Conference baseball tournament was held at Siebert Field on the campus of University of Minnesota in Minneapolis, Minnesota, from May 15 through 19. The top six teams from the regular season participated in the double-elimination tournament, the nineteenth annual tournament sponsored by the Big Ten Conference to determine the league champion. Illinois won their third tournament championship and earned the Big Ten Conference's automatic bid to the 2000 NCAA Division I baseball tournament.

== Format and seeding ==
The 2000 tournament was a 6-team double-elimination tournament, with seeds determined by conference regular season winning percentage only. Purdue claimed the third seed over Illinois by tiebreaker. This was the first year of the expanded six team format, with all previous years being four team events.

Team	W	L	PCT	GB	Seed
Minnesota	20	8	.714	–	1
Penn State	18	9	.667	1.5	2
Purdue	17	11	.607	3	3
Illinois	17	11	.607	3	4
Ohio State	15	13	.536	5	5
Northwestern	13	15	.464	7	6
Iowa	11	17	.393	9	–
Michigan	10	18	.357	10	–
Michigan State	9	18	.333	10.5	–
Indiana	9	19	.321	11	–

== Tournament ==
First round
1	Minnesota	8
6	Northwestern	4
2	Penn State	8
5	Ohio State	7
3	Purdue	2
4	Illinois	6

Second round
1	Minnesota	1
3	Purdue	6
6	Northwestern	2
5	Ohio State	9
2	Penn State	3
4	Illinois	5
1	Minnesota	2
2	Penn State	5

Third round
3	Purdue	8
5	Ohio State	9
4	Illinois	0
2	Penn State	6

Semifinals
5	Ohio State	0
4	Illinois	4

Final
4	Illinois	5
2	Penn State	3

== All-Tournament Team ==
The following players were named to the All-Tournament Team.

Pos	Name	School
P	Jason Anderson	Illinois
P	David Gassner	Purdue
C	Chris Netwall	Penn State
1B	Nick Swisher	Ohio State
2B	Eric Spadt	Penn State
3B	Craig Marquie	Illinois
OF	Jason Turner	Ohio State
OF	Michael Campo	Penn State
OF	Nate Sickler	Purdue
DH	Luke Appert	Minnesota

=== Most Outstanding Player ===
Jason Anderson was named Most Outstanding Player. Anderson was a pitcher for Illinois.
