= Jake Boss =

American college baseball coach

Jake Boss Jr.
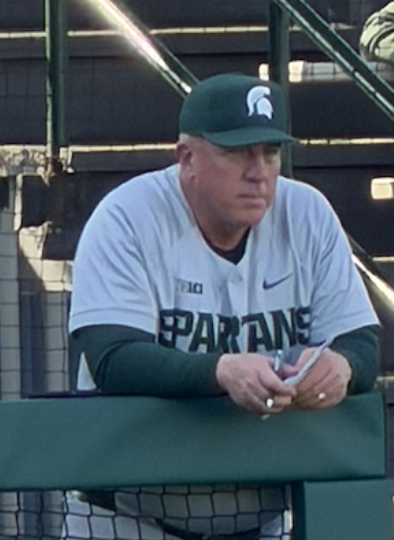
- Boss during a game at Oestrike Stadium in 2026

Current position
- Title: Head coach
- Team: Michigan State
- Conference: Big Ten
- Record: 470–412 (.533)

Biographical details
- Education: Alma College; Eastern Michigan University

Playing career
- 1990–1993: Alma

Coaching career (HC unless noted)
- 1994: St. Clair (MI) Lakeview (asst.)
- 1995: Webberville (MI)
- 1996–1997: Iowa Central CC (asst.)
- 1998–2004: Eastern Michigan (asst.)
- 2005–2007: Michigan (asst.)
- 2008: Eastern Michigan
- 2009–present: Michigan State

Head coaching record
- Overall: 517–474 (.522)
- Tournaments: B1G: 12–19 (.387); NCAA: 0–4 (.000)

Accomplishments and honors

Championships
- 1 MAC West Division Championship (2008); 1 MAC Tournament championship (2008); 1 Big Ten Regular season Championship (2011); 2 NCAA Regional Appearances (2008, 2012)

Jacob Boss Jr. is an American baseball coach and former player, who is the current head baseball coach of the Michigan State Spartans. He played college baseball at Alma College for head coach Bill Klenk from 1990 to 1993. He then served as the head coach of the Eastern Michigan Eagles in 2008.

== Early career ==
Boss played college baseball at Division III Alma College from 1990–1993. In the mid-1990s, Boss served as a high school and community college baseball coach before accepting an assistant coaching position at Eastern Michigan prior to the 1997 season. He left Eastern Michigan after the 2004 season to serve as an assistant at Michigan from 2005–2007.

== Head coaching career ==
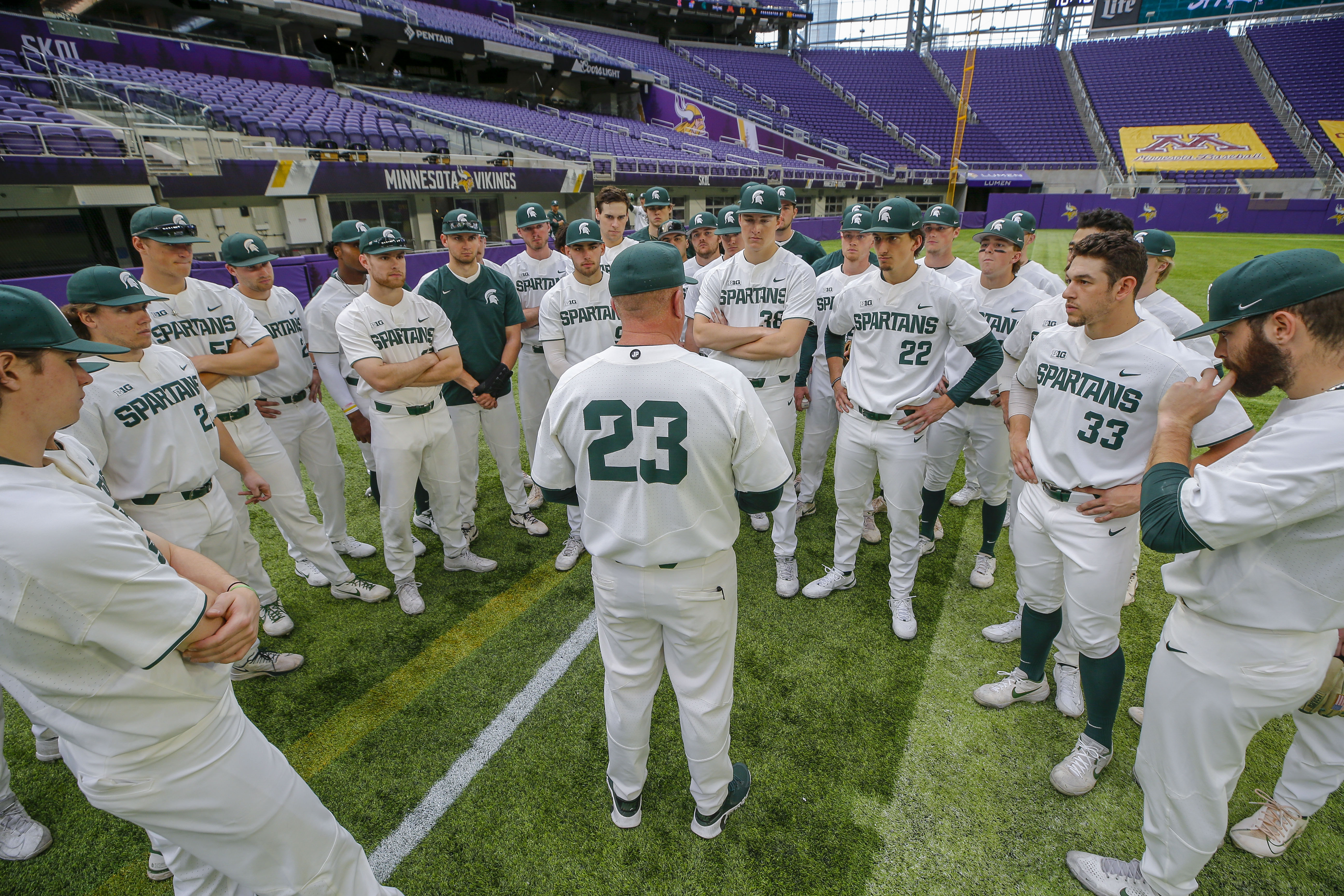
Michigan State Baseball during the 2022 Season

Boss was named the head coach at Eastern Michigan for the 2008 season and spent one year there. Under Boss, the team lost its first 17 games but went 25–17 for the remainder of the season. The Eagles won the Mid-American Conference (MAC) Western Division Title and the MAC tournament, thus qualifying for the NCAA tournament.

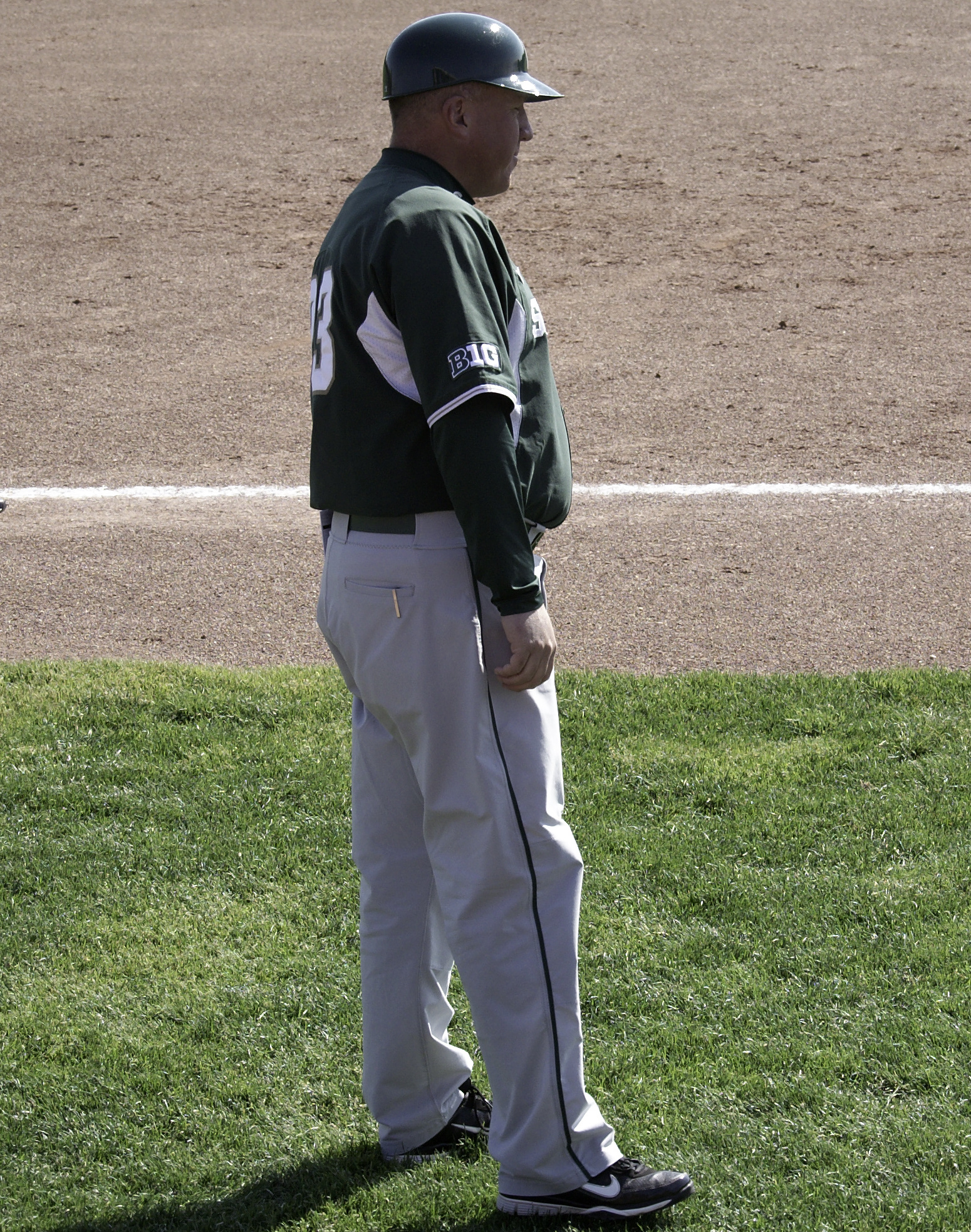
Boss in a game at Theunissen Stadium in 2012

On July 1, 2008, Boss was named head baseball coach at Michigan State. During his 14 seasons at Michigan State University, Coach Boss has achieved significant success. He holds a record of 383-332 (.536), making him the winningest coach in program history over a 14-year span. Under his leadership, the MSU baseball team has experienced five of the top 10 winningest seasons in program history. They have also achieved seven 30-win seasons in the last 12 years, won the Big Ten regular-season championship in 2011, and made his first NCAA tournament appearance with Michigan State in 2012.

== Head coaching record ==
Below is a table of Boss's yearly records as an NCAA head baseball coach.

Record table
| Season | Team | Overall | Conference | Standing | Postseason |
|---|---|---|---|---|---|
Eastern Michigan Eagles (Mid-American Conference) (2008)
| 2008 | Eastern Michigan | 25–34 | 15–8 (West) | 1st | NCAA Regional |
| Eastern Michigan: | | 25–34 | 15–8 | | |
Michigan State Spartans (Big Ten Conference) (2009–present)
| 2009 | Michigan State | 23–31 | 13–11 | 5th | Big Ten tournament |
| 2010 | Michigan State | 34–19 | 11–13 | T-7th | |
| 2011 | Michigan State | 36–21 | 15–9 | T-1st | Big Ten tournament |
| 2012 | Michigan State | 37–23 | 13–11 | 5th | NCAA Regional |
| 2013 | Michigan State | 33–17 | 12–9 | 7th | |
| 2014 | Michigan State | 31–26 | 11–13 | 6th | Big Ten tournament |
| 2015 | Michigan State | 34–23 | 14–10 | T-3rd | Big Ten tournament |
| 2016 | Michigan State | 36–20 | 13–11 | T-6th | Big Ten tournament |
| 2017 | Michigan State | 29–23 | 10–14 | 9th | |
| 2018 | Michigan State | 20–32 | 11–12 | 8th | Big Ten tournament |
| 2019 | Michigan State | 20–34 | 8–15 | 11th | |
| 2020 | Michigan State | 9–6 | 0–0 | | Season canceled due to COVID-19 |
| 2021 | Michigan State | 17–27 | 17–27 | 11th | |
| 2022 | Michigan State | 24–30 | 8–16 | 12th | |
| 2023 | Michigan State | 33–22 | 12–12 | 8th | Big Ten tournament |
| 2024 | Michigan State | 24–27 | 11–13 | T-9th | |
| 2025 | Michigan State | 28–27 | 13–17 | 12th | Big Ten tournament |
| 2026 | Michigan State | 24–32 | 11–19 | T-12th | Big Ten tournament |
| Michigan State: | | 492–440 (.528) | 203–232 (.467) | | |
| Total: | | 517–474 (.522) | | | |
National champion Postseason invitational champion Conference regular season champion Conference regular season and conference tournament champion Division regular season champion Division regular season and conference tournament champion Conference tournament champion

== Personal life ==
Boss has a nephew, Ike Irish, who plays in the Baltimore Orioles organization.

== See also ==
- List of current NCAA Division I baseball coaches
