= 1994 Big Ten baseball tournament =

1994 Big Ten Conference baseball tournament
- Teams: 4
- Format: Double-elimination
- Finals site: C. O. Brown Stadium; Battle Creek, MI
- Champions: Ohio State (2nd title)
- Winning coach: Bob Todd (2nd title)
- MVP: Mike Repasky (Ohio State)

1994 Big Ten Conference baseball standings
	Conf.				Overall
Team	W		L	PCT	W		L	PCT
No. 11 Ohio State ‍†‍‡‍^{y}	25	–	2	.926	49	–	9	.845
No. 28 Minnesota ‍‍‍^{y}	21	–	7	.750	42	–	21	.667
Michigan ‍‍‍	13	–	15	.464	29	–	29	.500
Michigan State ‍‍‍	13	–	15	.464	26	–	29	.473
Iowa ‍‍‍	13	–	15	.464	22	–	32	.407
Penn State ‍‍‍	12	–	15	.444	25	–	24	.510
Indiana ‍‍‍	12	–	16	.429	33	–	23	.589
Illinois ‍‍‍	12	–	16	.429	26	–	26	.500
Northwestern ‍‍‍	10	–	18	.357	34	–	22	.607
Purdue ‍‍‍	8	–	20	.286	16	–	39	.291
x – Division champion ‡ – Tournament champion y – Invited to the NCAA tournament As of June 30, 1994; Rankings from Collegiate Baseball

The 1994 Big Ten Conference baseball tournament was held at C. O. Brown Stadium in Battle Creek, Michigan, from May 15 through 19. The top four teams from the regular season participated in the double-elimination tournament, the fourteenth annual tournament sponsored by the Big Ten Conference to determine the league champion. Ohio State won their second tournament championship and earned the Big Ten Conference's automatic bid to the 1994 NCAA Division I baseball tournament.

== Format and seeding ==
The 1994 tournament was a 4-team double-elimination tournament, with seeds determined by conference regular season winning percentage only. Michigan and Michigan State claimed the third and fourth seeds, respectively, by tiebreakers.

Team	W	L	PCT	GB	Seed
Ohio State	25	2	.926	–	1
Minnesota	21	7	.750	4.5	2
Michigan	13	15	.464	12.5	3
Michigan State	13	15	.464	12.5	4
Iowa	13	15	.464	12.5	–
Penn State	12	15	.444	13	–
Indiana	12	16	.429	13.5	–
Illinois	12	16	.429	13.5	–
Northwestern	10	18	.357	15.5	–
Purdue	8	20	.286	17.5	–

== Tournament ==
Upper round 1
1	Ohio State	12
4	Michigan State	5
2	Minnesota	8
3	Michigan	1
Lower round 1
4	Michigan State	1
3	Michigan	5

Upper final
1	Ohio State	6
2	Minnesota	5
Lower final
2	Minnesota	2
3	Michigan	4

Final
1	Ohio State	3*	9
3	Michigan	4	7

* - Indicates game required 12 innings.

== All-Tournament Team ==
The following players were named to the All-Tournament Team.

Pos	Name	School
P	Ron Hollis	Michigan
P	Heath Murray	Michigan
1B	Jonathan Sweet	Ohio State
2B	Mark Merila	Minnesota
SS	Dave Veres	Michigan State
3B	Mike Estep	Ohio State
OF	Brian Simmons	Michigan
OF	Charlie Nelson	Minnesota
OF	Mike Repasky	Ohio State
DH	Scott Weaver	Michigan
DH	Brian Mannino	Ohio State

=== Most Outstanding Player ===
Mike Repasky was named Most Outstanding Player. Repasky was an outfielder for Ohio State.
