= 1995 Big Ten baseball tournament =

Baseball tournament

1995 Big Ten Conference baseball tournament
- Teams: 4
- Format: Double-elimination
- Finals site: Trautman Field; Columbus, OH
- Champions: Ohio State (3rd title)
- Winning coach: Bob Todd (3rd title)
- MVP: Shane Gunderson/Scott Kaczmar ( Minnesota/Ohio State)

1995 Big Ten Conference baseball standings
	Conf.				Overall
Team	W		L	PCT	W		L	PCT
No. 26 Ohio State ‍†‍‡‍^{y}	18	–	10	.643	40	–	23	.635
Minnesota ‍‍‍	16	–	12	.571	31	–	27	.534
Northwestern ‍‍‍	15	–	13	.536	36	–	19	.655
Purdue ‍‍‍	15	–	13	.536	28	–	29	.491
Penn State ‍‍‍	13	–	13	.500	25	–	29	.463
Illinois ‍‍‍	14	–	14	.500	25	–	31	.446
Iowa ‍‍‍	13	–	15	.464	29	–	24	.547
Indiana ‍‍‍	12	–	16	.429	33	–	23	.589
Michigan State ‍‍‍	12	–	16	.429	24	–	27	.471
Michigan ‍‍‍	10	–	16	.385	24	–	29	.453
x – Division champion ‡ – Tournament champion y – Invited to the NCAA tournament As of June 30, 1995; Rankings from Collegiate Baseball

The 1995 Big Ten Conference baseball tournament was held at Trautman Field on the campus of Ohio State University in Columbus, Ohio, from May 15 through 19. The top four teams from the regular season participated in the double-elimination tournament, the fifteenth annual tournament sponsored by the Big Ten Conference to determine the league champion. Ohio State won their third tournament championship and earned the Big Ten Conference's automatic bid to the 1995 NCAA Division I baseball tournament.

== Format and seeding ==
The 1995 tournament was a 4-team double-elimination tournament, with seeds determined by conference regular season winning percentage only.

Team	W	L	PCT	GB	Seed
Ohio State	18	10	.643	–	1
Minnesota	16	12	.571	2	2
Northwestern	15	13	.536	3	3
Purdue	15	13	.536	3	4
Penn State	13	13	.500	4	–
Illinois	14	14	.500	4	–
Iowa	13	15	.464	5	–
Indiana	12	16	.429	6	–
Michigan State	12	16	.429	6	–
Michigan	10	16	.385	8	–

== Tournament ==
Upper round 1
1	Ohio State	2
4	Purdue	3
2	Minnesota	9
3	Northwestern	8
Lower round 1
1	Ohio State	16
3	Northwestern	15

Upper final
4	Purdue	3
2	Minnesota	26
Lower final
4	Purdue	3
1	Ohio State	8

Final
1	Ohio State	19	11
2	Minnesota	13	6

== All-Tournament Team ==
The following players were named to the All-Tournament Team.

Pos	Name	School
P	Bob Spears	Ohio State
P	Mike Headman	Purdue
C	Shane Gunderson	Minnesota
1B	Rob Smith	Minnesota
2B	Mark Carek	Ohio State
SS	Chris Williams	Ohio State
3B	Mike Estep	Ohio State
OF	Wes Denning	Minnesota
OF	Shane McCarthy	Minnesota
OF	Scott Kaczmar	Ohio State
DH	Jake Suffian	Northwestern

=== Most Outstanding Player ===
Shane Gunderson and Scott Kaczmar were named co-Most Outstanding Player. Gunderson was a catcher for Minnesota, while Kaczmar was an outfielder for Ohio State.
