= 1992 Big Ten baseball tournament =

1992 Big Ten Conference baseball tournament
- Teams: 4
- Format: Double-elimination
- Finals site: Trautman Field; Columbus, OH
- Champions: Minnesota (4th title)
- Winning coach: John Anderson (4th title)
- MVP: Scott Bakkum (Minnesota)

1992 Big Ten Conference baseball standings
	Conf.				Overall
Team	W		L	PCT	W		L	PCT
No. 19 Ohio State ‍†‍‍^{y}	20	–	8	.714	40	–	21	.656
No. 25 Minnesota ‍‍‡‍^{y}	18	–	10	.643	42	–	21	.667
Michigan State ‍‍‍	17	–	11	.607	36	–	19	.655
Illinois ‍‍‍	16	–	12	.571	36	–	20	.643
Indiana ‍‍‍	14	–	14	.500	35	–	20	.636
Purdue ‍‍‍	13	–	15	.464	30	–	25	.545
Iowa ‍‍‍	12	–	16	.429	26	–	28	.481
Penn State ‍‍‍	11	–	17	.393	24	–	24	.500
Michigan ‍‍‍	11	–	17	.393	21	–	32	.396
Northwestern ‍‍‍	8	–	20	.286	18	–	38	.321
x – Division champion ‡ – Tournament champion y – Invited to the NCAA tournament As of June 30, 1992; Rankings from Collegiate Baseball

The 1992 Big Ten Conference baseball tournament was held at Trautman Field on the campus of Ohio State University in Columbus, Ohio, from May 15 through 19. The top four teams from the regular season participated in the double-elimination tournament, the twelfth annual tournament sponsored by the Big Ten Conference to determine the league champion. Minnesota won their fourth tournament championship and earned the Big Ten Conference's automatic bid to the 1992 NCAA Division I baseball tournament

== Format and seeding ==
The 1992 tournament was a 4-team double-elimination tournament, with seeds determined by conference regular season winning percentage only. Iowa claimed the second seed by tiebreaker over Illinois.

Team	W	L	PCT	GB	Seed
Ohio State	20	8	.714	–	1
Minnesota	18	10	.643	2	2
Michigan State	17	11	.607	3	3
Illinois	16	12	.571	4	4
Indiana	14	14	.500	6	–
Purdue	13	15	.464	7	–
Iowa	12	16	.429	8	–
Penn State	11	17	.393	9	–
Michigan	11	17	.393	9	–
Northwestern	8	20	.286	12	–

== Tournament ==
Upper round 1
1	Ohio State	5
4	Illinois	10
2	Minnesota	5
3	Michigan State	0
Lower round 1
1	Ohio State	5
3	Michigan State	10

Upper final
4	Illinois	3
2	Minnesota	4^{12}
Lower final
4	Illinois	2
3	Michigan State	4

Final
2	Minnesota	11
3	Michigan State	5

== All-Tournament Team ==
The following players were named to the All-Tournament Team.

Pos	Name	School
P	Keith Toriani	Illinois
P	Scott Bakkum	Minnesota
C	Darren Grass	Minnesota
1B	George Behr	Minnesota
SS	Andy Small	Illinois
3B	Alex Gagin	Michigan State
OF	Larry Sutton	Illinois
OF	Steve Money	Michigan State
OF	Keith Krenke	Minnesota
DH	Adam Sobocienski	Minnesota

=== Most Outstanding Player ===
Scott Bakkum was named Most Outstanding Player. Bakkum was a pitcher for Minnesota.
