= 2002 Big Ten baseball tournament =

2002 Big Ten Conference baseball tournament
- Teams: 6
- Format: Double-elimination
- Finals site: Siebert Field; Minneapolis, MN
- Champions: Ohio State (5th title)
- Winning coach: Bob Todd (5th title)
- MVP: Joe Wilkins (Ohio State)

2002 Big Ten Conference baseball standings
	Conf.				Overall
Team	W		L	PCT	W		L	PCT
Minnesota ‍†‍‍	18	–	10	.643	32	–	26	.552
Ohio State ‍‍‡‍^{y}	18	–	11	.621	38	–	20	.655
Michigan State ‍‍‍	16	–	12	.571	38	–	19	.667
Indiana ‍‍‍	15	–	14	.517	35	–	20	.636
Iowa ‍‍‍	15	–	16	.484	26	–	29	.473
Northwestern ‍‍‍	14	–	15	.483	26	–	29	.473
Illinois ‍‍‍	14	–	15	.483	32	–	19	.627
Michigan ‍‍‍	14	–	17	.452	21	–	32	.396
Purdue ‍‍‍	13	–	19	.406	24	–	32	.429
Penn State ‍‍‍	11	–	19	.367	23	–	30	.434
x – Division champion ‡ – Tournament champion y – Invited to the NCAA tournament As of June 30, 2002; Rankings from Collegiate Baseball

The 2002 Big Ten Conference baseball tournament was held at Siebert Field on the campus of the University of Minnesota in Minneapolis, Minnesota, from May 15 through 19. The top six teams from the regular season participated in the double-elimination tournament, the twenty first annual tournament sponsored by the Big Ten Conference to determine the league champion. Ohio State won their fifth tournament championship and earned the Big Ten Conference's automatic bid to the 2002 NCAA Division I baseball tournament.

== Format and seeding ==
The 2002 tournament was a 6-team double-elimination tournament, with seeds determined by conference regular season winning percentage only. Northwestern claimed the sixth seed over Illinois by tiebreaker. For the first time, the top two seeds received a single bye, with the four lower seeds playing opening round games. The top seed played the lowest seeded winner from the opening round, with the second seed playing the higher seed. Teams that lost in the opening round played an elimination game.

Team	W	L	PCT	GB	Seed
Minnesota	18	10	.643	–	1
Ohio State	18	11	.621	.5	2
Michigan State	16	12	.571	2	3
Indiana	15	14	.517	3.5	4
Iowa	15	16	.484	4.5	5
Northwestern	14	15	.483	4.5	6
Illinois	14	15	.483	4.5	–
Michigan	14	17	.452	5.5	–
Purdue	13	19	.406	6.5	–
Penn State	11	19	.367	7.5	–

== Tournament ==
Upper round 1	Upper round 2	Upper final	Final
1	Minnesota	2
3	Michigan State	2	6	Northwestern	5
6	Northwestern	4	6	Northwestern	2
2	Ohio State	5
2	Ohio State	11*
4	Indiana	7	4	Indiana	10*
5	Iowa	4
2	Ohio State	6
1	Minnesota	3
Lower round 1	Lower round 2	Lower round 3	Lower final
6	Northwestern	5
1	Minnesota	6	1	Minnesota	11
4	Indiana	1	3	Michigan State	0
3	Michigan State	13	3	Michigan State	14
5	Iowa	9

* - Indicates game required 10 innings.

== All-Tournament Team ==
The following players were named to the All-Tournament Team.

Pos	Name	School
P	Gabe Ribas	Northwestern
P	E. J. Laratta	Ohio State
P	Scott Lewis	Ohio State
C	Joe Wilkins	Ohio State
1B	Brad Carlson	Iowa
2B	Luke Appert	Minnesota
SS	Eric Blakeley	Indiana
3B	Drew Anderson	Ohio State
OF	Bob Malek	Michigan State
OF	Doug Deeds	Ohio State
OF	Doug Dendinger	Ohio State
DH	Ben Pattee	Minnesota

=== Most Outstanding Player ===
Joe Wilkins was named Most Outstanding Player. Wilkins was a catcher for Ohio State.
