= 2009 Big Ten baseball tournament =

2009 Big Ten Conference baseball tournament
- Teams: 6
- Format: Double-elimination
- Finals site: Huntington Park (Columbus, Ohio); Columbus, OH
- Champions: Indiana (2nd title)
- Winning coach: Tracy Smith (1st title)
- MVP: Matt Bashore (Indiana)

2009 Big Ten Conference baseball standings
	Conf.				Overall
Team	W		L	PCT	W		L	PCT
No. 25 Ohio State ‍†‍‍^{y}	18	–	6	.750	42	–	19	.689
No. 26 Minnesota ‍‍‍^{y}	17	–	6	.739	40	–	19	.678
Indiana ‍‍‡‍^{y}	16	–	7	.696	32	–	27	.542
Illinois ‍‍‍	16	–	8	.667	34	–	20	.630
Michigan State ‍‍‍	13	–	11	.542	23	–	31	.426
Purdue ‍‍‍	11	–	12	.478	25	–	26	.490
Michigan ‍‍‍	9	–	15	.375	30	–	25	.545
Penn State ‍‍‍	8	–	16	.333	25	–	26	.490
Northwestern ‍‍‍	5	–	17	.227	14	–	35	.286
Iowa ‍‍‍	4	–	19	.174	16	–	35	.314
x – Division champion ‡ – Tournament champion y – Invited to the NCAA tournament As of June 30, 2009; Rankings from Collegiate Baseball

The 2009 Big Ten baseball tournament was held at Huntington Park in Columbus, Ohio, from May 20 through 24. Third seeded Indiana won their second tournament championship and earned the Big Ten Conference's automatic bid to the 2009 NCAA Division I baseball tournament.

== Format and seeding ==
The 2009 tournament was a 6-team double-elimination tournament, with seeds determined by conference regular season winning percentage only. As in the previous seven years, the top two seeds received a single bye, with the four lower seeds playing opening round games. The top seed played the lowest seeded winner from the opening round, with the second seed playing the higher seed. Teams that lost in the opening round played an elimination game.

Team	W	L	PCT	GB	Seed
Ohio State	18	6	.750	–	1
Minnesota	17	6	.739	.5	2
Indiana	16	7	.696	1.5	3
Illinois	16	8	.667	2	4
Michigan State	13	11	.542	5	5
Purdue	11	12	.478	6.5	6
Michigan	9	15	.375	9	–
Penn State	8	16	.333	10	–
Northwestern	5	17	.227	12	–
Iowa	4	19	.174	13.5	–

|}

== Results ==
Upper round 1	Upper round 2	Upper final	Final
1	Ohio State	7
5	Michigan State	5	4	Illinois	4
4	Illinois	16	1	Ohio State	3
3	Indiana	13
2	Minnesota	3
6	Purdue	1	3	Indiana	12
3	Indiana	9
3	Indiana	13
2	Minnesota	2
Lower round 1	Lower round 2	Lower round 3	Lower final
2	Minnesota	9
2	Minnesota	13	1	Ohio State	6
6	Purdue	3	4	Illinois	4
6	Purdue	12	2	Minnesota	12
5	Michigan State	9

* - Indicats game required extra innings.

== All-Tournament Team ==
The following players were named to the All-Tournament Team.

Pos	Name	School
P	Eric Arnett	Indiana
P	Matt Bashore	Indiana
P	Tim Buske	Minnesota
C	Dan Burkhart	Ohio State
1B	Nick O'Shea	Minnesota
2B	Derek McCallum	Minnesota
3B	Vince Gonzalez	Indiana
SS	Jake Dunning	Indiana
OF	Pete Cappetta	Illinois
OF	Kipp Schutz	Indiana
OF	Eric Decker	Minnesota
DH	Alex Dickerson	Indiana

=== Most Outstanding Player ===
Matt Bashore was named Most Outstanding Player. Bashore was a pitcher for Indiana.
