= Siebert Field =

University of Minnesota baseball park

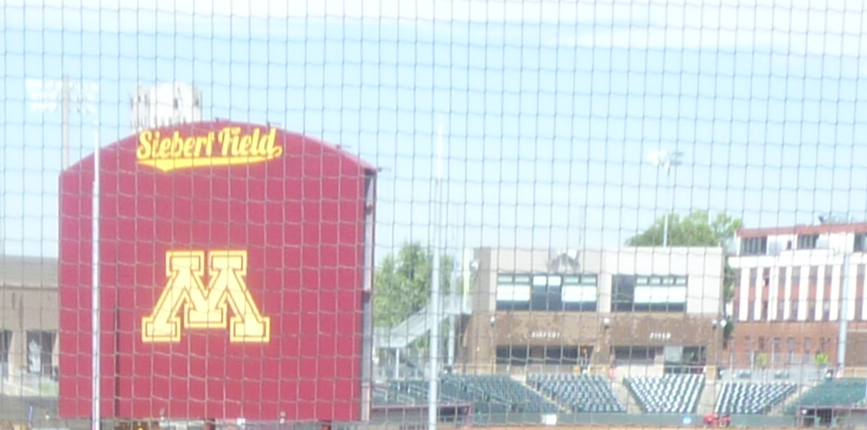
- Siebert Field
- Interactive map of Siebert Field
- Former names: Bierman Field (1971–78)
- Location: Minneapolis, Minnesota
- Coordinates: 44.9826°N 93.2297°W
- Owner: University of Minnesota
- Operator: University of Minnesota
- Capacity: 1,420
- Surface: Mondo Turf (artificial)
- Field size: Left – 330 ft (101 m); LC – 365 ft (111 m); Center – 390 ft (119 m); RC – 365 ft (111 m); Right – 330 ft (101 m)

Construction
- Opened: 1971, 2013
- Cost: $7.2 million
- Architect: DLR Group

Tenants
- Minnesota Golden Gophers (NCAA) (1971–2009, 2013–present)

Siebert Field is a baseball park in Minneapolis, Minnesota, in the United States. It is the home venue for the University of Minnesota Golden Gophers of the Big Ten Conference, and is named in honor of Dick Siebert, a former head coach who led the Gophers to three national titles. From 1971 to 1978, the venue was known as Bierman Field in honor of Bernie Bierman.

== History ==
In 1971, Siebert Field was built to replace the university's former baseball venue, Delta Field, which was located beyond the left field fence of the present facility. Siebert Field, which featured natural grass and a capacity of 1,500, was constructed on a single large block near Dinkytown. The original facility was demolished in 2012 and replaced with a brand new ballpark at the same location. The new facility bears the same name as its predecessor.

=== Old Siebert Field ===
The Old Siebert Field hosted its first game on April 23, 1971 – a 2–1 Gopher victory over Creighton. At the time, the ballpark was considered one of the most modern in collegiate athletics, with an electronic scoreboard, automatic irrigation, and a state-of-the-art press box. In addition to serving as the Golden Gophers' primary home venue, the old Siebert Field occasionally hosted other events and teams, including numerous Minnesota State High School League baseball tournament games. In 1994–1995, Siebert Field was home to an independent professional team, the Minneapolis Loons, of the now-defunct North Central League. Three NCAA Regional tournaments were played there in 1974, 1977, and 2000, respectively, as well as six Big Ten Conference baseball tournaments: 1984, 1986, 2000, 2002, 2003, and 2004.

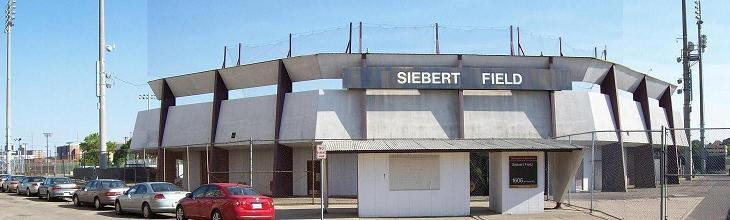
The old Siebert Field façade.

As the old Siebert Field aged, its infrastructure, particularly the grandstand, became dilapidated. As a result, the University of Minnesota men's baseball team, which had routinely played cold-weather games at the former Hubert H. Humphrey Metrodome (an indoor venue), began favoring the downtown-located Metrodome over Siebert as their primary home stadium. In 2004, the team played the majority of its home games at the Metrodome for the first time – a trend that continued until 2010, when all home games were played at the Metrodome (save for one which was played at nearby Target Field). The 2011 schedule also called for the team's home games to be played at the Metrodome; however, the collapse of the Metrodome's roof and the subsequent heavy damage to the stadium forced the Gophers to move elsewhere. Games scheduled in March were moved to other cities or canceled. Twelve home games against Big Ten Conference opponents were moved to Target Field, while three midweek non-conference games were played at Siebert Field.

In 2012, the Gophers continued using the Metrodome as its primary home venue, save for one game at Target Field and one game at Siebert Field, the latter of which was held on May 1, and was the final game played at that facility – a 9–2 win over St. Thomas.

=== New Siebert Field ===
A groundbreaking was held at the new facility on June 11, 2012, after which the reconstruction project began, including the demolition of the old facility, building of the new grandstands and dugouts, and installation of the new playing surface and 36-by-30-foot (11 by 9 m) Daktronics scoreboard. The new Siebert Field hosted its first game on April 5, 2013, which the Gophers won 7–0 over Ohio State.

Additional upgrades to the new facility are ongoing. Lights were installed prior to the 2014 season, and its first night game was played on April 25. Prospective upgrades, including construction of an indoor training facility, upgraded home and visitor locker rooms, new offices, an umpires’ locker room, and a canopy, have no timetable for completion.

== Location ==
Siebert Field is located at the intersection of 15th Avenue SE and 8th Street SE in Minneapolis. The block is bounded by 15th Avenue SE and railroad tracks to the northwest and north; 8th Street SE, to the northeast; 5th Street SE, to the southwest; and railroad tracks to the south and southeast. The field itself is set back from 15th Avenue, with a football practice field in between. The facility is adjacent to other University athletic facilities including track-and-field, football, softball, and indoor sports venues.

The diamond has an unorthodox southeastern alignment (home plate to center field); the recommended orientation is east-northeast. The elevation of the field is approximately 800 feet (245 m) above sea level.

== See also ==
- List of NCAA Division I baseball venues
