= Ted Mahan =

American baseball player and coach

Biographical details
- Born: September 7, 1955 (age 71); Saginaw, Michigan, U.S.
- Education: University of Michigan (1977)

Playing career
- 1974–1977: Michigan
- Position: Catcher

Coaching career (HC unless noted)
- 1981–1987: Grossi Connie Mack Baseball Club (Flint, Michigan)
- 1983–1987: Davison (MI) HS
- 1988: Michigan (GA)
- 1989–1991: Michigan (assistant)
- 1992–1995: Michigan State (assistant)
- 1996–2005: Michigan State
- 2007–2016: Olivet

Head coaching record
- Overall: 381–567 (college); 127–56 (high school); 257–98 (Connie Mack)
- Tournaments: NCAA:

Accomplishments and honors

Championships
- 2× Big Ten Champion (1975, 1976); 3× HS Conference Champion (1983, 1985, 1986); HS District Champion (1985)

Awards
- NCAA All-Mideast Region Team (1975); 3× All Big Ten Third-Team; Michigan Co-MVP (1977) w/ Rick Leach

Ted Mahan (born September 7, 1955) is an American former college baseball coach and catcher. He was the head baseball coach at Michigan State University from 1996 to 2005 and at Olivet College from 2007 to 2016.

== Head coaching record ==
Record table
Season	Team	Overall	Conference	Standing	Postseason
Michigan State Spartans (Big Ten Conference) (1996–2005)
1996	Michigan State	14–41	–		
1997	Michigan State	26–28	–		
1998	Michigan State	25–27	–		
1999	Michigan State	28–25	–		
2000	Michigan State	20–36	–		
2001	Michigan State	29–27	–		
2002	Michigan State	38–19	–		
2003	Michigan State	21–34	–		
2004	Michigan State	33–26	19–13	3rd	
2005	Michigan State	22–31	–		
Michigan State:		256–294	–		
Olivet Comets (Michigan Intercollegiate Athletic Association) (2007–2016)
2007	Olivet	14–26	8–10	8th	
2008	Olivet	17–23	15–13	3rd	
2009	Olivet	19–21	15–13	T–3rd	
2010	Olivet	10–30	8–20	6th	
2011	Olivet	11–28	8–20	8th	
2012	Olivet	12–28	9–19	T–6th	
2013	Olivet	20–20	13–15	5th	
2014	Olivet	10–30	7–21	8th	
2015	Olivet	7–33	6–22	8th	
2016	Olivet	5–34	2–26	8th	
Olivet:		125–273	91–179		
Total:		381–567			
National champion Postseason invitational champion Conference regular season champion Conference regular season and conference tournament champion Division regular season champion Division regular season and conference tournament champion Conference tournament champion
