= Ben Greenspan =

American baseball coach

Current position
- Title: Head coach
- Team: Northwestern
- Conference: Big Ten
- Record: 64–91–1 (.413)

Biographical details
- Born: 1983 or 1984 (age 42–43)
- Education: Indiana

Playing career
- 2004–2005: UConn
- 2006–2007: Indiana
- Positions: Catcher, first base

Coaching career (HC unless noted)
- 2009–2014: Indiana (assistant)
- 2015–2017: Arizona State (assistant)
- 2018–2021: Arizona State (associate)
- 2022: Cal Poly (assistant)
- 2023: Michigan (associate)
- 2024–present: Northwestern

Head coaching record
- Overall: 64–91–1 (.413)

Ben Greenspan is an American college baseball coach and former player. Greenspan is the head coach for the Northwestern Wildcats baseball team, serving since 2023.

== College career ==
Greenspan attended James I. O'Neill High School in West Point, New York where his father was Athletic Director for the United States Military Academy. He later attended Salisbury School in Connecticut for prep school.

Greenspan first attended the University of Connecticut, where he played catcher and first baseman for their baseball team for two years. Before his junior year, Greenspan transferred to the University of Indiana, where his father was the school's Athletic Director. He would spend the remainder of his college career with the Indiana Hoosiers baseball team. Greenspan graduated in 2007 with a bachelor's degree in sport marketing and management and later received a master's degree from Indiana in sport administration.

== Coaching career ==
Greenspan's first college coaching job was at Indiana, acting as an assistant coach in various roles from 2009 to 2014. Before the 2015 season, Greenspan joined the Arizona State Sun Devils baseball team as an assistant coach. In 2018, Greenspan was promoted to associate head coach until 2021. Greenspan then joined the Cal Poly Mustangs baseball team as an assistant coach in 2022, spending one year there. After his sole year at Cal Poly, Greenspan became an associate head coach again, now joining the Michigan Wolverines baseball team for the 2023 season. Following one year at Michigan, Greenspan was hired as the head coach on August 18, 2023, for the Northwestern Wildcats baseball team before the 2024 season.

== Head coaching record ==
Record table
Season	Team	Overall	Conference	Standing	Postseason
Northwestern Wildcats (Big Ten Conference) (2024–present)
2024	Northwestern	18–34	4–20	13th	
2025	Northwestern	25–27	13–17	13th	
2026	Northwestern	21–30–1	8–22	16th	
Northwestern:		64–91–1 (.413)	25–59 (.298)		
Total:		64–91–1 (.413)			
National champion Postseason invitational champion Conference regular season champion Conference regular season and conference tournament champion Division regular season champion Division regular season and conference tournament champion Conference tournament champion
