= John Anderson (baseball coach) =

American baseball coach (1955–2026)

Biographical details
- Born: May 16, 1955; Hibbing, Minnesota, U.S.
- Died: July 26, 2026 (aged 71); Minnesota, U.S.
- Education: Minnesota ('77)

Playing career
- 1974–1975: Minnesota
- Position: Pitcher

Coaching career (HC unless noted)
- 1976–1977: Minnesota (SA)
- 1978: Minnesota (GA)
- 1979–1981: Minnesota (asst.)
- 1982–2024: Minnesota

Head coaching record
- Overall: 1,390–1,021–3
- Tournaments: NCAA: 20–38

Accomplishments and honors

Championships
- 4× Big Ten Western Division Championships (1983, 1984, 1986, 1987); 7× Big Ten Regular season Championships (2000, 2002, 2003, 2004, 2010, 2016, 2018); 10× Big Ten tournament Championships (1982, 1985, 1988, 1992, 1993, 1998, 2001, 2004, 2010, 2018); 18× NCAA tournament Appearances (1982, 1985, 1987, 1988, 1991, 1992, 1993, 1994, 1998, 1999, 2000, 2001, 2003, 2004, 2007, 2009, 2010, 2016, 2018)

Awards
- 8× Big Ten Conference Coach of the Year (1982, 2000, 2002, 2003, 2004, 2010, 2016, 2018); ABCA Hall of Fame Inductee (2008)

John Anderson (May 16, 1955 – July 26, 2026) was an American baseball pitcher and college baseball coach. He was the head baseball coach at the University of Minnesota from 1982 to 2024. Anderson played college baseball at the University of Minnesota from 1974 to 1975, until injuries ended his career. In 38 seasons (as of the end of the 2019 season), Anderson led the Golden Gophers to a record of 1,317 wins, 887 losses, and three ties. In the Big Ten, he led Golden Gophers to a record of 592 wins and 351 losses in that same span.

== Playing career ==
Anderson graduated from Nashwauk-Keewatin High School in Nashwauk, Minnesota, in 1973. Anderson then enrolled at the University of Minnesota, where he walked on to the Minnesota Golden Gophers baseball team. After pitching for two years, an arm injury forced Anderson to quit playing. He remained as a student-coach for the next two years, and was even voted as MVP of the 1977 team.

== Coaching career ==
Following his graduation in 1977, longtime Gophers coach Dick Siebert named him a graduate assistant. Siebert died in the winter of 1978, and successor as head coach George Thomas named Anderson a full-time assistant. Thomas resigned in 1981, and Anderson became head coach at the age of 26–at the time, the youngest head baseball coach in Big Ten history. He spent his entire adult life at the University of Minnesota as a player, assistant coach or head coach.

His most successful team was the 2018 unit, which reached the super regional round–the Gophers' deepest tournament run since their last College World Series appearance in 1977.

Anderson announced in December 2023 that 2024 would be his last season coaching. He had spent the first half-century of his adult life at Minnesota as a player, assistant coach and head coach.

== Head coaching record ==
Below is a table of Anderson's yearly records as an NCAA head baseball coach.

Record table
Season	Team	Overall	Conference	Standing	Postseason
Minnesota Golden Gophers (Big Ten Conference) (1982–2024)
1982	Minnesota	33–22–1	8–8	T–2nd (Western)	NCAA Regional
1983	Minnesota	27–21	12–2	1st (Western)	Big Ten tournament
1984	Minnesota	31–20	11–5	1st (Western)	Big Ten tournament
1985	Minnesota	33–23	9–7	2nd (Western)	NCAA Regional
1986	Minnesota	40–19	10–5	1st (Western)	Big Ten tournament
1987	Minnesota	36–25	12–4	1st (Western)	NCAA Regional
1988	Minnesota	38–28	17–11	2nd	NCAA Regional
1989	Minnesota	31–22–1	15–12	5th	
1990	Minnesota	36–24–1	19–9	T–2nd	Big Ten tournament
1991	Minnesota	37–27	18–10	2nd	NCAA Regional
1992	Minnesota	42–21	18–10	2nd	NCAA Regional
1993	Minnesota	43–18	17–9	2nd	NCAA Regional
1994	Minnesota	42–21	21–7	2nd	NCAA Regional
1995	Minnesota	31–28	16–12	2nd	Big Ten tournament
1996	Minnesota	30–26	15–12	5th	
1997	Minnesota	30–24	15–10	5th	
1998	Minnesota	45–15	19–9	2nd	NCAA Regional
1999	Minnesota	46–18	21–7	2nd	NCAA Regional
2000	Minnesota	38–24	20–8	1st	NCAA Regional
2001	Minnesota	39–21	19–8	3rd	NCAA Regional
2002	Minnesota	32–26	18–10	1st	Big Ten tournament
2003	Minnesota	40–22	24–6	1st	NCAA Regional
2004	Minnesota	38–23	21–10	1st	NCAA Regional
2005	Minnesota	33–29	17–15	6th	Big Ten tournament
2006	Minnesota	34–26	17–14	4th	Big Ten tournament
2007	Minnesota	41–18	18–9	T–2nd	NCAA Regional
2008	Minnesota	20–35	10–21	9th	
2009	Minnesota	40–19	17–6	2nd	NCAA Regional
2010	Minnesota	32–30	15–9	1st	NCAA Regional
2011	Minnesota	25–24	13–11	T–4th	Big Ten tournament
2012	Minnesota	29–27	11–13	T–6th	
2013	Minnesota	32–22	13–8	4th	Big Ten tournament
2014	Minnesota	27–24	13–11	T-4th	Big Ten tournament
2015	Minnesota	21–30	9–15	9th	
2016	Minnesota	36–22	16–7	1st	Big Ten tournament
2017	Minnesota	36–21	15–8	3rd	Big Ten tournament
2018	Minnesota	44–15	18–4	1st	NCAA Super Regional
2019	Minnesota	29–27	15–9	T-3rd	Big Ten tournament
2020	Minnesota	8–10	0–0		Season canceled due to COVID-19
2021	Minnesota	6–31	6–31	13th	
2022	Minnesota	16–36	6–18	13th	
2023	Minnesota	18–34	10–14	10th	
2024	Minnesota	25–23	11–13	T–9th	
Total:		1,390–1,021–3			
National champion Postseason invitational champion Conference regular season champion Conference regular season and conference tournament champion Division regular season champion Division regular season and conference tournament champion Conference tournament champion

== Awards and honors ==
- Big Ten Coach of the Year (1982, 2000, 2002, 2003, 2004, 2010, 2016, 2018)
- ABCA Hall of Fame Inductee

== Personal life and death ==
Anderson graduated from the University of Minnesota in 1977 with a B.S. in Education. Anderson and his wife Jan are the parents of daughter Erin Elizabeth.

On July 24, 2026, it was reported that Anderson had suffered a heart attack and was in a coma in an intensive-care unit of a Minnesota hospital. He died two days later, on July 26, at the age of 71.

== See also ==
- List of college baseball career coaching wins leaders
