= 2011 Big Ten baseball tournament =

2011 Big Ten Conference baseball tournament
- Teams: 6
- Format: Double-elimination with single bye for top two teams
- Finals site: Huntington Park (Columbus, Ohio); Columbus, OH
- Champions: Illinois (4th title)
- Television: BTN

2011 Big Ten Conference baseball standings
	Conf.				Overall
Team	W		L	PCT	W		L	PCT
Michigan State ‍†‍‍	15	–	9	.625	36	–	21	.632
Illinois ‍†‍‡‍	15	–	9	.625	30	–	27	.526
Purdue ‍‍‍	14	–	10	.583	37	–	20	.649
Minnesota ‍‍‍	13	–	11	.542	25	–	24	.510
Ohio State ‍‍‍	13	–	11	.542	26	–	27	.491
Penn State ‍‍‍	12	–	12	.500	32	–	22	.593
Indiana ‍‍‍	11	–	13	.458	30	–	25	.545
Northwestern ‍‍‍	10	–	13	.435	20	–	29	.408
Iowa ‍‍‍	9	–	15	.375	20	–	32	.385
Michigan ‍‍‍	7	–	16	.304	17	–	37	.315
† – Conference champion ‡ – Tournament champion As of June 30, 2011; Rankings from Coaches' Poll

The 2011 Big Ten Conference baseball tournament was held at Huntington Park in Columbus, Ohio, from May 23 through 26. Top seeded Illinois won their fourth tournament title and claimed the Big Ten Conference's automatic bid to the 2011 NCAA Division I baseball tournament.

== Regular season results ==
The top six teams (based on conference results, with head-to-head results serving as tiebreakers) from the conference earn invites to the tournament.

Team	W	L	PCT	GB	Seed
Illinois	15	9	.625	–	1
Michigan State	15	9	.625	–	2
Purdue	14	10	.583	1	3
Ohio State	13	11	.542	2	4
Minnesota	13	11	.542	2	5
Penn State	12	12	.4500	3	6
Indiana	11	13	.458	4	–
Northwestern	10	13	.435	4.5	–
Iowa	9	15	.375	6	–
Michigan	7	16	.304	7.5	–

== Format ==
The 2011 tournament was a 6-team double-elimination tournament. The top two seeds received a single bye into the semifinals (2nd Round). The 1 seed played the lowest seeded Round 1 winner, while the 2 seed played the highest seeded Round 1 winner.

== Bracket ==
Upper round 1	Upper round 2	Upper final	Final
2	Michigan State	7
4	Ohio State	5	3	Purdue	1
5	Minnesota	3	2	Michigan State	1
1	Illinois	4
1	Illinois	5
3	Purdue	7	4	Ohio State	4
6	Penn State	2
1	Illinois	9
2	Michigan State	1
Lower round 1	Lower round 2	Lower round 3	Lower final
2	Michigan State	6
3	Purdue	0	5	Minnesota	3
4	Ohio State	4	5	Minnesota	1
5	Minnesota	8	5	Minnesota	9
6	Penn State	2
