= Chris Harrison (baseball coach) =

American baseball coach

Coaching career (HC unless noted)
- 1991–1994: The Master's College
- 1996–2001: Michigan (asst.)
- 2002: Michigan

Head coaching record
- Overall: 104-132

Chris Harrison is an American former baseball coach. He was the interim head coach of the Michigan Wolverines baseball team from October 2001 to May 2002. He joined the Michigan coaching staff in September 1995 as an assistant baseball coach under Geoff Zahn; he remained in that position for six years. During Harrison's single year as head coach, the Michigan baseball team led the Big Ten Conference in pitching but finished the season with a 21-32 record (14-17 in the Big Ten). Harrison resigned as head coach in late May 2002; he was replaced in June 2002 by Rich Maloney. Before coaching at Michigan, Harrison was the head baseball coach at The Master's College in Santa Clarita, California, from June 1990 to May 1994. In 1991, he led the Master's Mustangs to a school record 28 victories and was named the NAIA District 3 Coach of the Year. Through the 1991 season, he had become the only baseball coach in the school's history with a winning record. After the team finished at 14-32-2 in 1992, Harrison resigned at the request of school officials. His overall record at The Master's College was 83-100-2.
