= Huntington Park (Columbus, Ohio) =

Baseball stadium in Columbus, Ohio, US

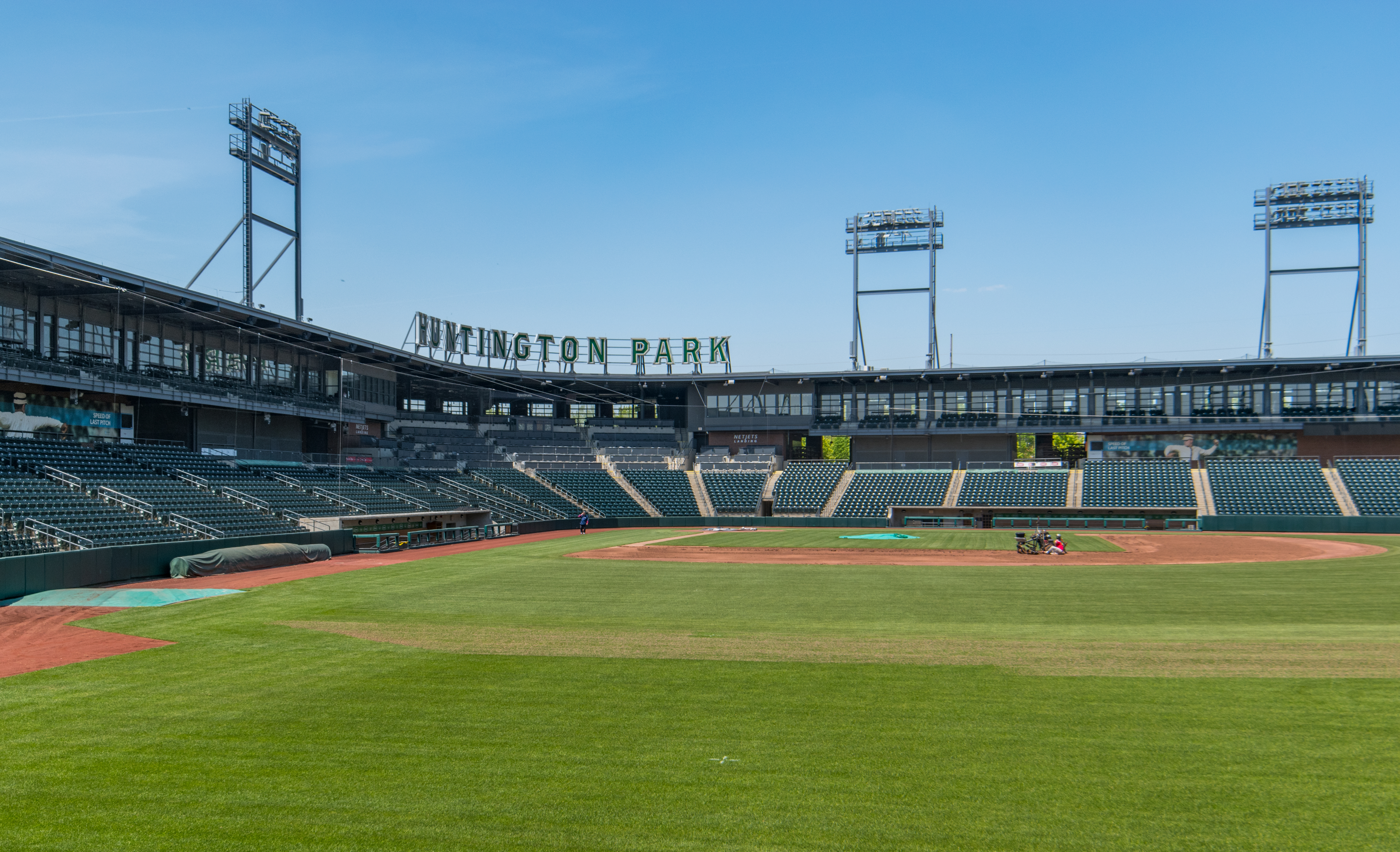

- Location within Ohio Location within the United States
- Location: 330 Huntington Park Lane; Columbus, Ohio; United States
- Coordinates: 39.968619°N 83.010743°W
- Owner: Franklin County government
- Operator: Franklin County government
- Capacity: 10,100
- Surface: Natural Grass
- Field size: Left field: 325 ft (99 m); Left-center field: 360 ft (110 m); Center field: 400 ft (120 m); Right-center field: 365 ft (111 m); Right field: 318 ft (97 m)
- Public transit: 3, 8

Construction
- Groundbreaking: August 2, 2007
- Opened: April 18, 2009
- Cost: $70 Million ($105 million in 2025 dollars)
- Architects: 360 Architecture; Moody Nolan, Inc.
- Project managers: International Facilities Group, LLC.
- Structural engineers: Jezerinac Geers & Associates, Inc.
- Services engineers: Prater Engineering Associates, Inc.
- General contractor: Turner/Tuttle
- Main contractors: McDaniel’s Construction Corp., Inc.

Tenant
- Columbus Clippers (IL) 2009–present

Website
- http://huntingtonparkcolumbus.com/

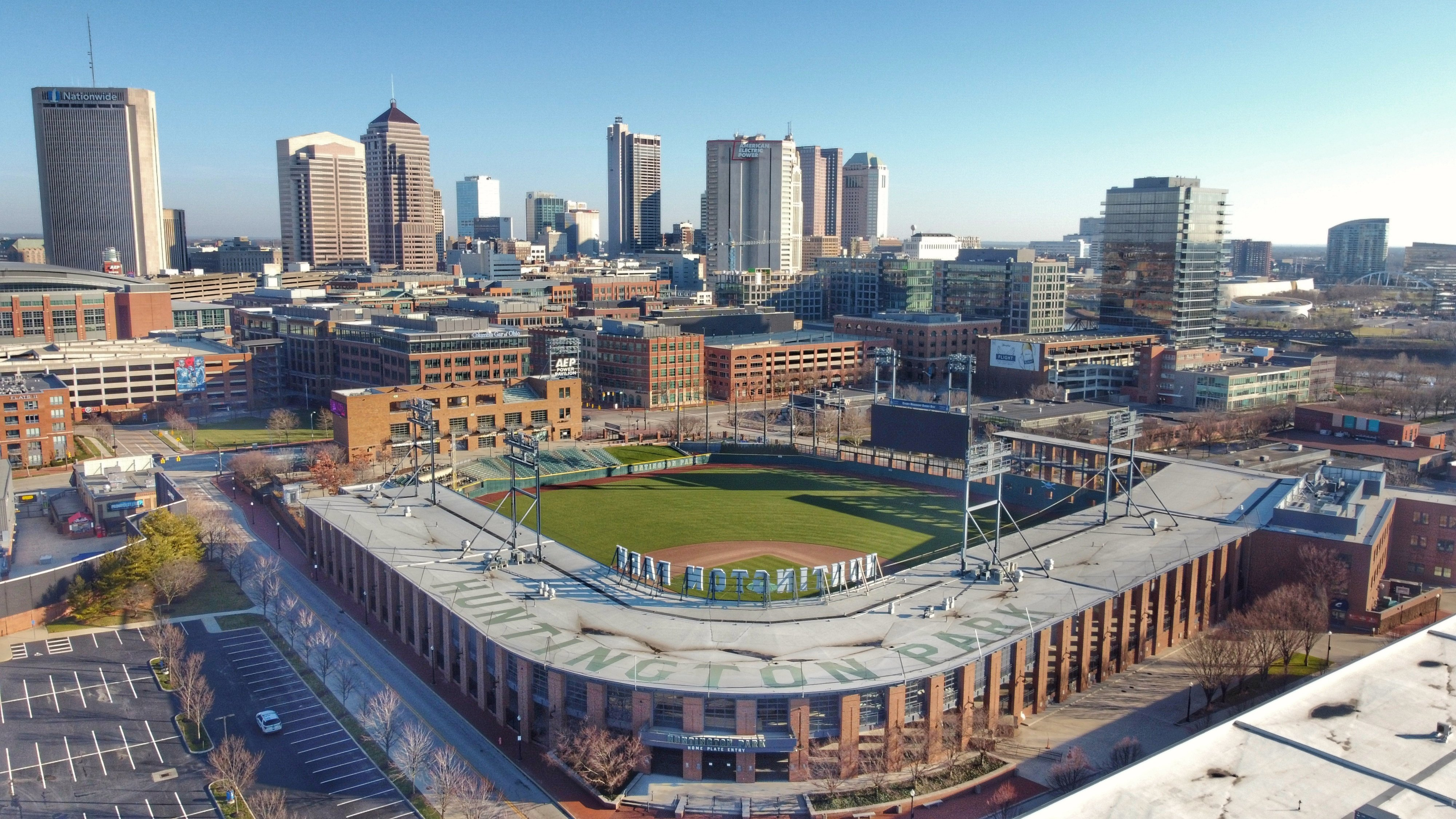

Huntington Park is a baseball stadium located in Columbus, Ohio, United States. It primarily serves as the home of the Columbus Clippers of the International League, the Triple-A minor league affiliate of the Cleveland Guardians since 2009.

Groundbreaking for the ballpark took place on August 2, 2007, with construction being completed in April 2009. Designed by 360 Architecture and developed by Nationwide Realty Investors, the 10,100-seat stadium is part of a $70 million project. The stadium is at the corner of Neil Avenue and Nationwide Boulevard in the Arena District of Columbus and replaced the Clippers' former home, Cooper Stadium.

In February 2006, the naming rights for the park were purchased by Huntington Bancshares Inc. for $12 million over 23 years. On April 18, 2009, the park opened to the public, with the Columbus Clippers playing the Toledo Mud Hens in the stadium's first game.

On August 12, 2009, Huntington Park was named the Ballpark of the Year by Baseballparks.com, beating out all other new or significantly renovated baseball stadiums in the country, including such Major League parks as the new Yankee Stadium and Citi Field. The award is given to the new stadium with the "best combination of superior design, attractive site selection and fan amenities."

The ballpark's attendance record was set on July 26, 2010 when 12,517 fans saw the Clippers defeat the Pawtucket Red Sox, 11–7. In 2023, the Clippers drew an average home attendance of 7,847 in 71 home games, the third highest in Minor League Baseball.

The coldest game played in the history of the stadium saw Clippers take on the Pawtucket Red Sox on April 16, 2018, amidst snow flurries and 35 degree weather.

The ballpark was built adjacent to the old Ohio Penitentiary site.

== Construction issues ==
The selection of the construction firms to build the ballpark was a contentious issue. On November 5, 2007, Lithko Contracting of Hamilton filed suit against Franklin County. At issue was that the contract for pouring concrete was awarded to Baker Construction despite Lithko's bid coming in $17,500 lower. It was alleged that the Franklin County Commissioners had favored Baker over Lithko because Baker employed union labor and Lithko did not. Because the Commissioners did not want to face delays due to a lawsuit, they awarded the contract to Lithko on November 9, 2007.

The county was subsequently sued two more times by firms after they were denied the contracts despite being low bidders. In those cases, the county rejected the low bid due to allegations of "prevailing wage" violations by the low bidders. State Representative Larry Wolpert (R-23) had asked the state controlling board not to release $7 million in funds until the low bidders were selected.

== Features ==
The ballpark includes 32 suites, 42 loge boxes, and 650 club seats. The Left Field Building includes a 110-foot bar with six open patios overlooking the field on the second story. The third story is The AEP Power Pavilion, an open air rooftop with bleachers reminiscent of Wrigley Field. The Picnic Terrace in left field will offer fans a place to relax and take in a ballgame 325 feet down the line. The Pedialyte Porch in right field overlooks a 22-foot wall that is only 318 feet down the line.

== Other uses ==
The park hosted the 2009, 2011, and 2012 Big Ten Conference baseball tournaments.

The park has also hosted the OHSAA High School Baseball state championship games since its opening in 2009.

The stadium hosted both the Triple-A All-Star Game and the Triple-A National Championship Game in 2018.

=== Concerts ===
On June 22, 2010 Huntington Park held its first major concert. Dave Matthews Band performed on a stage in center field.

On June 14, 2012 REO Speedwagon performed a concert at Huntington Park.

== See also ==
- The Father of Columbus Baseball (2009)

Events and tenants
Preceded by Cooper Stadium	Home of the Columbus Clippers; 2009–present	Succeeded by current
