= Tracy Smith (baseball) =

American college baseball coach (born 1966)

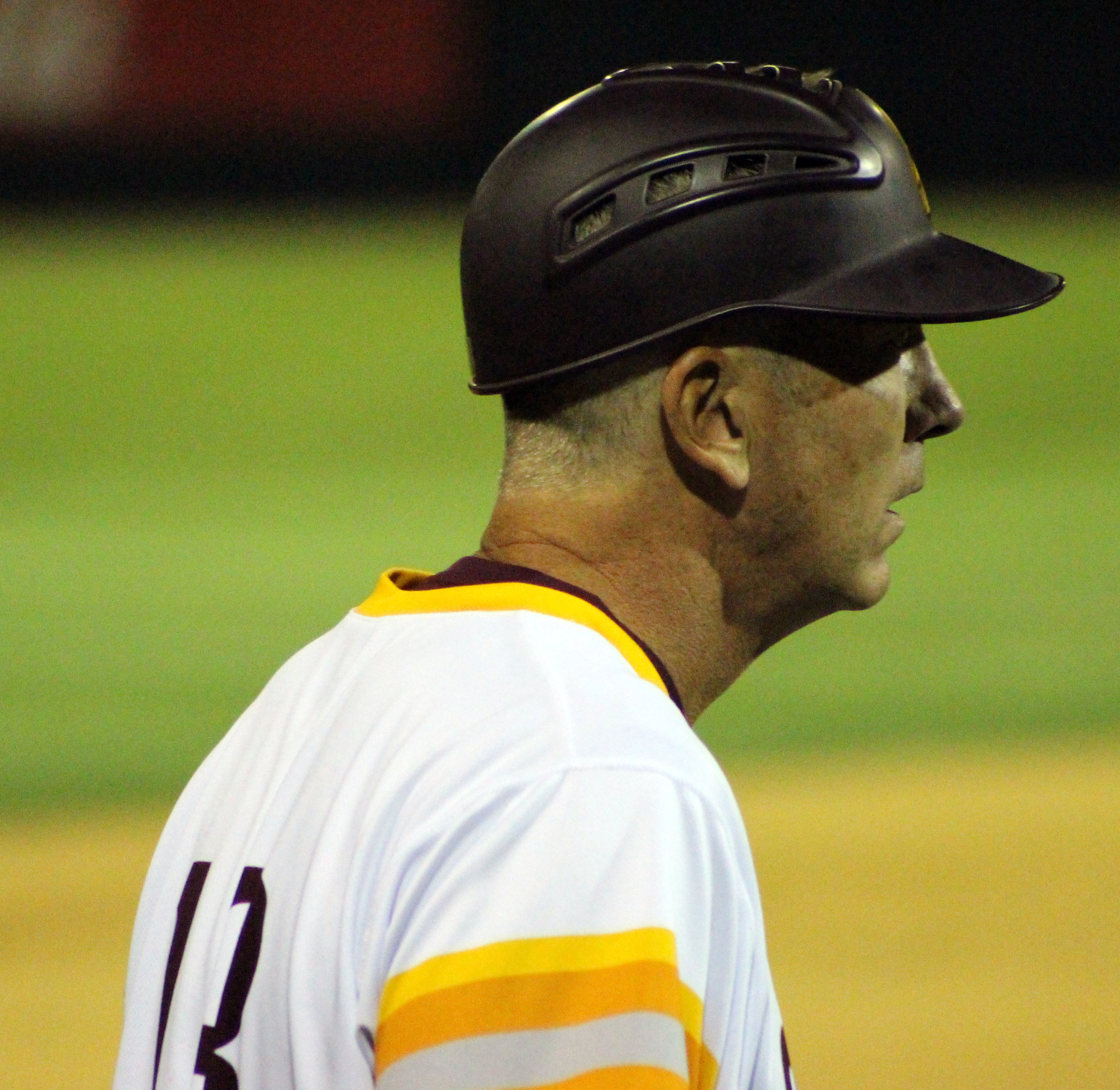
- Smith in 2015

Current position
- Title: Head coach
- Team: Michigan
- Conference: Big Ten
- Record: 127–103 (.552)

Biographical details
- Born: February 14, 1966 (age 60); Kentland, Indiana, U.S.
- Education: Miami University

Playing career
- 1985–1988: Miami (OH)
- 1988: Geneva Cubs
- 1989: Peoria Chiefs
- 1990: Winston-Salem Spirits
- Positions: SS, 3B, P

Coaching career (HC unless noted)
- 1991–1992: Miami-Middletown
- 1993–1994: Miami (OH) (asst.)
- 1995–1996: Indiana (asst.)
- 1997–2005: Miami (OH)
- 2006–2014: Indiana
- 2015–2021: Arizona State
- 2023–present: Michigan

Head coaching record
- Overall: 932–715–1 (.566)
- Tournaments: NCAA: 12–14; MAC: 24–15; Big Ten: 23–15

Accomplishments and honors

Championships
- 2x MAC tournament (2000, 2005); 2x MAC East (2004, 2005); MAC regular season (2005); 2x Big Ten regular season (2013, 2014); 3x Big Ten tournament (2009, 2013, 2014)

Awards
- 2x Big Ten Coach of the Year (2013, 2014); MAC Coach of the Year (2005)

Tracy Smith (born February 14, 1966) is an American baseball coach and former player, who is the current head baseball coach of the Michigan Wolverines. He played college baseball at Miami (OH) from 1985 to 1988 for head coach Jon Pavlisko, before pursuing a professional career from 1988 to 1990. He then served as the head coach of the Miami RedHawks (1997–2005), the Indiana Hoosiers (2006–2014) and the Arizona State Sun Devils (2015–2021).

Smith was the head coach of Indiana from 2006 to 2014, during which time the Hoosiers appeared in three NCAA tournaments, advancing to the College World Series once. As the head coach of Miami (OH) from 1997–2005, Smith led the RedHawks to two NCAA tournaments.

== Playing career ==
Smith played for South Newton High School.

Smith then played four seasons (1985–1988) of college baseball at Miami (OH). In the 1988 MLB draft, he was selected in the 39th round by the Chicago Cubs. Smith played three seasons of minor league baseball in the Cubs system, advancing to Class A-Advanced before retiring following the 1990 season.

== Coaching career ==
=== Early career ===
Early in his career, Smith was a junior college head coach and Division I assistant. He spent two seasons (1991–1992) as the head coach of Miami–Middletown. He then served as hitting instructor at Miami from 1993 to 1994, where he had earned a master's degree in 1992. He moved to Indiana following the 1994 season and served as pitching coach from 1995 to 1996.

=== Miami ===
For the 1997 season, Smith returned to Miami to be the Redhawks' head coach. He held the position from 1997 to 2005. During Smith's tenure, Miami appeared in nine MAC Tournaments and two NCAA tournaments (2000 and 2005). In 2000, Miami went 1–2 as the #4 seed in the Tempe Regional, winning an elimination game against Creighton. In 2005, they again went 1–2 as the #3 seed in the Austin Regional, defeating Quinnipiac, 35–8, in an elimination game. Miami's 35 runs set a then-NCAA record for runs in an NCAA tournament game.

=== Indiana ===
After making a second NCAA tournament in 2005, Smith was hired to replace Bob Morgan as head coach of Indiana. In his third season (2008), Indiana made its first Big Ten tournament appearance since 2003. In 2009, Indiana won the Big Ten tournament and appeared in the NCAA Louisville Regional, where it went 0–2.

==== 2013 season ====
In 2013, the Hoosiers won the Big Ten regular season and tournament titles. For the first time, Indiana was selected to host an NCAA Regional. It won the regional, then won the Tallahassee Super Regional to advance to the program's first College World Series. Smith was named the NCBWA National Coach of the Year.

=== Arizona State ===
On June 24, 2014, Smith was named head coach of Arizona State. After leading the Sun Devils to a 201–155 mark over seven years, Smith was fired after the 2021 season and replaced by Willie Bloomquist.

=== Michigan ===
On July 3, 2022, Smith was named head coach of Michigan.

== Head coaching record ==
Below is a table of Smith's yearly records as an NCAA head baseball coach.

Record table
Season	Team	Overall	Conference	Standing	Postseason
Miami RedHawks (Mid-American Conference) (1997–2005)
1997	Miami (OH)	27–28	17–13	4th	
1998	Miami (OH)	33–26	17–13	3rd (East)	
1999	Miami (OH)	34–27	20–12	2nd (East)	
2000	Miami (OH)	40–23	16–12	3rd (East)	NCAA Regional
2001	Miami (OH)	35–25	16–12	4th (East)	
2002	Miami (OH)	31–28	16–12	3rd (East)	
2003	Miami (OH)	36–24–1	19–9	2nd (East)	
2004	Miami (OH)	36–21	14–8	1st (East)	
2005	Miami (OH)	45–18	17–4	1st (East)	NCAA Regional
Miami (OH):		317–220–1	152–95		
Indiana Hoosiers (Big Ten Conference) (2006–2014)
2006	Indiana	22–34	11–21	10th	
2007	Indiana	19–35	8–23	10th	
2008	Indiana	31–30	15–17	6th	
2009	Indiana	32–27	16–7	3rd	NCAA Regional
2010	Indiana	28–27	12–12	T-5th	
2011	Indiana	30–25	11–13	7th	
2012	Indiana	32–28	16–8	2nd	
2013	Indiana	49–16	17–7	1st	College World Series
2014	Indiana	44–15	21–3	1st	NCAA Regional
Indiana:		287–237	127–111		
Arizona State Sun Devils (Pac-12 Conference) (2015–2021)
2015	Arizona State	35–23	18–12	T-3rd	NCAA Regional
2016	Arizona State	36–23	16–14	T-3rd	NCAA Regional
2017	Arizona State	23–32	8–22	T-10th	
2018	Arizona State	23–32	13–17	7th	
2019	Arizona State	38–19	16–13	5th	NCAA Regional
2020	Arizona State	13–4	0–0		Season canceled due to COVID-19
2021	Arizona State	33–22	16–14	T-5th	NCAA Regional
Arizona State:		201–155	87–92		
Michigan Wolverines (Big Ten Conference) (2023–present)
2023	Michigan	28–28	13–11	6th	Big Ten tournament
2024	Michigan	32–28	14–10	T-4th	Big Ten tournament
2025	Michigan	33–23	16–14	T-6th	Big Ten tournament
2026	Michigan	34–24	17–13	7th	Big Ten tournament
Michigan:		127–103 (.552)	60–48 (.556)		
Total:		932–715–1 (.566)			
National champion Postseason invitational champion Conference regular season champion Conference regular season and conference tournament champion Division regular season champion Division regular season and conference tournament champion Conference tournament champion

== See also ==
- List of current NCAA Division I baseball coaches
