= Bob Todd (baseball) =

American baseball player and coach (born 1948)

Biographical details
- Born: September 27, 1948 (age 78); St. Louis, Missouri, U.S.

Playing career
- 1968: Missouri
- Position: Infielder

Coaching career (HC unless noted)
- 1971–1973: Ritenour HS (P)
- 1974–1983: Missouri (P)
- 1984–1987: Kent State
- 1988–2010: Ohio State

Head coaching record
- Overall: 901–477–2
- Tournaments: NCAA: 21–26

Accomplishments and honors

Awards
- 4× Big Ten Coach of the Year (1989, 1994, 1999, 2001); National Coach of the Year (1994)

Bob Todd (born September 27, 1948) is an American former baseball coach and pitcher. He was the head coach of the Ohio State University baseball program. In 23 seasons there his teams compiled a 901–477–2 record. He previously coached Kent State to a 124–82 record. He has guided Ohio State to two 50-win seasons, in 1991 and 1999. His teams won the Big Ten championship five consecutive years (1991–1995). He announced his retirement at the end of the 2010 season.

== Awards and honors ==
- Big Ten Coach of the Year (1989, 1994, 1999, 2001)
- National Coach of the Year (1994)
