= Michigan State Spartans baseball =

Baseball team of Michigan State University

Michigan State Spartans
- 2026 Michigan State Spartans baseball team
- Founded: 1884
- University: Michigan State University
- Head coach: Jake Boss (18th season)
- Conference: Big Ten
- Location: East Lansing, Michigan
- Home stadium: Jeff Ishbia Field at McLane Stadium (capacity: 4,000)
- Nickname: Spartans
- Colors: Green and white

College World Series appearances
- 1954

NCAA tournament appearances
- 1954, 1971, 1978, 1979, 2012

Conference regular season champions
- Big Ten: 1954, 1971, 1979, 2011; MIAA: 1888, 1889, 1893, 1894, 1902

The Michigan State Spartans baseball team is the varsity intercollegiate baseball team of Michigan State University in East Lansing, Michigan, United States. The team competes in the National Collegiate Athletic Association's Division I and are members of the Big Ten Conference.

Beginning play in 1884, the Spartans have made the NCAA Division I Baseball Championship 5 times, advancing to the College World Series once, in 1954, with a third-place finish. The team has won 4 Big Ten conference championships and 5 Michigan Intercollegiate Athletic Association titles. The team played in the MIAA until 1907 and played as an independent until the university joined the Big Ten in 1949 and the Spartan baseball team began Big Ten play in 1951.

== Spartan baseball Hall of Famer ==
Robin Roberts initially came to East Lansing as part of a United States Army Air Corps training program in 1944. After the war ended in 1945, he took his leave of the service and returned to MSC (the name was Michigan State College at the time) to play basketball. Roberts was twice named captain, earning three varsity letters in basketball. After his second season playing basketball, Roberts tried out for the Michigan State baseball team, becoming a pitcher because it was the position that coach John Kobs needed most. After playing for Michigan State, going 9–6 over two seasons, with 6 shutouts in the 1946 season, he was signed by the Philadelphia Phillies in 1948. Roberts would go on to win 286 games, with 7 Major League Baseball All-Star Game appearances in a 19-year Major League Baseball career. Roberts was inducted into the Hall of Fame in 1976.

In 1992, Roberts was one of 30 members of the charter class of former Michigan State Spartans athletes, coaches, and administrators inducted into the MSU Athletics Hall of Fame. His number 36 is retired, one of only five Spartan baseball players to receive the honor. He kept the number 36 as a Philadelphia Phillies' pitcher and that team has also retired his number.

== Other notable Spartans ==
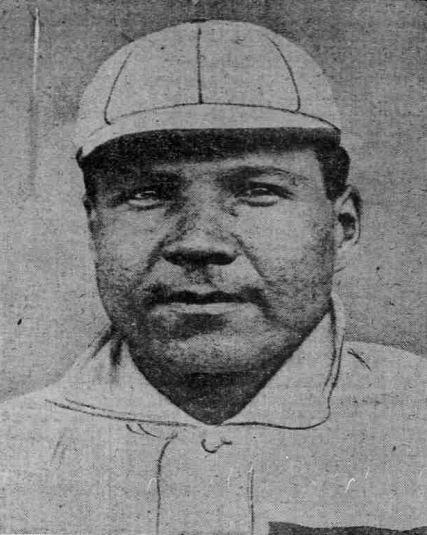
Ed "Peanuts" Pinnance

Ed Pinnance made history for Michigan State baseball as the first Spartan (the school was called State Agricultural College at the time with the nickname Aggies) to advance to the major leagues, appearing in 1903 for the Philadelphia Athletics, and was also among the first full-blooded Native Americans to play in MLB. Tom Yewcic was named the College World Series Most Outstanding Player of the 1954 College World Series despite his team not reaching the championship game and would have a brief professional career with the Detroit Tigers. Yewcic was a two-sport star at Michigan State, leading the 1953 football team to a Rose Bowl win. Earl Morrall was a teammates of Yewcic on the 1954 College World Series team, led the 1955 football team to a Rose Bowl victory, and chose a career in the National Football League where he won 4 Super Bowls and an NFL MVP trophy in a 21-year career. Dick Radatz earned first-time All Big Ten honors in 1959, going 10–1, 1.12 ERA, and was a two-time MLB All-Star with the Boston Red Sox in 7-year pro career. A teammate of Radatz, Ron Perranoski would leave a stellar collegiate career in East Lansing for an MLB career, twice leading the league in saves, and twice helping his team win the World Series in his 13-year stint in the majors.

The Major League Baseball draft began in 1965 and the Spartans would be represented in the first year when Dick Billings was drafted in the 25th round by the Washington Senators as the first Michigan State player ever drafted. Billings would go on to an 8-year MLB career. Steve Garvey was a two-sport athlete at Michigan State, earning a letter as a defensive back for the football team, and would earn All Big Ten and All American honors in 1968 on his way to the majors where he would earn a World Series ring with the Los Angeles Dodgers as a 10-time MLB All-Star. Rick Miller was a Sporting News First Team All-American in 1969 for Michigan State and then won a Gold Glove for the California Angels in 1978 in his 15-year MLB career as a defensive standout.

In 1974, Spartan coach Danny Litwhiler pioneered the use of radar to measure pitching velocity. Litwiler said, “One day in 1974 while I was the coach at Michigan State, I read an article in the student paper that said ‘Don’t Speed on Campus’ and there was a photo of an MSU policeman who had just received a new radar gun. That got me thinking—could we use it to check the velocity of the baseball? So I found out that the cops’ radar guns were powered by the cigarette lighters in their police cars. So, we got an MSU police car to drive out on the field to time the pitches and the readouts were accurate within one mph each time. Within one week, I had the prototype of the JUGS gun in my hands and today that same prototype is in the Hall of Fame." Litwhiler also invented 'Diamond Grit' to help dry out fields after rain.

Following the two-sport tradition, Kirk Gibson would lead the 1978 Michigan State Spartans football team to a co-Big Ten championship. At the suggestion of Spartan football coach Darryl Rogers, Gibson also played collegiate baseball. Gibson played only one year of college baseball, hitting .390 with 16 homers and 52 RBIs in 48 games. He was drafted by both his hometown Detroit Tigers baseball team (first round) and the St. Louis Cardinals football team (seventh round). He chose baseball and won two World Series titles (1984 with Detroit, 1988 with the Los Angeles Dodgers) and the 1988 National League MVP award in his 17-year career.

Mark Mulder would earn All Big Ten honors twice for the Spartans (1997, 1998) on his way to a professional career with two MLB All-Star appearances and a 21–8 2001 season for the Oakland Athletics which was captured in the book and film Moneyball. Bob Malek (2002) and Jeff Holm (2011) both were named the Big Ten Conference Baseball Player of the Year, the only two Spartans honored since the award was created in 1982. Malek finished his career as one of the most decorated Spartans ever with several national awards and is only the second Spartan in history to be a two-time member (2001-2002) of the .400 club (.400 or better batting average), joining Don Fleser, who did so in 1925-1926. Kurt Wunderlich was the Big Ten Pitcher of the Year in 2011, and Joseph Dzierwa won the award in 2025, the only two Spartan hurlers to be so recognized since the award was created in 1994. Second baseman Ryan Jones was named to the All-Big Ten team three consecutive seasons (2010–2012) and had a 33-game hitting streak, a Spartan record.

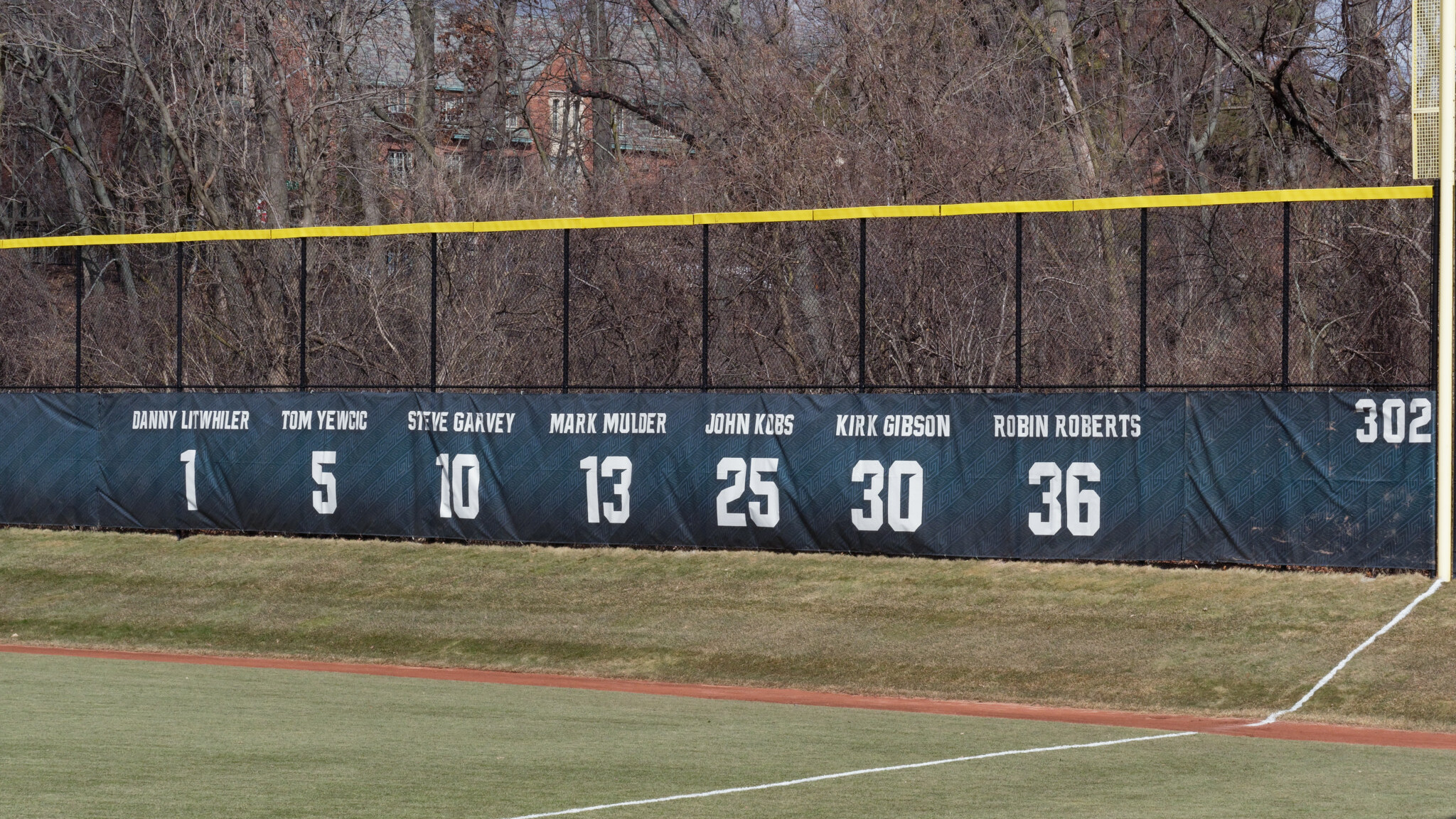
Retired numbers on the outfield fence in 2018

Recognizing the combination of athletic and academic performance, a number of Spartan baseball players have won the prestigious Big Ten Medal of Honor, including Ty Willingham (1977), who would go on to a successful college football coaching career at Notre Dame and Stanford. Other winners from Spartan baseball are Mike Davidson (1988), Stuart Hirschman (1992), Brandon Eckerle (2011) and Bryce Kelley (2021).

Five Spartan players (Roberts, Garvey, Yewcic, Gibson, Mulder) and two coaches (John Kobs and Danny Litwhiler), have their numbers retired in East Lansing. In addition, the stadium is named after Drayton McLane, a Michigan State alumnus and former owner of the Houston Astros. McLane and his wife Elizabeth donated funds to begin renovations of the stadium, located at the historic Old College Field, and the updated facility quickly made history when, on April 4, 2009, the first official game in the new stadium was played, and Spartan pitcher Nolan Moody threw a no-hitter against Northwestern. McLane donated funds for the building of the football facility at Baylor University, also named McLane Stadium. The baseball field was named for Spartan coach John Kobs in 1969.

== Year-by-year results ==
Year	Coach	Overall record	Conference record	Notes
1884	No Coach	4–2		
1885	No Coach	1–1		
1886	No Coach	5–3		
1887	R. Carpnter	11–5		
1888	R. Carpnter	5–3		
1889	No Coach	4–7		
1890	No Coach	3–5		
1891	No Coach	5–3		
1892	No Coach	3–1		
1893	No Coach	2–2		
1894	No Coach	3–2–1		
1895	No Coach	4–5		
1896	Robert T. Gale	3–9		
1897	Robert T. Gale	4–6		
1898	Robert T. Gale	6–5–1		
1899	Charles Ferguson	5–4		
1900	Charles Bemies	3–6		
1901	Charles Bemies	1–5		
1902	George Denman	1–9–1		
1903	George Denman	8–6		
1904	Chester Brewer	11–4		
1905	Chester Brewer	11–4		
1906	Chester Brewer	11–9		
1907	Chester Brewer	4–8		
1908	Chester Brewer	7–5–1		
1909	Chester Brewer	9–3		
1910	Chester Brewer	8–6		
1911	John Macklin	11–5		
1912	John Macklin	11–3		
1913	John Macklin	11–7		
1914	John Macklin	12–6		
1915	John Macklin	8–6		
1916	John Morrissey	11–4		
1917	John Morrissey	6–5		
1918	Chester Brewer	7–5		
1919	Chester Brewer	4–9		
1920	Chester Brewer	6–9		
1921	George Clark	6–8		
1922	John Morrissey	7–10		
1923	Mysterious Walker	14–4		
1924	Mysterious Walker	6–7		
1925	John Kobs	9–5–1		
1926	John Kobs	13–7		
1927	John Kobs	13–8		
1928	John Kobs	11–7		
1929	John Kobs	12–11–1		
1930	John Kobs	18–6		
1931	John Kobs	13–9–1		
1932	John Kobs	10–12–2		
1933	John Kobs	13–7		
1934	John Kobs	10–11–1		
1935	John Kobs	11–9–1		
1936	John Kobs	13–7		
1937	John Kobs	16–11		
1938	John Kobs	15–9		
1939	John Kobs	13–10		
1940	John Kobs	12–8–2		
1941	John Kobs	13–10		
1942	John Kobs	13–11–1		
1943	John Kobs	9–7		
1944	John Kobs	No team because of World War II		
1945	John Kobs	12–4		
1946	John Kobs	21–5		
1947	John Kobs	16–8		
1948	John Kobs	10–14–1		
1949	John Kobs	19–8–1		
1950	John Kobs	19–9		CWS District 4 Tournaments
1951	John Kobs	17–9	4–6; 7th	
1952	John Kobs	18–14	7–6; 5th	
1953	John Kobs	11–17	6–7; 7th	
1954	John Kobs	25–10–1	11–2; 1st	NCAA Tournament / College World Series
1955	John Kobs	21–11	10–5; T-2nd	
1956	John Kobs	16–13	4–7; 8th	
1957	John Kobs	18–13–1	5–6; 7th	
1958	John Kobs	22–12	10–5; 2nd	
1959	John Kobs	21–14	8–7; T-5th	
1960	John Kobs	17–13	4–7; 8th	
1961	John Kobs	21–11–1	6–8; 5th	
1962	John Kobs	17–13	6–8; 4th	
1963	John Kobs	18–14–1	5–9; 8th	
1964	Danny Litwhiler	22–12	8–7; T-4th	
1965	Danny Litwhiler	28–11	9–6; 3rd	
1966	Danny Litwhiler	24–13–1	8–5; 4th	
1967	Danny Litwhiler	22–23–1	8–10; 6th	
1968	Danny Litwhiler	32–10–1	13–4; 2nd	
1969	Danny Litwhiler	24–17	8–8; 6th	
1970	Danny Litwhiler	28–15–2	9–7; 3rd	
1971	Danny Litwhiler	36–10	13–3; 1st	NCAA Tournament District 4
1972	Danny Litwhiler	28–10–1	10–4; 2nd	
1973	Danny Litwhiler	27–20	9–8; 5th	
1974	Danny Litwhiler	23–16–1	7–8; 6th	
1975	Danny Litwhiler	28–16	11–4; 6th	
1976	Danny Litwhiler	15–23–1	7–5; 4th	
1977	Danny Litwhiler	28–26	10–8; 5th	
1978	Danny Litwhiler	33–21	11–5; 2nd	NCAA Tournament Midwest Regional
1979	Danny Litwhiler	28–27	11–4; 1st	NCAA Tournament Mideast Regional
1980	Danny Litwhiler	15–35	3–13; 10th	
1981	Danny Litwhiler	23–28	6–8; 4th West	
1982	Danny Litwhiler	25–29	6–10; 4th West	
1983	Tom Smith	22–32	8–6; 2nd West	Big Ten Tournament
1984	Tom Smith	32–26	8–7; 2nd West	Big Ten Tournament
1985	Tom Smith	22–35	2–14; 5th West	
1986	Tom Smith	28–26–1	7–9; 4th West	
1987	Tom Smith	34–20	6–10; 4th West	
1988	Tom Smith	41–20	16–12; 3rd	Big Ten Tournament
1989	Tom Smith	25–26	13–15; 7th	
1990	Tom Smith	28–24	13–15; 7th	
1991	Tom Smith	28–25–1	12–16; 8th	
1992	Tom Smith	36–19	17–11; 3rd	Big Ten Tournament
1993	Tom Smith	31–23	12–16; 8th	
1994	Tom Smith	26–29	13–15; 4th	Big Ten Tournament
1995	Tom Smith	24–27	12–16; 9th	
1996	Ted Mahan	14–41	4–24; 10th	
1997	Ted Mahan	26–28	12–16; 7th	
1998	Ted Mahan	25–27	8–16; 10th	
1999	Ted Mahan	28–25	10–17; 7th	
2000	Ted Mahan	20–36	9–18; 9th	
2001	Ted Mahan	29–27	9–17; 8th	
2002	Ted Mahan	38–19	16–12; 3rd	Big Ten Tournament
2003	Ted Mahan	21–34	10–19; 9th	
2004	Ted Mahan	33–26	19–13; 4th	Big Ten Tournament
2005	Ted Mahan	22–31	10–18; 9th	
2006	David Grewe	26–30	13–19; 7th	
2007	David Grewe	25–26	15–16; 7th	
2008	David Grewe	24–29	12–18; 8th	
2009	Jake Boss	23–31	13–11; 5th	Big Ten Tournament
2010	Jake Boss	34–19	11–13; T-7th	
2011	Jake Boss	36–21	15–9; T-1st	Big Ten Tournament
2012	Jake Boss	37–23	13–11; 5th	Big Ten Tournament / NCAA Tournament Tallahassee Super Regional
2013	Jake Boss	33–17	12–9; 7th	
2014	Jake Boss	31–26	11–13; 6th	Big Ten Tournament
2015	Jake Boss	34–23	14–10; T-3rd	Big Ten Tournament
2016	Jake Boss	36–20	13–11; T-6th	Big Ten Tournament
2017	Jake Boss	29–23	10–14; 9th	
2018	Jake Boss	20–32	11–12; 8th	Big Ten Tournament
2019	Jake Boss	20–34	8–15; 11th	
2020	Jake Boss	9–6	0–0	Season cancelled due to COVID-19 pandemic
2021	Jake Boss	17–27	17–27; 11th	
2022	Jake Boss	24–30	8–16; 12th	
2023	Jake Boss	33–22	12–12; 8th	Big Ten Tournament
2024	Jake Boss	24–27	11–13; T-9th	
2025	Jake Boss	28–27	13–17; 12th	Big Ten Tournament
2026	Jake Boss	24–32	11–19; T-12th	Big Ten Tournament

== Postseason results ==
=== Michigan State in the NCAA tournament ===
Year	Opponents	Record	Results
1954	Missouri, Ohio, UMass, Arizona, Rollins	3–2	Lost College World Series Preliminary Final
1971	Ohio, Cincinnati	0–2	Lost Lower round one Quarterfinals
1978	Oklahoma State, Southern Illinois	0–2	Lost Quarterfinals
1979	San Diego State, Pepperdine, Miami University	1–2	Lost Regional semi-finals
2012	Fresno State, Pepperdine	0–2	Lost Regional

=== Michigan State in the Big Ten tournament ===
Year	Opponents	Record	Results	Finish
1983	Minnesota; Iowa	0–2	L 1–14; L 2–6	Lower Round 1
1984	Minnesota; Northwestern	0–2	L 7–8; L 4–9	Lower Round 1
1988	Minnesota; Michigan; Minnesota	2–2	W 10–5; W 4–1; L 4–17^{Game 1} L 3–5^{Game 2}	Runner–up
1992	Minnesota; Ohio State; Illinois; Minnesota	2–2	L 0–5; W 10–5; W 4–2; L 5–11	Runner–up
1994	Ohio State; Michigan	2–2	L 5–12; L 1–5	Lower Round 1
2002	Northwestern; Iowa; Indiana; Minnesota	2–2	L 2–4; W 13–9; W 14–1; L 0–6	Lower Round 3
2004	Purdue; Penn State; Ohio State	1–2	L 5–6; W 8–7; L 3–8	Lower Round 2
2009	Illinois; Purdue	0–2	L 5–16; L 9–12	Lower Round 1
2011	Purdue; Illinois; Minnesota; Illinois	2–2	W 7–1; L 1–4; W 6–3; L 1–9	Runner–up
2012	Nebraska; Indiana; Ohio State; Indiana	2–2	W 10–9; L 4–6; W 6–2; L 3–4^{(11)}	Lower Final
2014	Illinois; Nebraska; Illinois; Indiana	2–2	W 2–1; L 2–3; W 11–2; L 4–7	Semifinals
2015	Nebraska; Illinois; Maryland	1–2	W 9–7; L 0–2; L 1–2	First Round
2016	Nebraska; Maryland; Ohio State	2–2	W 5–1; W 4–3; L 2–3^{Game 1} L 3–7 ^{Game 2}	Semifinals
2018	Indiana; Minnesota	0–2	L 5–6^{(10)} L 2–3	First Round
2023	Maryland; Rutgers; Nebraska	1–2	L 2–3; W 6–4; L 0–4	Lower Final
2025	Nebraska; Oregon	0–2	L 4–5^{(10)} L 2–4	3rd in Pool A
2026	Purdue; Iowa; USC	2–1	W 8–4; W 4–3; L 0–7	Quarterfinals

== Big Ten Conference Championships ==
Year	Conference	Record	Coach	All Big Ten First-Team Players
1954	Big Ten	25–10–1	John Kobs	Chuck Mathews, Jack Risch, Tom Yewcic
1971	Big Ten	36–10	Danny Litwhiler	Rob Clancy, Rob Ellis, Ron Pruitt
1979	Big Ten	28–27	Danny Litwhiler	Chris Dorr
2011	Big Ten	36–21	Jake Boss	Brandon Eckerle, Jeff Holm, Ryan Jones, Torsten Boss, Kurt Wunderlich, Tony Bucciferro

== College Baseball All-Americans ==
Player	Position	Year(s)	Team, Selector(s)
Jack Kinney	Outfielder	1949	Second Team ABCA
George Rutenbar	Outfielder	1949	Third Team ABCA
Albert Cummins	Second Base	1950	Second Team ABCA
Darrell Lindley	Outfielder	1951	Third Team ABCA
Jack Risch	Outfielder	1954	Second Team ABCA
Tom Yewcic	Catcher	1954	First Team ABCA
Bob Powell	Outfielder	1955	Second Team ABCA
George Smith	Second Base	1955	Third Team ABCA
Jim Sack	Outfielder	1956	Second Team ABCA
Dick Radatz	Pitcher	1959	Second Team ABCA
Tom Riley	Outfielder	1961	Second Team ABCA
Jerry Sutton	First Base	1963	Third Team,ABCA
John Biedenbach	Third Base	1965	Second Team ABCA
Steve Garvey	Third Base	1968	Second Team ABCA; First Team SN
Harry Kendrick	Catcher	1969	First Team SN
Rick Miller	Outfielder	1969	Third Team,ABCA; First Team SN
Rob Ellis	Outfielder	1971	First Team ABCA
Ron Pruitt	Catcher	1972	First Team ABCA; First Team SN
Dale Frietch	Designated Hitter	1974	Third Team ABCA
Joe Palamara	Second Base	1975	Second Team ABCA
Al Weston	Outfielder	1976-77	Third Team 1976 ABCA; First Team 1977 ABCA
Kirk Gibson	Outfielder	1978	First Team ABCA
Mike Eddington	Designated Hitter	1984	Third Team ABCA
Mike Davidson	Outfielder	1988	Third Team ABCA
Scott Ayotte	Outfielder	1995	Third Team ABCA
Mark Mulder	Pitcher	1998	Third Team ABCA; Third Team CB
Bob Malek	Outfielder	2001-2002	Third Team 2001 ABCA; First Team 2002 ABCA; First Team 2002 CB; Third Team 2002 NCBWA
Jeff Holm	First Base	2011	Third Team ABCA; Third Team CB
Blaise Salter	Outfielder	2014	Third Team NCBWA
Dakota Mekkes	Pitcher	2015	Third Team NCBWA
Mason Erla	Pitcher	2020	Second Team CB
Brock Vradenburg	Outfielder	2023	Third Team CB, Third Team NCBWA
Joseph Dzierwa	Pitcher	2025	First Team ABCA, Second Team NCBWA
Source: ABCA: American Baseball Coaches Association CB: Collegiate Baseball NCBWA: National Collegiate Baseball Writers Association SN: Sporting News

== Head coaches ==
Year(s)	Coach	Seasons	W–L–T	Pct
1884–1886	No coach	3	10–6	.625
1887–1888	R. Carpenter	2	16–8	.667
1889–1895	No coach	7	24–25–1	.490
1896–1898	Robert T. Gale	3	13–20–1	.397
1899	Charles Ferguson	1	5–4	.556
1900–1901	Charles Bemies	2	4–11	.267
1902–1903	George Denman	2	9–15–1	.380
1904–1910, 1918–1920	Chester Brewer	10	78–62–1	.557
1911–1915	John Macklin	5	53–27	.663
1916–1917, 1922	John Morrissey	3	25–18	.581
1921	George Clark	1	6–8	.429
1923–1924	Mysterious Walker	2	20–11	.645
1925–1963	John Kobs	39	576–377–16	.603
1964–1982	Danny Litwhiler	19	489–362–8	.574
1983–1995	Tom Smith	13	377–332–2	.532
1996–2005	Ted Mahan	10	256–294	.465
2006–2008	David Grewe	3	75–85	.469
2009–present	Jake Boss	14	440–381	.536
