= Northwestern Wildcats baseball =

- 2026 Northwestern Wildcats baseball team
- Founded: 1869; 157 years ago
- University: Northwestern University
- Head coach: Ben Greenspan (3rd season)
- Conference: Big Ten
- Location: Evanston, Illinois
- Home stadium: Rocky Miller Park (capacity: 600)
- Nickname: Wildcats
- Colors: Purple and white

NCAA tournament appearances
- 1957

Conference regular season champions
- 1940, 1957

The Northwestern Wildcats baseball team is the varsity intercollegiate athletic team of the Northwestern University in Evanston, Illinois, United States. The team competes in the National Collegiate Athletic Association's Division I and are members of the Big Ten Conference.

The Wildcats have been to one NCAA tournament, in 1957. In 2017, the Wildcats made it to the Big Ten Conference Baseball Tournament championship.

== Stadiums ==
=== Rocky and Berenice Miller Park ===
Rocky and Berenice Miller Park is a baseball stadium in Evanston. It has been the Wildcats' home stadium since 1943. The stadium is named after J. Roscoe Miller, Northwestern president from 1949 to 1970, and his wife. In 2013, Miller's daughter, Roxy, and her husband Richard Pepper, donated to renovate the stadium.

== Head coaches ==
Year(s)	Coach	Seasons	W–L–T	Pct
1888	Billy Sunday	1	6–4	.600
1894–1897	John Kedzie	4	38–22	.633
1898–1902	W. J. Bryan	5	30–53	.361
1903	Horace Butterworth	1	3–13	.188
1904	Harry Fleager	1	1–11	.083
1905	Harley Parker	1	7–9	.438
1906	Charles M. Hollister	1	3–7	.300
1907–1908	A. B. Cunningham	2	4–14	.222
1909–1911	A. G. Rundle	3	4–25	.138
1912	L. C. Holsinger	1	3–6–1	.350
1913	Dennis Grady	1	6–6	.500
1914–1916	Fred J. Murphy	3	11–17–1	.397
1917	Willie McGill	1	4–4	.500
1921	Jack Sawtelle	1	6–10	.375
1922	Henry Symanski	1	2–8	.200
1923–1928, 1942–1943	Maury Kent	8	33–78–1	.299
1929–1935	Paul Stewart	7	60–75	.444
1936–1939	Burt Ingwersen	4	35–51	.407
1940–1941	Stan Klores	2	25–24	.510
1944–1946	Wesley Fry	3	28–28–1	.500
1947–1948	Don Heap	2	21–25–1	.457
1949–1961	Freddie Lindstrom	13	163–145–2	.529
1962–1981	George McKinnon	20	304–391–6	.438
1982–1986	Ron Wellman	5	180–97–4	.648
1987	Larry Cochell	1	23–20–1	.613
1988–2015	Paul Stevens	28	674–836–6	.447
2016–2021	Spencer Allen	6	101–152	.399
2022	Josh Reynolds	1	24–27	.471
2023	Jim Foster	1	10–40	.200
2024–present	Ben Greenspan	1	18–34	.346
Totals	30	128	1,827–2,232–24	.450

== NCAA tournament ==
Northwestern has made the NCAA Division I baseball tournament once.

Year	Region	Round	Opponent	Result
1957	District 4	Upper Round 1 Lower Round; Lower Final; Finals Game 1 Finals Game 2	Western Michigan; Alma; Western Michigan; Notre Dame	L 1–11; W 11–2; W 10–9 (10); W 9–2; L 1–6

== Player awards ==
=== First-team All-Americans ===
The following is a listing of the selections listed in the 2025 Northwestern Baseball media guide.

- 1979

Bill Dierberger – American Baseball Coaches Association (ABCA)

- 1985

Joe Girardi (C) – ABCA

- 1986

Grady Hall – ABCA

- 1993

Mark Loretta (SS) – ABCA

- 2000

Jeremy Kurella (SS) – ABCA

=== Big Ten award winners ===
- Player of the Year Award

Mark Loretta (1993)

- Pitcher of the Year

Chad Schroeder (1995)
Dan Brauer (2006)

- Freshman of the Year Award

Keith Batchelder (1997)
Eric Jokisch (2008)

== See also ==
- Northwestern Wildcats baseball players, a list of notable players
