= 2025 Michigan Wolverines baseball team =

College baseball team season

2025 Michigan Wolverines baseball
- Conference: Big Ten Conference
- Record: 33–23 (16–14 Big Ten)
- Head coach: Tracy Smith (3rd season)
- Assistant coaches: Jake Valentine (2nd season); Ty Neal (1st season)
- Hitting coach: Tyler Graham (3rd season)
- Pitching coach: Brock Huntzinger (3rd season)
- Home stadium: Wilpon Baseball Complex

2025 Big Ten Conference baseball standings
	Conf.						Overall
Team	W		L		T	PCT	W		L		T	PCT
No. 5 Oregon ‍†‍‍^{y}	22	–	8	–	0	.733	42	–	16	–	0	.724
No. 13 UCLA ‍†‍‍^{y}	22	–	8	–	0	.733	48	–	16	–	0	.750
Iowa ‍‍‍	21	–	9	–	0	.700	33	–	22	–	1	.598
USC ‍‍‍^{y}	18	–	12	–	0	.600	37	–	23	–	0	.617
Washington ‍‍‍	17	–	13	–	0	.567	29	–	28	–	0	.509
Indiana ‍‍‍	16	–	14	–	0	.533	32	–	24	–	0	.571
Michigan ‍‍‍	16	–	14	–	0	.533	33	–	23	–	0	.589
Nebraska ‍‍‡‍^{y}	15	–	15	–	0	.500	33	–	29	–	0	.532
Penn State ‍‍‍	15	–	15	–	0	.500	33	–	23	–	0	.589
Rutgers ‍‍‍	15	–	15	–	0	.500	29	–	28	–	0	.509
Illinois ‍‍‍	14	–	16	–	0	.467	30	–	24	–	0	.556
Michigan State ‍‍‍	13	–	17	–	0	.433	28	–	27	–	0	.509
Northwestern ‍‍‍	13	–	17	–	0	.433	25	–	27	–	0	.481
Maryland ‍‍‍	12	–	18	–	0	.400	27	–	29	–	0	.482
Purdue ‍‍‍	11	–	19	–	0	.367	31	–	23	–	0	.574
Minnesota ‍‍‍	10	–	20	–	0	.333	24	–	28	–	0	.462
Ohio State ‍‍‍	5	–	25	–	0	.167	13	–	37	–	0	.260
† – Conference champion ‡ – Tournament champion y – Invited to the NCAA tournament As of June 2, 2025; Rankings from D1Baseball

The 2025 Michigan Wolverines baseball team represented the University of Michigan in the 2025 NCAA Division I baseball season. The Wolverines were led by head coach Tracy Smith in his third season, were a member of the Big Ten Conference and played their home games at Wilpon Baseball Complex in Ann Arbor, Michigan.

== Previous season ==
The Wolverines finished the 2024 season 32–28, including 14–10 in conference play, finishing tied for fourth place in their conference. Following the conclusion of the regular season, the Wolverines reached the semifinals of the 2024 Big Ten baseball tournament, and did not receive a bid to the 2024 NCAA Division I baseball tournament.

== Roster ==
2025 Michigan Wolverines baseball team
Players
Coaches

#	Pos.	Name	B/T	Height	Weight	Year	Previous school	Home town
0	OF	A. J. Rausch	R/R	5 ft 11 in (1.8 m)	195 lb (88 kg)	Gr	Olentangy Liberty	Powell, Ohio
2	INF	Cole Caruso	R/R	6 ft 3 in (1.91 m)	216 lb (98 kg)	Sr	Cactus Shadows	Scottsdale, Arizona
3	OF	Greg Pace Jr.	R/R	6 ft 3 in (1.91 m)	195 lb (88 kg)	Jr	Edison Academy	Southfield, Michigan
4	C	Noah Miller	R/R	6 ft 0 in (1.83 m)	200 lb (91 kg)	So	Monroe	Monroe, Michigan
5	RHP	David Lally Jr.	R/R	6 ft 5 in (1.96 m)	215 lb (98 kg)	Jr	Grand Blanc	Grand Blanc, Michigan
6	RHP	Kurt Barr	R/R	6 ft 3 in (1.91 m)	190 lb (86 kg)	Jr	University Liggett	Saint Joachim, Ontario
7	OF	Joe Longo	R/R	6 ft 0 in (1.83 m)	215 lb (98 kg)	Sr	Holy Angels	Apple Valley, Minnesota
8	INF	Benjamin Casillas	R/R	6 ft 1 in (1.85 m)	180 lb (82 kg)	Gr	El Segundo	Culver City, California
9	OF	Robert Hamchuk	R/R	6 ft 1 in (1.85 m)	203 lb (92 kg)	Gr	Leigh	San Jose, California
10	RHP	Tate Carey	R/R	6 ft 0 in (1.83 m)	209 lb (95 kg)	Fr	Riverside Secondary School	Windsor, Ontario
12	RHP	Max Debiec	R/R	6 ft 7 in (2.01 m)	218 lb (99 kg)	Jr	O'Dea	Seattle, Washington
14	INF	Colby Turner	R/R	6 ft 0 in (1.83 m)	205 lb (93 kg)	So	Huntington Beach	Huntington Beach, California
15	OF	Tyler Inge	R/R	6 ft 0 in (1.83 m)	175 lb (79 kg)	Fr	Detroit Country Day	Brighton, Michigan
17	RHP	Gavin DeVooght	R/R	6 ft 5 in (1.96 m)	238 lb (108 kg)	So	Walled Lake Central	Walled Lake, Michigan
18	OF	AJ Garcia	L/L	5 ft 10 in (1.78 m)	173 lb (78 kg)	So	DePaul College Prep	Chicago, Illinois
19	RHP	Brandon Mann	R/R	6 ft 3 in (1.91 m)	247 lb (112 kg)	Jr	Detroit Country Day	Franklin, Michigan
20	RHP	Ricky Kidd	R/R	6 ft 1 in (1.85 m)	193 lb (88 kg)	Sr	Trenton	Trenton, Michigan
21	OF	Jonathan Kim	L/L	5 ft 11 in (1.8 m)	190 lb (86 kg)	Jr	Brookfield Academy	Brookfield, Wisconsin
22	LHP	Wyatt Novara	L/L	6 ft 3 in (1.91 m)	200 lb (91 kg)	So	Dexter	Dexter, Michigan
23	RHP	Will Rogers	R/R	6 ft 1 in (1.85 m)	205 lb (93 kg)	Sr	Mounds View	Shoreview, Minnesota
24	INF	Brayden Jefferis	L/R	5 ft 10 in (1.78 m)	175 lb (79 kg)	Fr	Hart	Valencia, California
25	C	Brock Leitgeb	R/R	6 ft 0 in (1.83 m)	200 lb (91 kg)	So	Jesuit	Portland, Oregon
26	INF	Jeter Ybarra	L/R	6 ft 4 in (1.93 m)	205 lb (93 kg)	Gr	Saint Francis	San Jose, California
27	RHP	Dylan Vigue	R/R	6 ft 3 in (1.91 m)	219 lb (99 kg)	So	Groton School	Leominster, Massachusetts
28	INF	Cade Ladehoff	R/R	5 ft 10 in (1.78 m)	200 lb (91 kg)	So	IMG Academy	Bradenton, Florida
29	OF	Keegan O'Hearn	L/L	6 ft 5 in (1.96 m)	225 lb (102 kg)	So	O'Neill CVI	Oshawa, Ontario
30	C	Matt Spear	L/R	6 ft 2 in (1.88 m)	210 lb (95 kg)	Gr	Woodbridge	San Clemente, California
32	LHP	Cade Connelly	L/L	6 ft 3 in (1.91 m)	202 lb (92 kg)	Gr	Santa Margarita Catholic	Austin, Texas
34	LHP	Michael Quedens	L/L	6 ft 1 in (1.85 m)	192 lb (87 kg)	Fr	St. Mary's	Stockton, California
35	OF	Alfredo Velazquez	L/L	5 ft 8 in (1.73 m)	170 lb (77 kg)	So	Brother Rice	Melvindale, Michigan
36	INF	Brady Schrank	R/R	6 ft 1 in (1.85 m)	193 lb (88 kg)	RS So	Foothill	Orange, California
37	RHP	Josh Kasner	R/R	6 ft 1 in (1.85 m)	200 lb (91 kg)	Fr	Algonac	Algonac, Michigan
39	OF	Bradley Navarro	R/R	5 ft 11 in (1.8 m)	183 lb (83 kg)	So	Huntington Beach	Huntington Beach, California
40	INF	Cooper Mullens	R/R	5 ft 7 in (1.7 m)	155 lb (70 kg)	So	Marist Catholic	Eugene, Oregon
41	RHP	Grant Bradley	R/R	6 ft 3 in (1.91 m)	205 lb (93 kg)	Fr	Napoleon	Brooklyn, Michigan
42	RHP	Justin Brown	R/R	6 ft 3 in (1.91 m)	198 lb (90 kg)	Fr	Northville	Northville, Michigan
43	LHP	Gideon Motes	S/L	6 ft 2 in (1.88 m)	205 lb (93 kg)	Fr	Bryant	Bryant, Arkansas
45	RHP	Preston Barr	R/R	6 ft 3 in (1.91 m)	210 lb (95 kg)	Fr	University Liggett	Grosse Pointe Woods, Michigan
47	LHP	Brennan Hill	L/L	6 ft 4 in (1.93 m)	201 lb (91 kg)	Fr	Grosse Pointe North	Grosse Pointe Woods, Michigan
48	RHP	Brandon Newland	R/R	6 ft 5 in (1.96 m)	200 lb (91 kg)	Fr	Bloomfield Hills	Bloomfield Hills, Michigan
49	RHP	Erik Puodziunas	R/R	6 ft 3 in (1.91 m)	190 lb (86 kg)	Fr	Notre Dame	Sherman Oaks, California
50	OF	Johnny Backus	L/R	6 ft 5 in (1.96 m)	225 lb (102 kg)	Fr	Westlake	Westlake Village, California
51	INF	Joonsung Park	R/R	6 ft 0 in (1.83 m)	193 lb (88 kg)	So	IMG Academy	Seoul, South Korea
55	INF	Mitch Voit	R/R	6 ft 0 in (1.83 m)	201 lb (91 kg)	Jr	Whitefish Bay	Whitefish Bay, Wisconsin

Head coach

Tracy Smith

Assistant coach(es)

Jake Valentine
Ty Neal

Hitting coach(es)

Tyler Graham

Pitching coach(es)

Brock Huntzinger

Legend

- (C) Team captain
- (S) Suspended
- (I) Ineligible
- Injured
- Current redshirt

Roster
Last update: November 21, 2024

== Schedule and results ==
2025 Michigan Wolverines baseball game log (33–23)
Regular season (33–21)

February (4–4)
#	Date	Opponent	Rank	Site/stadium	Score	Win	Loss	Save	Attendance	Overall Record	B1G Record
1	February 14	vs. No. 2 Virginia; Puerto Rico Challenge		Estadio Francisco Montaner; Ponce, PR	5–4 ^{(11)}	**DeVooght** (1–0)	Osinski (0–1)	–	450	1–0	–
2	February 15	vs. Rice; Puerto Rico Challenge		Estadio Francisco Montaner	5–2	**Kasner** (1–0)	Vincent (0–1)	–	644	2–0	–
3	February 16	vs. Villanova; Puerto Rico Challenge		Estadio Francisco Montaner	19–0	**Lally Jr.** (1–0)	Podgorski (0–1)	–	0	3–0	–
4	February 17	vs. Stetson; Puerto Rico Challenge		Parque Yldefonso Solá Morales; Caguas, PR	6–1	**DeVooght** (2–0)	Davenport (0–1)	**Rogers** (1)	0	4–0	–
5	February 21	vs. No. 22 TCU; College Baseball Series		Globe Life Field; Arlington, TX	4–10	Parker (1–0)	**Connolly** (0–1)	Sloan (1)	0	4–1	–
6	February 22	vs. Kansas State; College Baseball Series		Globe Life Field	1–5	Lewis (1–0)	**K. Barr** (0–1)	–	0	4–2	–
7	February 23	vs. No. 5 Arkansas; College Baseball Series		Globe Life Field	6–8	Carter (2–0)	**DeVooght** (2–1)	McGuire (1)	0	4–3	–
8	February 28	at Long Beach State		Blair Field; Long Beach, CA	3–6	Montgomery (3–0)	**DeVooght** (2–2)	Geiss (1)	2,367	4–4	–

March (11–8)
#	Date	Opponent	Rank	Site/stadium	Score	Win	Loss	Save	Attendance	Overall Record	B1G Record
9	March 1	at Long Beach State		Blair Field	10–6	**Connolly** (1–1)	Donegan (0–1)	**Rogers** (2)	2,320	5–4	–
10	March 2	at Long Beach State		Blair Field	7–6	**Carey** (1–0)	Geiss (1–3)	**Debiec** (1)	2,485	6–4	–
11	March 4	at UCLA		Jackie Robinson Stadium; Los Angeles, CA	5–22 ^{(7)}	Rodriguez (1–0)	**K. Barr** (0–2)	–	453	6–5	–
12	March 5	at UC Riverside		Riverside Sports Complex; Riverside, CA	**Cancelled**						
13	March 7	vs. Illinois		Jackie Robinson Training Complex; Vero Beach, FL	12–7	**Carey** (2–0)	Schmitt (1–1)	**Rogers** (3)	949	7–5	1–0
14	March 8	vs. Illinois		Jackie Robinson Training Complex	6–5	**Connolly** (2–1)	Ross (0–1)	–	923	8–5	2–0
15	March 9	vs. Illinois		Jackie Robinson Training Complex	2–6	Bates (1–0)	**Vigue** (0–1)	–	765	8–6	2–1
16	March 11	Toledo		Ray Fisher Stadium; Ann Arbor, MI	6–4	**Carey** (3–0)	Skeriotis (0–1)	**Rogers** (4)	644	9–6	–
17	March 12	at Michigan State		McLane Baseball Stadium; East Lansing, MI	11–7	**Kasner** (2–0)	Grundman (1–1)	–	1,487	10–6	–
18	March 14	USC		Ray Fisher Stadium	4–7	Hunter (3–1)	**Lally Jr.** (1–1)	Hedges (1)	1,172	10–7	2–2
19	March 15	USC		Ray Fisher Stadium	3–4	Aoki (2–1)	**Rogers** (0–1)	Edwards (1)	858	10–8	2–3
20	March 16	USC		Ray Fisher Stadium	11–0	**K. Barr** (1–2)	Govel (1–2)	–	805	11–8	3–3
21	March 18	Western Michigan		Ray Fisher Stadium	0–6	Gaber (1–2)	**Bradley** (0–1)	–	494	11–9	–
22	March 21	at Purdue		Alexander Field; West Lafayette, IN	13–3 ^{(7)}	**Lally Jr.** (2–1)	Doorn (4–1)	–	1,220	12–9	4–3
23	March 22	at Purdue		Alexander Field	6–9	Cook (1–0)	**Debiec** (0–1)	–		12–10	4–4
24	March 22	at Purdue		Alexander Field	12–9	**K. Barr** (2–2)	Van Assen (2–1)	**Rogers** (5)	1,360	13–10	5–4
25	March 25	Eastern Michigan		Ray Fisher Stadium	8–9	Davis (2–0)	**Rogers** (0–2)	–	550	13–11	–
26	March 28	Penn State		Ray Fisher Stadium	5–12	Desanto (5–1)	**Lally Jr.** (2–2)	–	988	13–12	6–4
27	March 29	Penn State		Ray Fisher Stadium	8–7	**Rogers** (1–2)	Horwat (4–2)	–	1,386	14–12	7–4
28	March 30	Penn State		Ray Fisher Stadium	6–5	**K. Barr** (3–2)	Demell (1–2)	**Debiec** (2)	1,280	15–12	7–5

April (12–5)
#	Date	Opponent	Rank	Site/stadium	Score	Win	Loss	Save	Attendance	Overall Record	B1G Record
29	April 1	at Eastern Michigan		Oestrike Stadium; Ypsilanti, MI	13–2 ^{(7)}	**Carey** (4–0)	Milligan (0–1)	–	250	16–12	–
30	April 4	at No. 15 Oregon		PK Park; Eugene, OR	2–15 ^{(7)}	Grinnell (5–1)	**Lally Jr.** (2–3)	–	3,703	16–13	7–6
31	April 5	at No. 15 Oregon		PK Park	3–13 ^{(8)}	Featherston (2–0)	**Vigue** (0–2)	–	4,130	16–14	7–7
32	April 6	at No. 15 Oregon		PK Park	12–11	**Rogers** (2–2)	Knox (1–2)	**Debiec** (3)	2,536	17–14	8–7
33	April 8	Akron		Ray Fisher Stadium	13–0 ^{(7)}	**Carey** (5–0)	Ross (1–2)	–	244	18–14	–
34	April 9	Oakland		Ray Fisher Stadium	8–7 ^{(10)}	**Rogers** (3–2)	Uhlenhake (1–2)	–	101	19–14	–
35	April 11	Mount St. Mary's		Ray Fisher Stadium	10–0 ^{(7)}	**Lally Jr.** (3–3)	Arnold (0–3)	–	752	20–14	–
36	April 12	Mount St. Mary's		Ray Fisher Stadium	3–1	**K. Barr** (4–2)	Sarre (3–4)	**Rogers** (6)	1,353	21–14	–
37	April 13	Mount St. Mary's		Ray Fisher Stadium	10–0 ^{(7)}	**Carey** (6–0)	Andrews (0–3)	–	1,134	22–14	–
38	April 15	at Toledo		Scott Park Baseball Complex; Toledo, OH	10–0 ^{(7)}	**Connolly** (3–1)	Leininger (3–5)	–	911	23–14	–
39	April 18	Iowa		Ray Fisher Stadium	5–6	Wright (2–1)	**Vigue** (0–3)	Hogue (1)	1,604	23–15	8–8
40	April 19	Iowa		Ray Fisher Stadium	2–3	Savary (6–0)	**K. Barr** (4–3)	Wheatley (1)	1,531	23–16	8–9
41	April 20	Iowa		Ray Fisher Stadium	4–7	Watts (3–2)	**Vigue** (0–4)	–	1,088	23–17	8–10
42	April 22	Bowling Green		Ray Fisher Stadium	9–2	**Rogers** (4–2)	Krouse (2–1)	–	493	24–17	–
43	April 25	Michigan State		Ray Fisher Stadium	8–2	**K. Barr** (5–3)	Farquhar (2–1)	–	1,663	25–17	9–10
44	April 26	Michigan State		Ray Fisher Stadium	9–2	**Lally Jr.** (4–3)	Dzierwa (6–2)	–	1,884	26–17	10–10
45	April 27	Michigan State		Ray Fisher Stadium	6–5	**Carey** (7–0)	Higgins (3–4)	**Rogers** (7)	2,226	27–17	11–10

May (5–2)
#	Date	Opponent	Rank	Site/stadium	Score	Win	Loss	Save	Attendance	Overall Record	B1G Record
46	May 3	at Ohio State		Bill Davis Stadium; Columbus, OH	23–1 ^{(7)}	**K. Barr** (6–3)	Erdmann (0–7)	–	0	28–17	12–10
47	May 4	at Ohio State		Bill Davis Stadium	11–4	**Vigue** (1–4)	Kuzniewski (3–5)	–	0	29–17	13–10
48	May 4	at Ohio State		Bill Davis Stadium	13–3 ^{(8)}	**Carey** (8–0)	Michalak (1–5)	–	2,143	30–17	14–10
49	May 7	Central Michigan		Ray Fisher Stadium	8–7	**P. Barr** (1–0)	Smith (1–1)	**Vigue** (1)	424	31–17	–
50	May 9	at Nebraska		Hawks Field; Lincoln, NE	2–3	Timmerman (2–1)	**K. Barr** (6–4)	Broderick (1)	5,804	31–18	14–11
51	May 10	at Nebraska		Hawks Field	2–5	Broderick (3–2)	**Lally Jr.** (4–4)	–	5,832	31–19	14–12
52	May 11	at Nebraska		Hawks Field	3–1	**Rogers** (5–2)	Christo (1–2)	–	6,044	32–19	15–12
53	May 13	Wisconsin–Milwaukee		Ray Fisher Stadium	**Cancelled**						
54	May 15	Indiana		Ray Fisher Stadium	7–8	Yarberry (2–0)	**K. Barr** (6–5)	Seebold (1)	1,322	32–20	15–13
55	May 16	Indiana		Ray Fisher Stadium	1–8	Gilley (9–3)	**Lally Jr.** (4–5)	Grable (1)	1,678	32–21	15–14
56	May 17	Indiana		Ray Fisher Stadium	8–3	**Carey** (9–0)	Swanson (2–2)	**Rogers** (8)	1,411	33–21	16–14

Postseason (0–2)

B1G Tournament (0–2)
#	Date	Opponent	Rank	Stadium Site	Score	Win	Loss	Save	Attendance	Overall Record	B1GT Record
57	May 20	vs. (11) Illinois	(7)	Charles Schwab Field; Omaha, NE	5–6 ^{(10)}	Bates (2–2)	**Rogers** (5–3)	–	0	33–22	0–1
58	May 22	vs. (2) No. 13 UCLA	(7)	Charles Schwab Field	5–7	Rissas (1–2)	**P. Barr** (1–1)	Souza (1)	0	33–23	0–2

- Win
- Loss
- Postponement
- Bold: Wolverines team member
- Rankings from D1Baseball.com.
- (#) Tournament seedings in parentheses.

== Rankings ==
Ranking movements Legend: ██ Increase in ranking ██ Decrease in ranking — = Not ranked RV = Received votes
	Week																
Poll	Pre	1	2	3	4	5	6	7	8	9	10	11	12	13	14	15	Final
Coaches'	—	—*	RV	RV	—	—	—	—	—	—	—	—	—	—	—	—	
Baseball America	—	25	—	—	—	—	—	—	—	—	—	—	—	—	—	—	
NCBWA†	—	RV	RV	RV	RV	RV	—	—	—	—	RV	RV	RV	RV	RV	—	
D1Baseball	—	—	—	—	—	—	—	—	—	—	—	—	—	—	—	—	
Perfect Game	—	RV	—	—	—	—	—	—	—	—	—	—	—	—	—	—	

† NCBWA ranks 30 teams in their preseason poll, but only ranks 25 teams weekly during the season.
* A new poll was not released for this week, so for comparison purposes, the previous week's ranking is inserted in this week's slot.

== Awards and honors ==
All-Big Ten
Player	Selection	Ref.
Will Rogers	First Team	
Mitch Voit	First Team	
Benny Casillas	Second Team	
Tate Carey	Freshman Team	
Brayden Jefferis	Freshman Team	
Mitch Voit	All-Defensive Team	
