= 2024 Michigan Wolverines baseball team =

College baseball team season

2024 Michigan Wolverines baseball
- Conference: Big Ten Conference
- Record: 32–28 (14–10 Big Ten)
- Head coach: Tracy Smith (2nd season)
- Assistant coaches: Jake Valentine (1st season); Josh Phegley (1st season)
- Hitting coach: Tyler Graham (2nd season)
- Pitching coach: Brock Huntzinger (2nd season)
- Home stadium: Wilpon Baseball Complex

2024 Big Ten Conference baseball standings
	Conf.						Overall
Team	W		L		T	PCT	W		L		T	PCT
Illinois ‍†‍‍^{y}	18	–	6	–	0	.750	35	–	21	–	0	.625
Nebraska ‍‍‡‍^{y}	16	–	8	–	0	.667	40	–	22	–	0	.645
Indiana ‍‍‍^{y}	15	–	9	–	0	.625	33	–	26	–	1	.558
Iowa ‍‍‍	14	–	10	–	0	.583	31	–	23	–	0	.574
Michigan ‍‍‍	14	–	10	–	0	.583	32	–	28	–	0	.533
Purdue ‍‍‍	13	–	11	–	0	.542	33	–	24	–	0	.579
Ohio State ‍‍‍	12	–	12	–	0	.500	29	–	26	–	0	.527
Penn State ‍‍‍	12	–	12	–	0	.500	29	–	24	–	0	.547
Minnesota ‍‍‍	11	–	13	–	0	.458	25	–	23	–	0	.521
Michigan State ‍‍‍	11	–	13	–	0	.458	24	–	27	–	0	.471
Maryland ‍‍‍	10	–	14	–	0	.417	34	–	22	–	0	.607
Rutgers ‍‍‍	6	–	18	–	0	.250	28	–	25	–	0	.528
Northwestern ‍‍‍	4	–	20	–	0	.167	18	–	34	–	0	.346
† – Conference champion ‡ – Tournament champion y – Invited to the NCAA tournament As of May 26, 2024; Rankings from D1Baseball

The 2024 Michigan Wolverines baseball team represented the University of Michigan in the 2024 NCAA Division I baseball season. The Wolverines were led by head coach Tracy Smith in his second season, were a member of the Big Ten Conference and played their home games at Wilpon Baseball Complex in Ann Arbor, Michigan.

== Previous season ==
The Wolverines finished the 2022 season 28–28, including 13–11 in conference play, finishing in sixth place in their conference. Following the conclusion of the regular season, the Wolverines reached the semifinals of the 2023 Big Ten baseball tournament, and did not receive a bid to the 2023 NCAA Division I baseball tournament.

== Roster ==
2024 Michigan Wolverines baseball team
Players
Coaches

#	Pos.	Name	B/T	Height	Weight	Year	Previous school	Home town
0	RHP	Michael Murphy	R/R	6 ft 0 in (1.83 m)	195 lb (88 kg)	Fr	William Mason	Mason, Ohio
2	INF	Cole Caruso	R/R	6 ft 3 in (1.91 m)	205 lb (93 kg)	Jr	Cactus Shadows	Scottsdale, Arizona
3	OF	Greg Pace Jr.	R/R	6 ft 3 in (1.91 m)	185 lb (84 kg)	So	Edison Academy	Southfield, Michigan
4	C	Noah Miller	R/R	6 ft 0 in (1.83 m)	200 lb (91 kg)	Fr	Monroe	Monroe, Michigan
5	INF	Kyle Dernedde	R/R	5 ft 9 in (1.75 m)	185 lb (84 kg)	Gr	Tualatin	Tualatin, Oregon
6	RHP	Kurt Barr	R/R	6 ft 2 in (1.88 m)	175 lb (79 kg)	So	University Liggett	Saint Joachim, Ontario
7	OF	Joe Longo	R/R	6 ft 0 in (1.83 m)	215 lb (98 kg)	Jr	Holy Angels	Apple Valley, Minnesota
9	INF	Dylan Stanton	R/R	6 ft 1 in (1.85 m)	190 lb (86 kg)	Sr	Gull Lake	Richland, Michigan
10	RHP	Bradley Link	R/R	5 ft 10 in (1.78 m)	190 lb (86 kg)	Fr	William T. Dwyer	Palm Beach Gardens, Florida
12	RHP	Sachem Ramos	R/R	6 ft 1 in (1.85 m)	180 lb (82 kg)	Fr	Salisbury School	Brooklyn, New York
14	INF	Joonsung Park	R/R	6 ft 0 in (1.83 m)	195 lb (88 kg)	Fr	IMG Academy	Seoul, South Korea
15	OF	Stephen Hrustich	R/R	6 ft 1 in (1.85 m)	225 lb (102 kg)	Gr	Parkview	Stone Mountain, Georgia
17	INF	Mack Timbrook	L/R	5 ft 10 in (1.78 m)	180 lb (82 kg)	Gr	Archbishop Hoban	Kent, Ohio
18	OF	AJ Garcia	L/L	5 ft 10 in (1.78 m)	170 lb (77 kg)	RS Fr	DePaul College Prep	Chicago, Illinois
19	RHP	Brandon Mann	R/R	6 ft 3 in (1.91 m)	225 lb (102 kg)	So	Detroit Country Day	Franklin, Michigan
20	RHP	Ricky Kidd	R/R	6 ft 1 in (1.85 m)	185 lb (84 kg)	Jr	Trenton	Trenton, Michigan
21	OF	Jonathan Kim	L/L	5 ft 11 in (1.8 m)	185 lb (84 kg)	So	Brookfield Academy	Brookfield, Wisconsin
22	LHP	Wyatt Novara	L/L	6 ft 3 in (1.91 m)	200 lb (91 kg)	Fr	Dexter	Dexter, Michigan
23	C	Will Rogers	R/R	6 ft 1 in (1.85 m)	215 lb (98 kg)	Jr	Mounds View	Shoreview, Minnesota
25	C	Brock Leitgeb	R/R	6 ft 0 in (1.83 m)	200 lb (91 kg)	Fr	Jesuit	Portland, Oregon
26	INF	Collin Priest	L/R	6 ft 4 in (1.93 m)	225 lb (102 kg)	Fr	Mount Dora Christian	Mount Dora, Florida
27	RHP	Dylan Vigue	R/R	6 ft 3 in (1.91 m)	200 lb (91 kg)	Fr	Groton School	Leominster, Massachusetts
28	RHP	Jackson Muir	R/R	6 ft 2 in (1.88 m)	200 lb (91 kg)	Fr	Saline	Saline, Michigan
29	LHP	Keegan O'Hearn	L/L	6 ft 5 in (1.96 m)	225 lb (102 kg)	Fr	O'Neill CVI	Oshawa, Ontario
30	INF	Jack Counsell	R/R	6 ft 0 in (1.83 m)	175 lb (79 kg)	Fr	Whitefish Bay	Whitefish Bay, Wisconsin
32	RHP	Eamon Horwedel	R/R	6 ft 0 in (1.83 m)	183 lb (83 kg)	Gr	Skyline	Ann Arbor, Michigan
34	RHP	Zach Slayden	R/R	6 ft 3 in (1.91 m)	205 lb (93 kg)	Fr	Tomball	Tomball, Texas
35	LHP	Alfredo Velazquez	L/L	5 ft 8 in (1.73 m)	170 lb (77 kg)	Fr	Brother Rice	Melvindale, Michigan
36	INF	Trevor Kilinski	L/R	6 ft 1 in (1.85 m)	200 lb (91 kg)	Sr	Zeeland West	Zeeland, Michigan
37	RHP	Chase Allen	R/R	6 ft 6 in (1.98 m)	220 lb (100 kg)	Sr	Regis Jesuit	Littleton, Colorado
39	OF	Bradley Navarro	R/R	5 ft 11 in (1.8 m)	185 lb (84 kg)	Fr	Huntington Beach	Huntington Beach, California
40	INF	Cooper Mullens	R/R	5 ft 7 in (1.7 m)	155 lb (70 kg)	Fr	Marist Catholic	Eugene, Oregon
41	RHP	Charlie Denomme	R/R	6 ft 4 in (1.93 m)	220 lb (100 kg)	Fr	Thayer Academy	Wellesley, Massachusetts
42	OF	Ian Kennedy	R/R	6 ft 3 in (1.91 m)	230 lb (104 kg)	Sr	Whitefield Academy	Douglasville, Georgia
45	RHP	Ryan O'Rourke	R/R	6 ft 3 in (1.91 m)	185 lb (84 kg)	Fr	Charlotte Christian	Charlotte, North Carolina
47	LHP	Jacob Denner	L/L	6 ft 0 in (1.83 m)	195 lb (88 kg)	Gr	Bergen Catholic	Closter, New Jersey
48	RHP	Connor Judge	R/R	6 ft 5 in (1.96 m)	185 lb (84 kg)	Fr	College Park	The Woodlands, Texas
50	RHP	Alexander Ogg	R/R	6 ft 5 in (1.96 m)	200 lb (91 kg)	Gr	The Harvey School	Mount Kisco, New York
55	INF	Mitch Voit	R/R	6 ft 0 in (1.83 m)	190 lb (86 kg)	So	Whitefish Bay	Whitefish Bay, Wisconsin

Head coach

Tracy Smith

Assistant coach(es)

Jake Valentine
Josh Phegley

Hitting coach(es)

Tyler Graham

Pitching coach(es)

Brock Huntzinger

Legend

- (C) Team captain
- (S) Suspended
- (I) Ineligible
- Injured
- Current redshirt

Roster
Last update: January 30, 2024

== Schedule and results ==
2024 Michigan Wolverines baseball game log
Regular season (30–26)

February (3–6)
#	Date	Opponent	Rank	Site/stadium	Score	Win	Loss	Save	Attendance	Overall Record	B1G Record
1	February 16	vs. Western Michigan		Camelback Ranch; Glendale, AZ	13–14 ^{(11)}	Berg (1–0)	**Velazquez** (0–1)	—	244	0–1	–
2	February 17	vs. Western Michigan		Camelback Ranch	9–11^{(10)}	Doran (1–0)	**Pace Jr.** (0–1)	—	204	0–2	–
3	February 17	vs. Western Michigan		Camelback Ranch	9–4 ^{(7)}	**Denner** (1–0)	Thelen (0–1)	—	144	1–2	–
4	February 18	vs. Western Michigan		Camelback Ranch	6–2	**Allen** (1–0)	Dentler (0–1)	**Kidd** (1)	204	2–2	–
5	February 23	vs. Oklahoma State; College Baseball Series		Globe Life Field; Arlington, TX	3–9	Garcia (1–1)	**Voit** (0–1)	—	—	2–3	–
6	February 24	vs. No. 7 Oregon State; College Baseball Series		Globe Life Field	1–11^{(7)}	Kmatz (1–0)	**Denner** (1–1)	—	—	2–4	–
7	February 25	vs. No. 2 Arkansas; College Baseball Series		Globe Life Field	3–4	Molina (1–0)	**Vigue** (0–1)	Frank (2)	—	2–5	–
8	February 27	vs. USC		George C. Page Stadium; Los Angeles, CA	8–5	**Allen** (2–0)	Edwards (0–2)	**Kidd** (2)	258	3–5	–
9	February 28	at Loyola Marymount		George C. Page Stadium	1–9	Barrett (1–1)	**Barr** (0–1)	—	400	3–6	–

March (8–11)
#	Date	Opponent	Rank	Site/stadium	Score	Win	Loss	Save	Attendance	Overall Record	B1G Record
10	March 1	at UCLA; Dodgertown Classic		Jackie Robinson Stadium; Los Angeles, CA	4–3	**Voit** (1–1)	Delvecchio (1–1)	—	770	4–6	–
11	March 2	at UC Irvine; Dodgertown Classic		Anteater Ballpark; Irvine, CA	4–12	Wheeler (1–0)	**Denner** (1–2)	Martin (2)	896	4–7	–
12	March 3	vs. San Diego; Dodgertown Classic		Dodger Stadium; Los Angeles, CA	1–9	Reddemann (1–0)	**Vigue** (0–2)	—	410	4–8	–
13	March 6	Oakland		Ray Fisher Stadium; Ann Arbor, MI	13–5	**Kidd** (1–0)	McAlinden (0–2)	—	544	5–8	–
14	March 8	at No. 18 Coastal Carolina		Springs Brooks Stadium; Conway, SC	7–8^{(12)}	Smith (1–0)	**Rogers** (0–1)	—	2,309	5–9	–
15	March 9	at No. 18 Coastal Carolina		Springs Brooks Stadium	6–19	Meckley (2–0)	**Allen** (2–1)	—	2,175	5–10	–
16	March 10	at No. 18 Coastal Carolina		Springs Brooks Stadium	6–11	Shaffer (1–0)	**Voit** (1–2)	—	2,757	5–11	–
17	March 12	Toledo		Ray Fisher Stadium	7–6^{(12)}	**Barr** (1–1)	Skeriotis (0–1)	—	412	6–11	–
18	March 15	San Diego		Ray Fisher Stadium	6–8	Mauterer (1–0)	**Voit** (1–3)	Romero (1)	702	6–12	–
19	March 16	San Diego		Ray Fisher Stadium	7–16	Schapira (2–0)	**Allen** (2–2)	—	979	6–13	–
20	March 17	San Diego		Ray Fisher Stadium	3–2	**Barr** (2–1)	Mauterer (1–1)	—	620	7–13	–
21	March 19	at Eastern Michigan		Oestrike Stadium; Ypsilanti, MI	4–14^{(7)}	B. Jones (3–2)	**Kidd** (1–1)	—	375	7–14	–
22	March 22	at Penn State		Medlar Field; State College, PA	3–4	DeGaetano (1–2)	**Denner** (1–3)	—	1,005	7–15	0–1
23	March 23	at Penn State		Medlar Field	9–6	**Barr** (3–1)	Butash (0–2)	**Rogers** (1)	950	8–15	1–1
24	March 24	at Penn State		Medlar Field	11–6	**Voit** (2–3)	Perkowski (0–2)	—	1,060	9–15	2–1
25	March 26	Michigan State		Ray Fisher Stadium	6–16	Matheny (1–1)	**Kidd** (1–2)	—	1,062	9–16	–
26	March 29	Maryland		Ray Fisher Stadium	9–11	Berrier (6–0)	**Rogers** (0–2)	—	1,101	9–17	2–2
27	March 30	Maryland		Ray Fisher Stadium	12–1	**Denner** (2–3)	Koester (4–2)	—	879	10–17	3–2
28	March 31	Maryland		Ray Fisher Stadium	9–4	**Voit** (3–3)	Melendez (2–1)	—	752	11–17	4–2

April (13–4)
#	Date	Opponent	Rank	Site/stadium	Score	Win	Loss	Save	Attendance	Overall Record	B1G Record
29	April 2	Eastern Michigan		Ray Fisher Stadium	18–6^{(7)}	**Allen** (3–2)	D. Jones (0–2)	—	504	12–17	–
30	April 5	at Iowa		Duane Banks Field; Iowa City, IA	2–3^{(10)}	DeTaeye (2–0)	**Barr** (3–2)	—	739	12–18	4–3
31	April 6	at Iowa		Duane Banks Field	4–3	**Voit** (3–3)	Morgan (1–3)	**Rogers** (2)	1,417	13–18	5–3
32	April 6	at Iowa		Duane Banks Field	10–6	**Denner** (3–3)	Beuter (0–2)	—	1,417	14–18	6–3
33	April 9	Western Michigan		Ray Fisher Stadium	9–10	Vriesenga (2–0)	**Kidd** (1–3)	Berg (2)	744	14–19	–
34	April 10	Wisconsin-Milwaukee		Ray Fisher Stadium	3–1	**Kidd** (2–3)	Spitzer (0–2)	**Denner** (1)	604	15–19	–
35	April 13	Minnesota		Ray Fisher Stadium	8–1	**Barr** (4–2)	Semb (1–3)	—	1,121	16–19	7–3
37	April 13	Minnesota		Ray Fisher Stadium	3–8	Weitgrefe (4–2)	**Vigue** (0–3)	—	1,121	16–20	7–4
38	April 14	Minnesota		Ray Fisher Stadium	10–3	**Voit** (5–3)	Argento (0–1)	—	1,275	17–20	8–4
39	April 16	at Toledo		Fifth Third Field; Toledo, OH	6–4	**Denner** (4–3)	Bergman (1–3)	—	1,373	18–20	–
40	April 19	Ohio State		Ray Fisher Stadium	4–0	**Barr** (5–2)	Beidelschies (4–6)	**Denner** (2)	1,765	19–20	9–4
41	April 20	Ohio State		Ray Fisher Stadium	1–16	Bruni (3–2)	**Rogers** (0–3)	—	1,630	19–21	9–5
42	April 21	Ohio State		Ray Fisher Stadium	7–5	**Denner** (5–3)	Purcell (1–4)	—	2,295	20–21	10–5
43	April 26	Long Beach State		Ray Fisher Stadium	14–7	**Denner** (6–3)	Williams (1–2)	—	1,077	21–21	–
44	April 27	Long Beach State		Ray Fisher Stadium	7–5	**Rogers** (1–3)	Largaespada (1–1)	**Denner** (3)	1,027	22–21	–
45	April 28	Long Beach State		Ray Fisher Stadium	5–4	**Vigue** (1–3)	Geiss (2–2)	**Denner** (4)	1,401	23–21	–
46	April 30	Kent State		Ray Fisher Stadium	6–4^{(11)}	**Mann** (1–0)	Cariaco (4–2)	—	784	24–21	–

May (6–5)
#	Date	Opponent	Rank	Site/stadium	Score	Win	Loss	Save	Attendance	Overall Record	B1G Record
47	May 3	at Michigan State		McLane Baseball Stadium; East Lansing, MI	2–3^{(10)}	Mishoulam (3–1)	**Denner** (6–4)	—	1,610	24–22	10–6
48	May 4	at Michigan State		McLane Baseball Stadium	8–12	Cook (2–2)	**Rogers** (1–4)	—	1,954	24–23	10–7
49	May 5	at Michigan State		McLane Baseball Stadium	10–8^{(12)}	**Kidd** (3–3)	Moczydlowsky (0–2)	—	1,621	25–23	11–7
50	May 8	Central Michigan		Ray Fisher Stadium	9–5	**Horwedel** (1–0)	Miller (1–6)	—	654	26–23	–
51	May 10	Purdue		Ray Fisher Stadium	0–4	Morales (7–4)	**Barr** (5–3)	Cook (3)	1,326	26–24	11–8
52	May 11	Purdue		Ray Fisher Stadium	7–6	**Denner** (7–4)	Cook (2–2)	—	1,185	27–24	12–8
53	May 12	Purdue		Ray Fisher Stadium	8–6	**Vigue** (2–3)	Van Assen (5–1)	**Kidd** (3)	1,190	28–24	13–8
54	May 14	Akron		Ray Fisher Stadium	14–4^{(7)}	**Mann** (2–0)	Gillies (1–1)	—	844	29–24	–
55	May 16	at Indiana		Bart Kaufman Field; Bloomington, IN	3–2	**Denner** (8–4)	Buhr (1–2)	—	377	30–24	14–8
56	May 16	at Indiana		Bart Kaufman Field	2–11	Tonghini (2–1)	**Allen** (3–3)	—	1,337	30–25	14–9
57	May 17	at Indiana		Bart Kaufman Field	4–8	Risedorph (4–6)	**Vigue** (2–4)	—	1,837	30–26	14–10

Postseason (2–2)

B1G Tournament (2–2)
#	Date	Opponent	Rank	Stadium Site	Score	Win	Loss	Save	Attendance	Overall Record	B1GT Record
58	May 22	vs. (5) Iowa	(4)	Charles Schwab Field; Omaha, NE	3–2 ^{(10)}	**Denner** (9–4)	Young (2–1)	—	—	31–26	1–0
59	May 23	vs. (8) Penn State	(4)	Charles Schwab Field	5–9	Morash (2–0)	**Kidd** (3–4)	—	1,971	31–27	1–1
60	May 24	vs. (1) Illinois	(4)	Charles Schwab Field	4–2	**Rogers** (2–4)	Hutchings (4–2)	**Vigue** (1)	6,871	32–27	2–1
61	May 25	vs. (8) Penn State	(4)	Charles Schwab Field	6–7^{(10)}	DeMell (1–0)	**Denner** (9–5)	—	—	32–28	2–2

- Win
- Loss
- Postponement
- Bold: Wolverines team member
- Rankings from D1Baseball.com.
- (#) Tournament seedings in parentheses.

== Rankings ==
Ranking movements Legend: — = Not ranked
	Week																		
Poll	Pre	1	2	3	4	5	6	7	8	9	10	11	12	13	14	15	16	17	Final
Coaches'	—	—*	—	—	—	—	—	—	—	—	—	—	—	—	—	—	—	—	—
Baseball America	—	—	—	—	—	—	—	—	—	—	—	—	—	—	—	—	—	—	—
NCBWA†	—	—	—	—	—	—	—	—	—	—	—	—	—	—	—	—	—	—	—
D1Baseball	—	—	—	—	—	—	—	—	—	—	—	—	—	—	—	—	—	—	—

† NCBWA ranks 30 teams in their preseason poll, but only ranks 25 teams weekly during the season.
* A new poll was not released for this week, so for comparison purposes, the previous week's ranking is inserted in this week's slot.

== Awards and honors ==
All-Big Ten
Player	Selection	Ref.
Jacob Denner	First Team	
Stephen Hrustich	First Team	
Mitch Voit	First Team	
Kurt Barr	Third Team	
Mack Timbrook	Third Team	
Collin Priest	Freshman Team	
