= 2023 Michigan Wolverines baseball team =

College baseball team season

2023 Michigan Wolverines baseball
- Conference: Big Ten Conference
- Record: 28–28 (13–11 Big Ten)
- Head coach: Tracy Smith (1st season)
- Assistant coaches: Ben Greenspan (1st season); Tyler Graham (1st season)
- Pitching coach: Brock Huntzinger (1st season)
- Home stadium: Wilpon Baseball Complex

2023 Big Ten Conference baseball standings
	Conf.						Overall
Team	W		L		T	PCT	W		L		T	PCT
Maryland ‍†‍‡‍^{y}	17	–	7	–	0	.708	42	–	19	–	0	.689
Indiana ‍‍‍^{y}	16	–	8	–	0	.667	41	–	18	–	0	.695
Iowa ‍‍‍^{y}	15	–	8	–	0	.652	43	–	14	–	0	.754
Nebraska ‍‍‍	15	–	9	–	0	.625	33	–	23	–	1	.588
Rutgers ‍‍‍	14	–	10	–	0	.583	33	–	23	–	0	.589
Michigan ‍‍‍	13	–	11	–	0	.542	28	–	28	–	0	.500
Michigan State ‍‍‍	12	–	12	–	0	.500	33	–	22	–	0	.600
Illinois ‍‍‍	12	–	12	–	0	.500	25	–	27	–	0	.481
Purdue ‍‍‍	11	–	13	–	0	.458	24	–	29	–	0	.453
Minnesota ‍‍‍	10	–	14	–	0	.417	18	–	34	–	0	.346
Ohio State ‍‍‍	9	–	15	–	0	.375	31	–	25	–	0	.554
Penn State ‍‍‍	7	–	16	–	0	.304	25	–	25	–	0	.500
Northwestern ‍‍‍	4	–	20	–	0	.167	10	–	40	–	0	.200
† – Conference champion ‡ – Tournament champion y – Invited to the NCAA tournament As of June 2, 2023; Rankings from D1Baseball

The 2023 Michigan Wolverines baseball team represented the University of Michigan in the 2023 NCAA Division I baseball season. The Wolverines were led by head coach Tracy Smith in his first season, are a member of the Big Ten Conference and played their home games at Wilpon Baseball Complex in Ann Arbor, Michigan.

== Previous season ==
The Wolverines finished the 2022 season 34–28, including 12–12 in conference play, finishing in fifth place in their conference. Following the conclusion of the regular season, the Wolverines won the 2022 Big Ten baseball tournament to receive an automatic bid to the 2022 NCAA Division I baseball tournament, where they lost in the regional final to Louisville.

== Preseason ==
Following the conclusion of the regular season, head coach Erik Bakich accepted the head coaching position at Clemson, after a ten-season run at Michigan which saw the Wolverines win two Big Ten baseball tournament championships and finish runner-up in the 2019 College World Series. On July 3, 2022, Tracy Smith was named head coach of the Wolverines.

== Roster ==
2023 Michigan Wolverines baseball team
Players
Coaches
}

#	Pos.	Name	B/T	Height	Weight	Year	Previous school	Home town
0	INF	Dan Blomgren	R/R	5 ft 10 in (1.78 m)	165 lb (75 kg)	Jr	Craig	Milton, Wisconsin
2	INF	Camden Gasser	L/R	5 ft 10 in (1.78 m)	160 lb (73 kg)	So	Southridge	Huntingburg, Indiana
3	INF	Ted Burton	R/R	6 ft 3 in (1.91 m)	190 lb (86 kg)	Sr	Edison	Huntington Beach, California
4	INF	Brandon Lawrence	S/R	6 ft 0 in (1.83 m)	190 lb (86 kg)	Jr	Dunn	Santa Ynez, California
5	C	Jimmy Obertop	R/R	6 ft 2 in (1.88 m)	230 lb (104 kg)	Sr	Westminster Christian Academy	St. Louis, Missouri
6	OF	Greg Pace Jr.	R/R	6 ft 3 in (1.91 m)	185 lb (84 kg)	Fr	Edison Academy	Southfield, Michigan
7	OF	Jake Marti	S/R	6 ft 4 in (1.93 m)	200 lb (91 kg)	Sr	Normal West	Bloomington, Illinois
8	RHP	John Torroella	R/R	6 ft 4 in (1.93 m)	205 lb (93 kg)	RS Sr	Mount Saint Joseph	Ellicott City, Maryland
9	INF	Dylan Stanton	R/R	6 ft 1 in (1.85 m)	190 lb (86 kg)	RS Jr	Gull Lake	Richland, Michigan
10	INF	Cody Hultink	R/R	6 ft 0 in (1.83 m)	175 lb (79 kg)	So	Pennfield	Battle Creek, Michigan
12	INF	Cody Jefferis	L/R	5 ft 8 in (1.73 m)	165 lb (75 kg)	RS Sr	Hart	Santa Clarita, California
14	RHP	Avery Goldensoph	R/R	6 ft 6 in (1.98 m)	170 lb (77 kg)	So	Swan Valley	Saginaw, Michigan
15	C	Gabe Sotres	R/R	5 ft 10 in (1.78 m)	208 lb (94 kg)	Jr	Brother Rice	Allen Park, Michigan
17	OF	Robert Pitts Jr.	S/R	5 ft 10 in (1.78 m)	107 lb (49 kg)	Fr	Birmingham	Los Angeles, California
18	C	Jordan Rodgers	R/R	5 ft 9 in (1.75 m)	175 lb (79 kg)	RS Sr	Simeon Career Academy	Chicago, Illinois
19	LHP	Logan Wood	L/L	6 ft 2 in (1.88 m)	180 lb (82 kg)	Jr	OLSM Prep	Macomb, Michigan
20	LHP	Connor O'Halloran	R/L	6 ft 2 in (1.88 m)	190 lb (86 kg)	Jr	St. Martin	Mississauga, Ontario
21	OF	Jonathan Kim	L/L	5 ft 11 in (1.8 m)	185 lb (84 kg)	Fr	Brookfield Academy	Brookfield, Wisconsin
22	OF	Tito Flores	R/R	6 ft 0 in (1.83 m)	190 lb (86 kg)	Sr	Brother Rice	Detroit, Michigan
23	C	Joe Longo	R/R	6 ft 0 in (1.83 m)	215 lb (98 kg)	So	Academy of Holy Angels	Apple Valley, Minnesota
24	OF	Joey Velazquez	L/L	6 ft 0 in (1.83 m)	230 lb (104 kg)	Sr	St. Francis DeSales	Lewis Center, Ohio
25	RHP	Kurt Barr	R/R	6 ft 2 in (1.88 m)	170 lb (77 kg)	Fr	University Liggett	Saint Joachim, Ontario
27	INF	Marc Willi	L/L	6 ft 4 in (1.93 m)	230 lb (104 kg)	Fr	Noble and Greenough	Weston, Massachusetts
28	INF	Cam Hart	R/R	6 ft 4 in (1.93 m)	210 lb (95 kg)	Sr	Armada	Armada, Michigan
30	C	Nate Voss	R/R	5 ft 11 in (1.8 m)	185 lb (84 kg)	Fr	Marist	Oak Lawn, Illinois
32	RHP	Eamon Horwedel	R/R	6 ft 0 in (1.83 m)	183 lb (83 kg)	RS Sr	Skyline	Ann Arbor, Michigan
34	RHP	Ahmad Harajli	R/R	6 ft 4 in (1.93 m)	240 lb (109 kg)	Jr	IMG Academy	Dearborn, Michigan
35	LHP	Walker Cleveland	L/L	6 ft 2 in (1.88 m)	175 lb (79 kg)	RS Sr	North Gwinnett	Suwanee, Georgia
36	INF	Trevor Kilinski	L/R	6 ft 1 in (1.85 m)	200 lb (91 kg)	Jr	Zeeland West	Zeeland, Michigan
37	RHP	Chase Allen	R/R	6 ft 6 in (1.98 m)	220 lb (100 kg)	Jr	Regis Jesuit	Littleton, Colorado
39	RHP	Jake Keaser	R/R	6 ft 1 in (1.85 m)	195 lb (88 kg)	So	OLSM Prep	Rochester, Michigan
42	OF	Ian Kennedy	R/R	6 ft 3 in (1.91 m)	230 lb (104 kg)	Jr	Whitefield Academy	Douglasville, Georgia
47	LHP	Jacob Denner	L/L	6 ft 0 in (1.83 m)	195 lb (88 kg)	Sr	Bergen Catholic	Closter, New Jersey
48	RHP	Noah Rennard	R/R	6 ft 3 in (1.91 m)	205 lb (93 kg)	Sr	Maria Carrillo	Santa Rosa, California
50	C	Casey Buckley	L/R	6 ft 1 in (1.85 m)	195 lb (88 kg)	RS Sr	Los Alamitos	Long Beach, California
51	INF	Jack Van Remortel	R/R	6 ft 2 in (1.88 m)	215 lb (98 kg)	RS Sr	Carmel	Carmel, Indiana
54	RHP	Ryan Zimmer	R/R	6 ft 5 in (1.96 m)	230 lb (104 kg)	Jr	St. Clair High School	St. Clair, Michigan
55	INF	Mitch Voit	R/R	6 ft 0 in (1.83 m)	190 lb (86 kg)	Fr	Whitefish Bay	Whitefish Bay, Wisconsin

Head coach

Tracy Smith

Assistant coach(es)

Ben Greenspan
Tyler Graham

Pitching coach(es)

Brock Huntzinger

Legend

- (C) Team captain
- (S) Suspended
- (I) Ineligible
- Injured
- Current redshirt

Roster
Last update: December 24, 2022

== Schedule and results ==
2023 Michigan Wolverines baseball game log
Regular season (26–26)

February (4–3)
#	Date	Opponent	Rank	Site/stadium	Score	Win	Loss	Save	Attendance	Overall Record	B1G Record
1	February 17	vs. Fresno State; MLB Desert Invitational		Sloan Park; Mesa, AZ	6–2	**O'Halloran** (1–0)	Henderson (0–1)	**Rennard** (1)	175	1–0	–
2	February 17	vs. Michigan State; MLB Desert Invitational		Sloan Park	8–15	Dzierwa (1–0)	**Goldensoph** (0–1)	Rush (1)	305	1–1	–
3	February 18	vs. UC San Diego; MLB Desert Invitational		Salt River Fields at Talking Stick; Scottsdale, AZ	2–11	Forcucci (1–0)	**Denner** (0–1)	Rissas (1)	501	1–2	–
4	February 19	vs. Grand Canyon; MLB Desert Invitational		Sloan Park	6–4	**Rennard** (1–0)	Young (0–1)	**Voit** (1)	907	2–2	–
—	February 24	at Cal State Fullerton		Goodwin Field; Fullerton, CA	Postponed (inclement weather)						
—	February 25	at Cal State Fullerton		Goodwin Field	Postponed (inclement weather)						
5	February 26	at Cal State Fullerton		Goodwin Field	9–5	**O'Halloran** (2–0)	Stultz (1–1)	—	1,011	3–2	–
6	February 26	at Cal State Fullerton		Goodwin Field	7–3	**Allen** (1–0)	Hinkel (0–1)	—	833	4–2	–
—	February 27	at Cal State Fullerton		Goodwin Field	Cancelled						
7	February 28	at UC Irvine		Cicerone Field; Irvine, CA	3–15	Stanford (1–0)	**Torroella** (0–1)	—	824	4–3	–

March (10–8)
#	Date	Opponent	Rank	Site/stadium	Score	Win	Loss	Save	Attendance	Overall Record	B1G Record
8	March 1	at No. 17 UCLA		Jackie Robinson Stadium; Los Angeles, CA	4–9	Aldrich (2–0)	**Denner** (0–2)	—	458	4–4	–
9	March 3	vs. No. 10 TCU; Shriners College Classic		Minute Maid Park; Houston, TX	0–6	Vanderhai (1–1)	**O'Halloran** (2–1)	Savage (1)	1,250	4–5	–
10	March 4	vs. No. 24 Texas Tech; Shriners College Classic		Minute Maid Park	7–10	Molina (2–0)	**Allen** (1–1)	Lopez (1)	—	4–6	–
11	March 5	vs. No. 14 Louisville; Shriners College Classic		Minute Maid Park	0–10 ^{(7)}	Liggett (2–0)	**Denner** (0–3)	—	5,003	4–7	–
12	March 8	Oakland		Ray Fisher Stadium; Ann Arbor, MI	1–4	Konitzer (1–0)	**Barr** (0–1)	—	207	4–8	–
14	March 10	vs. UAB; Mike Sansing Classic		Fred Stillwell Stadium; Kennesaw, GA	7–5 ^{(10)}	**Rennard** (2–0)	Haines (0–3)	—	395	5–8	–
13	March 10	at Kennesaw State; Mike Sansing Classic		Fred Stillwell Stadium	3–4	Wehunt (2–1)	**Allen** (1–2)	Pinson (1)	558	5–9	–
15	March 11	vs. UAB; Mike Sansing Classic		Fred Stillwell Stadium	3–2	**Voit** (1–0)	Walton (1–1)	—	391	6–9	–
—	March 12	at Kennesaw State; Mike Sansing Classic		Fred Stillwell Stadium	Cancelled						
16	March 15	at Xavier		J. Page Hayden Field; Cincinnati, OH	7–3	**Barr** (1–1)	Hoskins (1–1)	—	250	7–9	–
17	March 17	Bradley		Ray Fisher Stadium	8–4	**O'Halloran** (3–1)	Edders (1–1)	—	—	8–9	–
—	March 17	Bradley		Ray Fisher Stadium	Postponed (inclement weather)						
18	March 19	Bradley		Ray Fisher Stadium	6–4	**Allen** (2–2)	Lutz (1–1)	**Rennard** (2)	730	9–9	–
19	March 19	Bradley		Ray Fisher Stadium	1–5	Flack (2–0)	**Denner** (0–4)	Langrell (4)	730	9–10	–
20	March 21	Akron		Ray Fisher Stadium	10–11	Biglin (1–0)	**Harajli** (0–1)	—	193	9–11	–
21	March 24	Penn State		Ray Fisher Stadium	13–4	**O'Halloran** (4–1)	Ouderkirk (1–2)	—	783	10–11	1–0
22	March 25	Penn State		Ray Fisher Stadium	12–3	**Allen** (3–2)	Luensmann (4–1)	—	966	11–11	2–0
23	March 26	Penn State		Ray Fisher Stadium	3–1	**Rennard** (3–0)	Henline (2–1)	**Denner** (1)	1,201	12–11	3–0
24	March 28	Central Michigan		Ray Fisher Stadium	6–5 ^{(10)}	**Voit** (2–0)	Insco (0–1)	—	863	13–11	–
25	March 31	at Illinois		Illinois Field; Champaigh, IL	12–9	**O'Halloran** (5–1)	Gowens (1–2)	—	327	14–11	4–0

April (7–9)
#	Date	Opponent	Rank	Site/stadium	Score	Win	Loss	Save	Attendance	Overall Record	B1G Record
26	April 1	at Illinois		Illinois Field	10–5	**Rennard** (4–0)	Bunselmeyer (1–1)	—	571	15–11	5–0
27	April 2	at Illinois		Illinois Field	1–11	Wenninger (4–1)	**Cleveland** (0–1)	—	1,253	15–12	5–1
28	April 4	Western Michigan		Ray Fisher Stadium	12–5	**Torroella** (1–1)	Crandell (0–1)	**Voit** (2)	258	16–12	–
29	April 7	Nebraska		Ray Fisher Stadium	1–3 ^{(10)}	Schanaman (2–2)	**Rennard** (4–1)	—	1,372	16–13	5–2
30	April 8	Nebraska		Ray Fisher Stadium	8–6	**Allen** (4–2)	Kaminska (5–2)	**Voit** (3)	1,990	17–13	6–2
31	April 9	Nebraska		Ray Fisher Stadium	3–11	Garza (2–3)	**Denner** (0–5)	—	1,598	17–14	6–3
32	April 11	Butler		Ray Fisher Stadium	13–2	**Rennard** (5–1)	Thune (1–1)	—	785	18–14	–
33	April 14	at Rutgers		Bainton Field; Piscataway, NJ	0–13	Coppola (2–3)	**O'Halloran** (5–2)	—	1,352	18–15	6–4
—	April 15	at Rutgers		Bainton Field	Suspended (inclement weather). Continuation held on April 16.^{[a]}						
34	April 16	at Rutgers		Bainton Field	13–8	**O'Halloran** (6–2)	Gorski (1–1)	—	552	19–15	7–4
35	April 16	at Rutgers		Bainton Field	3–6	Conover (3–3)	**Rennard** (5–2)	—	607	19–16	7–5
36	April 19	Toledo		Ray Fisher Stadium	7–10	Music (4–2)	**Danner** (0–6)	McCune (2)	311	19–17	–
37	April 21	Michigan State		Ray Fisher Stadium	5–3	**Rennard** (6–2)	Dzierwa (4–2)	**Voit** (4)	1,766	20–17	8–5
38	April 22	Michigan State		Ray Fisher Stadium	8–3	**O'Halloran** (7–2)	Cook (4–3)	—	1,960	21–17	9–5
39	April 23	Michigan State		Ray Fisher Stadium	2–14	Powers (4–0)	**Allen** (4–3)	—	2,595	21–18	9–6
—	April 28	Oklahoma State		Ray Fisher Stadium	Postponed (inclement weather)						
40	April 29	Oklahoma State		Ray Fisher Stadium	3–5	Root (5–1)	**O'Halloran** (7–3)	Stebens (4)	1,619	21–19	–
41	April 30	Oklahoma State		Ray Fisher Stadium	5–8	Abram (6–2)	**Rennard** (6–3)	Stebens (5)	1,410	21–20	–

May (5–6)
#	Date	Opponent	Rank	Site/stadium	Score	Win	Loss	Save	Attendance	Overall Record	B1G Record
42	May 3	Kent State		Ray Fisher Stadium	7–5	**Allen** (5–3)	Dell (1–3)	**Voit** (5)	283	22–20	–
43	May 5	at Minnesota		Siebert Field; Minneapolis, MN	0–4	Novotny (2–5)	**O'Halloran** (7–4)	—	669	22–21	9–7
44	May 6	at Minnesota		Siebert Field	2–4	Wietgrefe (1–3)	**Voit** (2–1)	Clausen (4)	775	22–22	9–8
45	May 7	at Minnesota		Siebert Field	4–1	**Denner** (1–6)	Holetz (2–5)	—	770	23–22	10–8
46	May 12	Northwestern		Ray Fisher Stadium	12–5	**O'Halloran** (8–4)	Farinelli (1–9)	—	679	24–22	11–8
47	May 13	Northwestern		Ray Fisher Stadium	5–2	**Volt** (3–1)	Dyke (0–1)	—	1,764	25–22	12–8
48	May 14	Northwestern		Ray Fisher Stadium	15–5	**Denner** (2–6)	Benneche (0–8)	—	1,470	26–22	13–8
49	May 16	Xavier		Ray Fisher Stadium	2–14	Niedringhaus (2–0)	**Cleveland** (0–2)	—	712	26–23	–
50	May 18	at Ohio State		Nick Swisher Field; Columbus, OH	3–7	Jenkings (6–4)	**O'Halloran** (8–5)	—	1,615	26–24	13–9
51	May 19	at Ohio State		Nick Swisher Field	5–9	Coupet (4–3)	**Rennard** (6–4)	Jones (1)	2,116	26–25	13–10
52	May 20	at Ohio State		Nick Swisher Field	2–7	Bruni (5–3)	**Torroella** (1–2)	—	2,268	26–26	13–11

Postseason (2–2)

B1G Tournament (2–2)
#	Date	Opponent	Rank	Stadium Site	Score	Win	Loss	Save	Attendance	Overall Record	B1GT Record
53	May 23	vs. (3) Iowa	(6)	Charles Schwab Field; Omaha, NE	3–13 ^{(8)}	Whitlock (7–0)	**O'Halloran** (8–6)	—	—	26–27	0–1
54	May 24	vs. (7) Illinois	(6)	Charles Schwab Field	6–3	**Rennard** (7–4)	Gowens (2–3)	**Denner** (2)	5,650	27–27	1–1
55	May 26	vs. (2) Indiana	(6)	Charles Schwab Field	13–6	**Voit** (4–1)	Bothwell (4–2)	**Denner** (3)	—	28–27	2–1
56	May 27	vs. (3) Iowa	(6)	Charles Schwab Field	0–5	Langenberg (6–3)	**Mann** (0–1)	—	—	28–28	2–2

- Win
- Loss
- Postponement
- Bold: Wolverines team member
- Rankings from D1Baseball.com.
- (#) Tournament seedings in parentheses.

Notes:

- **^{a}** The April 15 game at Rutgers was suspended due to lightning in the top of the fourth inning with the score tied 6–6. It was completed on April 16 prior to the regularly scheduled game that afternoon.

== Rankings ==
Ranking movements Legend: ██ Increase in ranking ██ Decrease in ranking — = Not ranked RV = Received votes
	Week																		
Poll	Pre	1	2	3	4	5	6	7	8	9	10	11	12	13	14	15	16	17	Final
Coaches'	—	—*	—	—	—	—	—	—	—	—	—	—	—	—	—	—	—	—	—
Baseball America	—	—	—	—	—	—	—	—	—	—	—	—	—	—	—	—	—	—	—
Collegiate Baseball^	44	—	—	—	—	—	—	—	—	—	—	—	—	—	—	—	—	—	—
NCBWA†	RV	—	—	—	—	—	—	—	—	—	—	—	—	—	—	—	—	—	—
D1Baseball	—	—	—	—	—	—	—	—	—	—	—	—	—	—	—	—	—	—	—

^ Collegiate Baseball ranked 40 teams in their preseason poll, but only ranked 30 teams weekly during the season.
† NCBWA ranks 30 teams in their preseason poll, but only ranks 25 teams weekly during the season.
* A new poll was not released for this week, so for comparison purposes, the previous week's ranking is inserted in this week's slot.

== Awards and honors ==
Individual Awards
Player	Award	Ref.
Connor O'Halloran	Big Ten Pitcher of the Year	

All-Big Ten
Player	Selection	Ref.
Connor O'Halloran	First Team	
Ted Burton	Third Team	
Jonathan Kim	Third Team	
Jonathan Kim	Freshman Team	
Mitch Voit	Freshman Team	

All-American
Player	Selection	Ref.
Mitch Voit	Freshman Team	

== Major League Baseball draft ==
The following Wolverine was selected in the 2023 Major League Baseball draft:

List of Drafted Players
Name	2023 Class	Pos.	Team	Overall
Connor O'Halloran	Junior	LHP	Toronto Blue Jays	157th
