= 2023 Maryland Terrapins baseball team =

American college baseball season

2023 Maryland Terrapins baseball

Big Ten regular season and tournament champions

NCAA Winston-Salem Regional, 1–2
- Conference: Big Ten Conference
- Record: 42–19 (17–7 Big Ten)
- Head coach: Rob Vaughn (6th season)
- Assistant coach: Anthony Papio (6th season)
- Hitting coach: Matt Swope (6th season)
- Pitching coach: Mike Morrison (2nd season)
- Home stadium: Bob "Turtle" Smith Stadium

2023 Big Ten Conference baseball standings
	Conf.						Overall
Team	W		L		T	PCT	W		L		T	PCT
Maryland ‍†‍‡‍^{y}	17	–	7	–	0	.708	42	–	19	–	0	.689
Indiana ‍‍‍^{y}	16	–	8	–	0	.667	41	–	18	–	0	.695
Iowa ‍‍‍^{y}	15	–	8	–	0	.652	43	–	14	–	0	.754
Nebraska ‍‍‍	15	–	9	–	0	.625	33	–	23	–	1	.588
Rutgers ‍‍‍	14	–	10	–	0	.583	33	–	23	–	0	.589
Michigan ‍‍‍	13	–	11	–	0	.542	28	–	28	–	0	.500
Michigan State ‍‍‍	12	–	12	–	0	.500	33	–	22	–	0	.600
Illinois ‍‍‍	12	–	12	–	0	.500	25	–	27	–	0	.481
Purdue ‍‍‍	11	–	13	–	0	.458	24	–	29	–	0	.453
Minnesota ‍‍‍	10	–	14	–	0	.417	18	–	34	–	0	.346
Ohio State ‍‍‍	9	–	15	–	0	.375	31	–	25	–	0	.554
Penn State ‍‍‍	7	–	16	–	0	.304	25	–	25	–	0	.500
Northwestern ‍‍‍	4	–	20	–	0	.167	10	–	40	–	0	.200
† – Conference champion ‡ – Tournament champion y – Invited to the NCAA tournament As of June 2, 2023; Rankings from D1Baseball

The 2023 Maryland Terrapins baseball team was a baseball team that represented the University of Maryland, College Park in the 2023 NCAA Division I baseball season. The Terrapins were members of the Big Ten Conference and played their home games at Bob "Turtle" Smith Stadium in College Park, Maryland. They were led by sixth-year head coach Rob Vaughn.

Maryland won their second consecutive Big Ten regular season title and won the Big Ten conference tournament title as well.

== Roster ==
2023 Maryland Terrapins baseball team
Players
Coaches

#	Pos.	Name	B/T	Height	Weight	Year	Previous school	Home town
1	INF	Jacob Orr	/	5 ft 9 in (1.75 m)	170 lb (77 kg)	So	Thomas Johnson H.S.	Frederick, Maryland
3	C	Luke Shliger	/	5 ft 9 in (1.75 m)	180 lb (82 kg)	Jr	Trinity-Pawling School	Danbury, Connecticut
4	INF	Alex Irizarry	/	5 ft 10 in (1.78 m)	175 lb (79 kg)	Fr	East Catholic H.S.	Tolland, Connecticut
5	LHP	Andrew Johnson	/L	6 ft 0 in (1.83 m)	200 lb (91 kg)	So	Glenelg H.S.	Mount Airy, Maryland
6	INF	Matt Shaw	/	5 ft 11 in (1.8 m)	185 lb (84 kg)	Jr	Worcester Academy	Brimfield, Massachusetts
7	INF	Caleb Estes	/	6 ft 3 in (1.91 m)	195 lb (88 kg)	Fr	Archbishop Spalding H.S.	Severn, Maryland
8	INF	Kevin Keister	/	5 ft 9 in (1.75 m)	180 lb (82 kg)	Jr	Caravel Academy	Smyrna, Delaware
9	INF	Simmi Whitehill	/	6 ft 0 in (1.83 m)	176 lb (80 kg)	Fr	Bishop Shanahan H.S.	Exton, Pennsylvania
10	RHP	Joey Colucci	/R	6 ft 5 in (1.96 m)	210 lb (95 kg)	Fr	Woodgrove H.S.	Purcellville, Virginia
11	OF	Elijah Lambros	/	6 ft 2 in (1.88 m)	195 lb (88 kg)	So	South Carolina	Fredericksburg, Virginia
12	C	Devin Russell	/	6 ft 1 in (1.85 m)	195 lb (88 kg)	Fr	Mountain Lakes H.S.	Boonton Township, New Jersey
13	INF	Matt Orlando	/	6 ft 0 in (1.83 m)	180 lb (82 kg)	Sr	Los Osos H. S.	Marlton, New Jersey
14	RHP	Wagner Morrissette	/R	6 ft 3 in (1.91 m)	190 lb (86 kg)	Fr	The Burlington School	Whitsett, North Carolina
15	OF	Zach Martin	/	6 ft 0 in (1.83 m)	185 lb (84 kg)	So	Middletown H. S.	Middletown, Maryland
16	RHP	Eliakim Stowe	/R	6 ft 3 in (1.91 m)	215 lb (98 kg)	Fr	Milbrook H.S.	Poughkeepsie, New York
17	LHP	Andrew Brock	/L	6 ft 2 in (1.88 m)	215 lb (98 kg)	Fr	Cincinnati Hills Christian Academy	Cincinnati, Ohio
18		Jake Walman	/	5 ft 11 in (1.8 m)	185 lb (84 kg)	Fr	St. John Paul H.S.	Bourne, Massachusetts
21	RHP	Kenny Lippman	/R	6 ft 4 in (1.93 m)	210 lb (95 kg)	Sr	Denison	McLean, Virginia
22	LHP	Kyle McCoy	/L	6 ft 5 in (1.96 m)	180 lb (82 kg)	Fr	Hunterdon Central H. S.	Ringoes, New Jersey
23	OF	Ian Petrutz	/	6 ft 0 in (1.83 m)	190 lb (86 kg)	So	Eustace Preparatory School	Mantua Township, New Jersey
24	OF	Matt Woods	/	6 ft 1 in (1.85 m)	200 lb (91 kg)	Sr	Bryant	Warwick, Rhode Island
26	RHP	Nate Haberthier	/R	6 ft 5 in (1.96 m)	245 lb (111 kg)	Jr	Ohio State	West Chester, Ohio
28	RHP	David Falco	/R	6 ft 4 in (1.93 m)	235 lb (107 kg)	RS Jr	Center Moriches H.S.	Center Moriches, New York
29	LHP	Michael Walsh	/L	6 ft 1 in (1.85 m)	180 lb (82 kg)	So	Riverside H. S.	Leesburg, Virginia
31	LHP	Tommy Kane	/L	6 ft 1 in (1.85 m)	180 lb (82 kg)	Jr	Rowan College	Broomall, Pennsylvania
32	OF	Luke Zeisloft	/	5 ft 11 in (1.8 m)	180 lb (82 kg)	Fr	Central Columbia H.S.	Bloomsburg, Pennsylvania
33	LHP	Travis Garnett	/L	6 ft 6 in (1.98 m)	230 lb (104 kg)	RS Fr	Indian Creek School	Pasadena, Maryland
34	INF	Nick Lorusso	/	6 ft 2 in (1.88 m)	215 lb (98 kg)	Sr	Masuk H. S.	Monroe, Connecticut
35	RHP	Ryan Van Buren	/R	6 ft 3 in (1.91 m)	180 lb (82 kg)	So	Abington H. S.	Abington, Pennsylvania
37		Logan Ott	/L	5 ft 11 in (1.8 m)	190 lb (86 kg)	Jr	Montoursville Area H. S.	Montoursville, Pennsylvania
38	C	James Heffley	/	5 ft 11 in (1.8 m)	170 lb (77 kg)	RS Jr	Albert Einstein H. S.	Kensington, Maryland
39	INF	Eddie Hacopian	/	6 ft 3 in (1.91 m)	190 lb (86 kg)	So	Cypress College	Potomac, Maryland
40	INF	Michael Bouma	/	6 ft 1 in (1.85 m)	210 lb (95 kg)	Sr	Sherwood H. S.	Brookeville, Maryland
41	OF	Bobby Zmarzlak	/	6 ft 5 in (1.96 m)	205 lb (93 kg)	Sr	Westhill H. S.	Stamford, Connecticut
42	RHP	Nick Dean	/R	6 ft 3 in (1.91 m)	180 lb (82 kg)	Sr	Bensalem H. S.	Bensalem, Pennsylvania
43	RHP	Thomas Rogers	/R	6 ft 6 in (1.98 m)	185 lb (84 kg)	Fr	Lincoln-Sudbury H.S.	Sudbury, New Jersey
44	RHP	Nigel Belgrave	/R	6 ft 4 in (1.93 m)	195 lb (88 kg)	RS So	Auburn H. S.	Auburn, Massachusetts
45	RHP	Jason Savacool	/R	6 ft 1 in (1.85 m)	210 lb (95 kg)	Jr	Charles W. Baker H. S.	Baldwinsville, New York

Head coach

Rob Vaughn

Assistant coach(es)

Hitting coach(es)

Matt Swope

Base coach(es)

Anthony Papio

Pitching coach(es)

Mike Morrison

Legend

- (C) Team captain
- (S) Suspended
- (I) Ineligible
- Injured
- Current redshirt

Roster

== Schedule ==
2023 Maryland Terrapins baseball game log
Regular season (42–21)
February (4–4)

#	Date	Rank	Opponent	Site/stadium	Score	Win	Loss	Save	Attendance	Overall record	B1G record
1	February 17	13	at USF	USF Baseball Stadium • Tampa, Florida	7–8	Mink (1–0)	Savacool (0–1)	None	1,647	0–1	–
2	February 18	13	at USF	USF Baseball Stadium • Tampa, Florida	8–1	Dean (1–0)	Hudi (0–1)	McCoy (1)	1,421	1–1	–
3	February 19	13	at USF	USF Baseball Stadium • Tampa, Florida	9–5	Haberthier (1–0)	Grause (0–1)	Lippman (1)	1,268	2–1	–
4	February 21	13	West Virginia	Bob "Turtle" Smith Stadium • College Park, Maryland	6–8	Porco (1–0)	Van Buren (0–1)	Allen (1)	1,278	2–2	–
5	February 24	13	at Ole Miss	Swayze Field • Oxford, Mississippi	9–2	Savacool (1–1)	Dougherty (0–1)	None	9,993	3–2	–
6	February 25	13	at Ole Miss	Swayze Field • Oxford, Mississippi	6–12	Quinn (2–0)	McCoy (0–1)	Nichols (1)	10,778	3–3	–
7	February 26	13	at Ole Miss	Swayze Field • Oxford, Mississippi	8–18	Rivas (2–0)	Haberthier (1–1)	Jones (1)	10,115	3–4	–
8	February 28	18	Delaware	Bob "Turtle" Smith Stadium • College Park, Maryland	8–3	Ott (1–0)	Nelson (0–1)	None	1,312	4–4	–

March (12–5)

#	Date	Rank	Opponent	Site/stadium	Score	Win	Loss	Save	Attendance	Overall record	B1G record
9	March 3	18	Ole Miss	U.S. Bank Stadium • Minneapolis, Minnesota	1–5	Dougherty (1–1)	Savacool (1–2)	Nichols (2)	550	4–5	–
10	March 4	18	Vanderbilt	U.S. Bank Stadium • Minneapolis, Minnesota	7–8	Maldonado (1–0)	McCoy (0–2)	None	–	4–6	–
11	March 5	18	Hawaii	U.S. Bank Stadium • Minneapolis, Minnesota	3–9	Zeigler-Namoa (2–0)	Haberthier (1–2)	Harrison (2)	–	4–7	–
12	March 7		UMBC	Bob "Turtle" Smith Stadium • College Park, Maryland	12–6	Ott (2–0)	Craig (0–1)	None	626	5–7	–
13	March 10		Maine	Bob "Turtle" Smith Stadium • College Park, Maryland	25–10	Savacool (2–2)	Fitzgerald (0–1)	None	766	6–7	–
14	March 11		Maine	Bob "Turtle" Smith Stadium • College Park, Maryland	5–4	Belgrave (1–0)	Scott (0–2)	None	931	7–7	–
15	March 12		Maine	Bob "Turtle" Smith Stadium • College Park, Maryland	9–1	Haberthier (2–2)	Lewis (0–1)	None	884	8–7	–
16	March 15		at Delaware	Bob Hannah Stadium • Newark, Delaware	13–11	Belgrave (2–0)	Frake (1–1)	Falco (1)	184	9–7	–
17	March 17		Albany	Bob "Turtle" Smith Stadium • College Park, Maryland	18–3	Savacool (3–2)	Scherrer (0–1)	None	684	10–7	–
18	March 18		Albany	Bob "Turtle" Smith Stadium • College Park, Maryland	3–6	Eisenmann (1–1)	Dean (1–1)	Banner (1)	981	10–8	–
19	March 19		Albany	Bob "Turtle" Smith Stadium • College Park, Maryland	4–0	McCoy (1–2)	Quinn (0–1)	Haberthier (1)	638	11–8	–
20	March 21		George Washington	Bob "Turtle" Smith Stadium • College Park, Maryland	9–6	Falco (1–0)	Kurtz (0–1)	None	515	12–8	–
21	March 24		at UCF	John Euliano Park • Orlando, Florida	2–4	Gomez (4–0)	Savacool (3–3)	Kramer (6)	2,150	12–9	–
22	March 25		at UCF	John Euliano Park • Orlando, Florida	16–6	Lippman (1–0)	Stagliano (4–1)	None	2,202	13–9	–
23	March 26		at UCF	John Euliano Park • Orlando, Florida	8–6	McCoy (2–2)	Marlowe (3–2)	None	1,773	14–9	–
24	March 28		Georgetown	Bob "Turtle" Smith Stadium • College Park, Maryland	10–7	Johnson (1–0)	Yoder (2–1)	Van Buren (1)	879	15–9	–
25	March 31		at Iowa	Duane Banks Field • Iowa City, Iowa	10–9	Belgrave (3–0)	Simpson (0–1)	Falco (2)	238	16–9	1–0

April (14–6)

#	Date	Rank	Opponent	Site/stadium	Score	Win	Loss	Save	Attendance	Overall record	B1G record
26	April 1		at Iowa	Duane Banks Field • Iowa City, Iowa	7–4	Falco (2–0)	Morgan (0–1)	Kane (1)	560	17–9	2–0
27	April 2		at Iowa	Duane Banks Field • Iowa City, Iowa	8–12	Henderson (1–0)	McCoy (2–3)	Obermueller (1)	512	17–10	2–1
28	April 4		William & Mary	Bob "Turtle" Smith Stadium • College Park, Maryland	3–13	Pierce (4–1)	Van Buren (0–2)	Prarie (4)	1,148	17–11	2–1
29	April 7		Rutgers	Bob "Turtle" Smith Stadium • College Park, Maryland	6–4	Kane (1–0)	Conover (2–3)	Belgrave (1)	1,165	18–11	3–1
30	April 8		Rutgers	Bob "Turtle" Smith Stadium • College Park, Maryland	4–3	Dean (2–1)	Mazza (0–2)	Falco (3)	1,660	19–11	4–1
31	April 9		Rutgers	Bob "Turtle" Smith Stadium • College Park, Maryland	8–14	Modugno (1–0)	McCoy (2–4)	None	849	19–12	4–2
32	April 11		Georgetown	Bob "Turtle" Smith Stadium • College Park, Maryland	9–10	Catlett (1–1)	Van Buren (1–2)	None	489	19–13	4–2
33	April 14		Ohio State	Bill Davis Stadium • Columbus, Ohio	7–5	Savacool (4–3)	Bruni (2–1)	Falco (4)	1,246	20–13	5–2
34	April 15		Ohio State	Bill Davis Stadium • Columbus, Ohio	3–2	Lippman (2–0)	Beidelschies (0–2)	Falco (5)	2,261	21–13	6–2
35	April 16		Ohio State	Bill Davis Stadium • Columbus, Ohio	8–13	Eisenhardt (2–2)	McCoy (2–5)	None	848	21–14	6–3
36	April 18		at George Washington	Barcroft Park • Arlington, Virginia	15–8	Lippman (3–0)	Wilson (1–3)	None	175	22–14	6–3
37	April 19		James Madison	Bob "Turtle" Smith Stadium • College Park, Maryland	19–12	Belgrave (4–0)	Czerwinski (0–1)	None	1,189	23–14	6–3
38	April 21		Purdue	Bob "Turtle" Smith Stadium • College Park, Maryland	8–10	Stephen (5–2)	Savacool (4–4)	Dannelley (2)	1,092	23–15	6–4
39	April 22		Purdue	Bob "Turtle" Smith Stadium • College Park, Maryland	6–5	McCoy (3–5)	Blackwell (4–3)	Belgrave (2)	1,040	24–15	7–4
40	April 23		Purdue	Bob "Turtle" Smith Stadium • College Park, Maryland	10–8	Lippman (4–0)	Iwinski (2–4)	Falco (6)	1,482	25–15	8–4
41	April 25		at UMBC	The Baseball Factory Field at UMBC • Catonsville, Maryland	24–11	Colucci (1–0)	Pucek (2–2)	None	496	26–15	8–4
42	April 26		at Georgetown	Shirley Povich Field • Washington, DC	16–3	Kane (2–0)	Garner (1–1)	None	347	27–15	8–4
43	April 28		at Indiana	Bart Kaufman Field • Bloomington, Indiana	13–2	Dean (3–1)	Manase (2–2)	None	1,653	28–15	9–4
44	April 29		at Indiana	Bart Kaufman Field • Bloomington, Indiana	16–2	McCoy (4–5)	Sinnard (4–2)	None	1,791	29–15	10–4
45	April 30		at Indiana	Bart Kaufman Field • Bloomington, Indiana	14–8	Lippman (5–0)	Foley (2–1)	Falco (7)	1,535	30–15	11–4

May (7–4)

#	Date	Rank	Opponent	Site/stadium	Score	Win	Loss	Save	Attendance	Overall record	B1G record
46	May 3	23	at Delaware	Bob Hannah Stadium • Newark, Delaware	19–7	Van Buren (1–3)	Rolka (1–4)	None	112	31–15	11–4
47	May 5	23	Nebraska	Bob "Turtle" Smith Stadium • College Park, Maryland	8–4	Lippman (6–0)	Olson (5–3)	None	1,021	32–15	12–4
48	May 6	23	Nebraska	Bob "Turtle" Smith Stadium • College Park, Maryland	10–12	Schanaman (3–4)	McCoy (4–6)	None	1,823	32–16	12–5
49	May 7	23	Nebraska	Bob "Turtle" Smith Stadium • College Park, Maryland	20–5	Savacool (5–4)	Christo (1–1)	None	1,508	33–16	13–5
50	May 9	23	Northeastern	Bob "Turtle" Smith Stadium • College Park, Maryland	2–9	Gemma (1–0)	Lippman (6–1)	None	479	33–17	13–5
51	May 12	19	Minnesota	Bob "Turtle" Smith Stadium • College Park, Maryland	8–7	Novotny (3–5)	Haberthier (2–3)	Wietgrefe (4)	1,061	33–18	13–6
52	May 13	19	Minnesota	Bob "Turtle" Smith Stadium • College Park, Maryland	14–5	Savacool (6–4)	Klassen (1–7)	None	623	34–18	14–6
53	May 14	19	Minnesota	Bob "Turtle" Smith Stadium • College Park, Maryland	15–9	Ott (3–0)	Hokenson (0–1)	Falco (8)	762	35–18	15–6
54	May 18	20	at Penn State	Medlar Field at Lubrano Park • University Park, Pennsylvania	17-15	Falco (3–0)	Luensmann (6-5)	None	572	36–18	16–6
55	May 19	20	at Penn State	Medlar Field at Lubrano Park • University Park, Pennsylvania	3–5	Molsky (3–4)	Savacool (6–5)	Partridge (1)	811	36–19	16–7
56	May 20	20	at Penn State	Medlar Field at Lubrano Park • University Park, Pennsylvania	7–4	Lippman (7–1)	Partridge (1–2)	Falco (9)	564	37–19	17–7

Postseason
Big Ten Conference Tournament (4–0)

#	Date	Rank	Opponent	Site/stadium	Score	Win	Loss	Save	Attendance	Overall record	B1G record
57	May 23		Michigan State	Charles Schwab Field Omaha • Omaha, Nebraska	3–2	Falco (4–0)	Powers (5–3)	None	–	38–19	17–7
58	May 25		Nebraska	Charles Schwab Field Omaha • Omaha, Nebraska	2–1	Savacool (7–5)	Schanaman (3–6)	None	8,340	39–19	17–7
59	May 27		vs Nebraska	Charles Schwab Field Omaha • Omaha, Nebraska	4–2	Savacool (8–5)	Brockett (2–2)	Johnson (1)	9,105	40–19	17–7
60	May 28		Iowa	Charles Schwab Field Omaha • Omaha, Nebraska	4–0	Lippman (8–1)	Whitlock (7–1)	None	–	41–19	17–7

Winston-Salem Regional (1–2)

#	Date	Rank	Opponent	Site/stadium	Score	Win	Loss	Save	Attendance	Overall record	B1G record
61	June 2	19	Northeastern	David F. Couch Ballpark • Winston-Salem, North Carolina	7–2	Savacool (9–5)	Scotti (6–5)	None	1,003	42–19	17–7
62	June 3	19	vs Wake Forest	David F. Couch Ballpark • Winston-Salem, North Carolina	6–21	Lowder (14–0)	Dean (3–2)	None	2,425	42–20	17–7
63	June 4	19	vs George Mason	David F. Couch Ballpark • Winston-Salem, North Carolina	10–11	Smith (2–0)	Falco (4–1)	None	781	42–21	17–7
