= 2023 Michigan State Spartans baseball team =

College baseball team season

2023 Michigan State Spartans baseball
- Conference: Big Ten Conference
- Record: 33–22 (12–12 Big Ten)
- Head coach: Jake Boss (15th season)
- Assistant coaches: Graham Sikes (14th season); Andrew Stone (2nd season)
- Pitching coach: Mark Van Ameyde (6th season)
- Home stadium: Drayton McLane Baseball Stadium at John H. Kobs Field

2023 Big Ten Conference baseball standings
	Conf.						Overall
Team	W		L		T	PCT	W		L		T	PCT
Maryland ‍†‍‡‍^{y}	17	–	7	–	0	.708	42	–	19	–	0	.689
Indiana ‍‍‍^{y}	16	–	8	–	0	.667	41	–	18	–	0	.695
Iowa ‍‍‍^{y}	15	–	8	–	0	.652	43	–	14	–	0	.754
Nebraska ‍‍‍	15	–	9	–	0	.625	33	–	23	–	1	.588
Rutgers ‍‍‍	14	–	10	–	0	.583	33	–	23	–	0	.589
Michigan ‍‍‍	13	–	11	–	0	.542	28	–	28	–	0	.500
Michigan State ‍‍‍	12	–	12	–	0	.500	33	–	22	–	0	.600
Illinois ‍‍‍	12	–	12	–	0	.500	25	–	27	–	0	.481
Purdue ‍‍‍	11	–	13	–	0	.458	24	–	29	–	0	.453
Minnesota ‍‍‍	10	–	14	–	0	.417	18	–	34	–	0	.346
Ohio State ‍‍‍	9	–	15	–	0	.375	31	–	25	–	0	.554
Penn State ‍‍‍	7	–	16	–	0	.304	25	–	25	–	0	.500
Northwestern ‍‍‍	4	–	20	–	0	.167	10	–	40	–	0	.200
† – Conference champion ‡ – Tournament champion y – Invited to the NCAA tournament As of June 2, 2023; Rankings from D1Baseball

The 2023 Michigan State Spartans baseball team represented Michigan State University in the 2023 NCAA Division I baseball season. The Spartans were led by head coach Jake Boss in his fifteenth-season, were a member of the Big Ten Conference and played their home games at Drayton McLane Baseball Stadium at John H. Kobs Field in East Lansing, Michigan.

== Previous season ==
The Spartans finished the 2022 season 24–30, including 8–16 in conference play, finishing in twelve place in their conference.

== All-Big Ten ==
Six Spartans received conference honors in 2023 - junior infielder Brock Vradenburg collected First Team All-Big Ten honors, while senior relief pitcher Wyatt Rush, junior infielder Trent Farquhar and redshirt sophomore catcher Bryan Broecker were named to Second Team All-Big Ten. Junior infielder Mitch Jebb was tabbed to the Third Team All-Big Ten list, while pitcher Joseph Dzierwa was named to the Big Ten All-Freshman Team. Wyatt Rush was also named MSU's Sportsmanship Award honoree.

== Schedule and results ==
2023 Michigan State Spartans baseball game log
Regular season (32–20)

February (4–3)
#	Date	Opponent	Rank	Site/stadium	TV	Score	Win	Loss	Save	Attendance	Overall Record	B1G Record
1	February 17	vs. Michigan; MLB Desert Invitational		Sloan Park	MLB.com	15–8	**Dzierwa** (1–0)	Goldensoph (0–1)	**Rush** (1)	305	1–0	–
2	February 19	vs. Fresno State; MLB Desert Invitational		Salt River Fields at Talking Stick	MLB.com	7–4	**Pisnto** (1–0)	Angelo (0–1)	—	480	2–0	–
3	February 19	vs. Arizona; MLB Desert Invitational		Salt River Fields at Talking Stick	MLB.com	1–7	Zastrow (1–0)	**Matheny** (0–1)	—	503	2–1	–
4	February 20	at Grand Canyon		Brazell Field at GCU Ballpark	ESPN+	7–1	**Carson** (1–0)	Martinez (0–1)	—	1,928	3–1	–
5	February 24	at USC Upstate		Cleveland S. Harley Baseball Park	ESPN+	13–6	**Dzierwa** (2–0)	Dutton (1–1)	—	97	4–1	–
6	February 25	at Gardner–Webb Runnin'		John Henry Moss Stadium		3–7	Switalski (1–1)	**Matheny** (0–2)	Maggi (1)	72	4–2	–
7	February 26	at Presbyterian		Presbyterian Baseball Complex		6–8	McDaniel (1–1)	**Szczepaniak** (0–1)	Smith (2)	250	4–3	–

March (11–5)
#	Date	Opponent	Rank	Site/stadium	TV	Score	Win	Loss	Save	Attendance	Overall Record	B1G Record
8	March 3	at College of Charleston		CofC Baseball Stadium at Patriot's Point	FloSports	3–11	Hunter (2–1)	**Dzierwa** (2–1)	—	712	4–4	–
9	March 4	at Charleston Southern		Nielsen Field at CSU Ballpark	ESPN+	19–10	**Higgins** (1–0)	Gleason (1–2)	—	202	5–4	–
10	March 5	at College of Charleston		CofC Baseball Stadium at Patriot's Point	FloSports	3–10	Duval (2–0)	**Cook** (0–1)	Hunter (1)	868	5–5	–
11	March 6	vs. Air Force		Shipyard Park		4–7	Jake (1–1)	**Carson** (1–1)	—	305	5–6	–
12	March 8	vs. Wofford		Fluor Field		9–12	Zac (3–0)	**Higgins** (1–1)	—	305	5–7	–
13	March 10	vs. Western Carolina; First Pitch Invitational		Fluor Field	YouTube	6–5	**Rush** (1–0)	Torres (1–1)	—	503	6–7	–
14	March 11	vs. Kansas; First Pitch Invitational		Fluor Field	YouTube	10–6	**Carson** (2–1)	Muck (0–1)	—	2,428	7–7	–
15	March 11	vs. Western Carolina; First Pitch Invitational		Fluor Field	YouTube	7–2	**Berghorst** (1–0)	Eldridge (0–2)	**Rush** (2)	503	8–7	–
—	March 12	vs. Kansas; First Pitch Invitational		Fluor Field		Cancelled						
—	March 17	at Indiana State		Bob Warn Field at Sycamore Stadium		Cancelled						
—	March 18	at Indiana State		Bob Warn Field at Sycamore Stadium		Postponed						
16	March 19	at Indiana State		Bob Warn Field at Sycamore Stadium	ESPN+	8–2	**Higgins** (2–1)	Fenlong (1–2)	—	731	9–7	–
17	March 19	at Indiana State		Bob Warn Field at Sycamore Stadium	ESPN+	10–7	**Cook** (1–1)	Gregersen (1–1)	**Rush** (3)	596	10–7	–
18	March 22	vs. Western Michigan		Drayton McLane Baseball Stadium	B1G+	8–3	**Powers** (1–0)	Szczepaniak (0–1)	—	305	11–7	–
19	March 24	vs. Purdue		Drayton McLane Baseball Stadium	BTN	4–5	Suval (3–1)	**Carson** (2–2)	—	703	11–8	0–1
–	March 25	vs. Purdue		Drayton McLane Baseball Stadium		Postponed						
20	March 26	vs. Purdue		Drayton McLane Baseball Stadium	B1G+	5–4	**Szczepaniak** (1–1)	Dannelley (1–3)	**Rush** (4)	—	12–8	1–1
21	March 26	vs. Purdue		Drayton McLane Baseball Stadium	B1G+	12–6	**Cook** (2–1)	Iwinski (1–2)	—	1,024	13–8	2–1
22	March 28	at Western Michigan		Hyames Field	wmubroncos.com	8–6	**Martin** (1–0)	Gernon (0–1)	**Rush** (5)	319	14–8	–
23	March 31	at Rutgers		Bainton Field	B1G+	3–2	**Dzierwa** (3–1)	Conover (2–2)	**Rush** (6)	421	15–8	3–1

April (13–5)
#	Date	Opponent	Rank	Site/stadium	TV	Score	Win	Loss	Save	Attendance	Overall Record	B1G Record
24	April 1	at Rutgers		Bainton Field	B1G+	10–4	**Cook** (3–1)	Coppola (1–3)	—	501	16–8	4–1
25	April 2	at Rutgers		Bainton Field	B1G+	5–10	Gorski (1–0)	**Carson** (2–3)	—	521	16–9	4–2
—	April 5	vs. Bowling Green		Drayton McLane Baseball Stadium		Postponed						
26	April 7	vs. Ohio State		Jackson Field		7–1	**Dzierwa** (4–1)	Coupet (3–3)	**Carson** (1)	1,423	17–9	5–2
27	April 8	vs. Ohio State		Jackson Field		2–13 (7)	Bruni (2–0)	**Cook** (3–2)	—	—	17–10	5–3
28	April 8	vs. Ohio State		Jackson Field		16–3 (7)	**Powers** (2–0)	Timmerman (0–1)	—	1,002	18–10	6–3
29	April 11	at Notre Dame		Frank Eck Stadium	ESPN	7–6 (11)	**Rush** (2–0)	Lynch (0–1)	—	572	19–10	–
30	April 12	vs. Oakland		Drayton McLane Baseball Stadium	B1G+	8–3	**Higgins** (3–1)	Fekete (1–2)	—	1,541	20–10	–
31	April 14	vs. Western Illinois		Drayton McLane Baseball Stadium	B1G+	10–9	**Carson** (3–3)	Bell (0–3)	**Rush** (7)	1,196	21–10	–
32	April 15	vs. Western Illinois		Drayton McLane Baseball Stadium	B1G+	12–2 (7)	**Cook** (4–2)	Kapraun (1–5)	—	—	22–10	–
33	April 15	vs. Western Illinois		Drayton McLane Baseball Stadium	B1G+	11–1 (8)	**Powers** (3–0)	Kratz (0–3)	—	1,935	23–10	–
34	April 19	vs. Purdue Fort Wayne		Drayton McLane Baseball Stadium	B1G+	2–3	Reid (2–2)	**Berghorst** (1–1)	Miller (4)	503	23–11	–
35	April 21	at Michigan		Ray Fisher Stadium	B1G+	3–5	Rennard (6–2)	**Dzierwa** (4–2)	Voit (4)	1,766	23–12	6–4
36	April 22	at Michigan		Fisher Stadium	B1G+	3–8	O'Halloran (7–2)	**Cook** (4–3)	—	1,960	23–13	6–5
37	April 23	at Michigan		Fisher Stadium	B1G+	14–2	**Powers** (4–0)	Allen (4–3)	—	2,595	24–13	7–5
38	April 25	vs. Notre Dame		Drayton McLane Baseball Stadium	B1G+	12–5	**Rush** (3–0)	Bedford (1–2)	—	1,033	25–13	–
—	April 28	vs. Northwestern		Drayton McLane Baseball Stadium		Postponed						
39	April 29	vs. Northwestern		Drayton McLane Baseball Stadium	B1G+	8–3	**Dzierwa** (5–2)	McClure (1–6)	**Cook** (1)	—	26–13	8–5
40	April 29	vs. Northwestern		Drayton McLane Baseball Stadium	B1G+	6–3	**Higgins** (4–1)	Garewal (0–4)	**Rush** (8)	1,053	27–13	9–5
41	April 30	vs. Northwestern		Drayton McLane Baseball Stadium	B1G+	9–2	**Powers** (5–0)	Benneche (0–6)	—	1,102	28–13	10–5

May (4–7)
#	Date	Opponent	Rank	Site/stadium	TV	Score	Win	Loss	Save	Attendance	Overall Record	B1G Record
42	May 5	at Illinois		Illinois Field	B1G+	9–10	Crowder (3–2)	**Szczepaniak** (1–2)	—	2,113	28–14	10–6
43	May 6	at Illinois		Illinois Field	B1G+	7–14	Swartz (2–2)	**Higgins** (4–2)	—	947	28–15	10–7
44	May 7	at Illinois		Illinois Field	B1G+	3–10	Constertina (2–2)	**Powers** (5–1)	—	947	28–16	10–8
45	May 10	vs. Eastern Michigan		Drayton McLane Baseball Stadium	B1G+	11–10 (10)	**Rush** (4–0)	Chittum (3–5)	—	628	29–16	–
46	May 12	at Iowa		Duane Banks Field	B1G+	0–9	Morgan (4–2)	**Dzierwa** (5–3)	Simpson (1)	1,778	29–17	10–9
47	May 13	at Iowa		Duane Banks Field	B1G+	6–8	Christophers (3–1)	**Carson** (3–4)	Llewellyn (3)	1,249	29–18	10–10
48	May 14	at Iowa		Duane Banks Field	B1G+	1–5	Brecht (4–2)	**Powers** (5–2)	Whitlock (1)	1,221	29–19	10–11
49	May 16	vs. Central Michigan		Drayton McLane Baseball Stadium	B1G+	9–2	**Chapman** (1–0)	Waters (4–1)	—	719	30–19	–
50	May 18	vs. Indiana		Drayton McLane Baseball Stadium	BTN	8–6	**Dzierwa** (6–3)	Sinnard (6–3)	**Rush** (9)	621	31–19	11–11
51	May 19	vs. Indiana		Drayton McLane Baseball Stadium	BTN	7–6	**Cook** (5–3)	Risedorph (2–1)	**Rush** (10)	608	32–19	12–11
52	May 20	vs. Indiana		Drayton McLane Baseball Stadium	BTN	5–6	Hayden (2–0)	**Szczepaniak** (1–3)	Foley (3)	1,391	32–20	12–12

Postseason (1–2)

B1G Ten Tournament (1–2)
#	Date	Opponent	Rank	Site/stadium	TV	Score	Win	Loss	Save	Attendance	Overall Record	B1GT Record
53	May 23	vs.(1) Maryland	(8)	Charles Schwab Field	BTN	2–3	Falco (4–0)	**Powers** (5–3)	—	2,037	32–21	0–1
54	May 25	vs.(5) Rutgers	(8)	Charles Schwab Field	BTN	6–4	**Rush** (5–0)	Marshall (5–2)	—	—	33–21	1–1
55	May 26	vs.(4) Nebraska	(8)	Charles Schwab Field	BTN	0–4	Walsh (5–3)	**Dzierwa** (6–4)	—	5,317	33–22	1–2

- Win
- Loss
- Postponement
- Bold: Spartans team member
- Rankings from D1Baseball.com.
- (#) Tournament seedings in parentheses.
