= 2023 Purdue Boilermakers baseball team =

American college baseball season

2023 Purdue Boilermakers baseball
- Conference: Big Ten Conference
- Record: 24–29 (11–13 B1G)
- Head coach: Greg Goff (4th season)
- Hitting coach: Terry Rooney (2nd season)
- Pitching coach: Chris Marx (4th season)
- Home stadium: Alexander Field

2023 Big Ten Conference baseball standings
	Conf.						Overall
Team	W		L		T	PCT	W		L		T	PCT
Maryland ‍†‍‡‍^{y}	17	–	7	–	0	.708	42	–	19	–	0	.689
Indiana ‍‍‍^{y}	16	–	8	–	0	.667	41	–	18	–	0	.695
Iowa ‍‍‍^{y}	15	–	8	–	0	.652	43	–	14	–	0	.754
Nebraska ‍‍‍	15	–	9	–	0	.625	33	–	23	–	1	.588
Rutgers ‍‍‍	14	–	10	–	0	.583	33	–	23	–	0	.589
Michigan ‍‍‍	13	–	11	–	0	.542	28	–	28	–	0	.500
Michigan State ‍‍‍	12	–	12	–	0	.500	33	–	22	–	0	.600
Illinois ‍‍‍	12	–	12	–	0	.500	25	–	27	–	0	.481
Purdue ‍‍‍	11	–	13	–	0	.458	24	–	29	–	0	.453
Minnesota ‍‍‍	10	–	14	–	0	.417	18	–	34	–	0	.346
Ohio State ‍‍‍	9	–	15	–	0	.375	31	–	25	–	0	.554
Penn State ‍‍‍	7	–	16	–	0	.304	25	–	25	–	0	.500
Northwestern ‍‍‍	4	–	20	–	0	.167	10	–	40	–	0	.200
† – Conference champion ‡ – Tournament champion y – Invited to the NCAA tournament As of June 2, 2023; Rankings from D1Baseball

The Purdue Boilermakers baseball team was a baseball team that represented Purdue University in the 2023 NCAA Division I baseball season. The Boilermakers were members of the Big Ten Conference and played their home games at Alexander Field in West Lafayette, Indiana. They were led by fourth-year head coach Greg Goff.

== Previous season ==
The Boilermakers finished the 2022 NCAA Division I baseball season 29–21 overall (9–12 conference) and seventh place in the conference standings, qualifying for the 2022 Big Ten Conference Baseball Tournament, where they were eliminated after going 0–2.

== Preseason ==
Following the season, Daniel Furuto left to take a position with Abilene Christian, but Purdue did not replace him.

== Roster ==
2023 Purdue Boilermakers baseball team
Players
Coaches

#	Pos.	Name	B/T	Height	Weight	Year	Previous school	Home town
1	OF	Mike Bolton Jr.	L/R	5 ft 9 in (1.75 m)	160 lb (73 kg)	Sr	Brother Rice H. S.	Calumet City, Illinois
2	INF	Ty Gill	L/R	6 ft 2 in (1.88 m)	155 lb (70 kg)	So	Valparaiso H. S.	Valparaiso, Indiana
3	INF	Jo Stevens	R/R	6 ft 2 in (1.88 m)	210 lb (95 kg)	Jr	Yavapai College	Mount Colah, Australia
4	UTL	Cam Thompson	R/R	6 ft 2 in (1.88 m)	200 lb (91 kg)	RS Jr	Owasso High School	Owasso, Oklahoma
5	INF	Evan Albrecht	R/R	5 ft 10 in (1.78 m)	170 lb (77 kg)	RS Sr	West Bend West H. S.	West Bend, Wisconsin
6	OF	Weston Gingerich	L/L	5 ft 10 in (1.78 m)	160 lb (73 kg)	RS So	St. Theodore Guerin H. S.	Carmel, Indiana
7	OF	Sam Franco	R/R	6 ft 1 in (1.85 m)	210 lb (95 kg)	Sr	Clarkstown H. S. South	Bardonia, New York
8	RHP	Davis Pratt	R/R	6 ft 2 in (1.88 m)	205 lb (93 kg)	Jr	Temple College	Albuquerque, New Mexico
9	OF	Camden Melvin	L/L	6 ft 0 in (1.83 m)	205 lb (93 kg)	So	New Mexico Junior College	Avon, Indiana
10	INF	C. J. Valdez	R/R	6 ft 0 in (1.83 m)	185 lb (84 kg)	Sr	Yavapai College	Gilbert, Arizona
11	LHP	Cal Lambert	L/L	6 ft 2 in (1.88 m)	210 lb (95 kg)	Jr	Yavapai College	Peoria, Arizona
13	OF	Jake Jarvis	L/R	6 ft 2 in (1.88 m)	205 lb (93 kg)	Sr	Central Arizona College	Gilbert, Arizona
14	RHP	Khal Stephen	R/R	6 ft 4 in (1.93 m)	215 lb (98 kg)	So	Seeger H. S.	Williamsport, Indiana
16	RHP	Kade Ruffner	R/R	6 ft 5 in (1.96 m)	180 lb (82 kg)	Fr	Bryant H. S.	Benton, Arkansas
17	INF	Lukas Cook	R/R	6 ft 3 in (1.91 m)	200 lb (91 kg)	Jr	Dyersburg State	Knoxville, Tennessee
18	LHP	Jonathan Blackwell	L/L	6 ft 1 in (1.85 m)	215 lb (98 kg)	Jr	Hurricane H. S.	Charleston, West Virginia
19	RHP	Jackson Dannalley	R/R	5 ft 10 in (1.78 m)	195 lb (88 kg)	Jr	Colmesneil H. S.	Colmesneil, Texas
20	OF	Couper Cornblum	R/R	6 ft 0 in (1.83 m)	190 lb (86 kg)	Jr	Midway H. S.	Woodway, Texas
22	C	Steve Ramirez	R/R	5 ft 11 in (1.8 m)	195 lb (88 kg)	RS Sr	Riverside City College	San Bernardino, California
23	INF	Paul Toetz	R/R	5 ft 11 in (1.8 m)	190 lb (86 kg)	RS Jr	Greendale H. S.	Greendale, Wisconsin
25	C	Jake Stadler	L/R	6 ft 0 in (1.83 m)	190 lb (86 kg)	RS So	Mount Vernon H. S.	Greenfield, Indiana
26	RHP	Logan Danzeisen	L/R	6 ft 2 in (1.88 m)	205 lb (93 kg)	RS So	Sylvania Southview H. S.	Sylvania, Ohio
27	RHP	Aaron Suval	R/R	5 ft 11 in (1.8 m)	185 lb (84 kg)	Jr	Glendale Community College	Agoura Hills, California
29	RHP	Kyle Iwinski	R/R	6 ft 2 in (1.88 m)	220 lb (100 kg)	Jr	Kankakee Community College	Griffith, Indiana
31	LHP	Zach Fletcher	L/L	6 ft 2 in (1.88 m)	200 lb (91 kg)	Fr	Bedford H. S.	Bedford, New Hampshire
32	RHP	C. J. Backer	R/R	6 ft 7 in (2.01 m)	165 lb (75 kg)	Jr	Danville Area Community College	Newburgh, Indiana
33	RHP	Parker Dean	R/R	6 ft 4 in (1.93 m)	230 lb (104 kg)	Fr	Western H. S.	Russiaville, Indiana
34	INF	Corbin Malott	R/R	6 ft 1 in (1.85 m)	180 lb (82 kg)	Fr	New Castle H. S.	New Castle, Indiana
35	C	Connor Caskenette	R/R	6 ft 0 in (1.83 m)	215 lb (98 kg)	Jr	Cochise College	Duncan, British Columbia
36	RHP	Carter Doorn	R/R	6 ft 3 in (1.91 m)	175 lb (79 kg)	So	Lake Central H. S.	Schererville, Indiana
37	INF	Keenan Taylor	R/R	5 ft 10 in (1.78 m)	205 lb (93 kg)	Jr	Parkland College	Westfield, Indiana
40	LHP	Calvin Schapira	R/L	6 ft 5 in (1.96 m)	30 lb (14 kg)	RS Sr	Central Arizona College	Scottsdale, Arizona
41	OF	Brody Chrisman	L/R	6 ft 3 in (1.91 m)	205 lb (93 kg)	Fr	Zionsville Community H. S.	Zionsville, Indiana
43	RHP	Avery Cook	R/R	6 ft 6 in (1.98 m)	235 lb (107 kg)	RS Jr	Whitesboro H. S.	Utica, New York
44	INF	Jake Parr	R/R	6 ft 7 in (2.01 m)	210 lb (95 kg)	Sr	Buckhorn H. S.	New Market, Alabama
45	RHP	Carter Krawchuk	R/R	6 ft 1 in (1.85 m)	180 lb (82 kg)	Fr	St. Francis Catholic Secondary School	St. Catharines, Ontario
46	LHP	Malcolm Gilchrist	L/L	6 ft 5 in (1.96 m)	200 lb (91 kg)	Jr	Bergen Community College	Little Ferry, New Jersey
48	RHP	Griffin Lohman	L/R	6 ft 6 in (1.98 m)	230 lb (104 kg)	Jr	Hamilton Southeastern H. S.	Fishers, Indiana
49	C	Luke Gaffney	R/R	6 ft 2 in (1.88 m)	215 lb (98 kg)	Fr	Boyle County H. S.	Danville, Kentucky

Head coach

39 Greg Goff

Assistant coach(es)

Hitting coach(es)

Terry Rooney

Pitching coach(es)

21 Chris Marx

Legend

- (C) Team captain
- (S) Suspended
- (I) Ineligible
- Injured
- Current redshirt

Roster
Last update: December 16, 2021

== Schedule ==
2023 Purdue Boilermakers baseball game log
Regular season
February (5–3)

#	Date	Rank	Opponent	Site/stadium	Score	Win	Loss	Save	Attendance	Overall record	B1G record
1	February 17		vs Holy Cross	Constellation Field • Sugar Land, Texas	12–1	Stephen (1–0)	Chudy (0–1)	None	188	1–0	–
2	February 18		vs Holy Cross	Constellation Field • Sugar Land, Texas	14–4	Suval (1–0)	DiLauro (0–1)	None	275	2–0	–
3	February 18		vs Holy Cross	Constellation Fieldx • Sugar Land, Texas	3–12	Fox (1–0)	Backer (0–1)	Macchiarola (1)	275	2–1	–
4	February 19		vs Holy Cross	Constellation Field • Sugar Land, Texas	12–2	Blackwell (1–0)	Wywoda (0–1)	None	236	3–1	–
5	February 24		vs NJIT	Ting Stadium • Holly Springs, North Carolina	6–5	Suval (2–0)	Reiner (0–1)	None	755	4–1	–
6	February 24		vs NJIT	Ting Stadium • Holly Springs, North Carolina	1–5	Kidd (2–0)	Backer (0–2)	de Jong (1)	755	4–2	–
7	February 25		vs NJIT	Ting Stadium • Holly Springs, North Carolina	7–4	Dannelley (1–0)	Cirone (0–1)	Suval (1)	133	5–2	–
8	February 29		vs NJIT	Ting Stadium • Holly Springs, North Carolina	5–7	Georgini (2–2)	Schapira (0–1)	None	478	5–3	–

March (6–10)

#	Date	Rank	Opponent	Site/stadium	Score	Win	Loss	Save	Attendance	Overall record	B1G record
9	March 3		vs Akron	Ting Stadium • Holly Springs, North Carolina	1–2	Tortorella (1–1)	Lambert (0–1)	Gillies (1)	266	5–4	–
10	March 4		vs Akron	Ting Stadium • Holly Springs, North Carolina	17–9	Blackwell (2–0)	Atkins (0–2)	None	554	6–4	–
11	March 4		vs Akron	Ting Stadium • Holly Springs, North Carolina	13–0	Iwinski (1–0)	Pirkle (0–1)	None	554	7–4	–
12	March 5		vs Akron	Ting Stadium • Holly Springs, North Carolina	23–4	Schapira (1–1)	Roth (0–2)	None	335	8–4	–
13	March 10		at #4 Ole Miss	Swayze Field • Oxford, Mississippi	7–15	Dougherty (2–1)	Stephen (1–1)	None	10,337	8–5	–
14	March 11		at #4 Ole Miss	Swayze Field • Oxford, Mississippi	6–7	Nichols (1–0)	Dannelley (1–1)	None	9,991	8–6	–
15	March 12		at #4 Ole Miss	Swayze Field • Oxford, Mississippi	1–6	Rivas (4–0)	Iwinski (1–1)	None	9,377	8–7	–
16	March 15		Northern Illinois	Alexander Field • West Lafayette, Indiana	14–5	Stephen (2–1)	Lutes (0–1)	None	885	9–7	–
17	March 17		at Evansville	Charles H. Braun Stadium • Evansville, Indiana	2–5	Smith (2–3)	Suval (2–1)	Hardman (1)	376	9–8	–
–	March 18		at Evansville	Charles H. Braun Stadium • Evansville, Indiana	Game cancelled						
18	March 19		at Evansville	Charles H. Braun Stadium • Evansville, Indiana	4–6	Schultz (3–1)	Blackwell (2–1)	None	578	9–9	–
19	March 21		UIC	Alexander Field • West Lafayette, Indiana	4–6	Zahora (1–0)	Dannalley (1–2)	Newton (1)	1,036	9–10	–
20	March 24		at Michigan State	Drayton McLane Baseball Stadium at John H. Kobs Field • East Lansing, Michigan	5–4	Suval (3–1)	Carson (2–2)	None	703	10–10	1–0
21	March 26		at Michigan State	Drayton McLane Baseball Stadium at John H. Kobs Field • East Lansing, Michigan	4–5	Szczepaniak (1–1)	Dannelley (1–3)	Rush (4)	1,024	10–11	1–1
22	March 26		at Michigan State	Drayton McLane Baseball Stadium at John H. Kobs Field • East Lansing, Michigan	6–12	Cook (2–1)	Iwinski (1–2)	None	1,024	10–12	1–2
23	March 28		at Indiana State	Bob Warn Field at Sycamore Stadium • Terre Haute, Indiana	2–8	Miller (1–0)	Schapira (1–2)	None	1,235	10–13	1–2
24	March 31		Northwestern	Alexander Field • West Lafayette, Indiana	8–4	Stephen (3–1)	McClure (1–4)	None	1,106	11–13	2–2

April (10–9)

#	Date	Rank	Opponent	Site/stadium	Score	Win	Loss	Save	Attendance	Overall record	B1G record
25	April 2		Northwestern	Alexander Field • West Lafayette, Indiana	3–7	Farinelli (1–4)	Blackwell (2–2)	Grable (1)	2,858	11–14	2–3
26	April 2		Northwestern	Alexander Field • West Lafayette, Indiana	4–3	Lambert (1–1)	Benneche (0–3)	None	2,858	12–14	3–3
27	April 4		Evansville	Alexander Field • West Lafayette, Indiana	10–12	Blunt (3–0)	Lambert (1–2)	Hardman (3)	1,158	12–15	3–3
28	April 7		at Minnesota	Siebert Field • Minneapolis, Minnesota	3–0	Stephen (4–1)	Novotny (0–4)	Suval (2)	326	13–15	4–3
29	April 8		at Minnesota	Siebert Field • Minneapolis, Minnesota	15–3	Blackwell (3–2)	Shepard (1–2)	None	731	14–15	5–3
30	April 9		at Minnesota	Siebert Field • Minneapolis, Minnesota	3–9	Holetz (2–2)	Iwinski (2–2)	None	374	14–16	5–4
31	April 11		Indiana State	Alexander Field • West Lafayette, Indiana	1–4	Pruitt (1–1)	Backer (0–3)	Cutts (1)	1,381	14–17	5–4
32	April 14		Penn State	Alexander Field • West Lafayette, Indiana	3–15	Henline (4–1)	Stephen (4–2)	None	1,532	14–18	5–5
33	April 15		Penn State	Alexander Field • West Lafayette, Indiana	9–8	Blackwell (4–2)	Miller (2–3)	Suval (3)	3,023	15–18	6–5
34	April 15		Penn State	Alexander Field • West Lafayette, Indiana	4–3	Iwinski (2–3)	Luensmann (5–2)	Suval (4)	3,023	16–18	7–5
35	April 18		Ball State	Alexander Field • West Lafayette, Indiana	3–2	Backer (1–3)	Knapp (1–2)	Dannelley (1)	1,440	17–18	7–5
36	April 19		Butler	Alexander Field • West Lafayette, Indiana	16–9	Doorn (1–0)	Zmolik (0–2)	None	1,199	18–18	7–5
37	April 21		at Maryland	Bob "Turtle" Smith Stadium • College Park, Maryland	10–8	Stephen (5–2)	Savacool (4–4)	Dannelley (2)	1,092	19–18	8–5
38	April 22		at Maryland	Bob "Turtle" Smith Stadium • College Park, Maryland	5–6	McCoy (3–5)	Blackwell (4–3)	Belgrave (2)	1,040	19–19	8–6
39	April 23		at Maryland	Bob "Turtle" Smith Stadium • College Park, Maryland	8–10	Lippman (4–0)	Iwinski (2–4)	Falco (6)	1,482	19–20	8–7
–	April 25		Valparaiso	Alexander Field • West Lafayette, Indiana	Game postponed						
40	April 26		Miami (OH)	Alexander Field • West Lafayette, Indiana	4–8	Sosna (2–1)	Doorn (1–1)	None	1,217	19–21	8–7
41	April 28		Rutgers	Alexander Field • West Lafayette, Indiana	6–1	Stephen (6–2)	Coppola (3–4)	Dannelley (3)	1,328	20–21	9–7
42	April 29		Rutgers	Alexander Field • West Lafayette, Indiana	6–3	Blackwell (5–3)	Besser (2–4)	Suval (5)	1,718	21–21	10–7
43	April 30		Rutgers	Alexander Field • West Lafayette, Indiana	5–9	Marshall (4–1)	Dannelley (1–4)	None	1,700	21–22	10–8

May (3–7)

#	Date	Rank	Opponent	Site/stadium	Score	Win	Loss	Save	Attendance	Overall record	B1G record
44	May 5		South Dakota State	Alexander Field • West Lafayette, Indiana	10–7	Stephen (7–2)	Kruger (0–3)	None	1,641	22–22	10–8
45	May 6		South Dakota State	Alexander Field • West Lafayette, Indiana	5–7	Kunz (1–4)	Blackwell (5–4)	Bourassa (6)	1,717	22–23	10–8
46	May 7		South Dakota State	Alexander Field • West Lafayette, Indiana	3–2	Dannelley (2–4)	Sundquist (1–1)	None	1,862	23–23	10–8
–	May 8		South Dakota State	Alexander Field • West Lafayette, Indiana	Game cancelled						
47	May 10		at UIC	Les Miller Field at Curtis Granderson Stadium • Chicago, Illinois	3–7	Karst (1–2)	Doorn (1–2)	Lawler (4)	471	23–24	10–8
48	May 12		at Indiana	Bart Kaufman Field • Bloomington, Indiana	11–26	Sinnard (6–2)	Stephen (7–3)	None	2,293	23–25	10–9
49	May 13		at Indiana	Bart Kaufman Field • Bloomington, Indiana	3–15	Kraft (6–1)	Blackwell (5–5)	None	2,434	23–26	10–10
50	May 14		at Indiana	Bart Kaufman Field • Bloomington, Indiana	2–10	Bothwell (4–1)	Iwinski (2–5)	None	1,895	23–27	10–11
51	May 18		Nebraska	Alexander Field • West Lafayette, Indiana	5–10	Hawkins (4–0)	Stephen (7–4)	None	1,744	23–28	10–12
52	May 19		Nebraska	Alexander Field • West Lafayette, Indiana	7–3	Iwinski (3–5)	Walsh (3–3)	None	1,120	24–28	11–12
53	May 20		Nebraska	Alexander Field • West Lafayette, Indiana	4–6	Bunz (1–0)	Blackwell (5–6)	Perry (3)	1,875	24–29	11–13

== Awards ==
=== Big Ten Conference Players of the Week ===
Weekly Awards
Player	Award	Date Awarded	Ref.
Paul Toetz	Player of the Week	March 7, 2023	
Kyle Iwinsk	Pitcher of the Week	March 7, 2023	

=== Conference awards ===
Awards
Player	Award	Date Awarded	Ref.
Jake Parr	Third Team All-Big Ten	May 22, 2023	
Paul Toetz	Third Team All-Big Ten	May 22, 2023	
Khal Stephen	Third Team All-Big Ten	May 22, 2023	
