= Mark Van Ameyde =

American baseball coach

Current position
- Title: Pitching coach
- Team: Michigan State
- Conference: Big Ten

Biographical details
- Education: University of Detroit Mercy

Playing career
- 1991–1992: Henry Ford CC
- 1993–1994: Detroit Mercy

Coaching career (HC unless noted)
- 1999–2000: Saint Mary's
- 2001–2004: Detroit (asst.)
- 2005–2007: Georgetown (asst.)
- 2008: Eastern Michigan (asst.)
- 2009–2014: Michigan State (asst.)
- 2015–2017: Eastern Michigan
- 2018–present: Michigan State (asst.)

Head coaching record
- Overall: 70–106
- Tournaments: MAC: 3–2

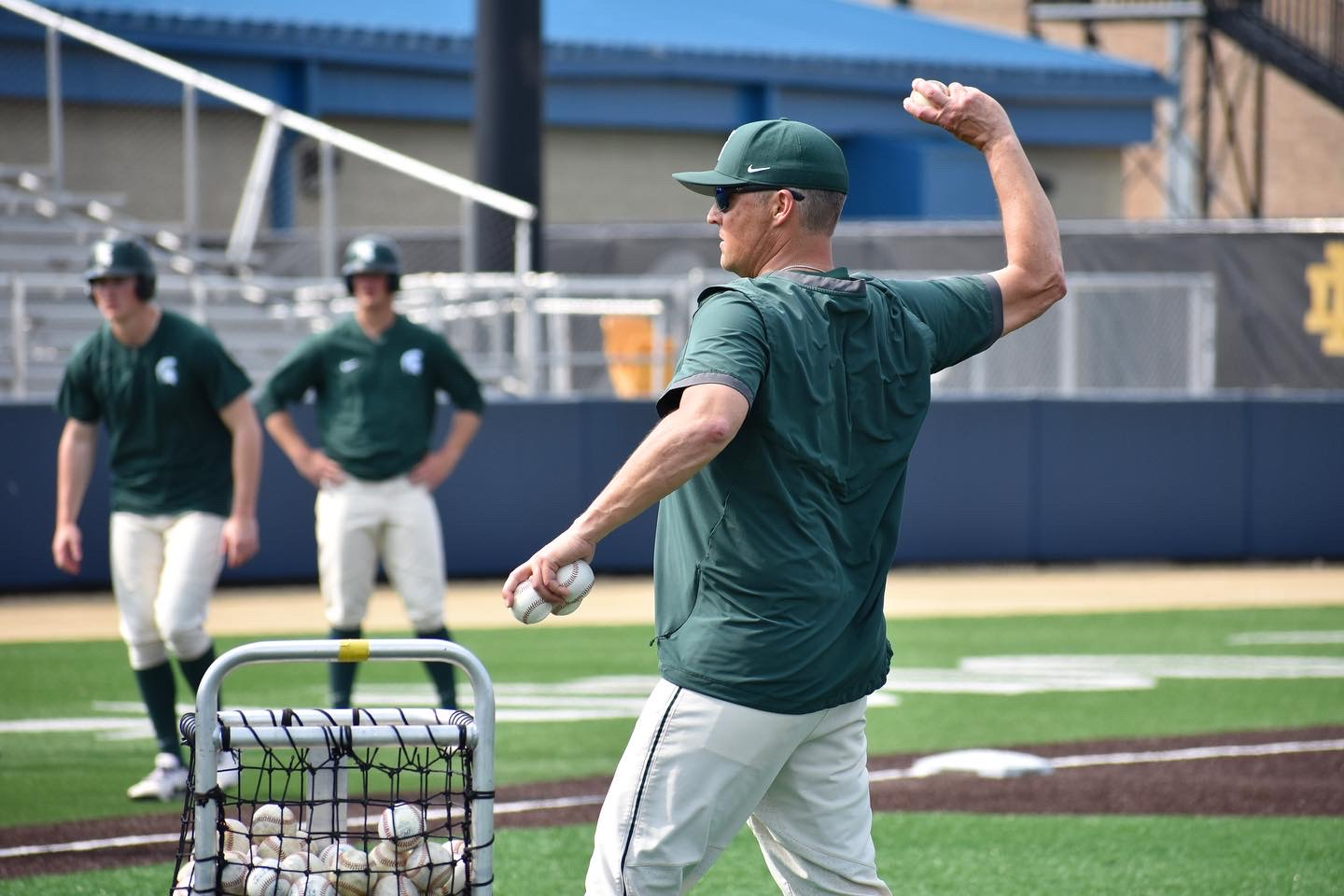

Mark Van Ameyde is a college baseball coach who is currently the pitching coach for the Michigan State Spartans baseball team. He previously served as the head baseball coach of the Eastern Michigan Eagles baseball program. He was named to that position prior to the 2015 season.

== Early years ==
Van Amyede was raised in Novi, Michigan, and attended Novi High School.

== Playing career ==
Van Ameyde began his collegiate playing career at Henry Ford Community College in 1991. In his first season, he helped lead the team to a regional championship. He also played at Henry Ford in 1992 before moving on to the NCAA Division I ranks with the Detroit Titans. Van Ameyde spent two seasons at Detroit, earning all-conference and team MVP honors in his final season.

He graduated from Detroit in 1996 with a degree in communications.

== Coaching career ==
Van Ameyde began his coaching career as the head coach at Saint Mary's College. He helped start up the baseball program at Saint Mary's. Following two seasons at Saint Mary's, he moved on to help his coach his alma mater of Detroit. Over four seasons with the Titans, he spent time as both hitting coach and pitching coach, as well as recruiting coordinator. He left after the 2004 season, when the program was discontinued due to budget cuts.

Following his tenure with Detroit, Van Ameyde spent three seasons as an assistant at Georgetown, serving as pitching coach and recruiting coordinator. In 2008, he served as an assistant at Eastern Michigan, where he helped lead the team to the NCAA tournament. He also coached Matt Shoemaker, who current plays for the Los Angeles Angels of Anaheim.

After the 2008 season, Van Ameyde joined Eastern Michigan head coach Jake Boss on his staff at Michigan State. Over his six seasons with the Spartans, they made appearance in an NCAA Regional (2012), won a conference title (2011), and made three appearances in the Big Ten Conference tournament. In 2014, the Michigan State pitching staff achieved a 3.09 ERA, ranking second in the Big Ten and marking the 10th lowest single-season ERA in MSU history.

On July 15, 2014, Van Ameyde returned to Eastern Michigan as head coach, his first head coaching position at the Division I level. At EMU, Van Ameyde coached five All-MAC honorees, including two in 2017 after two in 2016, marking the first time that EMU had multiple players selected for all-conference honors since 2011–12.

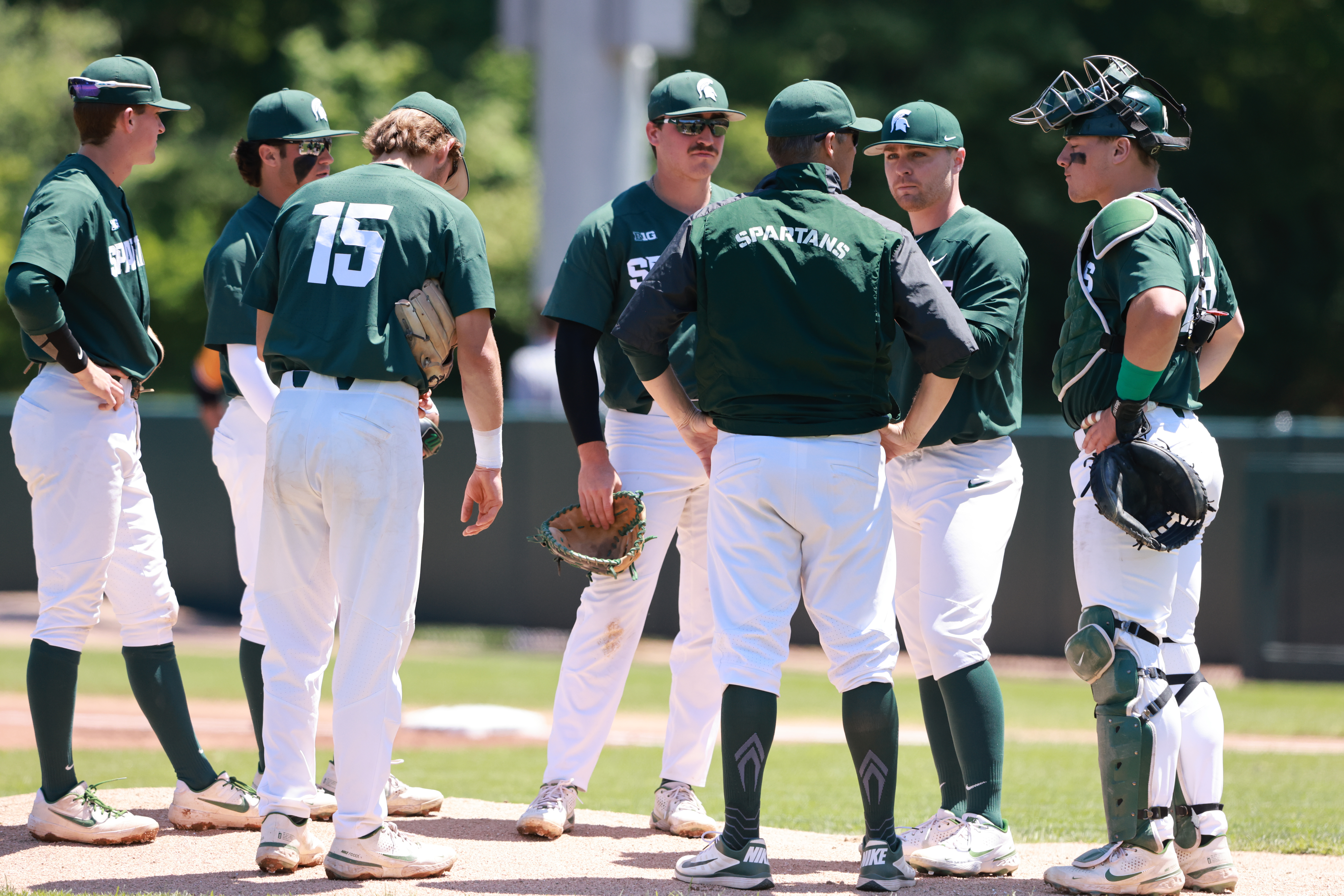
Coach Van Ameyde – 2021 Michigan State Baseball Season

On December 14, 2017, Michigan State baseball head coach Jake Boss Jr. announced the return of former Spartan assistant coach Mark Van Ameyde as the MSU pitching coach. Under Van Ameyde's guidance, Spartan pitchers have excelled, with four being selected in the last five Major League Drafts (Riley McCauley in 2018, Mitchell Tyranski and Indigo Diaz in 2019, and Mason Erla in 2021), and three others signing non-drafted free agent contracts (Mike Mokma in 2019, Sam Benschoter in 2021, and Kyle Bischoff in 2023). Coach Van Ameyde completed his sixth season back on the Spartan bench and 12th overall in 2023.

== Head coaching record ==
The following is a table of Van Ameyde's yearly records as an NCAA head baseball coach.

Record table
Season	Team	Overall	Conference	Standing	Postseason
Eastern Michigan Eagles (Mid-American Conference) (2015–2017)
2015	Eastern Michigan	20–35	9–18	6th West	
2016	Eastern Michigan	23–36	10–14	6th West	
2017	Eastern Michigan	27–35	14–10	2nd West	Mid-American tournament
Eastern Michigan:		70–106	33–42		
Total:		70–106			
National champion Postseason invitational champion Conference regular season champion Conference regular season and conference tournament champion Division regular season champion Division regular season and conference tournament champion Conference tournament champion
