= Rob Vaughn =

American baseball player and coach (born 1987)

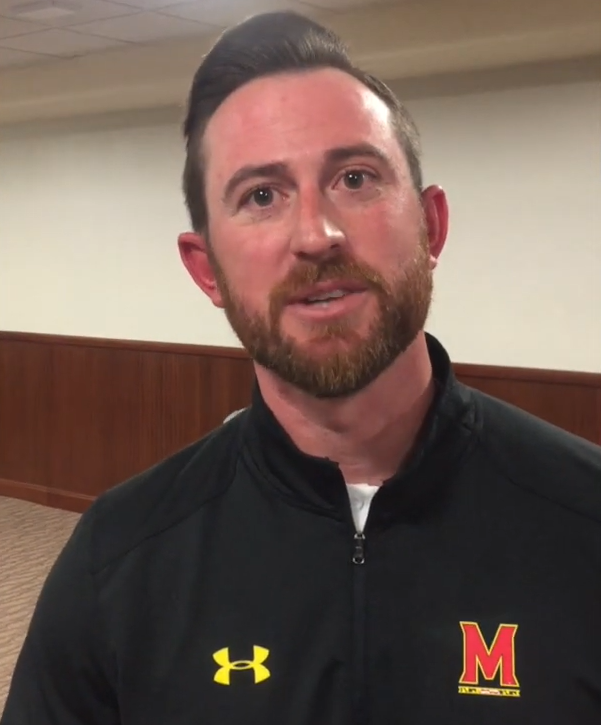
- Vaughn with Maryland in 2019

Current position
- Title: Head coach
- Team: Alabama
- Conference: SEC
- Record: 116–63 (.648)

Biographical details
- Born: July 7, 1987 (age 39); Corpus Christi, Texas, U.S.

Playing career
- 2006–2009: Kansas State
- 2009: Bristol White Sox
- 2009: Kannapolis Intimidators
- 2010: Great Falls Voyagers
- Position: Catcher

Coaching career (HC unless noted)
- 2011–2012: Kansas State (assistant)
- 2013–2017: Maryland (assistant)
- 2018–2023: Maryland
- 2024–present: Alabama

Head coaching record
- Overall: 299–178 (.627)
- Tournaments: NCAA: 11–12 (.478)

Accomplishments and honors

Championships
- 2× Big Ten regular season (2022, 2023); Big Ten tournament (2023)

Awards
- 2× Big Ten Coach of the Year (2022, 2023)

Robert Earl Vaughn (born July 7, 1987) is an American baseball coach and former catcher. He is the current head baseball coach at Alabama. He previously served as head coach at Maryland from 2018 to 2023. He played college baseball at Kansas State University from 2006 to 2009 for coach Brad Hill before pursuing a professional career from 2009 to 2010.

== Coaching career ==
On June 22, 2017, Vaughn was named head coach for Maryland. In July 2021, he signed a five-year contract extension with Maryland. During the 2022 NCAA Division I baseball season, Vaughn led Maryland to a 44–10 record, the program's best regular season in program history. He was subsequently named the Big Ten Coach of the Year. During the 2023 NCAA Division I baseball season, he led Maryland to a 42–19 record, the regular season and Big Ten tournament championship, their first tournament championship in program history. He was subsequently named the Big Ten Coach of the Year for the second consecutive year.

On June 12, 2023, he was named head coach for Alabama.

== Head coaching record ==
Record table
Season	Team	Overall	Conference	Standing	Postseason
Maryland Terrapins (Big Ten Conference) (2018–2023)
2018	Maryland	24–30	9–14	9th	
2019	Maryland	29–29	12–12	T-6th	
2020	Maryland	10–5	0–0		Season canceled due to COVID-19
2021	Maryland	30–18	28–16	2nd	NCAA Regional
2022	Maryland	48–14	18–5	1st	NCAA Regional
2023	Maryland	42–19	17–7	1st	NCAA Regional
Maryland:		183–115 (.614)	84–54 (.609)		
Alabama Crimson Tide (Southeastern Conference) (2024–present)
2024	Alabama	33–24	13–17	T–4th (West)	NCAA Regional
2025	Alabama	41–18	16–14	T–7th	NCAA Regional
2026	Alabama	42–21	18–12	T–4th	College World Series
Alabama:		116–63 (.648)	47–43 (.522)		
Total:		299–178 (.627)			
National champion Postseason invitational champion Conference regular season champion Conference regular season and conference tournament champion Division regular season champion Division regular season and conference tournament champion Conference tournament champion

== See also ==
- List of current NCAA Division I baseball coaches
