= 2023 Big Ten baseball tournament =

American college baseball tournament

- Teams: 8
- Format: Double-elimination
- Finals site: Charles Schwab Field Omaha; Omaha, Nebraska
- Champions: Maryland (1st title)
- Runner-up: Iowa (5th title game)
- Winning coach: Rob Vaughn (1st title)
- Television: BTN

2023 Big Ten Conference baseball standings
	Conf.						Overall
Team	W		L		T	PCT	W		L		T	PCT
Maryland ‍†‍‡‍^{y}	17	–	7	–	0	.708	42	–	19	–	0	.689
Indiana ‍‍‍^{y}	16	–	8	–	0	.667	41	–	18	–	0	.695
Iowa ‍‍‍^{y}	15	–	8	–	0	.652	43	–	14	–	0	.754
Nebraska ‍‍‍	15	–	9	–	0	.625	33	–	23	–	1	.588
Rutgers ‍‍‍	14	–	10	–	0	.583	33	–	23	–	0	.589
Michigan ‍‍‍	13	–	11	–	0	.542	28	–	28	–	0	.500
Michigan State ‍‍‍	12	–	12	–	0	.500	33	–	22	–	0	.600
Illinois ‍‍‍	12	–	12	–	0	.500	25	–	27	–	0	.481
Purdue ‍‍‍	11	–	13	–	0	.458	24	–	29	–	0	.453
Minnesota ‍‍‍	10	–	14	–	0	.417	18	–	34	–	0	.346
Ohio State ‍‍‍	9	–	15	–	0	.375	31	–	25	–	0	.554
Penn State ‍‍‍	7	–	16	–	0	.304	25	–	25	–	0	.500
Northwestern ‍‍‍	4	–	20	–	0	.167	10	–	40	–	0	.200
† – Conference champion ‡ – Tournament champion y – Invited to the NCAA tournament As of June 2, 2023; Rankings from D1Baseball

The 2023 Big Ten baseball tournament was held at Charles Schwab Field Omaha in Omaha, Nebraska, from May 23 through 28. As the tournament winner, Maryland earned the Big Ten Conference's automatic bid to the 2023 NCAA Division I baseball tournament. The tournament aired on the Big Ten Network.

== Format and seeding ==
The 2023 tournament was an eight team double-elimination tournament. The top eight teams, based on conference regular season winning percentage, earned invites to the tournament. The tournament used a 3-2-3-2-4-1 format in terms of games played per day with competition beginning one day earlier than in past years to allow for flexibility in case of inclement weather.

== Bracket ==
First round
1	Maryland	3
8	Michigan State	2
4	Nebraska	9
5	Rutgers	7
5	Rutgers	4
8	Michigan State	6
2	Indiana	4
7	Illinois	3
3	Iowa	13^{8}
6	Michigan	3
6	Michigan	6
7	Illinois	3

Second round
1	Maryland	2^{10}
4	Nebraska	1
4	Nebraska	4
8	Michigan State	0
2	Indiana	4
3	Iowa	9
2	Indiana	6
6	Michigan	13

Semifinals
1	Maryland	4	—
4	Nebraska	2	—
3	Iowa	5	—
6	Michigan	0	—

Finals
1	Maryland	4
3	Iowa	0

== Schedule ==
Game	Time*	Matchup^{#}	Score	Television
Tuesday, May 23
1	11:00 a.m.	No. 3 Iowa vs. No. 6 Michigan	13–3^{8}	BTN
2	3:22 p.m.	No. 2 Indiana vs. No. 7 Illinois	4–3	BTN
3	7:00 p.m.	No. 1 Maryland vs. No. 8 Michigan State	3–2	BTN
Wednesday, May 24
4	3:00 p.m.	No. 4 Nebraska vs. No. 5 Rutgers	9–7	BTN
5	8:00 p.m.	No. 6 Michigan vs. No. 7 Illinois	6–3	BTN
Thursday, May 25
6	11:00 a.m.	No. 5 Rutgers vs. No. 8 Michigan State	4–6	BTN
7	3:25 p.m.	No. 2 Indiana vs. No. 3 Iowa	4–9	BTN
8	7:40 p.m.	No. 1 Maryland vs. No. 4 Nebraska	2–1^{10}	BTN
Friday, May 26
9	3:00 p.m.	No. 2 Indiana vs. No. 6 Michigan	6–13	BTN
10	8:00 p.m.	No. 4 Nebraska vs. No. 8 Michigan State	4–0	BTN
Semifinals - Saturday, May 27
11	10:00 a.m.	No. 3 Iowa vs. No. 6 Michigan	5–0	BTN
12	2:00 p.m.	No. 1 Maryland vs. No. 4 Nebraska	4–2	BTN
Championship – Sunday, May 28
13	3:00 p.m.	No. 1 Maryland vs. No. 3 Iowa	4–0	BTN
*Game times in CDT. # – Rankings denote tournament seed.
