= Mitch Voit =

American baseball player (born 2004)

New York Mets
- Infielder
- Born: September 30, 2004 (age 21); Milwaukee, Wisconsin, U.S.
- Bats: Right Throws: Right

Mitchell Veblen Voit (born September 30, 2004) is an American professional baseball infielder in the New York Mets organization. He played college baseball at the University of Michigan.

== Amateur career ==
Voit attended Whitefish Bay High School in Whitefish Bay, Wisconsin. During his senior year he posted an 11–0 record with 86 strikeouts and an 0.52 earned run average (ERA) in 53 2/3 innings. Offensively he hit .566, with five home runs and 35 runs batted in (RBI). He was subsequently named the Wisconsin Gatorade Baseball Player of the Year and Wisconsin Baseball Coaches Association Player of the Year in 2022.

He committed to play college baseball for Michigan. During the 2023 season, in his freshman year, he appeared in 54 games with 51 starts at third base and hit .267 with seven home runs and 32 RBI. He posted a 4–1 record with 25 strikeouts and five saves, and led the team with a 3.25 ERA in 36 innings pitched. His seven home runs were the fifth most by a Michigan freshman since 1960. Following the season he was named to the All-Big Ten Freshman Team as both a third baseman and pitcher. He was also named a D1Baseball second team Freshman All-American as a utility player. In 2023, he played collegiate summer baseball with the Yarmouth–Dennis Red Sox of the Cape Cod Baseball League.

During the 2024 season, in his sophomore year, he appeared in 59 games with 56 starts and hit .292 with 20 doubles, two triples, 14 home runs and 46 RBI. He led the team with 69 hits and 135 total bases. He posted a 5–3 record with 41 strikeouts and a 5.49 ERA in 62 1/3 innings. Following the season he was named to the All-Big Ten First Team as a utility player. In July 2024, he underwent internal brace surgery on his right elbow, ending his pitching career.

During the 2025 season, in his junior year, he started all 56 games at second base, the only Wolverine to do so. He hit .346, with 17 doubles, four triples, 14 home runs, and 60 RBI. He led the team in on-base percentage (.471), slugging percentage (.668), and walks (40). Defensively he had a .986 fielding percentage with 116 putouts, 176 assists, 38 double plays and four errors. On March 16, 2025, in a game against USC, after hitting a triple, Voit celebrated by mimicking snorting a line of cocaine with the third-base line. He apologized the next day. Following the season he was named to the All-Big Ten First Team and All-Defensive Team. He was also named to the D1Baseball All-America third team.

== Professional career ==
Voit was selected 38th overall by the New York Mets in the 2025 Major League Baseball draft. He became Michigan's highest MLB draft pick since David Parrish in 2000. On July 17, 2025, Voit officially signed with the Mets, receiving a $1,750,000 signing bonus.

Voit made his professional debut after signing with the Single-A St. Lucie Mets and hit .235 with one home run and 20 stolen bases over 22 games. He was assigned to the High-A Brooklyn Cyclones to begin the 2026 season. On July 27, 2026, he was promoted to the AA Binghamton Rumble Ponies.

== Personal life ==
Voit was born to Todd and Sharon Voit and has two brothers, Nathan and Joe, and one sister, Gabriella.
