= Tyler Graham =

American baseball player & coach (born 1984)

Michigan Wolverines
- Outfielder / Coach
- Born: January 25, 1984 (age 42); Great Falls, Montana, U.S.
- Batted: Right Threw: Right

MLB debut
- September 7, 2012, for the Arizona Diamondbacks

Last MLB appearance
- October 2, 2012, for the Arizona Diamondbacks

MLB statistics
- Batting average: .000
- Home runs: 0
- Runs batted in: 0
- Stats at Baseball Reference

Teams
- Arizona Diamondbacks (2012)

Tyler Lewis Graham (born January 25, 1984) is an American former professional baseball outfielder and current assistant head coach for the Michigan Wolverines. He played in Major League Baseball (MLB) for the Arizona Diamondbacks.

== Amateur career ==
Graham went to Charles M. Russell High School in Great Falls, Montana. He attended Oregon State University, where he played college baseball for the Oregon State Beavers baseball team, competing in the Pacific-10 Conference. Graham was drafted by the Chicago Cubs in the 14th round (430th overall) of the 2005 Major League Baseball draft following his junior season at Oregon State, but he opted not to sign, returning to Oregon State for his senior season.

In 2006, Oregon State won the College World Series, and Graham made the final out in center field on a fly ball to close out the deciding game three.

== Professional career ==
=== San Francisco Giants ===
The San Francisco Giants drafted Graham in the 19th round (566th overall) of the 2006 Major League Baseball draft following his senior season, and he signed.

With the Fresno Grizzlies of the Triple-A Pacific Coast League, Graham set a team record with 60 stolen bases in 2011. The Giants added him to the 40-man roster to protect him from the Rule 5 draft after the 2011 season.

Graham was designated for assignment by the Giants on May 1, 2012.

=== Arizona Diamondbacks ===
On May 14, 2012, Graham signed a minor league contract with the Arizona Diamondbacks organization. He made his major league debut with the Diamondbacks on September 7. Graham made 10 appearances for Arizona during his rookie campaign, going 0-for-2. On October 25, Graham was removed from the 40-man roster and sent outright to the Triple-A Reno Aces. On November 3, Graham was released by the Diamondbacks. He had shoulder surgery at the end of the month, but came back in time to start the ensuing season.

=== York Revolution ===
In 2013, Graham signed with the York Revolution of the Atlantic League of Professional Baseball.

=== Later career ===
In 2013, Graham played for York, the Fargo-Moorhead RedHawks and the Winnipeg Goldeyes of the American Association, and the Rojos del Águila de Veracruz of the Mexican League. Graham spent the final season of his playing career in the San Francisco Giants organization.

== Coaching career ==
Graham spent the 2015 and 2016 seasons as an undergrad assistant for the Oregon State Beaver baseball team. He spent 2017 through 2019 as the director of player development for Oregon State. Graham also coached in the Western Canadian Baseball League for the Okotoks Dawgs and in the Golden State Collegiate Baseball League for the Medford Rogues.

Graham was hired by the Texas Rangers organization to serve as a coach for the Nashville Sounds in 2020.

On July 26, 2023, Graham was named assistant head coach for Michigan.
