= Brock Huntzinger =

American baseball player and coach

Current position
- Title: Pitching coach
- Team: Michigan
- Conference: Big Ten

Biographical details
- Born: July 2, 1988 (age 38); Anderson, Indiana

Playing career
- 2007: Gulf Coast Red Sox
- 2008: Lowell Spinners
- 2008–2009: Greenville Drive
- 2010: Salem Red Sox
- 2011–2013: Portland Sea Dogs
- 2012–2013: Pawtucket Red Sox
- 2014: Norfolk Tides
- 2015: Nashville Sounds
- 2016: Charlotte Knights
- 2016: Birmingham Barons
- Position: Pitcher

Coaching career (HC unless noted)
- 2018–2020: Boise State (PC)
- 2023–present: Michigan (PC)

Brock Alan Huntzinger (born July 2, 1988) is an American baseball coach and former professional baseball pitcher. He is the pitching coach for Michigan. He played professional baseball from 2007 to 2016.

== Career ==
Huntzinger attended Pendleton Heights High School in Pendleton, Indiana. In his high school career, Huntzinger pitched to a 26–6 win–loss record and recorded 257 strikeouts in 201 innings pitched. He committed to attend Indiana University on a baseball scholarship after high school. The Boston Red Sox selected Huntzinger in the third round, with the 114th overall selection, of the 2007 Major League Baseball draft. Huntzinger signed with Boston, receiving a $225,000 signing bonus, thereby forgoing college.

Huntzinger pitched for the Greenville Drive of the Class A South Atlantic League in 2008 and 2009. After pitching for the Portland Sea Dogs of the Class AA Eastern League in 2011, the Red Sox assigned Huntzinger to the Arizona Fall League after the season. In 2012, after beginning the season with an 0–4 record and a 9.19 earned run average (ERA) with Portland, the team transitioned Huntzinger from a starting pitcher to a relief pitcher. He won the Red Sox' minor league pitcher of the month award for June, in which he had a 1.80 ERA, and continued to pitch in relief for Portland and the Pawtucket Red Sox of the Class AAA International League. The Red Sox invited Huntzinger to spring training in 2013, and then assigned him to Pawtucket. After the 2013 season, Huntzinger became a minor league free agent.

The Baltimore Orioles signed Huntzinger to a minor league contract with an invitation to spring training in 2014, where he competed for a spot in the Orioles' bullpen. The Orioles assigned Huntzinger to minor league camp in March.

On December 15, 2014, the Oakland A's signed him to a minor league contract with an invitation to spring training. He played the entire 2015 season with the Triple-A Nashville Sounds, and elected to become a free agent after the season.

On May 9, 2016, Huntzinger signed a minor league deal with the Chicago White Sox. He was released on June 18, 2016.

== Coaching career ==
On July 14, 2022, Huntzinger was named pitching coach for the Michigan Wolverines baseball team for the 2022–23 season.
