= 2022 Iowa Hawkeyes baseball team =

College Baseball Season

2022 Iowa Hawkeyes baseball
- Conference: Big Ten Conference
- Record: 36–19 (17–7 Big Ten)
- Head coach: Rick Heller (9th season)
- Assistant coach: Marty Sutherland (9th season)
- Hitting coach: David Pearson (1st season)
- Pitching coach: Robin Lund (4th season)
- Home stadium: Duane Banks Field

2022 Big Ten Conference baseball standings
	Conf.				Overall
Team	W		L	PCT	W		L	PCT
No. 12 Maryland ‍†‍‍^{y}	18	–	5	.783	48	–	13	.787
Rutgers ‍‍‍	17	–	7	.708	44	–	15	.746
Iowa ‍‍‍	17	–	7	.708	36	–	19	.655
Illinois ‍‍‍	17	–	7	.708	31	–	22	.585
Michigan ‍‍‡‍^{y}	12	–	12	.500	34	–	28	.548
Penn State ‍‍‍	11	–	13	.458	26	–	29	.473
Purdue ‍‍‍	9	–	12	.429	29	–	21	.580
Indiana ‍‍‍	10	–	14	.417	27	–	32	.458
Northwestern ‍‍‍	10	–	14	.417	24	–	27	.471
Nebraska ‍‍‍	10	–	14	.417	23	–	30	.434
Ohio State ‍‍‍	8	–	14	.364	21	–	30	.412
Michigan State ‍‍‍	8	–	16	.333	24	–	30	.444
Minnesota ‍‍‍	6	–	18	.250	16	–	36	.308
† – Conference champion ‡ – Tournament champion y – Invited to the NCAA tournament As of June 6, 2022; Rankings from D1Baseball

The Iowa Hawkeyes baseball team was a baseball team that represented the University of Iowa in the 2022 NCAA Division I baseball season. The Hawkeyes were members of the Big Ten Conference and played their home games at Duane Banks Field in Iowa City, Iowa. They were led by ninth-year head coach Rick Heller.

== Previous season ==
The Hawkeyes finished the 2021 NCAA Division I baseball season 26–18 overall (26–18 conference) and tied for fourth place in conference standings, as the season was limited to only conference games for all Big Ten teams due to the COVID-19 pandemic.

== Preseason ==
Hitting coach Jimmy Frankos was not retained by the team, and he was replaced by North Dakota State hitting coach, David Pearson.

For the 2022 Big Ten Conference poll, Iowa was voted to third in first by the Big Ten Coaches.

== Roster ==
2022 Iowa Hawkeyes baseball team
Players
Coaches

#	Pos.	Name	B/T	Height	Weight	Year	Previous school	Home town
1	RHP	Jacob Henderson	R/R	6 ft 0 in (1.83 m)	180 lb (82 kg)	RS So	Mesquite H. S.	Gilbert, Arizona
2	INF	Brendan Sher	R/R	6 ft 1 in (1.85 m)	200 lb (91 kg)	RS Jr	Indianola Community H. S.	Indianola, Iowa
3		Sam Link	R/R	6 ft 0 in (1.83 m)	195 lb (88 kg)	RS So	Dubuque Senior H. S.	Dubuque, Iowa
4	OF	Brayden Frazier	R/R	6 ft 0 in (1.83 m)	195 lb (88 kg)	RS So	Jefferson H. S.	Cedar Rapids, Iowa
5		Anthony Mangano	L/R	6 ft 0 in (1.83 m)	185 lb (84 kg)	So	Lake Zurich H. S.	Lake Zurich, Illinois
6		Alec Nigut	L/L	6 ft 0 in (1.83 m)	205 lb (93 kg)	RS Fr	Theodore Roosevelt H. S.	Des Moines, Iowa
7		Keaton Anthony	R/R	6 ft 4 in (1.93 m)	211 lb (96 kg)	RS Fr	Mill Creek H. S.	Hoschton, Georgia
8	OF	D. J. Heck	R/R	6 ft 0 in (1.83 m)	195 lb (88 kg)	RS So	Iowa City H. S.	Iowa City, Iowa
9	OF	Kyle Huckstorf	R/R	5 ft 8 in (1.73 m)	175 lb (79 kg)	RS So	Iowa Western C.C.	Waterford, Wisconsin
10	INF	Michael Seegers	R/R	5 ft 10 in (1.78 m)	160 lb (73 kg)	So	Home School	Oconomowoc, Wisconsin
11	INF	Izaya Fullard	R/R	5 ft 11 in (1.8 m)	230 lb (104 kg)	RS Sr	Kirkwood C. C.	North Liberty, Iowa
12	C	Ben Tallman	R/R	6 ft 0 in (1.83 m)	205 lb (93 kg)	RS So	North Iowa Area C. C.	Billings, Montana
13	INF	Mitch Wood	R/R	6 ft 2 in (1.88 m)	205 lb (93 kg)	Fr	Ottumwa H. S.	Ottumwa, Iowa
14	RHP	Brody Brecht	R/R	6 ft 4 in (1.93 m)	205 lb (93 kg)	RS Fr	Ankeny H. S.	Ankeny, Iowa
16	C	Ty Snep	L/R	6 ft 2 in (1.88 m)	225 lb (102 kg)	RS So	Lake Zurich H. S.	Lake Zurich, Illinois
17		Andy Nelson	R/R	6 ft 0 in (1.83 m)	195 lb (88 kg)	So	Wheaton North H. S.	Winfield, Illinois
18		Weston Fulk	R/L	6 ft 4 in (1.93 m)	220 lb (100 kg)	Fr	Ankeny H. S.	Ankeny, Iowa
19	INF	Ben Wilmes	R/R	6 ft 0 in (1.83 m)	175 lb (79 kg)	Fr	Johnston H. S.	Johnston, Iowa
20	RHP	Marcus Morgan	L/R	6 ft 2 in (1.88 m)	200 lb (91 kg)	Fr	Iowa City West H. S.	Iowa City, Iowa
22	RHP	Tyson James	R/R	6 ft 4 in (1.93 m)	250 lb (113 kg)	So	Webster Groves H. S.	Webster Groves, Missouri
24	RHP	Connor Schultz	R/R	6 ft 4 in (1.93 m)	225 lb (102 kg)	RS Sr	Cedar Falls H. S.	Cedar Rapids, Iowa
25		Dylan Nedved	R/R	6 ft 2 in (1.88 m)	195 lb (88 kg)	RS Sr	Hutchinson C. C.	Shawnee, Kansas
26	LHP	Jared Simpson	L/L	6 ft 4 in (1.93 m)	205 lb (93 kg)	RS Jr	Iowa Western C.C.	Clinton, Iowa
27	RHP	Ty Langenberg	R/R	6 ft 2 in (1.88 m)	195 lb (88 kg)	So	Urbandale H. S.	Urbandale, Iowa
28	INF	Sam Hojnar	S/R	6 ft 2 in (1.88 m)	185 lb (84 kg)	RS So	Heartland C. C.	Naperville, Illinois
29	LHP	Ben Beutel	L/L	6 ft 0 in (1.83 m)	165 lb (75 kg)	RS Sr	Allen C. C.	Davenport, Iowa
31	INF	Sam Petersen	R/R	6 ft 0 in (1.83 m)	195 lb (88 kg)	Fr	Ballard H. S.	Huxley, Iowa
32	C	Brett McCleary	R/R	6 ft 2 in (1.88 m)	220 lb (100 kg)	RS Sr	Iowa City H. S.	Iowa City, Iowa
33	RHP	Adam Mazur	R/R	6 ft 2 in (1.88 m)	180 lb (82 kg)	RS So	Woodbury H. S.	Woodbury, Minnesota
31	RHP	Luke Llewellyn	R/R	6 ft 4 in (1.93 m)	220 lb (100 kg)	RS So	Kirkwood C. C.	Urbandale, Iowa
35	LHP	Cam Baumann	L/L	6 ft 2 in (1.88 m)	200 lb (91 kg)	RS Sr	Fairfield H. S.	Fairfield, Iowa
37	RHP	Casey Day	R/R	6 ft 3 in (1.91 m)	220 lb (100 kg)	RS So	Kirkwood C. C.	Ely, Iowa
38	OF	Coy Sarsfield	R/R	5 ft 8 in (1.73 m)	165 lb (75 kg)	Fr	Linn-Mar H. S.	Marion, Iowa
40	C	Cade Moss	R/R	5 ft 10 in (1.78 m)	170 lb (77 kg)	So	Kirkwood C. C.	Johnston, Iowa
41	RHP	Chas Wheatley	R/R	6 ft 6 in (1.98 m)	215 lb (98 kg)	Fr	Strathcona H.S.	Edmonton, Alberta
42		Will Mulflur	R/R	5 ft 11 in (1.8 m)	200 lb (91 kg)	So	Tacoma C. C.	Mercer Island, Washington
43	C	Gehrig Christensen	L/R	6 ft 1 in (1.85 m)	185 lb (84 kg)	Fr	Urbandale H. S.	Urbandale, Iowa
44	RHP	Duncan Davitt	R/R	6 ft 3 in (1.91 m)	235 lb (107 kg)	RS Jr	Indianola Community H. S.	Indianola, Iowa
45	INF	Peyton Williams	L/L	6 ft 5 in (1.96 m)	255 lb (116 kg)	RS So	Johnston H. S.	Johnston, Iowa
47	RHP	Will Christopher	R/R	6 ft 4 in (1.93 m)	210 lb (95 kg)	So	Pleasant Valley H. S.	Bettendorf, Iowa
50	LHP	Benjamin DeTaeye	L/L	6 ft 0 in (1.83 m)	195 lb (88 kg)	RS So	Iowa Central C.C.	Clive, Iowa
51	RHP	Jackson Payne	R/R	6 ft 4 in (1.93 m)	195 lb (88 kg)	So	Waukee H. S.	Clive, Iowa

Head coach

Rick Heller

Assistant coach(es)

Hitting coach(es)

David Pearson

Base coach(es)

Marty Sutherland

Pitching coach(es)

Robin Lund

Legend

- (C) Team captain
- (S) Suspended
- (I) Ineligible
- Injured
- Current redshirt

Roster
Last update: February 18, 2022

== Schedule ==
2022 Iowa Hawkeyes baseball game log
Regular season
February (4–2)

#	Date	Opponent	Site/stadium	Score	Win	Loss	Save	Attendance	Overall record	B1G record
1	February 18	vs Air Force	Wando River Field • Charleston, South Carolina	12–2	Mazur (1–0)	Skenes (0–1)	None	120	1–0	–
2	February 19	vs Ball State	Detyens Field • Charleston, South Carolina	11–1	Brecht (1–0)	Schweitzer (0–1)	None	132	2–0	–
3	February 20	vs Bucknell	Detyens Field • Charleston, South Carolina	3–0	Langenberg (1–0)	Odell (0–1)	Nedved (1)	97	3–0	–
4	February 25	vs Pepperdine	Whataburger Field • Corpus Christi, Texas	3–1	Mazur (2–0)	Llewllyn (0–1)	Nedved (2)	–	4–0	–
5	February 26	at Texas A&M–Corpus Christi	Whataburger Field • Corpus Christi, Texas	1–2	Bird (1–0)	Davitt (0–1)	None	631	4–1	–
6	February 27	vs Wichita State	Whataburger Field • Corpus Christi, Texas	7–8	McDonough (1–1)	Brecht (1–1)	Holden (1)	–	4–2	–

March (8–7)

#	Date	Opponent	Site/stadium	Score	Win	Loss	Save	Attendance	Overall record	B1G record
7	March 1	Loras	Duane Banks Field • Iowa City, Iowa	1–3	Pasco (1–0)	Simpson (0–1)	Peters (1)	677	4–3	–
8	March 2	Cornell (IA)	Duane Banks Field • Iowa City, Iowa	8–0	Davitt (1–1)	Miller (0–1)	None	538	5–3	–
9	March 4	vs Wichita State	Riders Field • Frisco, Texas	4–6	Bye (1–0)	Christophers (0–1)	Holden (3)	5,672	5–4	–
10	March 5	vs Texas A&M	Riders Field • Frisco, Texas	3–7	Palisch (1–1)	Brecht (1–2)	None	7,712	5–5	–
11	March 6	Washington State	Riders Field • Frisco, Texas	6–5	Langenberg (2–0)	Hoeft (1–2)	Day (1)	–	6–5	–
12	March 9	St. Thomas	Duane Banks Field • Iowa City, Iowa	Game cancelled						
13	March 11	at UC Irvine	Anteater Ballpark • Irvine, California	6–7	Antone (1–0)	Christophers (0–2)	Taylor (2)	576	6–6	–
14	March 12	at UC Irvine	Anteater Ballpark • Irvine, California	1–2	Ingebritson (2–0)	Nedved (0–1)	None	804	6–7	–
15	March 13	at UC Irvine	Anteater Ballpark • Irvine, California	12–10	Langenberg (3–0)	Suarez (0–1)	Llewellyn (1)	647	7–7	–
16	March 15	at San Diego State	Tony Gwynn Stadium • San Diego, California	6–4	Davitt (2-1)	Carrigg (0-1)	Day (2)	344	8–7	–
17	March 18	No. 17 Texas Tech	Duane Banks Field • Iowa City, Iowa	Game cancelled						
18	March 19	No. 17 Texas Tech	Duane Banks Field • Iowa City, Iowa	3–11	Birdsell (3–1)	Mazur (2–1)	None	1,043	8–8	–
19	March 20	No. 17 Texas Tech	Duane Banks Field • Iowa City, Iowa	6–3	Nedved (1–1)	Molina (1–2)	None	1,290	9–8	–
20	March 21	St. Thomas	Duane Banks Field • Iowa City, Iowa	6–5	Beutel (1–0)	Dailey (0–1)	Llewellyn (2)	657	10–8	–
21	March 23	Grand View	Duane Banks Field • Iowa City, Iowa	Game cancelled						
22	March 25	Central Michigan	Duane Banks Field • Iowa City, Iowa	7–4	Henderson (1–0)	Insco (0–1)	Llewellyn (3)	563	11–8	–
23	March 26	Central Michigan	Duane Banks Field • Iowa City, Iowa	1–10	Navarra (3–2)	Nedved (1–2)	None	937	11–9	–
24	March 27	Central Michigan	Duane Banks Field • Iowa City, Iowa	4–2	Llewellyn (1–0)	Jones (1–1)	Henderson (1)	589	12–9	–
25	March 29	at Illinois State	Duffy Bass Field • Normal, Illinois	Game cancelled						

April (13–4)

#	Date	Opponent	Site/stadium	Score	Win	Loss	Save	Attendance	Overall record	B1G record
26	April 1	at Michigan	Ray Fisher Stadium • Ann Arbor, Michigan	8–2	Nedved (2–2)	Weston (1–2)	None	1,200	13–9	1–0
27	April 2	at Michigan	Ray Fisher Stadium • Ann Arbor, Michigan	0–2	O'Halloran (3–2)	Mazur (2–2)	Allen (3)	1,605	13–10	1–1
28	April 3	at Michigan	Ray Fisher Stadium • Ann Arbor, Michigan	10–3	Langenberg (4–0)	Denner (3–3)	None	1,008	14–10	2–1
29	April 6	at Bradley	Dozer Park • Peoria, Illinois	9–8	Davitt (3–1)	Campbell (0–2)	None	304	15–10	2–1
30	April 9	Illinois	Duane Banks Field • Iowa City, Iowa	4–2	Nedved (3–2)	Kirschsieper (4–2)	Beutel (1)	1,226	16–10	3–1
31	April 9	Illinois	Duane Banks Field • Iowa City, Iowa	5–7	Glassey (1–0)	DeTaeye (0–1)	None	1,226	16–11	3–2
32	April 10	Illinois	Duane Banks Field • Iowa City, Iowa	5–9	Green (1–1)	Llewellyn (1–1)	None	1,084	16–12	3–3
33	April 12	at Milwaukee	Franklin Field • Franklin, Wisconsin	16–2	Schultz (1–0)	Schulfer (2–1)	None	455	17–12	3–3
34	April 15	Minnesota	Duane Banks Field • Iowa City, Iowa	9–3	Mazur (3–2)	Ireland (3–3)	None	946	18–12	4–3
35	April 16	Minnesota	Duane Banks Field • Iowa City, Iowa	2–1	Beutel (2–0)	Massey (2–5)	Davitt (1)	962	19–12	5–3
36	April 17	Minnesota	Duane Banks Field • Iowa City, Iowa	9–3	Nedved (4–2)	Semb (1–4)	None	646	20–12	6–3
37	April 19	Bradley	Duane Banks Field • Iowa City, Iowa	15–8	Wheatley (1–0)	Day (1–4)	None	437	21–12	6–3
38	April 22	at No. 8 Rutgers	Bainton Field • Piscataway, New Jersey	4–1	Mazur (4–2)	Kollar (6–1)	Nedved (3)	1,052	22–12	7–3
39	April 23	at No. 8 Rutgers	Bainton Field • Piscataway, New Jersey	12–2	Schultz (2–0)	Florence (4–2)	None	753	23–12	8–3
40	April 24	at No. 8 Rutgers	Bainton Field • Piscataway, New Jersey	4–10	Bello (4–0)	Langenberg (4–1)	None	862	23–13	8–4
41	April 26	Western Illinois	Duane Banks Field • Iowa City, Iowa	11–1	DeTaeye (1–1)	Greenan (0–3)	None	662	24–13	8–4
42	April 29	at Nebraska	Haymarket Park • Lincoln, Nebraska	1–0	Mazur (5–2)	Schanaman (2–7)	None	4,835	25–13	9–4

May (8–4)

#	Date	Opponent	Site/stadium	Score	Win	Loss	Save	Attendance	Overall record	B1G record
43	May 1	at Nebraska	Haymarket Park • Lincoln, Nebraska	1–12	Olson (2–3)	Schultz (2–1)	None	5,741	25–14	9–5
44	May 1	at Nebraska	Haymarket Park • Lincoln, Nebraska	5–3	Nedved (5–2)	Bragg (1–5)	Beutel (2)	5,741	26–14	10–5
45	May 3	Illinois State	Duane Banks Field • Iowa City, Iowa	2–3	Kubiatowicz (3–2)	Brecht (1–3)	Hart (2)	534	26–15	10–5
46	May 6	Purdue	Duane Banks Field • Iowa City, Iowa	5–2	Mazur (6–2)	Backer (2–1)	Buetel (3)	826	27–15	11–5
47	May 7	Purdue	Duane Banks Field • Iowa City, Iowa	6–10	Wendell (5–2)	Schultz (2–2)	None	1,734	27–16	11–6
48	May 8	Purdue	Duane Banks Field • Iowa City, Iowa	9–1	Langenberg (5–1)	Danzeisen (1–1)	None	1,082	28–16	12–6
49	May 13	at Michigan State	Drayton McLane Baseball Stadium at John H. Kobs Field • East Lansing, Michigan	5–0	Mazur (7–2)	Tomasic (3–4)	None	559	29–16	13–6
50	May 14	at Michigan State	Drayton McLane Baseball Stadium at John H. Kobs Field • East Lansing, Michigan	12–2	Beutel (3–0)	Powers (3–7)	None	442	30–16	14–6
51	May 15	at Michigan State	Drayton McLane Baseball Stadium at John H. Kobs Field • East Lansing, Michigan	8–11	Cook (1–4)	Langenberg (5–2)	Bischoff (11)	883	30–17	14–7
52	May 17	at UIC	Les Miller Field at Curtis Granderson Stadium • Chicago, Illinois	Game cancelled						
53	May 19	Indiana	Duane Banks Field • Iowa City, Iowa	30–16	Davitt (4–1)	Hayden (4–1)	None	1,194	31–17	15–7
54	May 20	Indiana	Duane Banks Field • Iowa City, Iowa	12–0	Nedved (6–2)	Perkins (3–3)	None	2,019	32–17	16–7
55	May 21	Indiana	Duane Banks Field • Iowa City, Iowa	2–1	Langenberg (5–2)	Brehmer (4–4)	Buetel (4)	1,224	33–17	17–7

Postseason
Big Ten Conference Tournament (3–2)

#	Date	Opponent	Site/stadium	Score	Win	Loss	Save	Attendance	Overall record	B1G record
56	May 26	vs Penn State	Charles Schwab Field Omaha • Omaha, Nebraska	2–5	Shingledeck (7–3)	Mazur (7–3)	Luensmann (2)	–	33–18	17–7
57	May 27	vs Purdue	Charles Schwab Field Omaha • Omaha, Nebraska	5–4	Christophersen (1–2)	Weins (3–4)	None	–	34–18	17–7
58	May 28	vs Penn State	Charles Schwab Field Omaha • Omaha, Nebraska	11–3	Langenberg (6–2)	Mellott (3–5)	None	–	35–18	17–7
59	May 28	vs Michigan	Charles Schwab Field Omaha • Omaha, Nebraska	11–3	Baumann (1–0)	Allen (7–2)	Schultz (1)	–	36–18	17–7
60	May 29	vs Michigan	Charles Schwab Field Omaha • Omaha, Nebraska	1–13	O'Halloran (5–4)	Brecht (1–4)	Weston (4)	–	36–19	17–7

== Awards ==
=== Big Ten Conference Players of the Week ===
Weekly Awards
Player	Award	Date Awarded	Ref.
Adam Mazur	Pitcher of the Week	February 23, 2022	
Keaton Anthony	Freshman of the Week	February 23, 2022	
Adam Mazur	Pitcher of the Week	March 2, 2022	
Keaton Anthony	Freshman of the Week	April 5, 2022	
Keaton Anthony	Freshman of the Week	April 19, 2022	
Peyton Williams	Player of the Week	April 27, 2022	
Connor Schultz	Pitcher of the Week	April 27, 2022	
Ty Langenberg	Co-Pitcher of the Week	May 11, 2022	
Kyle Huckstorf	Co-Player of the Week	May 24, 2022	
Dylan Nedved	Pitcher of the Week	May 24, 2022	
Keaton Anthony	Freshman of the Week	May 24, 2022	

=== Conference awards ===
Awards
Player	Award	Date Awarded	Ref.
Adam Mazur	Big Ten Pitcher of the Year	May 24, 2022	
Keaton Anthony	Big Ten Freshman of the Year	May 24, 2022	
Peyton Williams	First Team All-Big Ten	May 24, 2022	
Adam Mazur	First Team All-Big Ten	May 24, 2022	
Keaton Anthony	Second Team All-Big Ten	May 24, 2022	
Ben Beutel	Second Team All-Big Ten	May 24, 2022	
Keaton Anthony	Freshman Team All-Big Ten	May 24, 2022	
Brody Brecht	Freshman Team All-Big Ten	May 24, 2022	

== Rankings ==
Ranking movements Legend: ██ Increase in ranking ██ Decrease in ranking — = Not ranked RV = Received votes
	Week																		
Poll	Pre	1	2	3	4	5	6	7	8	9	10	11	12	13	14	15	16	17	Final
Coaches'	—	—*	RV	—	—	—	—	—	—	—	—	—	—	—					
Baseball America	—	—	—	—	—	—	—	—	—	—	—	—	—	—					
Collegiate Baseball^	—	—	—	—	—	—	—	—	—	—	—	—	—	—					
NCBWA†	—	—	—	—	—	—	—	—	—	—	RV	RV	—	—					
D1Baseball	—	—	—	—	—	—	—	—	—	—	—	—	—	—					

^ Collegiate Baseball ranked 40 teams in their preseason poll, but only ranked 30 teams weekly during the season.
† NCBWA ranks 30 teams in their preseason poll, but only ranks 25 teams weekly during the season.
* A new poll was not released for this week, so for comparison purposes, the previous week's ranking is inserted in this week's slot.
