= 2022 Purdue Boilermakers baseball team =

American college baseball season

2022 Purdue Boilermakers baseball
- Conference: Big Ten Conference
- Record: 29–21 (9–12 Big Ten)
- Head coach: Greg Goff (3rd season)
- Assistant coach: Daniel Furuto (1st season)
- Hitting coach: Terry Rooney (1st season)
- Pitching coach: Chris Marx (3rd season)
- Home stadium: Alexander Field

2022 Big Ten Conference baseball standings
	Conf.				Overall
Team	W		L	PCT	W		L	PCT
No. 12 Maryland ‍†‍‍^{y}	18	–	5	.783	48	–	13	.787
Rutgers ‍‍‍	17	–	7	.708	44	–	15	.746
Iowa ‍‍‍	17	–	7	.708	36	–	19	.655
Illinois ‍‍‍	17	–	7	.708	31	–	22	.585
Michigan ‍‍‡‍^{y}	12	–	12	.500	34	–	28	.548
Penn State ‍‍‍	11	–	13	.458	26	–	29	.473
Purdue ‍‍‍	9	–	12	.429	29	–	21	.580
Indiana ‍‍‍	10	–	14	.417	27	–	32	.458
Northwestern ‍‍‍	10	–	14	.417	24	–	27	.471
Nebraska ‍‍‍	10	–	14	.417	23	–	30	.434
Ohio State ‍‍‍	8	–	14	.364	21	–	30	.412
Michigan State ‍‍‍	8	–	16	.333	24	–	30	.444
Minnesota ‍‍‍	6	–	18	.250	16	–	36	.308
† – Conference champion ‡ – Tournament champion y – Invited to the NCAA tournament As of June 6, 2022; Rankings from D1Baseball

The Purdue Boilermakers baseball team was a baseball team that represented Purdue University in the 2022 NCAA Division I baseball season. The Boilermakers were members of the Big Ten Conference and played their home games at Alexander Field in West Lafayette, Indiana. They were led by third-year head coach Greg Goff.

On February 26, 2022, concluding series sweeps against Princeton and South Dakota State, the Boilermakers opened 8–0, their best start since 1909.

== Previous season ==
The Boilermakers finished the 2021 NCAA Division I baseball season 16–26 overall (16–26 conference) and eleventh place in the conference standings, as the season was limited to only conference games for all Big Ten teams due to the COVID-19 pandemic. Following the season, assistant coach Cooper Fouts left the Boilermakers for an assistant coaching position with Louisiana Tech. On July 29, 2021, Purdue hired Terry Rooney was hired to replace Fouts.

== Roster ==
2022 Purdue Boilermakers baseball team
Players
Coaches

#	Pos.	Name	B/T	Height	Weight	Year	Previous school	Home town
1	OF	Mike Bolton Jr.	L/R	5 ft 9 in (1.75 m)	155 lb (70 kg)	Jr	Brother Rice H. S.	Calumet City, Illinois
2	INF	Tyler Powers	R/R	5 ft 9 in (1.75 m)	155 lb (70 kg)	Sr	Lafayette Central Catholics Jr/Sr H. S.	Lafayette, Indiana
3	OF	Tanner Haston	R/R	5 ft 11 in (1.8 m)	175 lb (79 kg)	RS Jr	Mooresville H. S.	Mooresville, Indiana
4		Cam Thompson	R/R	6 ft 2 in (1.88 m)	200 lb (91 kg)	RS So	Owasso High School	Owasso, Oklahoma
5	INF	Evan Albrecht	R/R	5 ft 10 in (1.78 m)	150 lb (68 kg)	Sr	West Bend West H. S.	West Bend, Wisconsin
6	OF	Weston Gingerich	L/L	5 ft 10 in (1.78 m)	160 lb (73 kg)	RS Fr	St. Theodore Guerin H. S.	Carmel, Indiana
7	OF	Sam Franco	R/R	6 ft 1 in (1.85 m)	210 lb (95 kg)	Sr	Clarkstown H. S. South	Bardonia, New York
8	INF	Troy Viola	R/R	6 ft 2 in (1.88 m)	225 lb (102 kg)	RS Sr	Summit H. S.	Bend, Oregon
9	INF	Ryan Howe	R/R	6 ft 2 in (1.88 m)	180 lb (82 kg)	Sr	Prospect H. S.	Mount Prospect, Illinois
10	INF	C. J. Valdez	R/R	6 ft 0 in (1.83 m)	185 lb (84 kg)	Jr	Yavapai College	Gilbert, Arizona
11	INF	Will Allen	R/R	6 ft 4 in (1.93 m)	205 lb (93 kg)	Fr	Houston Christian H. S.	Houston, Texas
13	INF	Ty Gill	L/R	6 ft 2 in (1.88 m)	155 lb (70 kg)	Fr	Valparaiso H. S.	Valparaiso, Indiana
14	RHP	Khal Stephen	R/R	6 ft 4 in (1.93 m)	215 lb (98 kg)	Fr	Seeger H. S.	Williamsport, Indiana
15	OF	Curtis Washington Jr.	R/R	6 ft 2 in (1.88 m)	180 lb (82 kg)	Jr	Wabash Valley College	West Memphis, Arkansas
16	RHP	Nolan Daniel	R/R	6 ft 4 in (1.93 m)	225 lb (102 kg)	RS Sr	Tallahassee Community College	Dublin, Georgia
17	LHP	Jackson Smeltz	L/L	6 ft 3 in (1.91 m)	210 lb (95 kg)	RS Jr	McCutcheon H. S.	Lafayette, Indiana
18		David Jeon	R/R	6 ft 0 in (1.83 m)	225 lb (102 kg)	Fr	Coppell H. S.	Coppell, Texas
19	OF	Pat Clohisy	L/L	5 ft 10 in (1.78 m)	190 lb (86 kg)	RS Fr	Chaminade Prep	St. Louis, Missouri
20	OF	Jake Jarvis	L/R	6 ft 2 in (1.88 m)	205 lb (93 kg)	Sr	Central Arizona College	Gilbert, Arizona
22	C	Steve Ramirez	R/R	5 ft 11 in (1.8 m)	195 lb (88 kg)	Sr	Riverside City College	San Bernardino, California
23	INF	Paul Toetz	R/R	5 ft 11 in (1.8 m)	190 lb (86 kg)	RS So	Greendale H. S.	Greendale, Wisconsin
25	C	Jake Stadler	L/R	6 ft 0 in (1.83 m)	190 lb (86 kg)	RS Fr	Mount Vernon H. S.	Greenfield, Indiana
26	RHP	Logan Danzeisen	L/R	6 ft 2 in (1.88 m)	205 lb (93 kg)	RS Fr	Sylvania Southview H. S.	Sylvania, Ohio
27	OF	Jack Firestone	L/R	6 ft 2 in (1.88 m)	195 lb (88 kg)	RS So	Zionsville Community H. S.	Zionsville, Indiana
29	C	Pablo Lanzarote	R/R	6 ft 0 in (1.83 m)	205 lb (93 kg)	Jr	Hinds Community College	Barquisimeto, Venezuela
30	OF	Cam Hill	R/R	6 ft 4 in (1.93 m)	205 lb (93 kg)	Fr	Brother Rice H. S.	Chicago, Illinois
31		Zach Fletcher	L/L	6 ft 2 in (1.88 m)	200 lb (91 kg)	Fr	Bedford H. S.	Bedford, New Hampshire
32	RHP	C. J. Backer	R/R	6 ft 7 in (2.01 m)	165 lb (75 kg)	So	Danville Area Community College	Newburgh, Indiana
33	RHP	Landon Weins	R/R	6 ft 2 in (1.88 m)	180 lb (82 kg)	Sr	Wabash Valley College	Frankton, Indiana
34	INF	Cade Hohl	R/R	5 ft 10 in (1.78 m)	180 lb (82 kg)	RS Fr	St. Louis University H. S.	Huntleigh, Missouri
35	LHP	Troy Wansing	L/L	6 ft 4 in (1.93 m)	215 lb (98 kg)	Fr	Staley H. S.	Kansas City, Missouri
36	RHP	Carter Doorn	R/R	6 ft 3 in (1.91 m)	175 lb (79 kg)	Fr	Lake Central H. S.	Schererville, Indiana
37	LHP	Joe Whitman	L/L	6 ft 3 in (1.91 m)	185 lb (84 kg)	So	Hudson H. S.	Hudson, Ohio
38	RHP	Kyle Wade	R/R	6 ft 2 in (1.88 m)	225 lb (102 kg)	Sr	Kokomo H. S.	Kokomo, Indiana
40	LHP	Calvin Schapira	R/L	6 ft 5 in (1.96 m)	30 lb (14 kg)	Sr	Central Arizona College	Scottsdale, Arizona
41	RHP	Ricky Castro	R/R	6 ft 1 in (1.85 m)	195 lb (88 kg)	RS Sr	Parkland College	Naperville, Illinois
42		Robert Mannino	R/R	5 ft 11 in (1.8 m)	195 lb (88 kg)	Fr	P27 Academy	Marlboro, New Jersey
43	RHP	Avery Cook	R/R	6 ft 6 in (1.98 m)	235 lb (107 kg)	RS So	Whitesboro H. S.	Utica, New York
44	INF	Jake Parr	R/R	6 ft 7 in (2.01 m)	210 lb (95 kg)	Jr	Buckhorn H. S.	New Market, Alabama
45	RHP	Jett Jackson	R/R	6 ft 4 in (1.93 m)	180 lb (82 kg)	Jr	Dickson County H. S.	Burns, Tennessee
46	RHP	Wyatt Wendell	R/R	6 ft 5 in (1.96 m)	215 lb (98 kg)	Jr	Indian Hills Community College	Castle Rock, Colorado
47	RHP	Eric Hildebrand	R/R	6 ft 0 in (1.83 m)	170 lb (77 kg)	Sr	Anchor Bay H. S.	Chesterfield, Michigan
48	RHP	Griffin Lohman	L/R	6 ft 5 in (1.96 m)	190 lb (86 kg)	So	Hamilton Southeastern H. S.	Fishers, Indiana

Head coach

39 Greg Goff

Assistant coach(es)

Hitting coach(es)

Terry Rooney

Base coach(es)

50 Daniel Furuto

Pitching coach(es)

21 Chris Marx

Legend

- (C) Team captain
- (S) Suspended
- (I) Ineligible
- Injured
- Current redshirt

Roster
Last update: December 16, 2021

== Schedule ==
2022 Purdue Boilermakers baseball game log
Regular season
February (8–0)

#	Date	Opponent	Site/stadium	Score	Win	Loss	Save	Attendance	Overall record	B1G record
1	February 18	vs South Dakota State	Constellation Field • Sugar Land, Texas	5–4	Weins (1–0)	Goble (0–1)	Lohman (1)	250	1–0	–
2	February 19	vs South Dakota State	Constellation Field • Sugar Land, Texas	11–1	Smeltz (1–0)	Carlson (0–1)	Castro (1)	350	2–0	–
3	February 19	vs South Dakota State	Constellation Field • Sugar Land, Texas	14–3	Wansing (1–0)	Bishop (0–1)	None	350	3–0	–
4	February 20	vs South Dakota State	Constellation Field • Sugar Land, Texas	10–7	Wade (1–0)	Beazley (0–1)	Hildebrand (1)	288	4–0	–
5	February 25	vs Princeton	Ting Stadium • Holly Springs, North Carolina	9–3	Smeltz (2–0)	Emus (0–1)	None	255	5–0	–
6	February 25	vs Princeton	Ting Stadium • Holly Springs, North Carolina	8–3	Wendell (1–0)	Rabin (0–1)	None	436	6–0	–
7	February 26	vs Princeton	Ting Stadium • Holly Springs, North Carolina	4–3	Hildebrand (1–0)	Hoefer (0–1)	None	508	7–0	–
8	February 26	vs Princeton	Ting Stadium • Holly Springs, North Carolina	5–4	Stephen (1–0)	Scannell (0–1)	None	240	8–0	–

March (10–2)

#	Date	Opponent	Site/stadium	Score	Win	Loss	Save	Attendance	Overall record	B1G record
9	March 2	at Charlotte	Robert and Mariam Hayes Stadium • Charlotte, North Carolina	6–2	Wendell (2–0)	Thompson (0–1)	Stephen (1)	655	9–0	–
10	March 4	vs Longwood	Ting Stadium • Holly Springs, North Carolina	6–1	Smeltz (3–0)	Potojecki (1–1)	None	271	10–0	–
11	March 5	vs Longwood	Ting Stadium • Holly Springs, North Carolina	6–5	Castro (1–0)	Karlinchak (0–1)	None	611	11–0	–
12	March 6	vs Longwood	Ting Stadium • Holly Springs, North Carolina	6–5	Stephen (1–0)	Parrish (0–1)	None	703	12–0	–
13	March 10	Bellarmine	Alexander Field • West Lafayette, Indiana	8–4	Smetlz (4–0)	Pender (0–3)	Weins (1)	1,135	13–0	–
	March 12	Bellarmine	Alexander Field • West Lafayette, Indiana	Game cancelled						
14	March 13	Bellarmine	Alexander Field • West Lafayette, Indiana	7–4	Backer (1–0)	Braunecker (0–3)	Stephen (2)	1,087	14–0	–
15	March 15	Dayton	Alexander Field • West Lafayette, Indiana	11–2	Wansing (2–0)	Hattrup (1–1)	None	1,165	15–0	–
16	March 17	at Illinois State	Duffy Bass Field • Normal, Illinois	3–4	Mabee (2–0)	Stephen (2–1)	None	727	15–1	–
	March 18	at Illinois State	Duffy Bass Field • Normal, Illinois	Game cancelled						
17	March 20	Illinois State	Alexander Field • West Lafayette, Indiana	9–2	Wansing (3–0)	Foy (0–1)	None	1,594	16–1	–
18	March 20	Illinois State	Alexander Field • West Lafayette, Indiana	7–6	Danzeisen (1–0)	Kubiatowicz (0–1)	None	1,594	17–1	–
	March 22	Northern Illinois	Alexander Field • West Lafayette, Indiana	Game postponed						
19	March 25	Ohio State	Alexander Field • West Lafayette, Indiana	7–5	Weins (2–0)	Johnson (0–1)	None	1,219	18–1	1–0
	March 26	Ohio State	Alexander Field • West Lafayette, Indiana	Game cancelled						
	March 27	Ohio State	Alexander Field • West Lafayette, Indiana	Game cancelled						
20	March 29	UIC	Alexander Field • West Lafayette, Indiana	9–10	Gould (1–0)	Weins (2–1)	Zahora (1)	1,070	18–2	1–0
	March 30	at Indiana State	Bob Warn Field at Sycamore Stadium • Terre Haute, Indiana	Game cancelled						

April (6–11)

#	Date	Opponent	Site/stadium	Score	Win	Loss	Save	Attendance	Overall record	B1G record
21	April 1	at Illinois	Illinois Field • Champaign, Illinois	1–8	Rybarczyk (1–1)	Weins (2–2)	None	841	18–3	1–1
22	April 2	at Illinois	Illinois Field • Champaign, Illinois	10–11	Glassey (1–0)	Wendell (3–1)	Green (1)	474	18–4	1–2
23	April 3	at Illinois	Illinois Field • Champaign, Illinois	8–11	Wenninger (1–2)	Stephen (1–2)	None	1,529	18–5	1–3
24	April 5	Northern Illinois	Alexander Field • West Lafayette, Indiana	17–14	Weins (3–2)	Nowicki (0–1)	Hildebrand (2)	1,044	19–5	1–3
25	April 6	Indiana State	Alexander Field • West Lafayette, Indiana	6–10	Hurth (4–1)	Stephen (2–3)	None	1,107	19–6	1–3
26	April 9	Indiana	Alexander Field • West Lafayette, Indiana	17–0	Smeltz (5–0)	Perkins (2–2)	None	1,874	20–6	2–3
27	April 10	Indiana	Alexander Field • West Lafayette, Indiana	3–10	Holderfield (2–1)	Wansing (2–1)	Tucker (2)	2,367	20–7	2–4
28	April 10	Indiana	Alexander Field • West Lafayette, Indiana	16–15	Hildebrand (2–0)	Sharp (0–5)	Lohman (2)	2,367	21–7	3–4
	April 12	Purdue Fort Wayne	Alexander Field • West Lafayette, Indiana	Game cancelled						
29	April 14	at Penn State	Medlar Field • University Park, Pennsylvania	7–12	Miller (2–2)	Castro (1–1)	Shingledecker (1)	508	21–8	3–5
30	April 15	at Penn State	Medlar Field • University Park, Pennsylvania	11–5	Smeltz (6–0)	Tulio (2–2)	None	756	22–8	4–5
31	April 16	at Penn State	Medlar Field • University Park, Pennsylvania	5–7	Luensmann (2–2)	Wansing (2–2)	Mellott (2)	551	22–9	4–6
32	April 19	at UIC	Les Miller Field at Curtis Granderson Stadium • Chicago, Illinois	6–9	Zack (1–1)	Hildebrand (2–1)	Shears (6)	158	22–10	4–6
	April 20	Evansville	Alexander Field • West Lafayette, Indiana	Game cancelled						
33	April 22	Belmont	Alexander Field • West Lafayette, Indiana	2–3	Bean (7–1)	Smeltz (6–1)	Brennan (12)	1,648	22–11	4–6
34	April 23	Belmont	Alexander Field • West Lafayette, Indiana	1–11	South (5–2)	Wansing (2–3)	None	1,689	22–12	4–6
35	April 24	Belmont	Alexander Field • West Lafayette, Indiana	6–8	Borders (4–2)	Wendell (3–2)	Brennan (13)	1,369	22–13	4–6
36	April 26	Valparaiso	Alexander Field • West Lafayette, Indiana	6–5	Wansing (3–3)	Nowak (0–2)	None	1,464	23–13	4–6
37	April 29	Michigan	Alexander Field • West Lafayette, Indiana	18–4	Backer (2–0)	O'Halloran (4–3)	None	1,881	24–13	5–6

May (5–6)

#	Date	Opponent	Site/stadium	Score	Win	Loss	Save	Attendance	Overall record	B1G record
38	May 1	Michigan	Alexander Field • West Lafayette, Indiana	12–4	Wendell (4–2)	Weston (4–3)	Weins (2)	2,202	25–13	6–6
39	May 1	Michigan	Alexander Field • West Lafayette, Indiana	2–13	Allen (6–0)	Wansing (3–4)	None	2,202	25–14	6–7
40	May 6	at Iowa	Duane Banks Field • Iowa City, Iowa	2–5	Mazur (6–2)	Backer (2–1)	Buetel (3)	826	25–15	6–8
41	May 7	at Iowa	Duane Banks Field • Iowa City, Iowa	10–6	Wendell (5–2)	Schultz (2–2)	None	1,734	26–15	7–8
42	May 8	at Iowa	Duane Banks Field • Iowa City, Iowa	1–9	Langenberg (5–1)	Danzeisen (1–1)	None	1,082	26–16	7–9
43	May 10	Butler	Alexander Field • West Lafayette, Indiana	11–6	Castro (2–1)	MacCauley (3–3)	None	1,904	27–16	7–9
44	May 13	at Northwestern	Rocky Miller Park • Evanston, Illinois	14–8	Stephen (3–3)	Sullivan (5–2)	None	673	28–16	8–9
45	May 14	at Northwestern	Rocky Miller Park • Evanston, Illinois	1–11	Farinelli (5–5)	Wendell (5–3)	None	609	28–17	8–10
46	May 15	at Northwestern	Rocky Miller Park • Evanston, Illinois	7–2	Wansing (4–4)	Comstock (0–4)	Weins (3)	608	29–17	9–10
47	May 19	No. 15 Maryland	Alexander Field • West Lafayette, Indiana	7–14	Savacool (8–2)	Backer (2–2)	None	1,690	29–18	9–11
48	May 20	No. 15 Maryland	Alexander Field • West Lafayette, Indiana	7–18	Dean (6–2)	Stephen (3–4)	None	1,420	29–19	9–12
–	May 21	No. 15 Maryland	Alexander Field • West Lafayette, Indiana	Game cancelled						

Postseason
Big Ten Conference Tournament (0–2)

#	Date	Opponent	Site/stadium	Score	Win	Loss	Save	Attendance	Overall record	B1G record
49	May 26	vs Rutgers	Charles Schwab Field Omaha • Omaha, Nebraska	3–10	Stanavich (1–3)	Weins (3–3)	None	–	29–20	9–12
50	May 27	vs Iowa	Charles Schwab Field Omaha • Omaha, Nebraska	4–5	Christophersen (1–2)	Weins (3–4)	None	–	29–21	9–12

== Rankings ==
Ranking movements Legend: ██ Increase in ranking ██ Decrease in ranking — = Not ranked RV = Received votes
	Week																		
Poll	Pre	1	2	3	4	5	6	7	8	9	10	11	12	13	14	15	16	17	Final
Coaches'	—	—*	RV	RV	RV	RV	RV	RV	—	—	—	—	—	—	—	—	—	—	—
Baseball America	—	—	—	—	—	—	—	—	—	—	—	—	—	—	—	—	—	—	—
Collegiate Baseball^	—	—	—	21	19	17	16	—	—	—	—	—	—	—	—	—	—	—	—
NCBWA†	—	—	RV	RV	RV	RV	29	RV	—	—	—	—	—	—	—	—	—	—	—
D1Baseball	—	—	—	—	—	—	—	—	—	—	—	—	—	—	—	—	—	—	—

^ Collegiate Baseball ranked 40 teams in their preseason poll, but only ranked 30 teams weekly during the season.
† NCBWA ranks 30 teams in their preseason poll, but only ranks 25 teams weekly during the season.
* A new poll was not released for this week, so for comparison purposes, the previous week's ranking is inserted in this week's slot.

== Awards ==
=== Big Ten Conference Players of the Week ===
Weekly Awards
Player	Award	Date Awarded	Ref.
Troy Wansing	Freshman of the Week	March 23, 2022	
Jackson Smeltz	Pitcher of the Week	April 14, 2022	

=== Conference awards ===
Awards
Player	Award	Date Awarded	Ref.
C. J. Valdez	First Team All-Big Ten	May 24, 2022	
Jackson Smeltz	Third Team All-Big Ten	May 24, 2022	
Troy Wansing	Freshman Team All-Big Ten	May 24, 2022	
