= 2022 Michigan Wolverines baseball team =

American college baseball season

2022 Michigan Wolverines baseball

Big Ten tournament champions

NCAA Louisville Regional, 2–2
- Conference: Big Ten Conference
- Record: 34-28 (12-12 Big Ten)
- Head coach: Erik Bakich (10th season)
- Assistant coaches: Nick Schnabel (10th season); Brandon Inge (2nd season)
- Pitching coach: Steve Merriman (2nd season)
- Home stadium: Wilpon Baseball Complex

2022 Big Ten Conference baseball standings
	Conf.				Overall
Team	W		L	PCT	W		L	PCT
No. 12 Maryland ‍†‍‍^{y}	18	–	5	.783	48	–	13	.787
Rutgers ‍‍‍	17	–	7	.708	44	–	15	.746
Iowa ‍‍‍	17	–	7	.708	36	–	19	.655
Illinois ‍‍‍	17	–	7	.708	31	–	22	.585
Michigan ‍‍‡‍^{y}	12	–	12	.500	34	–	28	.548
Penn State ‍‍‍	11	–	13	.458	26	–	29	.473
Purdue ‍‍‍	9	–	12	.429	29	–	21	.580
Indiana ‍‍‍	10	–	14	.417	27	–	32	.458
Northwestern ‍‍‍	10	–	14	.417	24	–	27	.471
Nebraska ‍‍‍	10	–	14	.417	23	–	30	.434
Ohio State ‍‍‍	8	–	14	.364	21	–	30	.412
Michigan State ‍‍‍	8	–	16	.333	24	–	30	.444
Minnesota ‍‍‍	6	–	18	.250	16	–	36	.308
† – Conference champion ‡ – Tournament champion y – Invited to the NCAA tournament As of June 6, 2022; Rankings from D1Baseball

The 2022 Michigan Wolverines baseball team represented the University of Michigan in the 2022 NCAA Division I baseball season. The Wolverines, led by head coach Erik Bakich in his tenth season, are a member of the Big Ten Conference and played their home games at Wilpon Baseball Complex in Ann Arbor, Michigan. The Wolverines won the 2022 Big Ten baseball tournament and qualified for the NCAA tournament.

== Previous season ==
The Wolverines finished the 2021 season 27–19, including 27–17 in conference play, finishing in third place in their conference. Following the conclusion of the regular season, the Wolverines received an at-large bid to the 2021 NCAA Division I baseball tournament, where they lost to UConn and Central Michigan in the NCAA Regional.

== Preseason ==
For the 2022 Big Ten Conference poll, Michigan was voted to finish in second by the Big Ten Coaches.

Michigan was ranked No. 30 in the preseason poll by Collegiate Baseball.

== Roster ==
2022 Michigan Wolverines baseball team
Players
Coaches

#	Pos.	Name	B/T	Height	Weight	Year	Previous school	Home town
0	INF	Dan Blomgren	R/R	5 ft 10 in (1.78 m)	165 lb (75 kg)	So	Craig	Milton, Wisconsin
2	INF	Camden Gasser	L/R	5 ft 10 in (1.78 m)	160 lb (73 kg)	Fr	Southridge	Huntingburg, Indiana
3	INF	Ted Burton	R/R	6 ft 2 in (1.88 m)	170 lb (77 kg)	Jr	Edison	Huntington Beach, California
4	INF	Brandon Lawrence	S/R	5 ft 10 in (1.78 m)	195 lb (88 kg)	So	Dunn	Santa Ynez, California
5	OF	Joe Stewart	R/R	6 ft 4 in (1.93 m)	207 lb (94 kg)	RS Sr	Portage Central	Portage, Michigan
6	RHP	Alex Fedje-Johnson	R/R	6 ft 0 in (1.83 m)	190 lb (86 kg)	RS Sr	Minnehaha Academy	Minneapolis, Minnesota
7	OF	Jake Marti	S/R	6 ft 4 in (1.93 m)	200 lb (91 kg)	Jr	Normal West	Bloomington, Illinois
8	INF	Jimmy Obertop	R/R	6 ft 1 in (1.85 m)	220 lb (100 kg)	Jr	Westminster Christian Academy	St. Louis, Missouri
9	INF	Dylan Stanton	R/R	6 ft 1 in (1.85 m)	190 lb (86 kg)	RS So	Gull Lake	Richland, Michigan
10	INF	Cody Hultink	R/R	6 ft 0 in (1.83 m)	175 lb (79 kg)	Fr	Pennfield	Battle Creek, Michigan
12	INF	Riley Bertram	S/R	6 ft 0 in (1.83 m)	180 lb (82 kg)	Sr	Zionsville	Zionsville, Indiana
13	C	Joe Longo	R/R	6 ft 0 in (1.83 m)	215 lb (98 kg)	Fr	Academy of Holy Angels	Apple Valley, Minnesota
14	RHP	Avery Goldensoph	R/R	6 ft 6 in (1.98 m)	175 lb (79 kg)	RS Fr	Swan Valley	Saginaw, Michigan
15	INF	Clark Elliott	L/R	5 ft 10 in (1.78 m)	170 lb (77 kg)	Jr	Barrington	Barrington, Illinois
17	INF	Joe Taylor	L/R	5 ft 9 in (1.75 m)	185 lb (84 kg)	Fr	Chelsea	Chelsea, Michigan
18	C	Jordan Rodgers	R/R	5 ft 8 in (1.73 m)	175 lb (79 kg)	RS Jr	Simeon Career Academy	Chicago, Illinois
19	LHP	Logan Wood	L/L	6 ft 2 in (1.88 m)	180 lb (82 kg)	So	OLSM Prep	Macomb, Michigan
20	RHP	Willie Weiss	R/R	6 ft 3 in (1.91 m)	225 lb (102 kg)	Sr	Westview	Portland, Oregon
21	RHP	John Torroella	R/R	6 ft 4 in (1.93 m)	205 lb (93 kg)	RS Jr	Mount Saint Joseph	Ellicott City, Maryland
22	INF	Tito Flores	R/R	6 ft 0 in (1.83 m)	190 lb (86 kg)	Jr	Brother Rice	Detroit, Michigan
24	INF	Matt Frey	L/R	6 ft 0 in (1.83 m)	200 lb (91 kg)	RS Sr	Franklin Regional	Murrysville, Pennsylvania
26	OF	Joey Velazquez	L/L	6 ft 0 in (1.83 m)	230 lb (104 kg)	Jr	St. Francis DeSales	Lewis Center, Ohio
27	LHP	Jaylen Jones	R/L	6 ft 0 in (1.83 m)	220 lb (100 kg)	Fr	TNXL Academy	Thomasville, Georgia
28	RHP	Keaton Carratini	R/R	6 ft 2 in (1.88 m)	200 lb (91 kg)	Sr	La Costa Canyon	Encinitas, California
29	RHP	Brayden Lybarger	R/R	6 ft 6 in (1.98 m)	170 lb (77 kg)	Fr	Elida	Lima, Ohio
30	LHP	Jack White	L/L	6 ft 3 in (1.91 m)	210 lb (95 kg)	Sr	Athens Academy	Bethesda, Maryland
32	RHP	Tyler Fullman	R/R	6 ft 1 in (1.85 m)	220 lb (100 kg)	Fr	Marian Catholic	Homewood, Illinois
34	RHP	Ahmad Harajli	R/R	6 ft 4 in (1.93 m)	240 lb (109 kg)	So	IMG Academy	Dearborn, Michigan
35	LHP	Walker Cleveland	L/L	6 ft 2 in (1.88 m)	175 lb (79 kg)	Sr	North Gwinnett	Suwanee, Georgia
36	INF	Trevor Kilinski	L/R	6 ft 1 in (1.85 m)	200 lb (91 kg)	So	Zeeland West	Zeeland, Michigan
37	RHP	Chase Allen	R/R	6 ft 6 in (1.98 m)	220 lb (100 kg)	So	Regis Jesuit	Littleton, Colorado
39	LHP	Cononr O'Halloran	R/L	6 ft 2 in (1.88 m)	190 lb (86 kg)	So	St. Martin	Mississauga, Ontario
40	LHP	Angelo Smith	L/L	5 ft 9 in (1.75 m)	175 lb (79 kg)	RS Sr	Richards	Thornton, Illinois
47	LHP	Jacob Denner	L/L	6 ft 0 in (1.83 m)	195 lb (88 kg)	Jr	Bergen Catholic	Closter, New Jersey
48	RHP	Noah Rennard	R/R	6 ft 3 in (1.91 m)	205 lb (93 kg)	Jr	Maria Carrillo	Santa Rosa, California
49	OF	Ian Kennedy	R/R	6 ft 3 in (1.91 m)	230 lb (104 kg)	So	Whitefield Academy	Douglasville, Georgia
50	C	Casey Buckley	L/R	6 ft 1 in (1.85 m)	195 lb (88 kg)	Sr	Los Alamitos	Long Beach, California
51	INF	Jack Van Remortel	R/R	6 ft 2 in (1.88 m)	215 lb (98 kg)	Sr	Carmel	Carmel, Indiana
54	RHP	Ryan Zimmer	R/R	6 ft 5 in (1.96 m)	230 lb (104 kg)	So	St. Clair High School	St. Clair, Michigan
55	RHP	Cameron Weston	R/R	6 ft 2 in (1.88 m)	215 lb (98 kg)	Jr	Canon-McMillan	Canonsburg, Pennsylvania

Head coach

Erik Bakich

Assistant coach(es)

Nick Schnabel
Brandon Inge

Pitching coach(es)

Steve Merriman

Legend

- (C) Team captain
- (S) Suspended
- (I) Ineligible
- Injured
- Current redshirt

Roster
Last update: December 1, 2021

== Schedule and results ==
2022 Michigan Wolverines baseball game log
Regular season (28–25)

February (5–2)
#	Date	Opponent	Rank	Site/stadium	Score	Win	Loss	Save	Attendance	Overall Record	B1G Record
1	February 18	vs. No. 14 Texas Tech		Globe Life Field; Arlington, TX	6–7	Hampton (1–0)	**Weiss** (0–1)	—	7,112	0–1	–
2	February 19	vs. Kansas State		Globe Life Field	10–2	**Denner** (1–0)	Griffin (0–1)	—	—	1–1	–
3	February 20	vs. Oklahoma		Globe Life Field	1–6	Atwood (1–0)	**O'Halloran** (0–1)	—	8,006	1–2	–
4	February 21	at UT Arlington		Clay Gould Ballpark; Arlington, TX	9–7	**Allen** (1–0)	King (0–2)	**Harajli** (1)	575	2–2	–
5	February 25	vs. Seton Hall		Infinity Insurance Park; Miami, FL	8–2	**Weston** (1–0)	Shine (0–1)	**Rennard** (1)	400	3–2	–
6	February 26	at FIU		Infinity Insurance Park	16–8	**Allen** (2–0)	Martin (0–1)	—	802	4–2	–
7	February 27	at FIU		Infinity Insurance Park	13–9	**Cleveland** (1–0)	Eckaus (0–1)	**Weiss** (1)	422	5–2	–

March (8–9)
#	Date	Opponent	Rank	Site/stadium	Score	Win	Loss	Save	Attendance	Overall Record	B1G Record
8	March 1	at Florida Atlantic		FAU Baseball Stadium; Boca Raton, FL	8–9	Wegielnik (1–0)	**Wood** (0–1)	—	698	5–3	–
9	March 2	at Florida Atlantic		FAU Baseball Stadium	20–13	**Smith** (1–0)	Martzolf (0–1)	—	557	6–3	–
10	March 4	vs. No. 21 Maryland		Clark–LeClair Stadium; Greenville, NC	7–4	**Rennard** (1–0)	Heine (0–1)	**Weiss** (2)	—	7–3	–
11	March 5	vs. East Carolina		Clark–LeClair Stadium	8–10	Grosz (2–0)	**O'Halloran** (0–2)	Logusch (1)	4,259	7–4	–
12	March 6	vs. Indiana State		Clark–LeClair Stadium	5–6	Patzner (1–0)	**Denner** (1–1)	Fenlong (3)	—	7–5	–
13	March 11	at Louisville		Jim Patterson Stadium; Louisville, KY	3–5	Kuehner (3–0)	**Weston** (1–1)	Prosecky (4)	—	7–6	–
—	March 11	at Louisville		Jim Patterson Stadium	Suspended (inclement weather). Continuation held on March 13.^{[a]}						
14	March 13	at Louisville		Jim Patterson Stadium	16–7	**O'Halloran** (1–2)	Koger (0–1)	—	1,021	8–6	–
15	March 13	at Louisville		Jim Patterson Stadium	1–13	Phillips (2–0)	**Denner** (1–2)	—	703	8–7	–
16	March 15	at No. 4 Vanderbilt		Hawkins Field; Nashville, TN	4–5	Schultz (1–1)	**Weiss** (0–2)	—	3,802	8–8	–
17	March 17	Dayton		Ray Fisher Stadium; Ann Arbor, MI	2–1	**O'Halloran** (2–2)	Steinhauer (1–1)	**Allen** (1)	654	9–8	–
18	March 18	Dayton		Ray Fisher Stadium	18–6	**Rennard** (2–0)	Peguero (0–1)	—	457	10–8	–
19	March 20	Dayton		Ray Fisher Stadium	4–2	**Denner** (2–2)	Serwa (1–4)	**Allen** (2)	1,241	11–8	–
20	March 23	at Xavier		J. Page Hayden Field; Cincinnati, OH	2–8	Bell (1–0)	**Walker** (1–1)	—	518	11–9	–
21	March 25	at Nebraska		Hawks Field; Lincoln, NE	9–13	Koty (2–0)	**Rennard** (2–1)	—	5,109	11–10	0–1
22	March 26	at Nebraska		Hawks Field	8–6	**Allen** (3–0)	Bragg (1–2)	—	6,561	12–10	1–1
23	March 27	at Nebraska		Hawks Field	6–1	**Denner** (3–2)	McCarville (2–3)	**Rennard** (2)	5,075	13–10	2–1
24	March 30	Oakland		Ray Fisher Stadium	7–14	Decker (2–1)	**Wood** (0–2)	—	347	13–11	–

April (9–6)
#	Date	Opponent	Rank	Site/stadium	Score	Win	Loss	Save	Attendance	Overall Record	B1G Record
—	April 1	Iowa		Ray Fisher Stadium	Postponed (inclement weather)						
25	April 2	Iowa		Ray Fisher Stadium	2–8	Nedved (2–2)	**Weston** (1–2)	—	1,200	13–12	2–2
26	April 2	Iowa		Ray Fisher Stadium	2–0	**O'Halloran** (3–2)	Mazur (2–2)	**Allen** (3)	1,605	14–12	3–2
27	April 3	Iowa		Ray Fisher Stadium	3–10	Langenberg (4–0)	**Denner** (4–2)	—	1,008	14–13	3–3
28	April 6	Purdue Fort Wayne		Ray Fisher Stadium	3–6	Myer (1–4)	**Cleveland** (1–2)	Miller (1)	579	14–14	–
29	April 8	Cal State Fullerton		Ray Fisher Stadium	2–1	**Allen** (4–0)	Stultz (2–2)	—	742	15–14	–
30	April 9	Cal State Fullerton		Ray Fisher Stadium	8–2	**Weston** (2–2)	Yates (2–1)	**Rennard** (3)	1,255	16–14	–
31	April 10	Cal State Fullerton		Ray Fisher Stadium	11–10	**Rennard** (3–1)	Weisberg (1–2)	—	1,785	17–14	–
32	April 12	at No. 10 Notre Dame		Frank Eck Stadium; South Bend, IN	5–14	Dennies (1–0)	Cleveland (1–3)	—	854	17–15	–
33	April 15	at Michigan State		Drayton McLane Baseball Stadium; East Lansing, MI	18–6	**O'Halloran** (4–2)	Dunning (1–4)	—	4,242	18–15	4–3
34	April 16	at Michigan State		Drayton McLane Baseball Stadium	8–2	**Weston** (3–2)	Powers (2–4)	—	2,333	19–15	5–3
35	April 17	at Michigan State		Drayton McLane Baseball Stadium	6–3	**Allen** (5–0)	Tomasic (2–1)	**Denner** (1)	503	20–15	6–3
36	April 22	Ohio State		Ray Fisher Stadium	9–8 ^{(10)}	**Rennard** (4–1)	Karaffa (1–1)	—	1,002	21–15	7–3
37	April 23	Ohio State		Ray Fisher Stadium	16–13	**Weston** (4–2)	Coupet (2–4)	**Denner** (2)	2,750	22–15	8–3
38	April 24	Ohio State		Ray Fisher Stadium	5–6	Brock (1–2)	**Denner** (4–3)	—	2,279	22–16	8–4
39	April 29	at Purdue		Alexander Field; West Lafayette, IN	4–18	Backer (2–0)	**O'Halloran** (4–3)	—	1,881	22–17	8–5
—	April 30	at Purdue		Alexander Field	Postponed (inclement weather)						

May (6–8)
#	Date	Opponent	Rank	Site/stadium	Score	Win	Loss	Save	Attendance	Overall Record	B1G Record
40	May 1	at Purdue		Alexander Field	4–12	Wendell (4–2)	**Weston** (4–3)	—	2,202	22–18	8–6
41	May 1	at Purdue		Alexander Field	13–2	**Allen** (6–0)	Wansing (6–7)	—	2,202	23–18	9–6
42	May 3	Youngstown State		Ray Fisher Stadium	Cancelled						
43	May 6	Indiana		Ray Fisher Stadium	8–4	**Weiss** (1–2)	Holderfield (2–4)	**Rennard** (3)	1,434	24–18	10–6
44	May 7	Indiana		Ray Fisher Stadium	5–9	Bothwell (2–1)	**Smith** (1–1)	Sharp (3)	1,813	24–19	10–7
45	May 8	Indiana		Ray Fisher Stadium	8–10	Sharp (3–6)	**Rennard** (4–2)	—	1,354	24–20	10–8
46	May 10	Xavier		Ray Fisher Stadium	3–10	Olson (2–3)	**Denner** (3–5)	—	1,004	24–21	–
47	May 11	Wright State		Ray Fisher Stadium	21–9	**Keaser** (1–0)	Wirsing (1–5)	—	1,174	25–21	–
48	May 13	at No. 17 Maryland		Shipley Field; College Park, MD	7–8	Falco (6–1)	**O'Halloran** (4–4)	Belgrave (3)	1,478	25–22	10–9
49	May 14	at No. 17 Maryland		Shipley Field	6–20	Ramsey (10–0)	**Denner** (3–6)	—	1,478	25–23	10–10
50	May 15	at No. 17 Maryland		Shipley Field	10–15	Dean (5–2)	**Allen** (6–1)	—	2,075	25–24	10–11
51	May 17	Michigan State		Ray Fisher Stadium	11–8	**Goldensoph** (2–2)	Arbaugh (1–1)	**Weiss** (3)	1,734	26–24	–
52	May 19	Rutgers		Ray Fisher Stadium	9–6	**Rennard** (5–2)	Bello (4–2)	**Weston** (1)	1,004	27–24	11–11
53	May 20	Rutgers		Ray Fisher Stadium	9–7	**Weiss** (2–2)	Stanavich (0–3)	**Weston** (2)	1,411	28–24	12–11
54	May 21	Rutgers		Ray Fisher Stadium	12–18	Bello (5–2)	**Smith** (1–2)	—	1,928	28–25	12–12

Postseason (6–3)

B1G Tournament (4–1)
#	Date	Opponent	Rank	Stadium Site	Score	Win	Loss	Save	Attendance	Overall Record	B1GT Record
55	May 26	vs. (4) Illinois	(5)	Charles Schwab Field Omaha; Omaha, NE	7–5	**Allen** (7–1)	Glassey (2–2)	**Weston** (3)	—	29–25	1–0
56	May 27	vs. (1) No. 10 Maryland	(5)	Charles Schwab Field Omaha	15–8	**Weiss** (3–2)	Ramsey (10–1)	—	—	30–25	2–0
57	May 28	vs. (3) Iowa	(5)	Charles Schwab Field Omaha	3–7	Baumann (1–0)	**Allen** (7–2)	Schultz (1)	—	30–26	2–1
58	May 29	vs. (3) Iowa	(5)	Charles Schwab Field Omaha	13–1 ^{(7)}	**O'Halloran** (5–4)	Brecht (1–4)	**Weston** (4)	—	31–26	3–1
59	May 29	vs. (2) Rutgers	(5)	Charles Schwab Field Omaha	10–4	**Denner** (4–6)	Portnoy (3–1)	—	—	32–26	4–1

Louisville Regional (2–2)
#	Date	Opponent	Rank	Stadium Site	Score	Win	Loss	Save	Attendance	Overall Record	Regional Record
60	June 3	vs. (2) Oregon	(3)	Jim Patterson Stadium	8–6	**Weston** (5–3)	Britton (4–1)	—	2,338	33–26	1–0
61	June 4	vs. (1) No. 8 Louisville	(3)	Jim Patterson Stadium	7–3	**Rennard** (6–2)	Poland (5–5)	—	3,547	34–26	2–0
62	June 5	vs. (1) No. 8 Louisville	(3)	Jim Patterson Stadium	1–20	Phillips (5–1)	**Smith** (1–3)	Webster (1)	2,775	34–27	2–1
63	June 6	vs. (1) No. 8 Louisville	(3)	Jim Patterson Stadium	9–11	Kuehner (7–3)	**Weston** (5–4)	Prosecky (11)	3,655	34–28	2–2

- Win
- Loss
- Postponement
- Bold: Wolverines team member
- Rankings from D1Baseball.com.
- (#) Tournament seedings in parentheses.

Notes:

- **^{a}** The March 11 game at Louisville was suspended due to snow in the top of the fifth inning with the score 13–4 in favor of the Wolverines. It was completed on March 13 prior to the regularly scheduled game that afternoon.

== Rankings ==
Ranking movements Legend: ██ Increase in ranking ██ Decrease in ranking — = Not ranked RV = Received votes
	Week																		
Poll	Pre	1	2	3	4	5	6	7	8	9	10	11	12	13	14	15	16	17	Final
Coaches'	RV	RV*	RV	—	—	—	—	—	—	—	—	—	—	—	—	RV	RV		RV
Baseball America	—	—	—	—	—	—	—	—	—	—	—	—	—	—	—	—			—
Collegiate Baseball^	30	—	—	—	—	—	—	—	—	—	—	—	—	—	—	—	—	—	—
NCBWA†	RV	—	—	RV	—	RV	RV	—	—	—	—	—	—	—	—	RV			RV
D1Baseball	—	—	—	—	—	—	—	—	—	—	—	—	—	—	—	—			—

^ Collegiate Baseball ranked 40 teams in their preseason poll, but only ranked 30 teams weekly during the season.
† NCBWA ranks 30 teams in their preseason poll, but only ranks 25 teams weekly during the season.
* A new poll was not released for this week, so for comparison purposes, the previous week's ranking is inserted in this week's slot.

== Awards and honors ==
All-Big Ten
Player	Selection	Ref.
Clark Elliott	First Team	
Matt Frey	Third Team	
Joe Stewart	Third Team	

== Major League Baseball draft ==
The following Wolverines were selected in the 2022 Major League Baseball draft:

List of Drafted Players
Name	2022 Class	Pos.	Team	Overall
Clark Elliott	Junior	OF	Oakland Athletics	69th
Cameron Weston	Junior	RHP	Baltimore Orioles	227th
Joe Stewart	Graduate Student	OF	Los Angeles Angels	268th
