= 2022 Nebraska Cornhuskers baseball team =

American college baseball season

2022 Nebraska Cornhuskers baseball
- Conference: Big Ten Conference
- Record: 23–30 (10–14 Big Ten)
- Head coach: Will Bolt (3rd season)
- Assistant coach: Danny Marcuzzo (3rd season)
- Hitting coach: Lance Harvell (3rd season)
- Pitching coach: Jeff Christy (3rd season)
- Home stadium: Haymarket Park

2022 Big Ten Conference baseball standings
| | Conf. | | | | Overall |
| Team | W | | L | PCT | W | | L | PCT |
|---|---|---|---|---|---|---|---|---|
| No. 12 Maryland ‍†‍‍^{y} | 18 | – | 5 | .783 | 48 | – | 13 | .787 |
| Rutgers ‍‍‍ | 17 | – | 7 | .708 | 44 | – | 15 | .746 |
| Iowa ‍‍‍ | 17 | – | 7 | .708 | 36 | – | 19 | .655 |
| Illinois ‍‍‍ | 17 | – | 7 | .708 | 31 | – | 22 | .585 |
| Michigan ‍‍‡‍^{y} | 12 | – | 12 | .500 | 34 | – | 28 | .548 |
| Penn State ‍‍‍ | 11 | – | 13 | .458 | 26 | – | 29 | .473 |
| Purdue ‍‍‍ | 9 | – | 12 | .429 | 29 | – | 21 | .580 |
| Indiana ‍‍‍ | 10 | – | 14 | .417 | 27 | – | 32 | .458 |
| Northwestern ‍‍‍ | 10 | – | 14 | .417 | 24 | – | 27 | .471 |
| Nebraska ‍‍‍ | 10 | – | 14 | .417 | 23 | – | 30 | .434 |
| Ohio State ‍‍‍ | 8 | – | 14 | .364 | 21 | – | 30 | .412 |
| Michigan State ‍‍‍ | 8 | – | 16 | .333 | 24 | – | 30 | .444 |
| Minnesota ‍‍‍ | 6 | – | 18 | .250 | 16 | – | 36 | .308 |
† – Conference champion ‡ – Tournament champion y – Invited to the NCAA tournament As of June 6, 2022; Rankings from D1Baseball

The Nebraska Cornhuskers baseball team was a baseball team that represented the University of Nebraska–Lincoln in the 2022 NCAA Division I baseball season. The Cornhuskers were members of the Big Ten Conference and played their home games at Haymarket Park in Lincoln, Nebraska. They were led by third-year head coach Will Bolt.

== Previous season ==
The Cornhuskers finished the 2021 NCAA Division I baseball season 31–12 overall (31–12 conference) and first place in conference standings, as the season was limited to only conference games for all Big Ten teams due to the COVID-19 pandemic.

== Preseason ==
For the 2022 Big Ten Conference poll, Nebraska was voted to finish in first by the Big Ten Coaches.

== Roster ==
2022 Nebraska Cornhuskers baseball team
Players
Coaches

| # | Pos. | Name | B/T | Height | Weight | Year | Previous school | Home town |
|---|---|---|---|---|---|---|---|---|
| 1 | OF | Luke Jessen | L/L | 5 ft 9 in (1.75 m) | 170 lb (77 kg) | Fr | Elkhorn South H.S. | Elkhorn, Nebraska |
| 3 | INF | Max Petersen | L/R | 6 ft 1 in (1.85 m) | 180 lb (82 kg) | Fr | Lincoln Southwest H.S. | Lincoln, Nebraska |
| 4 | INF | Max Anderson | R/R | 6 ft 0 in (1.83 m) | 195 lb (88 kg) | So | Millard West H.S. | Omaha, Nebraska |
| 5 | UTL | Josh Caron | R/R | 6 ft 0 in (1.83 m) | 215 lb (98 kg) | Fr | Sun Prairie H.S. | Sun Prairie, Wisconsin |
| 8 | RHP | Shay Schanaman | R/R | 6 ft 0 in (1.83 m) | 195 lb (88 kg) | Sr | Grand Island Senior H.S. | Grand Island, Nebraska |
| 9 | INF | Efry Cervantes | R/R | 6 ft 1 in (1.85 m) | 185 lb (84 kg) | Sr | South Mountain C.C. | Tucson, Arizona |
| 10 | UTL | Leighton Banjoff | R/R | 6 ft 1 in (1.85 m) | 200 lb (91 kg) | Sr | Elyria Catholic H.S. | Sheffield, Ohio |
| 11 | INF | Jack Steil | R/R | 6 ft 2 in (1.88 m) | 215 lb (98 kg) | So | Rocori H.S. | Cold Spring, Minnesota |
| 12 | RHP | Braxton Bragg | R/R | 6 ft 2 in (1.88 m) | 200 lb (91 kg) | Jr | Liberty H.S. | Kansas City, Missouri |
| 13 | UTL | Cam Chick | S/R | 5 ft 9 in (1.75 m) | 175 lb (79 kg) | Sr | Hickman H.S. | Columbia, Missouri |
| 14 | INF | Brice Matthews | R/R | 6 ft 0 in (1.83 m) | 175 lb (79 kg) | So | Atascocita H.S. | Humble, Texas |
| 16 | C | Griffin Everitt | R/R | 6 ft 0 in (1.83 m) | 210 lb (95 kg) | Sr | Kansas City Kansas C.C. | Lincoln, Nebraska |
| 17 | OF | Tyler Palmer | R/R | 6 ft 1 in (1.85 m) | 175 lb (79 kg) | RS Fr | Scotus Central Catholic H.S. | Columbus, Nebraska |
| 18 | OF | Grant Anglim | R/R | 6 ft 0 in (1.83 m) | 190 lb (86 kg) | RS Fr | Papillion-La Vista H.S. | La Vista, Nebraska |
| 19 | LHP | Kyle Perry | L/L | 6 ft 0 in (1.83 m) | 190 lb (86 kg) | Sr | Millard South H.S. | Omaha, Nebraska |
| 20 | INF | Core Jackson | L/R | 6 ft 0 in (1.83 m) | 185 lb (84 kg) | Fr | Central Catholic | Wyoming, Ontario |
| 21 | OF | Luke Sartori | R/R | 6 ft 0 in (1.83 m) | 190 lb (86 kg) | Jr | Hutchinson C.C. | Lincoln, Nebraska |
| 25 | RHP | Drew Christo | L/R | 6 ft 4 in (1.93 m) | 230 lb (104 kg) | Fr | Elkhorn H.S. | Elkhorn, Nebraska |
| 26 | C | Drew Wessell | R/R | 6 ft 0 in (1.83 m) | 180 lb (82 kg) | RS Fr | Millard South H.S. | Omaha, Nebraska |
| 27 | LHP | Jake Bunz | L/L | 6 ft 5 in (1.96 m) | 240 lb (109 kg) | Sr | Hutchinson C.C. | Elkhorn, Nebraska |
| 28 | RHP | Koy Frank | R/R | 6 ft 2 in (1.88 m) | 210 lb (95 kg) | Sr | Eastern Oklahoma State College | Tushka, Oklahoma |
| 30 | UTL | Will Walsh | R/L | 6 ft 4 in (1.93 m) | 230 lb (104 kg) | RS Fr | Rockhurst H.S | Leawood, Kansas |
| 32 | RHP | C. J. Hood | R/R | 6 ft 4 in (1.93 m) | 195 lb (88 kg) | Fr | Norris H.S. | Hickman, Nebraska |
| 33 | LHP | Jackson Brockett | L/L | 6 ft 1 in (1.85 m) | 190 lb (86 kg) | Fr | Buford H.S. | Omaha, Nebraska |
| 34 | RHP | Colby Gomes | R/R | 6 ft 5 in (1.96 m) | 225 lb (102 kg) | Jr | Millard West H.S. | Omaha, Nebraska |
| 35 | RHP | Quinn Mason | R/R | 6 ft 3 in (1.91 m) | 220 lb (100 kg) | Jr | Gretna H.S. | Gretna, Nebraska |
| 37 | LHP | Chandler Benson | L/L | 5 ft 11 in (1.8 m) | 160 lb (73 kg) | Fr | Liberty H.S. | Frisco, Texas |
| 38 | LHP | Emmett Olson | L/L | 6 ft 4 in (1.93 m) | 230 lb (104 kg) | So | Maine West H.S. | Des Plaines, Illinois |
| 39 | RHP | Corbin Hawkins | R/R | 6 ft 2 in (1.88 m) | 200 lb (91 kg) | Fr | Millard West H.S. | Omaha, Nebraska |
| 40 | LHP | Caleb Feekin | L/L | 6 ft 3 in (1.91 m) | 200 lb (91 kg) | Jr | Papillion-La Vista H.S. | Papillion, Nebraska |
| 41 | LHP | Tyler Martin | L/L | 6 ft 2 in (1.88 m) | 185 lb (84 kg) | Sr | Webb City H.S. | Webb City, Missouri |
| 43 | RHP | Jaxon Jelkin | R/R | 6 ft 4 in (1.93 m) | 180 lb (82 kg) | Fr | Bellevue West H.S. | Bellevue, Nebraska |
| 44 | INF | Gabe Swansen | R/R | 5 ft 11 in (1.8 m) | 190 lb (86 kg) | Fr | Johnston H.S. | Johnston, Iowa |
| 45 | UTL | Matthew Guthmiller | L/L | 6 ft 1 in (1.85 m) | 190 lb (86 kg) | Fr | Millard South H.S. | Omaha, Nebraska |
| 47 | C | Nick Wimmers | S/R | 6 ft 3 in (1.91 m) | 205 lb (93 kg) | Jr | Eastern Oklahoma State College | Oregonia, Ohio |
| 48 | LHP | Ethan Bradford | L/L | 6 ft 3 in (1.91 m) | 195 lb (88 kg) | Jr | Free State H.S. | Lawrence, Kansas |
| 49 | RHP | Dawson McCarville | R/R | 6 ft 3 in (1.91 m) | 215 lb (98 kg) | Sr | Sandra Day O'Connor H.S. | Glendale, Arizona |
| 51 | RHP | Mason Ornelas | R/R | 6 ft 0 in (1.83 m) | 210 lb (95 kg) | Jr | L. D. Bell H.S. | Fort Worth, Texas |

Head coach

Will Bolt

Assistant coach(es)

Hitting coach(es)

Lance Harvell

Base coach(es)

Danny Marcuzzo

Pitching coach(es)

Jeff Christy

Legend

- (C) Team captain
- (S) Suspended
- (I) Ineligible
- Injured
- Current redshirt

Roster
Last update: February 15, 2022

== Schedule ==
2022 Nebraska Cornhuskers baseball game log
Regular season
February (1–6)

| # | Date | Opponent | Site/stadium | Score | Win | Loss | Save | Attendance | Overall record | B1G record |
|---|---|---|---|---|---|---|---|---|---|---|
| 1 | February 18 | at Sam Houston State | Don Sanders Stadium • Huntsville, Texas | 5–8 | Wesneski (1–0) | Olson (0–1) | Lusk (1) | 423 | 0–1 | – |
| 2 | February 19 | at Sam Houston State | Don Sanders Stadium • Huntsville, Texas | 1–5 | Atkinson (1–0) | Schanaman (0–1) | None | 1,488 | 0–2 | – |
| 3 | February 19 | at Sam Houston State | Don Sanders Stadium • Huntsville, Texas | 12–9 | Ornelas (1–0) | Rudis (0–1) | None | 1,488 | 1–2 | – |
| 4 | February 20 | at Sam Houston State | Don Sanders Stadium • Huntsville, Texas | 3–6 | Beard (1–0) | Bragg (0–1) | Lusk (2) | 1,255 | 1–3 | – |
| 5 | February 25 | vs #17 TCU | Globe Life Field • Arlington, Texas | 1–4 | Krob (1–0) | Perry (0–1) | Ridings (2) | 4,912 | 1–4 | – |
| 6 | February 26 | vs #17 TCU | Globe Life Field • Arlington, Texas | 3–8 | Cornelio (1–0) | Schanaman (0–2) | Bolden (1) | 5,476 | 1–5 | – |
| 7 | February 27 | vs #17 TCU | Globe Life Field • Arlington, Texas | 3–5 | Walker (2–0) | McCarville (0–1) | Ridings (3) | – | 1–6 | – |

March (8–8)

| # | Date | Opponent | Site/stadium | Score | Win | Loss | Save | Attendance | Overall record | B1G record |
|---|---|---|---|---|---|---|---|---|---|---|
| 8 | March 4 | vs Northwestern State | Clay Gould Ballpark • Arlington, Texas | 2–0 | Frank (1–0) | Carver (0–2) | Olson (1) | 200 | 2–6 | – |
| 9 | March 4 | at UT Arlington | Clay Gould Ballpark • Arlington, Texas | 3–4 | Peters (1–0) | Gomes (0–1) | None | 720 | 2–7 | – |
| 10 | March 5 | vs Northwestern State | Clay Gould Ballpark • Arlington, Texas | 6–0 | Schanaman (1–2) | Harmon (1–1) | None | 311 | 3–7 | – |
| 11 | March 5 | at UT Arlington | Clay Gould Ballpark • Arlington, Texas | 8–2 | McCarville (1–1) | Moffat (0–3) | None | 766 | 4–7 | – |
| 12 | March 8 | at Kansas State | Tointon Family Stadium • Manhattan, Kansas | 4–6 | Hassall (1–2) | Olson (0–2) | Rothermel (1) | – | 4–8 | – |
| – | March 11 | Long Beach State | Haymarket Park • Lincoln, Nebraska | Game cancelled | | | | | | |
| – | March 12 | Long Beach State | Haymarket Park • Lincoln, Nebraska | Game cancelled | | | | | | |
| – | March 13 | Long Beach State | Haymarket Park • Lincoln, Nebraska | Game cancelled | | | | | | |
| 13 | March 15 | at Omaha | Tal Anderson Field • Omaha, Nebraska | 3–4 | Machado (2–1) | Perry (0–2) | None | 3,009 | 4–9 | – |
| 14 | March 16 | Omaha | Haymarket Park • Lincoln, Nebraska | 6–5 | Bragg (1–1) | Howe (0–3) | None | 1,466 | 5–9 | – |
| 15 | March 15 | New Mexico State | Haymarket Park • Lincoln, Nebraska | 12–6 | McCarville (2–1) | Blazek (1–2) | None | 4,901 | 6–9 | – |
| 16 | March 16 | New Mexico State | Haymarket Park • Lincoln, Nebraska | 6–5 | Olson (1–2) | Rodriguez (0–2) | None | 5,043 | 7–9 | – |
| 17 | March 18 | Texas A&M–Corpus Christi | Haymarket Park • Lincoln, Nebraska | 13–12 | Ornelas (2–0) | Nelson (0–1) | None | 4,407 | 8–9 | – |
| 18 | March 19 | Texas A&M–Corpus Christi | Haymarket Park • Lincoln, Nebraska | 1–4 | Thomas (3–1) | Schanaman (1–3) | Garcia (2) | 5,446 | 8–10 | – |
| 19 | March 20 | Texas A&M–Corpus Christi | Haymarket Park • Lincoln, Nebraska | 4–21 | Perez (2–1) | McCarville (2–2) | None | 5,627 | 8–11 | – |
| – | March 23 | South Dakota State | Haymarket Park • Lincoln, Nebraska | Game cancelled | | | | | | |
| 20 | March 25 | Michigan | Haymarket Park • Lincoln, Nebraska | 13–9 | Koty (2–0) | Rennard (2–1) | None | 5,109 | 9–11 | 1–0 |
| 21 | March 26 | Michigan | Haymarket Park • Lincoln, Nebraska | 6–8 | Allen (3–0) | Bragg (1–2) | None | 6,561 | 9–12 | 1–1 |
| 22 | March 27 | Michigan | Haymarket Park • Lincoln, Nebraska | 1–6 | Denner (3–2) | McCarville (2–3) | Rennard (2) | 5,075 | 9–13 | 1–2 |
| 23 | March 29 | at Creighton | Charles Schwab Field Omaha • Omaha, Nebraska | 2–3 | Vetock (1–0) | Jelkin (0–1) | Steier (3) | 3,110 | 9–14 | 1–2 |

April (8–10)

| # | Date | Opponent | Site/stadium | Score | Win | Loss | Save | Attendance | Overall record | B1G record |
|---|---|---|---|---|---|---|---|---|---|---|
| 24 | April 1 | at Ohio State | Bill Davis Stadium • Columbus, Ohio | 5–3 | Schanaman (2–3) | Coupet (2–3) | Bragg (2) | 1,370 | 10–14 | 2–2 |
| 25 | April 2 | at Ohio State | Bill Davis Stadium • Columbus, Ohio | 10–5 | Martin (1–0) | Haberthier (0–3) | None | 1,118 | 11–14 | 3–2 |
| 26 | April 3 | at Ohio State | Bill Davis Stadium • Columbus, Ohio | 17–5 | Jelkin (1–1) | Loncar (1–3) | None | 1,079 | 12–14 | 4–2 |
| 27 | April 6 | at Omaha | Tal Anderson Field • Omaha, Nebraska | 5–6 | Machado (4–1) | Christo (0–1) | Kreiling (1) | 1,585 | 12–15 | 4–2 |
| 28 | April 8 | Rutgers | Haymarket Park • Lincoln, Nebraska | 5–7 | Kollar (6–0) | Schanaman (2–4) | None | 5,053 | 12–16 | 4–3 |
| 29 | April 9 | Rutgers | Haymarket Park • Lincoln, Nebraska | 4–5 | French (2–0) | Bragg (1–3) | Stanavich (7) | 5,852 | 12–17 | 4–4 |
| 30 | April 10 | Rutgers | Haymarket Park • Lincoln, Nebraska | 1–19 | Sinibaldi (2–0) | McCarville (2–4) | None | 5,282 | 12–18 | 4–5 |
| – | April 12 | Creighton | Haymarket Park • Lincoln, Nebraska | Game cancelled | | | | | | |
| 31 | April 14 | BYU | Haymarket Park • Lincoln, Nebraska | 1–0 | Martin (2–0) | Sterner (3–2) | Bragg (3) | 4,382 | 13–18 | 4–5 |
| 32 | April 15 | BYU | Haymarket Park • Lincoln, Nebraska | 2–3 | Nielson (2–0) | Schanaman (2–5) | MaLaughlin (6) | 5,219 | 13–19 | 4–5 |
| 33 | April 15 | BYU | Haymarket Park • Lincoln, Nebraska | 6–7 | Smith (1–0) | Bragg (1–4) | Dahle (1) | 5,219 | 13–20 | 4–5 |
| 34 | April 16 | BYU | Haymarket Park • Lincoln, Nebraska | 3–4 | McKeehan (1–0) | Hawkins (0–1) | McLaughlin (7) | 5,005 | 13–21 | 4–5 |
| 35 | April 20 | North Dakota State | Haymarket Park • Lincoln, Nebraska | 4–3 | Hood (1–0) | Smith (0–2) | Bragg (4) | 4,462 | 14–21 | 4–5 |
| 36 | April 22 | at Indiana | Bart Kaufman Field • Bloomington, Indiana | 7–8 | Perkins (3–2) | Schanaman (2–6) | Tucker (4) | 1,655 | 14–22 | 4–6 |
| 37 | April 23 | at Indiana | Bart Kaufman Field • Bloomington, Indiana | 1–8 | Brehmer (4–2) | Olson (1–3) | Sharp (1) | 1,751 | 14–23 | 4–7 |
| 38 | April 24 | at Indiana | Bart Kaufman Field • Bloomington, Indiana | 19–7 | Frank (3–0) | Holderfield (2–3) | None | 1,973 | 15–23 | 5–7 |
| 39 | April 26 | Kansas State | Haymarket Park • Lincoln, Nebraska | 8–6 | Hood (2–0) | Ruhl (2–2) | Bragg (5) | 5,353 | 16–23 | 5–7 |
| 40 | April 27 | Omaha | Haymarket Park • Lincoln, Nebraska | 14–3 | McCarville (3–4) | Sellers (3–1) | None | 4,867 | 17–23 | 5–7 |
| 41 | April 29 | Iowa | Haymarket Park • Lincoln, Nebraska | 0–1 | Mazur (5–3) | Schanaman (2–7) | None | 4,835 | 17–24 | 5–8 |

May (6–6)

| # | Date | Opponent | Site/stadium | Score | Win | Loss | Save | Attendance | Overall record | B1G record |
|---|---|---|---|---|---|---|---|---|---|---|
| 42 | May 1 | Iowa | Haymarket Park • Lincoln, Nebraska | 12–1 | Olson (2–3) | Schultz (2–1) | None | 5,741 | 18–24 | 6–8 |
| 43 | May 1 | Iowa | Haymarket Park • Lincoln, Nebraska | 3–5 | Nedved (5–2) | Bragg (1–5) | Beutel (2) | 5,741 | 18–25 | 6–9 |
| 44 | May 6 | at Minnesota | Siebert Field • Minneapolis, Minnesota | 12–5 | Frank (4–0) | Ireland (4–5) | None | 606 | 19–25 | 7–9 |
| 45 | May 7 | at Minnesota | Siebert Field • Minneapolis, Minnesota | 8–9 | Culliver (1–1) | Bragg (1–6) | None | 1,272 | 19–26 | 7–10 |
| 46 | May 8 | at Minnesota | Siebert Field • Minneapolis, Minnesota | 1–3 | Maldonado (2–3) | McCarville (3–5) | Liffrig (1) | 504 | 19–27 | 7–11 |
| 47 | May 13 | at Illinois | Illinois Field • Champaign, Illinois | 3–8 | Kirschsieper (7–2) | Schanaman (2–8) | None | 3,089 | 19–28 | 7–12 |
| 48 | May 14 | at Illinois | Illinois Field • Champaign, Illinois | 11–2 | Olson (3–3) | Gowens (5–3) | None | 789 | 20–28 | 8–12 |
| 49 | May 15 | at Illinois | Illinois Field • Champaign, Illinois | 4–5 | Green (2–2) | Hawkins (0–2) | None | 802 | 20–29 | 8–13 |
| 50 | May 17 | Oral Roberts | Haymarket Park • Lincoln, Nebraska | 9–5 | 'McCarville (4–5) | Archambo (5–2) | Ornelas (1) | 4,480 | 21–29 | 8–13 |
| 51 | May 19 | Michigan State | Haymarket Park • Lincoln, Nebraska | 1–4 | Tomasic (4–4) | Brockett (0–1) | Bischoff (12) | 4,993 | 21–30 | 8–14 |
| 52 | May 20 | Michigan State | Haymarket Park • Lincoln, Nebraska | 6–3 | Frank (5–0) | Rush (3–3) | None | 5,602 | 22–30 | 9–14 |
| 53 | May 21 | Michigan State | Haymarket Park • Lincoln, Nebraska | 10–9 | Bragg (2–6) | Szczepaniak (4–3) | Hood (1) | 5,900 | 23–30 | 10–14 |

== Rankings ==
Ranking movements Legend: ██ Increase in ranking ██ Decrease in ranking — = Not ranked RV = Received votes
| | Week | | | | | | | | | | | | | | | | | | |
| Poll | Pre | 1 | 2 | 3 | 4 | 5 | 6 | 7 | 8 | 9 | 10 | 11 | 12 | 13 | 14 | 15 | 16 | 17 | Final |
|---|---|---|---|---|---|---|---|---|---|---|---|---|---|---|---|---|---|---|---|
| Coaches' | RV | RV* | — | — | — | — | — | — | — | — | — | — | — | — | — | — | — | — | — |
| Baseball America | 20 | — | — | — | — | — | — | — | — | — | — | — | — | — | — | — | — | — | — |
| Collegiate Baseball^ | 31 | — | — | — | — | — | — | — | — | — | — | — | — | — | — | — | — | — | — |
| NCBWA† | 25 | RV | — | — | — | — | — | — | — | — | — | — | — | — | — | — | — | — | — |
| D1Baseball | — | — | — | — | — | — | — | — | — | — | — | — | — | — | — | — | — | — | — |

^ Collegiate Baseball ranked 40 teams in their preseason poll, but only ranked 30 teams weekly during the season.
† NCBWA ranks 30 teams in their preseason poll, but only ranks 25 teams weekly during the season.
* A new poll was not released for this week, so for comparison purposes, the previous week's ranking is inserted in this week's slot.

== Awards ==
=== Big Ten Conference Players of the Week ===
Weekly Awards
| Player | Award | Date Awarded | Ref. |
|---|---|---|---|
| Shay Schanaman | Pitcher of the Week | March 9, 2022 | |
| Griffin Everitt | Co-Player of the Week | March 23, 2022 | |
| Garrett Anglim | Freshman of the Week | March 29, 2022 | |
| Koty Frank | Pitcher of the Week | April 19, 2022 | |

=== Conference awards ===
Awards
| Player | Award | Date Awarded | Ref. |
|---|---|---|---|
| Emmett Olson | Second team All-Big Ten | May 24, 2022 | |
| Garrett Anglim | Freshman team All-Big Ten | May 24, 2022 | |
