= 2022 Maryland Terrapins baseball team =

American college baseball season

2022 Maryland Terrapins baseball

Big Ten regular season champions

NCAA College Park Regional, 3–2
- Conference: Big Ten Conference

Ranking
- Coaches: No. 8
- CB: No. 21
- Record: 48–14 (18–5 Big Ten)
- Head coach: Rob Vaughn (5th season)
- Assistant coach: Anthony Papio (5th season)
- Hitting coach: Matt Swope (5th season)
- Pitching coach: Mike Morrison (1st season)
- Home stadium: Bob "Turtle" Smith Stadium

2022 Big Ten Conference baseball standings
	Conf.				Overall
Team	W		L	PCT	W		L	PCT
No. 12 Maryland ‍†‍‍^{y}	18	–	5	.783	48	–	13	.787
Rutgers ‍‍‍	17	–	7	.708	44	–	15	.746
Iowa ‍‍‍	17	–	7	.708	36	–	19	.655
Illinois ‍‍‍	17	–	7	.708	31	–	22	.585
Michigan ‍‍‡‍^{y}	12	–	12	.500	34	–	28	.548
Penn State ‍‍‍	11	–	13	.458	26	–	29	.473
Purdue ‍‍‍	9	–	12	.429	29	–	21	.580
Indiana ‍‍‍	10	–	14	.417	27	–	32	.458
Northwestern ‍‍‍	10	–	14	.417	24	–	27	.471
Nebraska ‍‍‍	10	–	14	.417	23	–	30	.434
Ohio State ‍‍‍	8	–	14	.364	21	–	30	.412
Michigan State ‍‍‍	8	–	16	.333	24	–	30	.444
Minnesota ‍‍‍	6	–	18	.250	16	–	36	.308
† – Conference champion ‡ – Tournament champion y – Invited to the NCAA tournament As of June 6, 2022; Rankings from D1Baseball

The Maryland Terrapins baseball team was a baseball team that represented the University of Maryland, College Park in the 2022 NCAA Division I baseball season. The Terrapins were members of the Big Ten Conference and played their home games at Bob "Turtle" Smith Stadium in College Park, Maryland. They were led by fifth-year head coach Rob Vaughn.

Maryland won their first regular season conference title in 51 years, and the Big Ten regular season title for the first time ever.

== Previous season ==
The Terrapins finished the 2021 NCAA Division I baseball season 30–18 overall (28–16 conference) and second place in conference standings, as the season was limited to only conference games for all Big Ten teams due to the COVID-19 pandemic. Following the conclusion of the regular season, the Terrapins were selected to play in the 2021 NCAA tournament, beginning in the Greenville Regional. The Terrapins would eventually lose in the second round of the Greenville Regional to East Carolina by a score of 9–6.

== Preseason ==
Pitching coach Corey Muscara left the team to become the pitching coach of the Wake Forest. The Terrapins promoted Anthony Papio from volunteer assistant to full-time assistant. They then hired Mike Morrison to complete their coaching staff.

For the 2022 Big Ten Conference poll, Maryland was voted to finish in fourth by the Big Ten Coaches.

== Roster ==
2022 Maryland Terrapins baseball team
Players
Coaches

#	Pos.	Name	B/T	Height	Weight	Year	Previous school	Home town
1	INF	Jacob Orr	/	5 ft 9 in (1.75 m)	170 lb (77 kg)	Fr	Thomas Johnson H.S.	Frederick, Maryland
3	OF	Chris Alleyne	/	5 ft 9 in (1.75 m)	190 lb (86 kg)	RS Sr	Chestnut Hill Academy	Philadelphia, Pennsylvania
4	INF	Maxwell Costes	/	6 ft 1 in (1.85 m)	215 lb (98 kg)	Sr	Gilman School	Baltimore, Maryland
5	LHP	Andrew Johnson	/L	6 ft 0 in (1.83 m)	200 lb (91 kg)	Fr	Glenelg H.S.	Mount Airy, Maryland
6	INF	Matt Shaw	/	5 ft 11 in (1.8 m)	185 lb (84 kg)	So	Worcester Academy	Brimfield, Massachusetts
8	INF	Kevin Keister	/	5 ft 9 in (1.75 m)	180 lb (82 kg)	So	Caravel Academy	Smyrna, Delaware
9	C	Riley Langerman	/	6 ft 1 in (1.85 m)	175 lb (79 kg)	Jr	Ventura College	Parker, Colorado
10	RHP	Will Glock	/R	5 ft 11 in (1.8 m)	190 lb (86 kg)	RS Jr	Loyola Blakefield	Fallston, Maryland
12	RHP	Matt Cunningham	/R	6 ft 3 in (1.91 m)	180 lb (82 kg)	Fr	Linganore H. S.	Mount Airy, Maryland
13	INF	Matt Orlando	/	6 ft 0 in (1.83 m)	180 lb (82 kg)	Jr	Los Osos H. S.	Marlton, New Jersey
14	OF	Tony Schreffler Jr.	/	6 ft 1 in (1.85 m)	190 lb (86 kg)	Jr	Central Dauphin H. S.	Harrisburg, Pennsylvania
15	OF	Zach Martin	/	6 ft 0 in (1.83 m)	185 lb (84 kg)	Fr	Middletown H. S.	Middletown, Maryland
16	INF	Drew Grace	/R	6 ft 0 in (1.83 m)	185 lb (84 kg)	Jr	Blue Mountain H.S.	Orwigsburg, Pennsylvania
17	RHP	Noah Mrotek	/R	6 ft 2 in (1.88 m)	200 lb (91 kg)	Fr	Archbishop Spalding H. S.	Bowie, Maryland
18	C	Steve Thomas	/	6 ft 0 in (1.83 m)	195 lb (88 kg)	Fr	Unionville H. S.	Unionville, Pennsylvania
22	RHP	Sean Heine	/R	6 ft 4 in (1.93 m)	210 lb (95 kg)	Sr	Shawnee H. S.	Medford, New Jersey
23	OF	Ian Petrutz	/	6 ft 0 in (1.83 m)	190 lb (86 kg)	Fr	Eustace Preparatory School	Mantua Township, New Jersey
27	C	Luke Shliger	/	5 ft 9 in (1.75 m)	180 lb (82 kg)	So	Trinity-Pawling School	Danbury, Connecticut
28	RHP	David Falco	/R	6 ft 4 in (1.93 m)	235 lb (107 kg)	RS So	Center Moriches H.S.	Center Moriches, New York
29	LHP	Michael Walsh	/L	6 ft 1 in (1.85 m)	180 lb (82 kg)	Fr	Riverside H. S.	Leesburg, Virginia
30	INF	Sean Lane	/	6 ft 4 in (1.93 m)	235 lb (107 kg)	Fr	St. Dominic H. S.	Long Island, New York
31	RHP	Nick Robinson	/R	6 ft 5 in (1.96 m)	210 lb (95 kg)	RS Sr	Holy Trinity H. S.	Hewlett, New York
32	LHP	Ryan Ramsey	/L	6 ft 0 in (1.83 m)	195 lb (88 kg)	Jr	Pascack Hills H. S.	Montvale, New Jersey
33	LHP	Travis Garnett	/L	6 ft 6 in (1.98 m)	230 lb (104 kg)	Fr	Indian Creek School	Pasadena, Maryland
34	INF	Nick Lorusso	/	6 ft 2 in (1.88 m)	215 lb (98 kg)	Jr	Masuk H. S.	Monroe, Connecticut
35	RHP	Ryan Van Buren	/R	6 ft 3 in (1.91 m)	180 lb (82 kg)	Fr	Abington H. S.	Abington, Pennsylvania
37		Logan Ott	/L	5 ft 11 in (1.8 m)	190 lb (86 kg)	So	Montoursville Area H. S.	Montoursville, Pennsylvania
38	C	James Heffley	/	5 ft 11 in (1.8 m)	170 lb (77 kg)	RS So	Albert Einstein H. S.	Kensington, Maryland
39	RHP	Gavin Stellpflug	/R	6 ft 6 in (1.98 m)	210 lb (95 kg)	So	Somerville H. S.	Whitehouse Station, New Jersey
40	INF	Michael Bouma	/	6 ft 1 in (1.85 m)	210 lb (95 kg)	Jr	Sherwood H. S.	Brookeville, Maryland
41	OF	Bobby Zmarzlak	/	6 ft 5 in (1.96 m)	205 lb (93 kg)	Jr	Westhill H. S.	Stamford, Connecticut
42	RHP	Nick Dean	/R	6 ft 3 in (1.91 m)	180 lb (82 kg)	Jr	Bensalem H. S.	Bensalem, Pennsylvania
44	RHP	Nigel Belgrave	/R	6 ft 4 in (1.93 m)	195 lb (88 kg)	So	Auburn H. S.	Auburn, Massachusetts
45	RHP	Jason Savacool	/R	6 ft 1 in (1.85 m)	210 lb (95 kg)	So	Charles W. Baker H. S.	Baldwinsville, New York

Head coach

Rob Vaughn

Assistant coach(es)

Hitting coach(es)

Matt Swope

Base coach(es)

Anthony Papio

Pitching coach(es)

Mike Morrison

Legend

- (C) Team captain
- (S) Suspended
- (I) Ineligible
- Injured
- Current redshirt

Roster

== Schedule ==
2022 Maryland Terrapins baseball game log
Regular season (44–10)
February (7–0)

#	Date	Rank	Opponent	Site/stadium	Score	Win	Loss	Save	Attendance	Overall record	B1G record
1	February 18		at Baylor	Baylor Ballpark • Waco, Texas	4–0	Dean (1–0)	Thomas (0–1)	None	1,704	1–0	–
2	February 19		at Baylor	Baylor Ballpark • Waco, Texas	9–5	Ramsey (1–0)	Helton (0–1)	None	2,138	2–0	–
3	February 20		at Baylor	Baylor Ballpark • Waco, Texas	8–4	Savacool (1–0)	Jackson (0–1)	None	2,097	3–0	–
4	February 23	22	UMBC	Bob "Turtle" Smith Stadium • College Park, Maryland	3–2	Mrotek (1–0)	Leffler (0–1)	None	1,072	4–0	–
5	February 25	22	at Campbell	Jim Perry Stadium • Buies Creek, North Carolina	4–0	Dean (2–0)	Harrington (0–1)	Heine (1)	623	5–0	–
6	February 26	22	at Campbell	Jim Perry Stadium • Buies Creek, North Carolina	3–1	Ramsey (2–0)	Kuehler (0–2)	Belgrave (1)	690	6–0	–
7	February 26	22	at Campbell	Jim Perry Stadium • Buies Creek, North Carolina	9–2	Savacool (2–0)	Beymer (0–1)	None	690	7–0	–

March (13–5)

#	Date	Rank	Opponent	Site/stadium	Score	Win	Loss	Save	Attendance	Overall record	B1G record
8	March 1	21	Delaware	Bob "Turtle" Smith Stadium • College Park, Maryland	14–4	Glock (1–0)	Velazquez (0–1)	None	842	8–0	–
9	March 4	21	vs Michigan	Clark–LeClair Stadium • Greenville, North Carolina	4–7	Rennard (1–0)	Heine (0–1)	Weiss (2)	–	8–1	–
10	March 5	21	vs Indiana State	Clark–LeClair Stadium • Greenville, North Carolina	12–6	Ramsey (3–0)	Parisi (1–2)	Van Buren (1)	–	9–1	–
11	March 6	21	at East Carolina	Clark–LeClair Stadium • Greenville, North Carolina	3–6	Beal (1–0)	Savacool (2–1)	Giles (1)	3,863	9–2	–
12	March 8	24	VCU	Bob "Turtle" Smith Stadium • College Park, Maryland	8–6	Orlando (1–0)	Serrano (0–1)	Glock (1)	627	10–2	–
–	March 9	24	at VCU	The Diamond • Richmond, Virginia	Game cancelled						
13	March 11	24	Georgetown	Bob "Turtle" Smith Stadium • College Park, Maryland	10–9	Lorusso (1–0)	Tonas (0–1)	None	1,208	11–2	–
14	March 13	24	Cornell	Bob "Turtle" Smith Stadium • College Park, Maryland	12–5	Ramsey (4–0)	Edwards (1–2)	None	425	12–2	–
15	March 14	24	at Georgetown	Shirley Povich Field • Washington, D.C.	5–1	Savacool (3–1)	Salley (2–1)	None	753	13–3	–
16	March 15	24	at Delaware	Bob Hannah Stadium • Newark, Delaware	3–6	Pizzico (1–0)	Lorusso (1–1)	Biasiello (2)	254	13–3	–
17	March 19	24	Siena	Bob "Turtle" Smith Stadium • College Park, Maryland	14–9	Heine (1–1)	Marynczak (0–1)	None	1,091	14–3	–
18	March 19	24	Siena	Bob "Turtle" Smith Stadium • College Park, Maryland	7–0	Ramsey (5–0)	Seiler (1–3)	None	1,091	15–3	–
19	March 20	24	Siena	Bob "Turtle" Smith Stadium • College Park, Maryland	19–2	Savacool (4–1)	Rozakis (0–2)	None	618	16–3	–
20	March 22	22	at UMBC	The Baseball Factory Field at UMBC • Catonsville, Maryland	13–7	Van Buren (1–0)	Gorman (0–1)	None	387	17–3	–
21	March 25	22	at Dallas Baptist	Horner Ballpark • Dallas, Texas	3–8	Meador (5–0)	Dean (2–1)	None	1,378	17–4	–
22	March 26	22	at Dallas Baptist	Horner Ballpark • Dallas, Texas	11–5	Ramsey (6–0)	Eldred (3–1)	None	863	18–4	–
23	March 27	22	at Dallas Baptist	Horner Ballpark • Dallas, Texas	2–5	Hall (2–1)	Savacool (4–2)	Arnold (4)	1,050	18–5	–
24	March 29		Towson	Bob "Turtle" Smith Stadium • College Park, Maryland	26–8	Johnson (1–0)	Pecko (0–1)	None	543	19–5	–
25	March 30		at George Mason	Spuhler Field • Fairfax, Virginia	3–1	Ott (1–0)	Yount (0–3)	Heine (2)	115	20–5	–

April (14–4)

#	Date	Rank	Opponent	Site/stadium	Score	Win	Loss	Save	Attendance	Overall record	B1G record
26	April 1		Penn State	Bob "Turtle" Smith Stadium • College Park, Maryland	8–4	Mrotek (2–0)	Mellott (1–3)	None	1,029	21–5	1–0
27	April 2		Penn State	Bob "Turtle" Smith Stadium • College Park, Maryland	4–6	Luensmann (1–2)	Robinson (0–1)	None	1,807	21–6	1–1
28	April 3		Penn State	Bob "Turtle" Smith Stadium • College Park, Maryland	7–2	Savacool (5–2)	Molsky (0–4)	None	1,308	22–6	2–1
29	April 5		George Mason	Bob "Turtle" Smith Stadium • College Park, Maryland	8–5	Van Buren (2–0)	Barrett (0–2)	Heine (3)	389	23–6	2–1
30	April 8		at Minnesota	Siebert Field • Minneapolis, Minnesota	11–7	Dean (3–1)	Ireland (3–2)	None	219	24–6	3–1
31	April 9		at Minnesota	Siebert Field • Minneapolis, Minnesota	5–4	Ramsey (7–0)	Massey (2–4)	Falco (1)	719	25–6	4–1
32	April 10		at Minnesota	Siebert Field • Minneapolis, Minnesota	3–4	DeLuga (1–0)	Van Buren (2–1)	Skoro (1)	387	25–7	4–2
33	April 13		at James Madison	Eagle Field at Veterans Memorial Park • Harrisonburg, Virginia	8–7	Falco (1–0)	Vogatsky (2–4)	None	774	26–7	4–2
34	April 15		Ohio State	Bob "Turtle" Smith Stadium • College Park, Maryland	8–6	Falco (2–0)	Hammerberg (2–3)	None	1,254	27–7	5–2
35	April 16		Ohio State	Bob "Turtle" Smith Stadium • College Park, Maryland	6–5	Belgrave (1–0)	Loncar (1–4)	None	1,461	28–7	6–2
36	April 17		Ohio State	Bob "Turtle" Smith Stadium • College Park, Maryland	16–1	Savacool (6–2)	Gehring (0–2)	None	1,081	29–7	7–2
37	April 19	24	at Towson	John B. Schuerholz Baseball Complex • Towson, Maryland	4–3	Falco (3–0)	Marose (1–1)	None	184	30–7	7–2
38	April 22	24	at Illinois	Illinois Field • Champaign, Illinois	1–19	Kirschsieper (5–2)	Dean (3–2)	None	737	30–8	7–3
39	April 23	24	at Illinois	Illinois Field • Champaign, Illinois	13–9	Falco (4–0)	Green (1–2)	None	495	31–8	8–3
40	April 23	24	at Illinois	Illinois Field • Champaign, Illinois	7–4	Savacool (7–2)	Gowens (4–2)	Belgrave (2)	1,042	32–8	9–3
41	April 26	23	Navy	Bob "Turtle" Smith Stadium • College Park, Maryland	18–10	Heine (2–1)	Smith (1–1)	None	512	33–8	9–3
42	April 29	23	Northwestern	Bob "Turtle" Smith Stadium • College Park, Maryland	13–0	Ramsey (8–0)	Sullivan (5–1)	None	1,270	34–8	10–3
43	April 30	23	Northwestern	Bob "Turtle" Smith Stadium • College Park, Maryland	4–7	Moe (3–3)	Falco (4–1)	Doherty (1)	2,576	34–9	10–4

May (10–1)

#	Date	Rank	Opponent	Site/stadium	Score	Win	Loss	Save	Attendance	Overall record	B1G record
44	May 1	23	Northwestern	Bob "Turtle" Smith Stadium • College Park, Maryland	10–5	Falco (5–1)	Hanks (2–1)	None	568	35–9	11–4
45	May 3	18	Georgetown	Bob "Turtle" Smith Stadium • College Park, Maryland	19–1	Mrotek (3–0)	Keough (2–1)	None	831	36–9	11–4
46	May 8	18	at Rutgers	Bainton Field • Piscataway, New Jersey	16–8	Ramsey (9–0)	Kollar (7–2)	None	678	37–9	12–4
47	May 8	18	at Rutgers	Bainton Field • Piscataway, New Jersey	7–18	Gorski (5–0)	Mrotek (3–1)	None	678	37–10	12–5
48	May 9	22	at Rutgers	Bainton Field • Piscataway, New Jersey	9–4	Dean (4–2)	Bello (4–1)	Falco (2)	651	38–10	13–5
49	May 13	18	Michigan	Bob "Turtle" Smith Stadium • College Park, Maryland	8–7	Falco (6–1)	O'Halloran (4–4)	Belgrave (3)	1,478	39–10	14–5
50	May 14	18	Michigan	Bob "Turtle" Smith Stadium • College Park, Maryland	20–6	Ramsey (10–0)	Denner (3–6)	None	1,478	40–10	15–5
51	May 15	18	Michigan	Bob "Turtle" Smith Stadium • College Park, Maryland	15–10	Dean (5–2)	Allen (6–1)	None	2,075	41–10	16–5
52	May 17	15	James Madison	Bob "Turtle" Smith Stadium • College Park, Maryland	12-2	Ott (2-0)	Czerwinski (1-1)	None	1,272	42-10	16-5
53	May 19	15	at Purdue	Alexander Field • West Lafayette, Indiana	14–7	Savacool (8–2)	Backer (2–2)	None	1,690	43–10	17–5
54	May 20	15	at Purdue	Alexander Field • West Lafayette, Indiana	18–7	Dean (5–2)	Stephen (3–4)	None	1,420	44–10	18–5
–	May 21	15	at Purdue	Alexander Field • West Lafayette, Indiana	Game cancelled						

Postseason
Big Ten Conference Tournament (1–2)

#	Date	Rank	Opponent	Site/stadium	Score	Win	Loss	Save	Attendance	Overall record	B1G record
55	May 26	10	vs Indiana	Charles Schwab Field Omaha • Omaha, Nebraska	6–5	Belgrave (2–0)	Perkins (3–3)	None	–	45–10	18–5
56	May 27	10	vs Michigan	Charles Schwab Field Omaha • Omaha, Nebraska	4–5	Weiss (3–2)	Ramsey (10–1)	None	–	45–11	18–5
57	May 28	10	vs Indiana	Charles Schwab Field Omaha • Omaha, Nebraska	4–6	Tucker (2–3)	Walsh (0–1)	None	–	45–12	18–5

College Park Regional (3–2)

#	Date	Rank	Opponent	Site/stadium	Score	Win	Loss	Save	Attendance	Overall record	B1G record
58	June 3	12	LIU	Bob "Turtle" Smith Stadium • College Park, Maryland	6–5	Ramsey (11–1)	Loeschorn (11–3)	None	3,000	46–12	18–5
59	June 4	12	UConn	Bob "Turtle" Smith Stadium • College Park, Maryland	5–10	Gallagher (10–3)	Savacool (8–3)	Willis (14)	3,000	46–13	18–5
60	June 5	12	Wake Forest	Bob "Turtle" Smith Stadium • College Park, Maryland	10–5	Falco (7–1)	Golob (4–1)	None	2,179	47–13	18–5
61	June 5	12	UConn	Bob "Turtle" Smith Stadium • College Park, Maryland	7–6	Johnson (2–0)	Golob (4–1)	None	2,568	48–13	18–5
62	June 6	12	UConn	Bob "Turtle" Smith Stadium • College Park, Maryland	8–11	Peterson (11–2)	Johnson (2–1)	Willis (15)	3,000	48–14	18–5

== Rankings ==
Ranking movements Legend: ██ Increase in ranking ██ Decrease in ranking — = Not ranked RV = Received votes
	Week																		
Poll	Pre	1	2	3	4	5	6	7	8	9	10	11	12	13	14	15	16	17	Final
Coaches'	—	—*	21	23	22	20	23	23	24	21	23	17	17	14	8	8			
Baseball America	—	—	21	22	21	21	25	24	22	22	20	19	19	17	9	9			
Collegiate Baseball^	33	—	19	29	29	28	—	—	—	—	25	22	23	22	19	21			
NCBWA†	RV	25	20	25	22	22	26	23	22	19	21	15	14	20	11	7			
D1Baseball	—	22	21	24	24	22	—	—	—	24	23	18	18	15	10	12			

^ Collegiate Baseball ranked 40 teams in their preseason poll, but only ranked 30 teams weekly during the season.
† NCBWA ranks 30 teams in their preseason poll, but only ranks 25 teams weekly during the season.
* A new poll was not released for this week, so for comparison purposes, the previous week's ranking is inserted in this week's slot.

== Awards ==
=== Big Ten Conference Players of the Week ===
Weekly Awards
Player	Award	Date Awarded	Ref.
Matthew Shaw	Player of the Week	February 23, 2022	
Ryan Ramsey	Co-Pitcher of the Week	March 16, 2022	
Troy Schreffler	Co-Player of the Week	March 23, 2022	
Nick Lorusso	Player of the Week	April 5, 2022	
Bobby Zmarzlak	Player of the Week	April 19, 2022	
Ryan Ramsey	Pitcher of the Week	May 4, 2022	

=== Conference awards ===
Awards
Player	Award	Date Awarded	Ref.
Chris Alleyne	Big Ten Player of the Year	May 24, 2022	
Kevin Keister	First Team All-Big Ten	May 24, 2022	
Nick Lorusso	First Team All-Big Ten	May 24, 2022	
Chris Alleyne	First Team All-Big Ten	May 24, 2022	
Ryan Ramsey	First Team All-Big Ten	May 24, 2022	
Jason Savacool	First Team All-Big Ten	May 24, 2022	
Matt Shaw	First Team All-Big Ten	May 24, 2022	
Luke Shliger	Second Team All-Big Ten	May 24, 2022	
Troy Schreffler Jr.	Third Team All-Big Ten	May 24, 2022	
Nick Dean	Third Team All-Big Ten	May 24, 2022	
Maxwell Costes	Third Team All-Big Ten	May 24, 2022	
