= 2022 Big Ten baseball tournament =

- Teams: 8
- Format: Double-elimination
- Finals site: Charles Schwab Field Omaha; Omaha, Nebraska
- Champions: Michigan (10th title)
- Winning coach: Erik Bakich (2nd title)
- MVP: Clark Elliott (Michigan)
- Television: BTN

2022 Big Ten Conference baseball standings
	Conf.				Overall
Team	W		L	PCT	W		L	PCT
No. 12 Maryland ‍†‍‍^{y}	18	–	5	.783	48	–	13	.787
Rutgers ‍‍‍	17	–	7	.708	44	–	15	.746
Iowa ‍‍‍	17	–	7	.708	36	–	19	.655
Illinois ‍‍‍	17	–	7	.708	31	–	22	.585
Michigan ‍‍‡‍^{y}	12	–	12	.500	34	–	28	.548
Penn State ‍‍‍	11	–	13	.458	26	–	29	.473
Purdue ‍‍‍	9	–	12	.429	29	–	21	.580
Indiana ‍‍‍	10	–	14	.417	27	–	32	.458
Northwestern ‍‍‍	10	–	14	.417	24	–	27	.471
Nebraska ‍‍‍	10	–	14	.417	23	–	30	.434
Ohio State ‍‍‍	8	–	14	.364	21	–	30	.412
Michigan State ‍‍‍	8	–	16	.333	24	–	30	.444
Minnesota ‍‍‍	6	–	18	.250	16	–	36	.308
† – Conference champion ‡ – Tournament champion y – Invited to the NCAA tournament As of June 6, 2022; Rankings from D1Baseball

The 2022 Big Ten baseball tournament was held at Charles Schwab Field Omaha in Omaha, Nebraska, from May 26 through 29. As the tournament champion, Michigan earned the Big Ten Conference's automatic bid to the 2022 NCAA Division I baseball tournament. The tournament aired on the Big Ten Network. This was the first tournament since 2019 after the previous two tournaments were cancelled due to the COVID-19 pandemic.

== Format and seeding ==
The 2022 tournament was an eight team double-elimination tournament. The top eight teams based on conference regular season winning percentage earned invites to the tournament. The teams then played a double-elimination tournament leading to a single championship game.

== Bracket ==
First round
1	Maryland	6^{11}
8	Indiana	5
4	Illinois	5
5	Michigan	7
8	Indiana	8
4	Illinois	1
2	Rutgers	10
7	Purdue	3
3	Iowa	2
6	Penn State	5
7	Purdue	4
3	Iowa	5

Second round
1	Maryland	8
5	Michigan	15
8	Indiana	6^{11}
1	Maryland	4
2	Rutgers	5^{10}
6	Penn State	4
3	Iowa	11
6	Penn State	3

Semifinals
5	Michigan	3	13^{7}
3	Iowa	7	1
2	Rutgers	14^{7}	—
8	Indiana	2	—

Finals
5	Michigan	10
2	Rutgers	4

== Schedule ==
Game	Time*	Matchup^{#}	Score	Television
Thursday, May 26
1	9:00 a.m.	No. 3 Iowa vs. No. 6 Penn State	2–5	BTN
2	40 mins after Game 1	No. 2 Rutgers vs. No. 7 Purdue	10–3	BTN
3	40 mins after Game 2	No. 1 Maryland vs. No. 8 Indiana	6–5^{11}	BTN
4	40 mins after Game 3	No. 4 Illinois vs. No. 5 Michigan	5–7	BTN
Friday, May 27
5	9:00 a.m.	No. 3 Iowa vs. No. 7 Purdue	5–4	BTN
6	40 mins after Game 5	No. 6 Penn State vs. No. 2 Rutgers	4–5^{10}	BTN
7	40 mins after Game 6	No. 8 Indiana vs. No. 4 Illinois	8–1	BTN
8	40 mins after Game 7	No. 1 Maryland vs. No. 5 Michigan	8–15	BTN
Semifinals - Saturday, May 28
9	9:00 a.m.	No. 6 Penn State vs. No. 3 Iowa	3–11	BTN
10	1:50 p.m.	No. 1 Maryland vs. No. 8 Indiana	4–6^{11}	BTN
11	5:00 p.m.	No. 5 Michigan vs. No. 3 Iowa	3–7	BTN
12	9:00 p.m	No. 2 Rutgers vs. No. 8 Indiana	14–2^{7}	BTN
Championship – Sunday, May 29
13	1:00 p.m	No. 3 Iowa vs. No. 5 Michigan	1–13^{7}	BTN
14	5:00 p.m	No. 2 Rutgers vs. No. 5 Michigan	4–10	BTN
*Game times in CDT. # – Rankings denote tournament seed.
