= 2022 Northwestern Wildcats baseball team =

American college baseball season

2022 Northwestern Wildcats baseball
- Conference: Big Ten Conference
- Record: 24–27 (10–14 Big Ten)
- Head coach: Josh Reynolds (1st season)
- Assistant coach: Jimmy Frankos (1st season)
- Hitting coach: Dusty Napoleon (7th season)
- Pitching coach: Brad Hill (1st season)
- Home stadium: Rocky Miller Park

2022 Big Ten Conference baseball standings
	Conf.				Overall
Team	W		L	PCT	W		L	PCT
No. 12 Maryland ‍†‍‍^{y}	18	–	5	.783	48	–	13	.787
Rutgers ‍‍‍	17	–	7	.708	44	–	15	.746
Iowa ‍‍‍	17	–	7	.708	36	–	19	.655
Illinois ‍‍‍	17	–	7	.708	31	–	22	.585
Michigan ‍‍‡‍^{y}	12	–	12	.500	34	–	28	.548
Penn State ‍‍‍	11	–	13	.458	26	–	29	.473
Purdue ‍‍‍	9	–	12	.429	29	–	21	.580
Indiana ‍‍‍	10	–	14	.417	27	–	32	.458
Northwestern ‍‍‍	10	–	14	.417	24	–	27	.471
Nebraska ‍‍‍	10	–	14	.417	23	–	30	.434
Ohio State ‍‍‍	8	–	14	.364	21	–	30	.412
Michigan State ‍‍‍	8	–	16	.333	24	–	30	.444
Minnesota ‍‍‍	6	–	18	.250	16	–	36	.308
† – Conference champion ‡ – Tournament champion y – Invited to the NCAA tournament As of June 6, 2022; Rankings from D1Baseball

The Northwestern Wildcats baseball team was a baseball team that represented Northwestern University in the 2022 NCAA Division I baseball season. The Wildcats were members of the Big Ten Conference and played their home games at Rocky Miller Park in Evanston, Illinois. They were led by interim head coach Josh Reynolds.

== Previous season ==
The Wildcats finished the 2021 NCAA Division I baseball season 15–21 overall (15–21 conference) and tenth place in conference standings, as the season was limited to only conference games for all Big Ten teams due to the COVID-19 pandemic.

== Preseason ==
On May 31, 2021, Spencer Allen resigned as the head coach of Northwestern. That same day, Wildcats pitching coach, Josh Reynolds was named the interim head coach for the 2022 season. On August 2, 2021, Reynolds added his former head coach, Brad Hill to his coaching staff. On August 19, 2021, Reynolds finished his coaching staff, naming Jimmy Frankos as his volunteer assistant.

== Roster ==
2022 Northwestern Wildcats baseball team
Players
Coaches

#	Pos.	Name	B/T	Height	Weight	Year	Previous school	Home town
1	INF	Evan Minarovic	/	5 ft 11 in (1.8 m)	170 lb (77 kg)	Jr	The John Cooper School	The Woodlands, Texas
2	INF	Vincent Bianchina	/	5 ft 10 in (1.78 m)	180 lb (82 kg)	So	De La Salle H. S.	Lafayette, California
4	INF	Tony Livermore	/	5 ft 9 in (1.75 m)	160 lb (73 kg)	So	Mount Carmel H. S.	Chicago, Illinois
5	RHP	Tommy D'Alise	/R	6 ft 1 in (1.85 m)	190 lb (86 kg)	Sr	Lubbock-Cooper H. S.	Lubbock, Texas
7	INF	Patrick Herrera	/	6 ft 1 in (1.85 m)	—	Fr	Skyline H. S.	Mesa, Arizona
9	C	Bennett Markinson	/	6 ft 1 in (1.85 m)	—	Fr	Harvard-Westlake School	Tarzana, California
10		Luke Tanner	/	6 ft 1 in (1.85 m)	180 lb (82 kg)	Jr	Windward School	Los Angeles, California
11	OF	Andrew Pinkston	/	5 ft 9 in (1.75 m)	—	Fr	Lovett School	Smyrna, Georgia
13		Stephen Hrustich	/R	6 ft 0 in (1.83 m)	—	Jr	Parkview H. S.	Lilburn, Georgia
14	LHP	Parker Hanks	/L	6 ft 1 in (1.85 m)	190 lb (86 kg)	Sr	Ozark H. S.	Ozark, Missouri
15	RHP	Mike Doherty	/R	6 ft 3 in (1.91 m)	220 lb (100 kg)	Sr	Middlesex School	Sandwich, Massachusetts
16		Alex Roessner	/	6 ft 3 in (1.91 m)	195 lb (88 kg)	Fr	Collegiate School	New York, New York
17		Ben Grable	/R	6 ft 4 in (1.93 m)	205 lb (93 kg)	So	Flintridge Preparatory School	Pasadena, California
19	RHP	Jacob Scharm	/R	6 ft 4 in (1.93 m)	—	Fr	Naperville North H. S.	Naperville, Illinois
20		Anthony Calarco	R/R	6 ft 3 in (1.91 m)	215 lb (98 kg)	Sr	New Trier H. S.	Wilmette, Illinois
21	RHP	Jack Sauser	/R	6 ft 6 in (1.98 m)	195 lb (88 kg)	Jr	University H. S.	Bloomington, Illinois
22		Jay Beshears	/R	—	—	So	Community School of Naples	Naples, Florida
23	OF	Ruben Fontes	/	6 ft 2 in (1.88 m)	200 lb (91 kg)	RS Sr	Northview H. S.	Bonita, California
25		Alex Calarco	/	6 ft 5 in (1.96 m)	235 lb (107 kg)	Fr	New Trier H. S.	Wilmette, Illinois
26	RHP	David Utagawa	/R	6 ft 3 in (1.91 m)	220 lb (100 kg)	So	Corona del Sol H. S.	Phoenix, Arizona
27	LHP	Sean Sullivan	/L	6 ft 3 in (1.91 m)	185 lb (84 kg)	Fr	Tabor Academy	Andover, Massachusetts
29	RHP	Michael Farinelli	/R	5 ft 11 in (1.8 m)	200 lb (91 kg)	RS Sr	Horace Mann School	New York, New York
31	RHP	Chad Readey	/R	6 ft 6 in (1.98 m)	190 lb (86 kg)	Fr	Homewood-Flossmoor H. S.	Flossmoor, Illinois
32	OF	Ethan O'Donnell	/	6 ft 1 in (1.85 m)	180 lb (82 kg)	So	Regis Jesuit H. S.	Highlands Ranch, Colorado
33	C	J. C. Santini	/	5 ft 11 in (1.8 m)	190 lb (86 kg)	RS Sr	Woodcreek H. S.	Roseville, California
34	RHP	Coby Moe	/R	6 ft 4 in (1.93 m)	220 lb (100 kg)	Jr	Grayslake Central H. S.	Grayslake, Illinois
35	RHP	Grant Comstock	/R	6 ft 6 in (1.98 m)	—	Fr	Valparaiso H. S.	Valparaiso, Indiana
39	RHP	Kellen Pate	/R	6 ft 3 in (1.91 m)	185 lb (84 kg)	So	Shiloh Christian School	Rogers, Arkansas
44	RHP	Jack Dyke	/R	6 ft 4 in (1.93 m)	215 lb (98 kg)	Jr	St. Ignatius College Preparatory	San Francisco, California
55	RHP	Reed Smith	/R	5 ft 9 in (1.75 m)	180 lb (82 kg)	Jr	The John Cooper School	Cypress, Texas

Head coach

Josh Reynolds

Assistant coach(es)

Brad Hill
Jimmy Frankos

Hitting coach(es)

Dusty Napoleon

Legend

- (C) Team captain
- (S) Suspended
- (I) Ineligible
- Injured
- Current redshirt

Roster
Last update: March 4, 2021

== Schedule ==
2022 Northwestern Wildcats baseball game log
Regular season
February (1–7)

#	Date	Opponent	Site/stadium	Score	Win	Loss	Save	Attendance	Overall record	B1G record
1	February 18	at UAB	Jerry D. Young Memorial Field • Birmingham, Alabama	7–8	C. Myers (1–0)	Moe (0–1)	None	372	0–1	–
2	February 19	at UAB	Jerry D. Young Memorial Field • Birmingham, Alabama	1–4	O'Clair (1–0)	Dyke (0–1)	Greene (1)	295	0–2	–
3	February 19	at UAB	Jerry D. Young Memorial Field • Birmingham, Alabama	4–10	Ballard (1–0)	Smith (0–1)	None	295	0–3	–
4	February 20	at UAB	Jerry D. Young Memorial Field • Birmingham, Alabama	5–11	Walton (1–0)	Pate (0–1)	None	233	0–4	–
5	February 25	at Santa Clara	Stephen Schott Stadium • Santa Clara, California	4–12	Kitchen (1–1)	Doherty (1–1)	None	426	0–5	–
6	February 26	at Santa Clara	Stephen Schott Stadium • Santa Clara, California	10–0	Sullivan (1–0)	Hales (0–1)	Moe (1)	371	1–5	–
7	February 26	at Santa Clara	Stephen Schott Stadium • Santa Clara, California	3–10	Feikes (2–0)	Farinelli (0–1)	Sando (1)	371	1–6	–
8	February 27	at Santa Clara	Stephen Schott Stadium • Santa Clara, California	2–7	Reelfs (1–1)	Pate (0–2)	None	308	1–7	–

March (8–4)

#	Date	Opponent	Site/stadium	Score	Win	Loss	Save	Attendance	Overall record	B1G record
9	March 4	at Cincinnati	UC Baseball Stadium • Cincinnati, Ohio	4–5	Weaver (2–1)	Doherty (0–2)	None	850	1–8	–
10	March 4	at Cincinnati	UC Baseball Stadium • Cincinnati, Ohio	10–8	Utagawa (1–0)	Bergman (0–1)	None	850	2–8	–
11	March 5	at Cincinnati	UC Baseball Stadium • Cincinnati, Ohio	2–4	Steckline (1–0)	Farinelli (0–2)	None	2,042	2–9	–
12	March 5	at Cincinnati	UC Baseball Stadium • Cincinnati, Ohio	5–16	Linn (1–0)	Pate (0–3)	None	1.634	2–10	–
–	March 11	St. Thomas (MN)	Rocky Miller Park • Evanston, Illinois	Game cancelled						
–	March 12	St. Thomas (MN)	Rocky Miller Park • Evanston, Illinois	Game cancelled						
13	March 13	St. Thomas (MN)	Rocky Miller Park • Evanston, Illinois	9–0	Sullivan (2–0)	Laubscher (0–3)	None	245	3–10	–
14	March 13	St. Thomas (MN)	Rocky Miller Park • Evanston, Illinois	3–2	Utagawa (2–0)	Schewe (0–1)	None	290	4–10	–
–	March 19	Evansville	Rocky Miller Park • Evanston, Illinois	Game cancelled						
15	March 20	Evansville	Rocky Miller Park • Evanston, Illinois	10–4	Sullivan (3–0)	Gray (3–2)	None	450	5–10	–
16	March 20	Evansville	Rocky Miller Park • Evanston, Illinois	8–1	Farinelli (1–2)	Smith (2–1)	None	410	6–10	–
–	March 22	at Notre Dame	Frank Eck Stadium • Notre Dame, Indiana	Game cancelled						
17	March 25	vs Southern Illinois	Bulldog Park • Indianapolis, Indiana	10–4	Sullivan (4–0)	Hansell (4–1)	None	431	7–10	–
18	March 25	at Butler	Bulldog Park • Indianapolis, Indiana	13–3	Farinelli (2–2)	Bosecker (0–3)	None	203	8–10	–
19	March 26	vs Southern Illinois	Bulldog Park • Indianapolis, Indiana	15–6	Moe (1–1)	Steidl (0–2)	None	731	9–10	–
20	March 27	at Butler	Bulldog Park • Indianapolis, Indiana	10–11	Drees (1–0)	Comstock (0–1)	None	245	9–11	–

April (11–7)

#	Date	Opponent	Site/stadium	Score	Win	Loss	Save	Attendance	Overall record	B1G record
21	April 1	at Indiana	Bart Kaufman Field • Bloomington, Indiana	4–5	Holderfield (1–1)	Moe (1–2)	Tucker (1)	1,454	9–12	0–1
22	April 2	at Indiana	Bart Kaufman Field • Bloomington, Indiana	7–6	Farinelli (3–2)	Brehmer (3–2)	Beshears (1)	1,768	10–12	1–1
23	April 3	at Indiana	Bart Kaufman Field • Bloomington, Indiana	13–6	Sauser (1–0)	Stahl (0–1)	None	1,980	11–12	2–1
24	April 5	UIC	Rocky Miller Park • Evanston, Illinois	13–3	Scharm (1–0)	Jeff (0–1)	None	159	12–12	2–1
25	April 9	Penn State	Rocky Miller Park • Evanston, Illinois	5–4	Moe (2–2)	Miller (1–2)	None	278	13–12	3–1
26	April 9	Penn State	Rocky Miller Park • Evanston, Illinois	1–4	Tulio (2–1)	Farinelli (3–3)	Luensmann (1)	278	13–13	3–2
27	April 10	Penn State	Rocky Miller Park • Evanston, Illinois	5–2	Beshears (1–0)	Mellott (1–4)	None	375	14–13	4–2
28	April 12	Roosevelt	Rocky Miller Park • Evanston, Illinois	14–4	Hanks (1–3)	Winston (0–1)	None	133	15–13	4–2
29	April 15	at Illinois	Illinois Field • Champaign, Illinois	6–7	Rybarczyk (2–1)	Moe (2–3)	None	929	15–14	4–3
30	April 16	at Illinois	Illinois Field • Champaign, Illinois	6–11	Crowder (2–1)	Farinelli (3–4)	None	1,781	15–15	4–4
31	April 17	at Illinois	Illinois Field • Champaign, Illinois	0–3	Gowens (4–1)	Comstock (0–2)	Vera (1)	574	15–16	4–5
32	April 19	Saint Louis	Rocky Miller Park • Evanston, Illinois	8–5	Hanks (2–0)	Holmes (1–2)	Beshears (2)	131	16–16	4–5
33	April 22	Michigan State	Rocky Miller Park • Evanston, Illinois	14–2	Sullivan (5–0)	Powers (2–5)	None	553	17–16	5–5
34	April 23	Michigan State	Rocky Miller Park • Evanston, Illinois	4–1	Farinelli (4–4)	Tomasic (2–2)	Beshears (3)	657	18–16	6–5
35	April 24	Michigan State	Rocky Miller Park • Evanston, Illinois	7–11	Bischoff (2–1)	Comstock (0–3)	Carson (1)	293	18–17	6–6
36	April 26	Milwaukee	Rocky Miller Park • Evanston, Illinois	8–0	Doherty (1–2)	DeYoung (0–2)	None	93	19–17	6–6
37	April 29	at No. 23 Maryland	Bob "Turtle" Smith Stadium • College Park, Maryland	0–13	Ramsey (8–0)	Sullivan (5–1)	None	1,270	19–18	6–7
38	April 30	at No. 23 Maryland	Bob "Turtle" Smith Stadium • College Park, Maryland	7–4	Moe (3–3)	Falco (4–1)	Doherty (1)	2,576	20–18	7–7

May (4–9)

#	Date	Opponent	Site/stadium	Score	Win	Loss	Save	Attendance	Overall record	B1G record
39	May 1	at No. 23 Maryland	Bob "Turtle" Smith Stadium • College Park, Maryland	5–10	Falco (5–1)	Hanks (2–1)	None	568	20–19	7–8
40	May 4	at UIC	Les Miller Field at Curtis Granderson Stadium • Chicago, Illinois	0–13	Torres (1–2)	Utagawa (2–1)	None	145	20–20	7–8
41	May 7	Ohio State	Rocky Miller Park • Evanston, Illinois	6–14	Haberthier (1–4)	Moe (3–4)	None	543	20–21	7–9
42	May 7	Ohio State	Rocky Miller Park • Evanston, Illinois	9–25	Coupet (3–5)	Farinelli (4–5)	None	543	20–22	7–10
43	May 8	Ohio State	Rocky Miller Park • Evanston, Illinois	5–6	Baird (2–0)	Smith (0–2)	Hammerberg (5)	526	20–23	7–11
44	May 10	at Milwaukee	Franklin Field • Franklin, Wisconsin	21–8	Hanks (3–1)	Neu (1–1)	None	398	21–23	7–11
45	May 13	Purdue	Rocky Miller Park • Evanston, Illinois	8–14	Stephen (3–3)	Sullivan (5–2)	None	673	21–24	7–12
46	May 14	Purdue	Rocky Miller Park • Evanston, Illinois	11–1	Farinelli (5–5)	Wendell (5–3)	None	609	22–24	8–12
47	May 15	Purdue	Rocky Miller Park • Evanston, Illinois	2–7	Wansing (4–4)	Comstock (4–4)	Weins (3)	608	22–25	8–13
48	May 17	No. 14 Notre Dame	Rocky Miller Park • Evanston, Illinois	4–14	Birkholz (1–0)	Utagawa (2–2)	None	447	22–26	8–13
49	May 19	at Minnesota	Siebert Field • Minneapolis, Minnesota	14–15	Skoro (1–0)	Beshears (1–1)	None	405	22–27	8–14
50	May 20	at Minnesota	Siebert Field • Minneapolis, Minnesota	11–9	Farinelli (6–5)	Massey (2–8)	Hanks (1)	485	23–27	9–14
51	May 21	at Minnesota	Siebert Field • Minneapolis, Minnesota	8–5	Sauser (2–0)	Skoro (1–1)	None	736	24–27	10–14

== Awards ==
=== Big Ten Conference Players of the Week ===
Weekly Awards
Player	Award	Date Awarded	Ref.
Sean Sullivan	Freshman of the Week	March 2, 2022	
Sean Sullivan	Co-Pitcher of the Week	March 16, 2022	
Sean Sullivan	Co-Freshman of the Week	March 16, 2022	
Ethan O'Donnell	Player of the Week	March 29, 2022	
Ruben Fontes	Co-Player of the Week	May 24, 2022	

=== Conference awards ===
Awards
Player	Award	Date Awarded	Ref.
Ethan O'Donnell	Second team All-Big Ten	May 24, 2022	
Patrick Herrera	Second team All-Big Ten	May 24, 2022	
Sean Sullivan	Freshman team All-Big Ten	May 24, 2022	
