= Robin Lund =

Canadian baseball coach (born 1972)

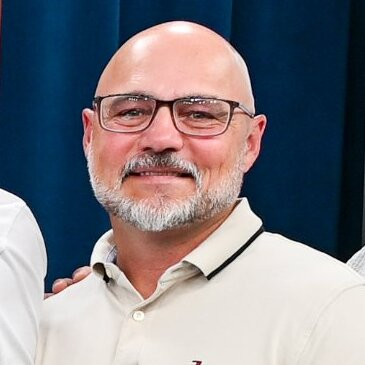
- Lund at the Pentagon in 2025

Detroit Tigers – No. 63
- Coach
- Born: July 2, 1972 (age 54); Peace River, Alberta, Canada

Teams
- As coach: Detroit Tigers (2023–present)

Robin Joseph Lund (born July 2, 1972) is a Canadian professional baseball coach. He is the assistant pitching coach for the Detroit Tigers of Major League Baseball (MLB).

== Early life and education ==
Lund was born on 2 July 1972 in Peace River, Alberta. He played baseball in Canada through the eighth grade, when organized baseball programs ceased. He moved to Lewiston, Idaho, and stayed with a foster family to continue playing baseball at Lewiston High School. He played college baseball at Spokane Falls Community College. Lund earned a bachelor's degree in education from Whitworth College in 1995, a master's degree in exercise science from Eastern Washington University in 1997, and a Doctor of Philosophy in exercise science from the University of Idaho in 2002.

== Career ==
Lund worked at the University of Northern Iowa as an associate professor in the Department of Kinesiology for 17 years before joining the University of Iowa as the pitching coach for the Iowa Hawkeyes in 2013.

On November 6, 2022, the Detroit Tigers hired Lund as their assistant pitching coach for the 2023 season.

== Personal life ==
Lund met his wife, Susie, in Lewiston. They have three children.
