= Cameron Weston =

American baseball player (born 2000)

Miami Marlins
- Pitcher
- Born: August 27, 2000 (age 26); Pittsburgh, Pennsylvania, U.S.
- Bats: Right Throws: Right

MLB debut
- May 28, 2026, for the Baltimore Orioles

MLB statistics (through 2026 season)
- Win–loss record: 0–0
- Earned run average: 0.00
- Strikeouts: 1
- Stats at Baseball Reference

Teams
- Baltimore Orioles (2026)

Cameron Edward Weston (born August 27, 2000) is an American professional baseball pitcher for the Miami Marlins of Major League Baseball (MLB). He has previously played in MLB for the Baltimore Orioles. He made his MLB debut in 2026.

== Amateur career ==
Weston attended Canon-McMillan High School in Canonsburg, Pennsylvania and the University of Michigan, where he played college baseball for the Michigan Wolverines. As a redshirt sophomore at Michigan in 2022, Weston appeared in twenty games and went 5–4 with a 4.74 ERA and 92 strikeouts. That summer, he briefly played in the Cape Cod Baseball League with the Wareham Gatemen.

== Professional career ==
=== Baltimore Orioles ===
The Baltimore Orioles selected Weston in the eighth round (227th overall) of the 2022 Major League Baseball draft and signed.

Weston made his professional debut with the Single-A Delmarva Shorebirds, posting a 3.18 ERA over five appearances. He missed time in 2023 due to injury but still appeared in 13 games between the rookie-level Florida Complex League Orioles and High-A Aberdeen IronBirds, going 3–1 with a 3.35 ERA over 43 innings. Weston was assigned to Aberdeen to open the 2024 season and was quickly promoted to the Double-A Bowie Baysox. Over 27 games (18 starts) between the two teams, he went 7–10 with a 2.97 ERA and 127 strikeouts over 109 innings. Weston was invited to 2025 spring training and was selected to Baltimore's Spring Breakout roster. He was assigned to the Triple-A Norfolk Tides for the 2025 season. Over 29 appearances (26 starts) for Norfolk, Weston pitched to a 5–9 record, a 4.59 ERA, and 133 strikeouts over 135 1/3 innings.

The Orioles assigned Weston to Norfolk to open the 2026 season. On May 28, 2026, the Orioles selected Weston's contract to the 40-man roster and promoted him to the major leagues for the first time. He made his MLB debut that night against the Toronto Blue Jays and pitched one scoreless inning in relief, recording his first MLB strikeout against Andrés Giménez. This marked his only appearance for Baltimore, and he was optioned back to Norfolk the next day. He made 31 appearances for Norfolk and had a 1–4 record, a 7.89 ERA, and 66 strikeouts across 51 1/3 innings. On September 1, he was designated for assignment by Baltimore.

=== New York Mets ===
On September 3, 2026, Weston was claimed off waivers by the New York Mets and optioned to the Triple-A Syracuse Mets. He made four relief appearances for Syracuse and had a 1.42 ERA with ten strikeouts across 6 1/3 innings.

=== Miami Marlins ===
On November 2, 2026, Weston was claimed off of waivers by the Miami Marlins.
