= Duane Banks Field =

Baseball stadium in Iowa City, Iowa, US

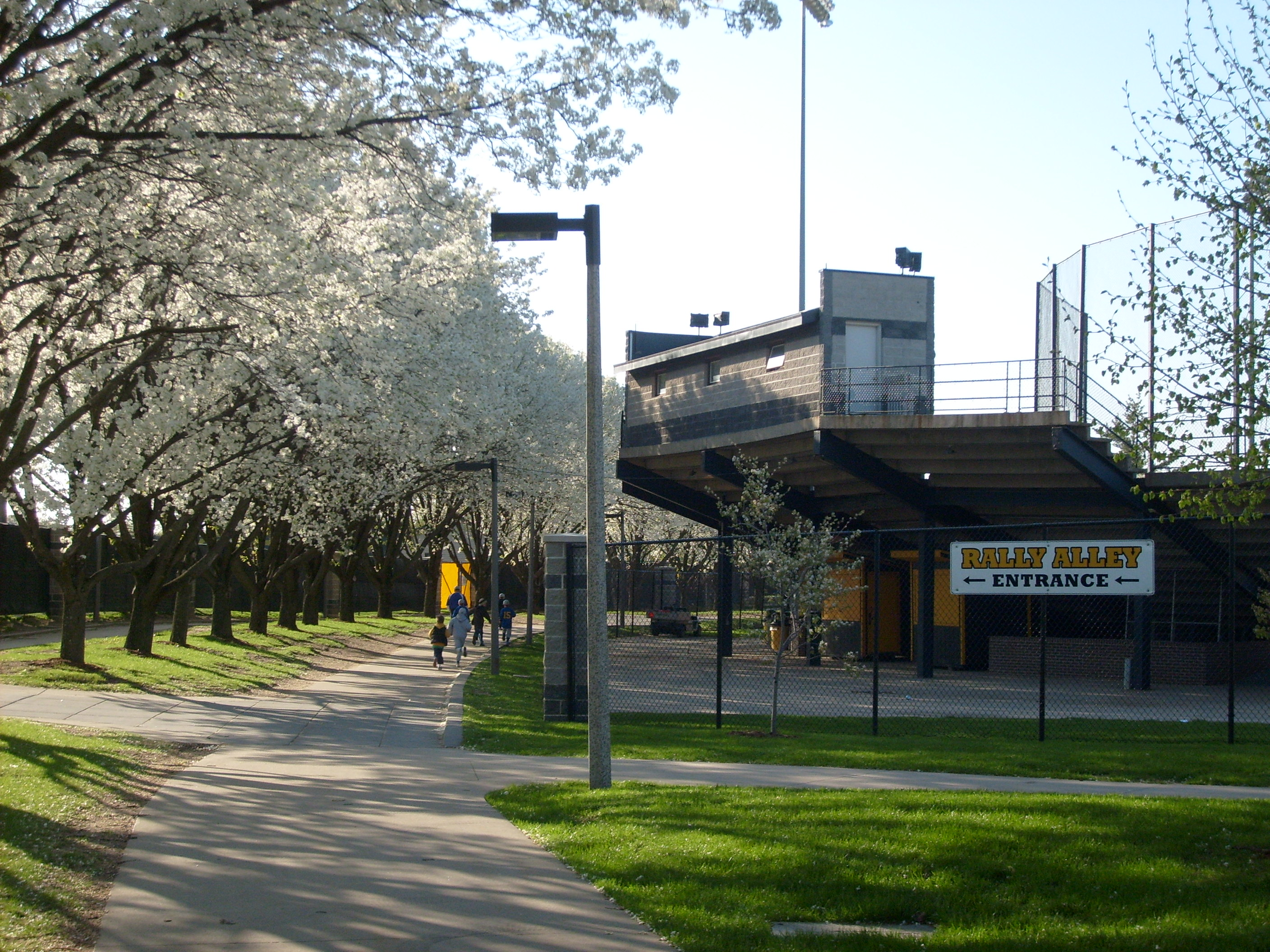
- Outside of Duane Banks Field in Iowa City, Iowa

- Location within Iowa Location within the United States
- Former names: Iowa Field (1974–2000)
- Address: 960 Stadium Drive
- Location: Iowa City, Iowa
- Coordinates: 41.6612564°N 91.5567949°W
- Owner: University of Iowa
- Operator: University of Iowa
- Capacity: 3,000
- Type: Stadium
- Event: Baseball
- Surface: AstroTurf
- Scoreboard: Digital
- Field size: LF: 329 ft (100.3 m); LC: 373 ft (113.7 m); CF: 395 ft (120.4 m); RC: 373 ft (113.7 m); RF: 329 ft (100.3 m)

Construction
- Built: 1973
- Opened: 1974
- Expanded: 2010

Tenant
- Iowa Hawkeyes baseball (NCAA) (1974–present)

Website
- hawkeyesports.com/duane-banks-field/

Duane Banks Field is a baseball stadium in Iowa City, Iowa, United States. It is the home field of the University of Iowa Hawkeyes college baseball team. The stadium holds 3,000 people and opened in 1974. It is named after former Iowa Hawkeyes baseball coach Duane Banks.

== History ==
The venue hosted the 1990 Big Ten Conference baseball tournament, won by Illinois.

The field was renamed in honor of Banks in 2001.

Following the 2010 season, the facility received a new playing surface. Other renovations included new batting cages and increased dimensions and foul territory space.

== See also ==
- List of NCAA Division I baseball venues
