= Purdue Boilermakers baseball statistical leaders =

The Purdue Boilermakers baseball statistical leaders are individual statistical leaders of the Purdue Boilermakers baseball program in various categories, including batting average, home runs, runs batted in, runs, hits, stolen bases, ERA, and Strikeouts. Within those areas, the lists identify single-game, single-season, and career leaders. The Boilermakers represent Purdue University in the NCAA's Big Ten Conference.

Purdue began competing in intercollegiate baseball in 1888. These lists are updated through the end of the 2025 season.

== Batting Average ==
Career (min. 400 AB)
Rk	Player	AVG	Seasons
1	Brandon Haveman	.399	2008 2009
2	Ryne White	.379	2006 2007 2008
3	Mitch Hilligoss	.378	2004 2005 2006
4	Dave Scheitlin	.353	1988 1989 1990 1991
5	Cameron Perkins	.348	2010 2011 2012
	Kevin Plawecki	.348	2010 2011 2012
7	Eric Charles	.345	2008 2009 2010 2011 2012
8	Steve Urbanski	.342	1979 1980 1981 1982
9	Daryl Hallada	.340	1997 1998 1999 2000
10	Daniel Underwood	.338	2000 2001 2002 2003

Season (min. 175 AB)
Rk	Player	AVG	Season
1	Ryne White	.452	2007
2	Phil Hollis	.432	1991
3	Brandon Haveman	.422	2009
4	Mitch Hilligoss	.404	2005
5	Daryl Hallada	.402	1998
6	Mitch Hilligoss	.386	2006
7	Brandon Haveman	.379	2008
	Mike Galle	.379	1989
	Dave Scheitlin	.379	1989
10	Archi Cianfrocco	.378	1987

== Home Runs ==
Career
Rk	Player	HR	Seasons
1	Mike Biltimier	39	1991 1992 1993
2	Dan Black	36	2007 2008 2009
3	Brett Roach	33	1986 1987
4	Nate Sickler	32	1998 1999 2000 2001
5	Mike Galle	31	1986 1987 1988 1989
	Bob Shoulders	31	1984 1985 1986 1987
7	Kyle Wood	26	2013 2014 2015 2016
	Ryne White	26	2006 2007 2008
9	Cameron Perkins	25	2010 2011 2012
	Daniel Underwood	25	2000 2001 2002 2003

Season
Rk	Player	HR	Season
1	Brett Roach	21	1987
2	Dan Black	18	2008
3	Archi Cianfrocco	17	1987
4	Mike Galle	16	1988
5	Logan Sutter	15	2025
	Dan Black	15	2009
7	Mike Biltimier	14	1992
	Jeff Allison	14	1986
9	Connor Caskenette	13	2024
	Luke Gaffney	13	2024
	Keenan Spence	13	2024
	Cam Thompson	13	2022
	Jacson McGowan	13	2018
	Mike Biltimier	13	1993

Single Game
Rk	Player	HR	Season	Opponent
1	Dan Black	3	2008	Indiana
	John Hunter	3	2004	Minnesota
	Daniel Underwood	3	2003	Iowa
4	67 times	2	Most recent: Avery Moore, 2026 vs. Indiana	

== Runs Batted In ==
Career
Rk	Player	RBI	Seasons
1	Elam Rossy	196	1982 1983 1984 1985
2	Mike Biltimier	177	1991 1992 1993
3	Bob Shoulders	158	1984 1985 1986 1987
4	Daniel Underwood	151	2000 2001 2002 2003
5	Nate Sickler	149	1998 1999 2000 2001
6	Cameron Perkins	148	2010 2011 2012
7	Dan Black	146	2007 2008 2009
8	Mike Galle	145	1986 1987 1988 1989
9	Nick McIntyre	144	2000 2001 2002 2003
	Daryl Hallada	144	1997 1998 1999 2000

Season
Rk	Player	RBI	Season
1	Mike Biltimier	74	1993
2	Brett Roach	73	1987
3	Dan Black	70	2008
4	Connor Caskenette	69	2024
5	Luke Gaffney	64	2024
6	Logan Sutter	62	2025
7	Cameron Perkins	61	2012
	Archi Cianfrocco	61	1987
9	Jacson McGowan	59	2018
	Mike Galle	59	1988

Single Game
Rk	Player	RBI	Season	Opponent
1	John Hunter	9	2004	Minnesota
2	Aaron Manias	8	2025	Indiana State
	Neal Gorka	8	2006	Indiana
	Nate Sickler	8	2001	Butler
	Mike Biltimier	8	1993	Temple
6	7 times	7	Most recent: Connor Caskenette, 2024 vs. Northwestern	

== Runs ==
Career
Rk	Player	R	Seasons
1	Eric Charles	178	2008 2009 2010 2011 2012
2	Jose Rossy	168	1984 1985 1986 1987
3	Nate Sickler	166	1998 1999 2000 2001
4	Bob Shoulders	165	1984 1985 1986 1987
5	Tyler Spillner	162	2009 2010 2011 2012
6	Mike Bolton Jr.	160	2020 2021 2022 2023 2024
7	Doug Schreiber	159	1983 1984 1985 1986
8	Skyler Hunter	155	2017 2018 2019 2020 2021
	Daniel Underwood	155	2000 2001 2002 2003
10	Daryl Hallada	151	1997 1998 1999 2000

Season
Rk	Player	R	Season
1	Luke Gaffney	62	2024
	Mitch Hilligoss	62	2006
3	Brandon Anderson	60	2025
	Brandon Haveman	60	2008
5	Dave Scheitlin	57	1990
6	Stephen Talbott	55	2011
	Logan Sutter	55	2025
8	Kevin Plawecki	54	2012
9	Cameron Perkins	53	2012
	Ryne White	53	2008
	Jeff Allison	53	1987

Single Game
Rk	Player	R	Season	Opponent
1	Logan Sutter	5	2025	Niagara
	David Blount	5	2011	Morehead State
	Eric Nielsen	5	2009	IPFW
	Mike Coles	5	2004	Penn State
	Tyler Johnstone	5	2003	Scared Heart
	Dan Zanolla	5	1993	Temple

== Hits ==
Career
Rk	Player	H	Seasons
1	Daryl Hallada	279	1997 1998 1999 2000
2	Eric Charles	276	2008 2009 2010 2011 2012
3	Skyler Hunter	268	2017 2018 2019 2020 2021
4	Daniel Underwood	266	2000 2001 2002 2003
5	Elam Rossy	246	1982 1983 1984 1985
6	Tyler Spillner	242	2009 2010 2011 2012
	Nick McIntyre	242	2000 2001 2002 2003
8	Cameron Perkins	241	2010 2011 2012
9	Bob Shoulders	234	1984 1985 1986 1987
10	Steve Urbanski	231	1979 1980 1981 1982

Season
Rk	Player	H	Season
1	Mitch Hilligoss	92	2005
2	Ryne White	90	2007
3	Mitch Hilligoss	88	2006
4	Cameron Perkins	86	2012
5	Eric Charles	84	2012
6	Brandon Haveman	83	2008
7	Archi Cianfrocco	82	1987
8	Cameron Perkins	81	2011
9	Kevin Plawecki	80	2012
10	Eric Charles	79	2011
	Daryl Hallada	79	1999
	Phil Hollis	79	1991

Single Game
Rk	Player	H	Season	Opponent
1	Logan Sutter	6	2025	Niagara
2	16 times	5	Most recent: Evan Albrecht, 2020 vs. Western Kentucky	

== Stolen Bases ==
Career
Rk	Player	SB	Seasons
1	Mike Bolton Jr.	97	2020 2021 2022 2023 2024
2	Dave Scheitlin	70	1988 1989 1990 1991
3	Jeff Allison	69	1984 1985 1986 1987
4	Chris Walker	60	1997 1998 1999 2000
5	Chris Dietrick	57	1978 1979 1980 1981
6	Stephen Talbot	55	2010 2011 2012 2013
7	Harry Shipley	51	2015 2016 2017 2018
8	Craig Robertshaw	50	1988 1989 1990 1991
9	Eric Charles	49	2008 2009 2010 2011 2012
	Mitch Hilligoss	49	2004 2005 2006

Season
Rk	Player	SB	Season
1	Jeff Allison	33	1987
2	Curtis Washington Jr.	31	2022
3	Dave Scheitlin	30	1991
4	Mike Bolton Jr.	28	2023
	Mike Bolton Jr.	28	2022
6	Nick Dalesandro	27	2018
7	Couper Cornblum	26	2023
	Dave Scheitlin	26	1990
9	Mitch Hilligoss	25	2005
	Chris Dietrick	25	1981

Single Game
Rk	Player	SB	Season	Opponent
1	Jon Moore	4	2010	West Virginia
	Beau Baltzell	4	1996	Texas-Pan Am
3	20 times	3	Most recent: Camden Gasser, 2024 vs. UAlbany	

== Earned Run Average ==
Career (min. 125 IP)
Rk	Player	ERA	Seasons
1	Steve Krull	1.46	1965 1966 1967
2	Steve Cunningham	2.81	1964 1965 1966
3	Bill Johnston	3.25	1969 1970 1971
4	Trent Johnson	3.26	2018 2019 2020 2021
5	Mike Hedman	3.38	1994 1995 1996 1997
6	Lance Breedlove	3.39	2011 2012
7	Chadd Blasko	3.47	2000 2001 2002
8	Trae Dauby	3.49	2003 2004 2005 2006
9	Blake Mascarello	3.51	2009 2010 2011 2012
10	Bob Hallas	3.52	1979 1980 1981 1982

Season (min. 60 IP)
Rk	Player	ERA	Season
1	Steve Krull	1.04	1967
2	Blake Mascarello	1.86	2012
3	Sherard Clinkscales	2.34	1992
4	Tom Mayer	2.44	1985
5	Gary Parks	2.66	1976
6	Bob Hallas	2.71	1981
7	Matt Frawley	2.78	2016
8	Steve Cunningham	2.81	1966
9	Trent Johnson	2.83	2019
10	Matt Bischoff	2.85	2007

== Strikeouts ==
Career
Rk	Player	K	Seasons
1	Matt Bischoff	291	2007 2008 2009 2010
2	Chris Bloomer	257	1994 1995 1996 1997
3	Jason Smith	222	1990 1991 1992 1993
4	Matt Morgan	218	2008 2009 2010 2011
	David Gassner	218	1998 1999 2000 2001
	Andy Swain	218	1985 1986 1987 1988 1989
7	Russ Morgan	215	1997 1998 1999 2000
8	Scott Byrnes	211	2002 2003 2004 2005
9	Mike Hedman	198	1994 1995 1996 1997
10	Sherard Clinkscales	190	1990 1991 1992

Season
Rk	Player	K	Season
1	Matt Bischoff	95	2010
2	Sherard Clinkscales	87	1992
	Andy Swain	87	1989
4	Scott Byrnes	85	2004
	Chris Bloomer	85	1997
6	Matt Bischoff	80	2009
7	Jackson Smeltz	79	2022
	Ben Quick	79	2001
9	Tanner Andrews	78	2018
	Chadd Blasko	78	2002

Single Game
Rk	Player	K	Season	Opponent
1	Chadd Blasko	15	2002	Miami (Ohio)
2	Matt Morgan	14	2010	Ohio
3	Jackson Smeltz	13	2022	Indiana
	David Gassner	13	1999	Wright State
5	Matt Bischoff	12	2009	Miss. Valley St.
	Dan Sattler	12	2006	Northwestern
	Chadd Blasko	12	2002	Iowa
	Ben Quick	12	2000	Illinois
	Russ Morgan	12	1999	Wright State
