= 2025 Nebraska Cornhuskers baseball team =

College baseball team season

2025 Nebraska Cornhuskers baseball

Big Ten tournament champions

Chapel Hill Regional, 1–2
- Conference: Big Ten Conference
- Record: 33–29 (15–15 Big Ten)
- Head coach: Will Bolt (6th season)
- Assistant coach: Lance Harvell (6th season)
- Hitting coach: Mike Sirianni (2nd season)
- Pitching coach: Rob Childress (2nd season)
- Home stadium: Haymarket Park

2025 Big Ten Conference baseball standings
| | Conf. | | | | | | Overall |
| Team | W | | L | | T | PCT | W | | L | | T | PCT |
|---|---|---|---|---|---|---|---|---|---|---|---|---|
| No. 5 Oregon ‍†‍‍^{y} | 22 | – | 8 | – | 0 | .733 | 42 | – | 16 | – | 0 | .724 |
| No. 13 UCLA ‍†‍‍^{y} | 22 | – | 8 | – | 0 | .733 | 48 | – | 16 | – | 0 | .750 |
| Iowa ‍‍‍ | 21 | – | 9 | – | 0 | .700 | 33 | – | 22 | – | 1 | .598 |
| USC ‍‍‍^{y} | 18 | – | 12 | – | 0 | .600 | 37 | – | 23 | – | 0 | .617 |
| Washington ‍‍‍ | 17 | – | 13 | – | 0 | .567 | 29 | – | 28 | – | 0 | .509 |
| Indiana ‍‍‍ | 16 | – | 14 | – | 0 | .533 | 32 | – | 24 | – | 0 | .571 |
| Michigan ‍‍‍ | 16 | – | 14 | – | 0 | .533 | 33 | – | 23 | – | 0 | .589 |
| Nebraska ‍‍‡‍^{y} | 15 | – | 15 | – | 0 | .500 | 33 | – | 29 | – | 0 | .532 |
| Penn State ‍‍‍ | 15 | – | 15 | – | 0 | .500 | 33 | – | 23 | – | 0 | .589 |
| Rutgers ‍‍‍ | 15 | – | 15 | – | 0 | .500 | 29 | – | 28 | – | 0 | .509 |
| Illinois ‍‍‍ | 14 | – | 16 | – | 0 | .467 | 30 | – | 24 | – | 0 | .556 |
| Michigan State ‍‍‍ | 13 | – | 17 | – | 0 | .433 | 28 | – | 27 | – | 0 | .509 |
| Northwestern ‍‍‍ | 13 | – | 17 | – | 0 | .433 | 25 | – | 27 | – | 0 | .481 |
| Maryland ‍‍‍ | 12 | – | 18 | – | 0 | .400 | 27 | – | 29 | – | 0 | .482 |
| Purdue ‍‍‍ | 11 | – | 19 | – | 0 | .367 | 31 | – | 23 | – | 0 | .574 |
| Minnesota ‍‍‍ | 10 | – | 20 | – | 0 | .333 | 24 | – | 28 | – | 0 | .462 |
| Ohio State ‍‍‍ | 5 | – | 25 | – | 0 | .167 | 13 | – | 37 | – | 0 | .260 |
† – Conference champion ‡ – Tournament champion y – Invited to the NCAA tournament As of June 2, 2025; Rankings from D1Baseball

The 2025 Nebraska Cornhuskers baseball team represented the University of Nebraska–Lincoln in the 2025 NCAA Division I baseball season. The Cornhuskers were led by head coach Will Bolt in his sixth season, were members of the Big Ten Conference and played their home games at Haymarket Park in Lincoln, Nebraska.

== Preseason ==
=== Preseason Big Ten awards and honors ===
Preseason awards will be announced in January or February 2025.

Preseason All-Big Ten Team
| Player | Position | Year | Ref. |
| Dylan Carey | SS | Junior | |
| Cael Frost | OF | Senior | |
| Mason McConnaughey | RHP | Junior | |

=== Preseason All-Americans ===
Preseason All-Americans
| Player | Position | Selector | Ref. |
|---|---|---|---|
| Mason McConnaughey | RHP | D1Baseball.com; NCBWA | |

Golden Spikes Watchlist
| Player | Position | Ref. |
| Mason McConnaughey | RHP | |

=== Coaches poll ===
The coaches poll was released on February 11, 2025. Nebraska was selected to finish second in the Big Ten.

Coaches' Poll
| Predicted finish | Team | Points |
|---|---|---|
| 1 | Oregon | |
| 2 | Nebraska | |
| 3 | Indiana | |
| 4 | UCLA | |
| 5 | Michigan | |
| 6 | USC | |
| 7 | Iowa | |
| 8 | Illinois | |
| 9 | Purdue | |
| 10 | Ohio State | |
| 11 | Michigan State | |
| 12 | Washington | |
| 13 | Minnesota | |
| 14 | Penn State | |
| 15 | Maryland | |
| 16 | Northwestern | |
| 17 | Rutgers | |

== Personnel ==
=== Starters ===
Lineup
| Pos. | No. | Player. | Year |
|---|---|---|---|
| C | 34 | Colin Cymbalista | Junior |
| 1B | 14 | Case Sanderson | Sophomore |
| 2B | 0 | Cayden Brumbaugh | RS Junior |
| SS | 15 | Dylan Carey | Junior |
| 3B | 9 | Rhett Stokes | Senior |
| LF | 44 | Gabe Swansen | Senior |
| CF | 5 | Robby Bolin | Junior |
| RF | 55 | Tyler Stone | Senior |
| DH | 11 | Max Buettenback | Sophomore |

Weekend pitching rotation
| Day | No. | Player. | Year |
|---|---|---|---|
| Friday | 51 | Mason McConnaughey | Junior |
| Saturday | 20 | Ty Horn | Sophomore |
| Sunday | | | |

=== Roster ===
2025 Nebraska Cornhuskers baseball team
Players
Coaches

| # | Pos. | Name | B/T | Height | Weight | Year | Home town |
|---|---|---|---|---|---|---|---|
| 0 | UTL | Cayden Brumbaugh | R/R | 5 ft 11 in (1.8 m) | 195 lb (88 kg) | RS Jr | Edmond, OK |
| 1 | OF | Riley Silva | L/R | 6 ft 0 in (1.83 m) | 190 lb (86 kg) | Sr | Cambridge, ON |
| 4 | INF | Joshua Overbeek | S/R | 6 ft 1 in (1.85 m) | 210 lb (95 kg) | Sr | Cincinnati, OH |
| 5 | OF | Robby Bolin | L/L | 6 ft 2 in (1.88 m) | 205 lb (93 kg) | Jr | Topeka, KS |
| 6 | RHP | Pryce Bender | R/R | 6 ft 3 in (1.91 m) | 185 lb (84 kg) | Fr | Edmond, OK |
| 9 | INF | Rhett Stokes | R/R | 5 ft 10 in (1.78 m) | 195 lb (88 kg) | Sr | Roswell, NM |
| 10 | C | Hogan Helligso | R/R | 6 ft 0 in (1.83 m) | 195 lb (88 kg) | Sr | Elkhorn, NE |
| 11 | UTL | Max Buettenback | L/R | 6 ft 2 in (1.88 m) | 215 lb (98 kg) | So | Lincoln, NE |
| 12 | OF | Cael Frost | L/R | 6 ft 0 in (1.83 m) | 200 lb (91 kg) | Sr | Gilbertville, IA |
| 13 | UTL | Will Jesske | R/R | 5 ft 11 in (1.8 m) | 210 lb (95 kg) | So | Lincoln, NE |
| 14 | UTL | Case Sanderson | L/L | 6 ft 2 in (1.88 m) | 215 lb (98 kg) | So | Nevada, MO |
| 15 | INF | Dylan Carey | R/R | 6 ft 3 in (1.91 m) | 210 lb (95 kg) | Jr | Castle Rock, CO |
| 16 | INF | Devin Nunez | L/R | 5 ft 11 in (1.8 m) | 180 lb (82 kg) | Fr | Navasota, TX |
| 17 | OF | Hayden Lewis | L/L | 6 ft 1 in (1.85 m) | 205 lb (93 kg) | RS So | Yutan, NE |
| 18 | C | Kanon Sundgren | R/R | 6 ft 1 in (1.85 m) | 185 lb (84 kg) | Jr | Silsbee, TX |
| 20 | RHP | Ty Horn | L/R | 6 ft 2 in (1.88 m) | 200 lb (91 kg) | So | Halstead, KS |
| 21 | INF | Jaron Cotton | R/R | 6 ft 3 in (1.91 m) | 200 lb (91 kg) | Jr | Leander, TX |
| 23 | RHP | Blake Encarnacion | R/R | 6 ft 4 in (1.93 m) | 210 lb (95 kg) | Fr | Friendswood, TX |
| 24 | LHP | Caleb Clark | L/L | 6 ft 2 in (1.88 m) | 210 lb (95 kg) | Jr | Orillia, ON |
| 25 | RHP | Drew Christo | R/R | 6 ft 5 in (1.96 m) | 240 lb (109 kg) | Sr | Elkhorn, NE |
| 26 | RHP | TJ Coats | R/R | 6 ft 3 in (1.91 m) | 220 lb (100 kg) | So | Overland Park, KS |
| 28 | RHP | Luke Broderick | R/R | 6 ft 3 in (1.91 m) | 215 lb (98 kg) | Jr | Omaha, NE |
| 30 | LHP | Will Walsh | R/L | 6 ft 4 in (1.93 m) | 220 lb (100 kg) | RS Sr | Leawood, KS |
| 32 | RHP | Tucker Timmerman | R/R | 6 ft 3 in (1.91 m) | 220 lb (100 kg) | So | Beatrice, NE |
| 33 | LHP | Jackson Brockett | L/L | 6 ft 1 in (1.85 m) | 205 lb (93 kg) | Sr | Omaha, NE |
| 34 | C | Colin Cymbalista | R/R | 6 ft 0 in (1.83 m) | 200 lb (91 kg) | Jr | Pickering, ON |
| 35 | RHP | Ryan Harrahill | R/R | 6 ft 4 in (1.93 m) | 225 lb (102 kg) | So | Elkhorn, NE |
| 36 | LHP | Grant Cleavinger | L/L | 6 ft 5 in (1.96 m) | 225 lb (102 kg) | Jr | Lawrence, KS |
| 37 | RHP | J'Shawn Unger | R/R | 6 ft 5 in (1.96 m) | 225 lb (102 kg) | Fr | Blair, NE |
| 39 | RHP | Carson Jasa | R/R | 6 ft 7 in (2.01 m) | 225 lb (102 kg) | RS Fr | Thornton, CO |
| 41 | LHP | Chase Olson | L/L | 5 ft 11 in (1.8 m) | 180 lb (82 kg) | Fr | Raymore, MO |
| 42 | LHP | Jalen Worthley | L/L | 5 ft 10 in (1.78 m) | 185 lb (84 kg) | Jr | Lincoln, NE |
| 43 | RHP | Aiden Lieser | L/R | 6 ft 2 in (1.88 m) | 215 lb (98 kg) | Fr | Lino Lakes, MN |
| 44 | OF | Gabe Swansen | R/R | 6 ft 0 in (1.83 m) | 200 lb (91 kg) | Sr | Johnston, IA |
| 45 | RHP | Casey Daiss | R/R | 6 ft 4 in (1.93 m) | 210 lb (95 kg) | Sr | Webster, FL |
| 46 | LHP | Aiden White | L/L | 6 ft 2 in (1.88 m) | 210 lb (95 kg) | Fr | Prosper, TX |
| 47 | LHP | Colin Nowaczyk | L/L | 6 ft 1 in (1.85 m) | 190 lb (86 kg) | Fr | Elkhorn, NE |
| 50 | RHP | Gavin Blachowicz | L/R | 6 ft 3 in (1.91 m) | 205 lb (93 kg) | Fr | Olathe, KS |
| 51 | RHP | Mason McConnaughey | R/R | 6 ft 3 in (1.91 m) | 220 lb (100 kg) | Jr | Topeka, KS |
| 55 | INF | Tyler Stone | L/R | 6 ft 3 in (1.91 m) | 240 lb (109 kg) | Sr | Scottsdale, AZ |

Head coach

7 Will Bolt

Assistant coach(es)

29 Rob Childress (Pitching & catching)
22 Lance Harvell (Outfielders)
3 Mike Sirianni (Hitting & infielders)

Legend

- (C) Team captain
- (S) Suspended
- (I) Ineligible
- Injured
- Current redshirt

Roster
Last update: February 1, 2025

== Offseason ==
=== Departures ===
Offseason departures
| Name | Number | Pos. | Height | Weight | Year | Hometown | Notes |
|---|---|---|---|---|---|---|---|
| Josh Caron | 5 | C | 6 ft 0 in (1.83 m) | 215 pounds (98 kg) | Junior | Sun Prairie, WI | Declare for 2024 MLB draft; selected 121st overall by Seattle Mariners |
| Ben Columbus | 10 | C | 6 ft 0 in (1.83 m) | 205 pounds (93 kg) | Senior | North Vancouver, BC, CAN | Graduated |
| Cole Evans | 12 | OF | 6 ft 2 in (1.88 m) | 2,010 pounds (910 kg) | Senior | Grand Island, NE | Graduated |
| Garrett Anglim | 18 | OF | 6 ft 1 in (1.85 m) | 210 pounds (95 kg) | RS Junior | La Vista, NE | Graduated; did not return (Note: Player had one more year of eligibility.) |
| Kyle Perry | 19 | LHP | 6 ft 0 in (1.83 m) | 200 pounds (91 kg) | Graduate | Omaha, NE | Graduated, signed with Savannah Bananas |
| Clay Bradford | 21 | OF | 6 ft 3 in (1.91 m) | 215 pounds (98 kg) | Senior | Humble, TX | Graduated |
| Brett Sears | 34 | RHP | 6 ft 0 in (1.83 m) | 205 pounds (93 kg) | Senior | Westphalia, IA | Declare for 2024 MLB draft; selected 221st overall by Atlanta Braves |
| Rans Sanders | 48 | RHP | 6 ft 0 in (1.83 m) | 190 pounds (86 kg) | Senior | Grand Island, NE | Graduated |
| Trey Frahm | 54 | RHP | 6 ft 0 in (1.83 m) | 240 pounds (110 kg) | RS Junior | Elkhorn, NE | Graduated; did not return |

==== Outgoing transfers ====
Outgoing transfers
| Name | Number | Pos. | Height | Weight | Hometown | Year | New school | Source |
|---|---|---|---|---|---|---|---|---|
| Evan Borst | 6 | RHP | 5 ft 11 in (1.80 m) | 195 pounds (88 kg) | Des Moines, IA | Junior | Grand View | |
| Matt Evans | 2 | OF | 6 ft 0 in (1.83 m) | 185 pounds (84 kg) | Tillsonburg, ON, CAN | Freshman | Cloud County (Note: Junior college) | |
| Matt Evans | 27 | RHP | 6 ft 2 in (1.88 m) | 210 pounds (95 kg) | Roseville, CA | Freshman | Folsom Lake | |
| Kyle Froehlich | 26 | RHP | 6 ft 0 in (1.83 m) | 200 pounds (91 kg) | Nipawin, SK, CAN | Senior | Texas–Tyler | |
| Dylan Hufft | 6 | INF | 5 ft 11 in (1.80 m) | 185 pounds (84 kg) | Parkville, MO | RS Sophomore | Northwest Missouri State | |
| Bryce Hughes | 23 | INF | 5 ft 9 in (1.75 m) | 180 pounds (82 kg) | Channelview, TX | RS Junior | Texas Southern | |
| Aaron Manias | 16 | INF | 6 ft 2 in (1.88 m) | 219 pounds (99 kg) | Uxbridge, ON, CAN | Junior | Purdue | |
| Bobby Olsen | 28 | RHP | 6 ft 0 in (1.83 m) | 210 pounds (95 kg) | Powdersville, SC | Graduate | Villanova | |
| Ian Regal | 37 | LHP | 6 ft 2 in (1.88 m) | 195 pounds (88 kg) | Rochester, MN | Freshman | Butler | |
| Brooks Kneifl | 38 | LHP | 6 ft 1 in (1.85 m) | 210 pounds (95 kg) | Wayne, NE | Freshman | Wayne State (NE) | |

==== 2024 MLB draft ====
| Round | Pick | Overall pick | Player | Position | MLB team | Source |
|---|---|---|---|---|---|---|
| 4 | 18 | 121 | Josh Caron | C | Seattle Mariners | |
| 7 | 24 | 221 | Brett Sears | RHP | Atlanta Braves | |

=== Acquisitions ===
==== Incoming transfers ====
Incoming transfers
| Name | Number | Pos. | Height | Weight | Hometown | Year | Previous school | Source |
|---|---|---|---|---|---|---|---|---|
| Hogan Helligso | 10 | C | 6 ft 0 in (1.83 m) | 195 pounds (88 kg) | Elkhorn, NE | Senior | Creighton | |
| Cael Frost | 12 | OF | 6 ft 0 in (1.83 m) | 200 pounds (91 kg) | Gilbertville, IA | Senior | South Dakota State | |
| Kanon Sundgren | 18 | C | 6 ft 1 in (1.85 m) | 185 pounds (84 kg) | Silsbee, TX | Junior | Weatherford | |
| TJ Coats | 26 | RHP | 6 ft 3 in (1.91 m) | 220 pounds (100 kg) | Overland Park, KS | Sophomore | Cloud County | |
| Luke Broderick | 28 | RHP | 6 ft 3 in (1.91 m) | 215 pounds (98 kg) | Omaha, NE | Junior | Iowa Western | |
| Colin Cymbalista | 34 | RHP | 6 ft 0 in (1.83 m) | 200 pounds (91 kg) | Pickering, ON, CAN | Junior | Hutchinson | |

==== Incoming recruits ====
2024 Nebraska Recruits
| Name | Number | B/T | Pos. | Height | Weight | Hometown | High School | Source |
|---|---|---|---|---|---|---|---|---|
| Pryce Bender | 6 | R/R | RHP | 6 ft 3 in (1.91 m) | 185 pounds (84 kg) | Edmond, OK | Edmond North | |
| Gavin Blachowicz | 50 | L/R | RHP | 6 ft 3 in (1.91 m) | 205 pounds (93 kg) | Olathe, KS | Olathe South | |
| Blake Encarnacion | 23 | L/R | RHP | 6 ft 4 in (1.93 m) | 210 pounds (95 kg) | Friendswood, TX | Friendswood | |
| Aiden Lieser | 43 | L/R | RHP | 6 ft 2 in (1.88 m) | 215 pounds (98 kg) | Lino Lakes, MN | Centennial (MN) | |
| Colin Nowaczyk | 23 | L/L | LHP | 6 ft 1 in (1.85 m) | 190 pounds (86 kg) | Elkhorn, NE | Elkhorn North | |
| Devin Nuñez | 16 | L/R | INF | 5 ft 11 in (1.80 m) | 180 pounds (82 kg) | Navasota, TX | Navasota | |
| Chase Olson | 41 | L/L | LHP | 5 ft 11 in (1.80 m) | 180 pounds (82 kg) | Raymore, MO | Raymore–Peculiar | |
| J'Shawn Unger | 37 | R/R | RHP | 6 ft 5 in (1.96 m) | 225 pounds (102 kg) | Blair, NE | Blair (NE) | |
| Aidan White | 46 | L/L | LHP | 6 ft 2 in (1.88 m) | 210 pounds (95 kg) | Prosper, TX | Prosper | |

== Game log ==
2025 Nebraska Cornhuskers baseball game log (33–29)
Regular season (28–27)

February (4–4)
| Date | TV | Opponent | Rank | Stadium | Score | Win | Loss | Save | Attendance | Overall | B1G | Source |
MLB Desert Invitational
| February 14 | MLBN | vs. UC Irvine* | No. 24 | Salt River Field; Scottsdale, AZ | L 5–10 | Ojeda (1–0) | McConnaughey (0–1) | None | 1,300 | 0–1 | — | Report |
| February 15 | MLBN | vs. No. 16 Vanderbilt* | No. 24 | Salt River Field | W 6–4 | Worthley (1–0) | McElvain (0–1) | Broderick (1) | 3,000 | 1–1 | — | Report |
| February 16 | MLB.com | vs. San Diego State* | No. 24 | Sloan Park; Mesa, AZ | W 13–0 | Walsh (1–0) | Sipila (0–1) | None | 1,645 | 2–1 | — | Report |
| February 17 | ESPN+ | at Grand Canyon* | No. 23 | Brazell Field; Phoenix, AZ | L 1–3 | Higginbottom (1–0) | Chrisyo (0–1) | Quinn (1) | 3,413 | 2–2 | — | Report |
| February 21 | ESPN+ | at Louisiana* | No. 23 | Russo Park; Lafayette, LA | W 6–1 | McConnaughey (1–1) | Morgan (1–1) | None | 4,085 | 3–2 | — | Report |
| February 22 (DH 1) | | at Louisiana* | No. 23 | Russo Park | L 1–4 | McGehee (1–1) | Horn (0–1) | Theut (1) | | 3–3 | – | Report |
| February 22 (DH 2) | | at Louisiana* | No. 23 | Russo Park | L 2–10 | Hermann (1–0) | Walsh (1–1) | None | 4,131 | 3–4 | – | Report |
Frisco College Baseball Classic
| February 28 | D1B+ | vs. Sam Houston State* | | Riders Field; Frisco, TX | W 8–3 | Walsh (2–1) | Peterson (0–3) | None | 7,175 | 4–4 | – | Report |

March (8–11)
| Date | TV | Opponent | Rank | Stadium | Score | Win | Loss | Save | Attendance | Overall | B1G | Source |
Frisco College Baseball Classic
| March 1 | D1B+ | vs. No. 2 LSU* | | Riders Field | L 6–11 | Eyanson (2–0) | Jasa (0–1) | None | 11,003 | 4–5 | – | Report |
| March 2 | D1B+ | vs. Kansas State* | | Riders Field | L 6–9 | Sheffield (2–1) | Brockett (0–1) | None | | 4–6 | – | Report |
| March 4 | | at Omaha* | | Tal Anderson Field; Omaha, NE | Game postponed | | | | | | | |
| March 5 | B1G+ | South Dakota State* | | Haymarket Park; Lincoln, NE | Game canceled | | | | | | | |
| March 8 (DH 1) | B1G+ | Washington | | Haymarket Park | L 5–11 | Sweeney (1–1) | Horn (0–2) | None | | 4–7 | 0–1 | Report |
| March 8 (DH 2) | B1G+ | Washington | | Haymarket Park | L 3–6 | Thomas (2–0) | Walsh (2–2) | None | 5,469 | 4–8 | 0–2 | Report |
| March 9 | B1G+ | Washington | | Haymarket Park | W 6–2 | Christo (1–1) | Brandenburg (0–2) | Broderick (2) | 5,155 | 5–8 | 1–2 | Report |
| March 11 | B1G+ | Wichita State* | | Haymarket Park | W 10–1 | Jasa (1–1) | Miner (1–2) | None | 4,893 | 6–8 | – | Report |
| March 12 | B1G+ | Wichita State* | | Haymarket Park | W 5–4 | Blachowicz (1–0) | Dobbs (0–1) | Broderick (3) | 5,406 | 7–8 | – | Report |
| March 14 | B1G+ | at UCLA | | Jackie Robinson Stadium; Los Angeles, CA | L 2–5 | May (3–1) | Walsh (2–3) | Lee (1) | 370 | 7–9 | 1–3 | Report |
| March 15 | B1G+ | at UCLA | | Jackie Robinson Stadium | L 3–11 | Barnett (5–0) | Horn (0–3) | None | 629 | 7–10 | 1–4 | Report |
| March 16 | B1G+ | at UCLA | | Jackie Robinson Stadium | L 3–5 | O'Connor (2–0) | Clark (0–1) | Lee (2) | 623 | 7–11 | 1–5 | Report |
| March 18 | | at Pepperdine* | | Eddy D. Field Stadium; Malibu, CA | W 9–6 | Jasa (2–1) | Stewart (0–2) | Broderick (4) | 224 | 8–11 | – | Report |
| March 19 | | at Pepperdine* | | Eddy D. Field Stadium | W 11–4 | Blachowicz (2–0) | Tichy (0–2) | None | 324 | 9–11 | – | Report |
| March 21 | B1G+ | at USC | | Dedeaux Field; Los Angeles, CA | L 3–5 | Hunter (4–1) | Walsh (2–4) | Edwards (1) | 1,081 | 9–12 | 1–6 | Report |
| March 22 | B1G+ | at USC | | Dedeaux Field | W 6–5 | Broderick (1–0) | Hedges (0–1) | None | 1,209 | 10–12 | 2–6 | Report |
| March 23 | B1G+ | at USC | | Dedeaux Field | L 1–7 | Govel (2–2) | Brockett (0–2) | None | 1,304 | 10–13 | 2–7 | Report |
| March 25 | B12N+ | at Kansas State* | | Tointon Family Stadium; Manhattan, KS | L 8–12 | Ruhl (2–1) | Jasa (2–2) | None | 2,344 | 10–14 | – | Report |
| March 28 | B1G+ | No. 5 Oregon State* | | Haymarket Park | W 7–3 | Walsh (3–4) | Seguera (4–1) | Christo (1) | 6,348 | 11–14 | – | Report |
| March 29 | B1G+ | No. 5 Oregon State* | | Haymarket Park | L 5–16^{7} | Whitney (3–2) | Horn (0–4) | None | 5,248 | 11–15 | – | Report |
| March 30 | B1G+ | No. 5 Oregon State* | | Haymarket Park | W 16–7^{8} | Broderick (2–0) | Mundt (1–1) | None | 4,671 | 12–15 | – | Report |

April (10–8)
| Date | TV | Opponent | Rank | Stadium | Score | Win | Loss | Save | Attendance | Overall | B1G | Source |
Salt Creek Series
| April 1 | B1G+ | Creighton* | | Haymarket Park | L 5–9 | Burke (2–1) | Nowaczyk (0–1) | Langrell (1) | 4,392 | 12–16 | – | Report |
| April 2 | | at Omaha* | | Tal Anderson Field; Omaha, NE | L (9–11) | Gainer (5–1) | Unger (0–1) | Meyer (2) | 1,344 | 12–17 | – | Report |
| April 4 | B1G+ | Rutgers | | Haymarket Park | W 8–5 | Walsh (4–4) | Ryan (1–1) | Broderick (5) | 4,553 | 13–17 | 3–7 | Report |
| April 5 | B1G+ | Rutgers | | Haymarket Park | W 10–5 | Worthley (2–0) | Mack (3–3) | None | 5,188 | 14–17 | 4–7 | Report |
| April 6 | B1G+ | Rutgers | | Haymarket Park | L 5–7 | Berglin (3–1) | Brockett (0–3) | Fithian (1) | 4,707 | 14–18 | 4–8 | Report |
| April 8 | B12N+ | at No. 22 Kansas* | | Hoglund Ballpark; Lawrence, KS | W 7–5 | Bender (1–0) | West (2–1) | Broderick (6) | 2,041 | 15–18 | 5-8 | |
Heroes Series
| April 11 | B1G+ | at Iowa | | Duane Banks Field; Iowa City, IA | L 0–1 | Obermueller (4–2) | Walsh (4–5) | Watts (2) | | 15–19 | 5–9 | |
| April 12 | B1G+ | at Iowa | | Duane Banks Field | L 6-11 | Hogue (2-1) | Broderick (2-1) | None | | 15-20 | 5-10 | |
| April 13 | B1G+ | at Iowa | | Duane Banks Field | W 6-4 | Casey (0-1) | Wright (1-1) | Broderick (7) | | 16-20 | 6-10 | |
Salt Creek Series
| April 15 | FS1 | at Creighton* | | Charles Schwab Field; Omaha, NE | W 6-3 | Bender (2-0) | Unga (0-1) | Broderick (8) | | 17-20 | – | |
| April 18 | B1G+ | Northwestern | | Haymarket Park | L 9-7 | Crawford (4-4) | Casey (1-1) | None | 4,832 | 17-21 | 6-11 | |
| April 19 | B1G+ | Northwestern | | Haymarket Park | W 14-4 | Horn (1-4) | Kouser (3-4) | None | | 18-21 | 7-11 | |
| April 19 | B1G+ | Northwestern | | Haymarket Park | W 5-2 | Brockett (1-3) | Forniss (1-2) | Broderick (9) | 5,824 | 19-21 | 8-11 | |
| April 22 | B1G+ | Kansas* | | Haymarket Park | L 0-4 | Trumper (4-0) | Timmerman (0-1) | None | 5,211 | 19-22 | – | |
| April 25 | B1G+ | at Maryland | | Turtle Smith Stadium; College Park, MD | L 5-12 | McCoy (4-2) | Walsh (4-6) | Hastings (1) | 968 | 19-23 | 8-12 | Report |
| April 26 | B1G+ | at Maryland | | Turtle Smith Stadium | W 7-2 | Horn (2-4) | McMannis (1-2) | None | 1233 | 20-23 | 8-12 | Report |
| April 27 | B1G+ | at Maryland | | Turtle Smith Stadium | W 21–5 | Brockett (2-3) | Johnson (1–3) | None | 962 | 21–23 | 9–12 | Report |
| April 29 | B1G+ | Kansas State* | | Haymarket Park | W 7–6 | Blachowicz (3–0) | Ruhl (2–2) | None | 4,998 | 22–23 | – | Report |

May (5–4)
| Date | TV | Opponent | Rank | Stadium | Score | Win | Loss | Save | Attendance | Overall | B1G | Source |
Broken Chair Series
| May 2 | B1G+ | Minnesota | | Haymarket Park | L 4–6 | Sundquist (3–1) | Broderick (2–2) | Rooney (1) | 5156 | 22–24 | 9–13 | Report |
| May 3 | B1G+ | Minnesota | | Haymarket Park | W 5–4 | Timmerman (1–1) | Whelan (0–2) | None | 6785 | 23–24 | 10–13 | Report |
| May 4 | B1G+ | Minnesota | | Haymarket Park | W 8–3 | Cleavinger (1–0) | Ryerse (0–3) | None | 5602 | 24–24 | 11–13 | Report |
Salt Creek Series
| May 6 | B1G+ | Creighton* | | Haymarket Park | L 7–8 | Koosman (6–3) | Walsh (4–7) | Langrell (1) | 5802 | 24–25 | | Report |
| May 9 | B1G+ | Michigan | | Haymarket Park | W 3–2 | Timmerman (2–1) | Barr (6–4) | Broderick (1) | 5804 | 25–25 | 12–13 | Report |
| May 10 | B1G+ | Michigan | | Haymarket Park | W 5–2 | Broderick (3–2) | Lally (4–4) | None | 5832 | 26–25 | 13–13 | Report |
| May 11 | B1G+ | Michigan | | Haymarket Park | L 1–3 | Rogers (5–2) | Christo (1–2) | None | 6044 | 26–26 | 13–14 | Report |
| May 15 | B1G+ | at Purdue | | Alexander Field; West Lafayette, IN | W 11–9 | Christo (2–2) | Doorn (4–6) | Broderick (1) | 1407 | 27–26 | 14–14 | Report |
| May 16 | B1G+ | at Purdue | | Alexander Field | L 4–5 | Milburn (3–5) | Worthley (2–1) | None | 1606 | 27–27 | 14–15 | Report |
| May 17 | B1G+ | at Purdue | | Alexander Field | W 14–2 | Brockett (3–2) | Storey (4–3) | None | 1807 | 28–27 | 15–15 | Report |

Postseason (5–2)

B1G tournament (4–0)
| Date | TV | Opponent | Rank | Stadium | Score | Win | Loss | Save | Attendance | Overall | Source |
|---|---|---|---|---|---|---|---|---|---|---|---|
| May 20 | | Michigan State | | Charles Schwab Field; Omaha, NE | W 5–4 | Broderick (4–2) | Pianto (0–1) | None | 2843 | 29–27 | Report |
| May 24 | | Oregon | | Charles Schwab Field | W 7–3 | Brockett (4–3) | Grinsell (9–3) | Walsh (1) | 8541 | 30–27 | Report |
| May 24 | | Penn State | | Charles Schwab Field | W 6–3 | Christo (3–2) | Van Ostenbridge (2–1) | Broderick (1) | 8541 | 31–27 | Report |
| May 25 | | UCLA | | Charles Schwab Field | W 5–0 | Horn (3–4) | Stump (6–1) | None | 15139 | 32–27 | Report |

NCAA tournament (1–2)
| Date | TV | Opponent | Rank | Stadium | Score | Win | Loss | Save | Attendance | Overall | Source |
|---|---|---|---|---|---|---|---|---|---|---|---|
| May 30 | ESPN+ | Oklahoma* | | Boshamer Stadium; Chapel Hill, NC | L 4–7 | Witherspoon (4–8) | Brockett (4–4) | Crooks (15) | 987 | 32–28 | Report |
| May 31 | ESPN+ | Holy Cross* | | Boshamer Stadium | W 4–1 | Horn (4–4) | Wywoda (9–3) | Broderick (13) | 897 | 33–28 | Report |
| June 1 | ESPN+ | Oklahoma* | | Boshamer Stadium | L 1–17 | Crossland (5–5) | Walsh (4–8) | None | 809 | 33–29 | Report |

Legend: = Win = Loss = Canceled
Bold =Nebraska team member * Non-conference game
Rankings are based on the team's current ranking in the D1Baseball poll.

== Rankings ==
Ranking movements Legend: ██ Increase in ranking ██ Decrease in ranking — = Not ranked RV = Received votes
| | Week | | | | | | | | | | | | | | | | | | |
| Poll | Pre | 1 | 2 | 3 | 4 | 5 | 6 | 7 | 8 | 9 | 10 | 11 | 12 | 13 | 14 | 15 | 16 | 17 | Final |
|---|---|---|---|---|---|---|---|---|---|---|---|---|---|---|---|---|---|---|---|
| Coaches' | | * | RV | — | — | — | — | — | — | — | — | — | — | — | — | — | | | |
| Baseball America | — | — | — | — | — | — | — | — | — | — | — | — | — | — | — | — | | | |
| NCBWA† | 24 | 22 | — | RV | RV | — | — | — | — | — | — | — | — | — | — | RV | | | |
| D1Baseball | 24 | 23 | — | — | — | — | — | — | — | — | — | — | — | — | — | — | | | |
| Perfect Game | — | — | — | — | — | — | — | — | — | — | — | — | — | — | — | — | | | |

† NCBWA ranks 30 teams in their preseason poll, but only ranks 25 teams weekly during the season.
* A new poll was not released for this week, so for comparison purposes, the previous week's ranking is inserted in this week's slot.
