= Garth Webb =

Founder of Juno Beach Centre

- Born: 1918; Calgary, Alberta
- Died: May 8, 2012 (aged 93–94); Burlington, Ontario
- Known for: Founding the Juno Beach Centre

Garth Webb (1918 – 8 May 2012) was a Canadian soldier who founded the Juno Beach Centre. Webb fought in World War II as a member of the 14th Field Regiment, Royal Canadian Artillery. He was awarded the Meritorious Service Cross and the Legion of Honour medal.

== Early life and military service ==
Webb was born in Calgary, Alberta in 1918. He was educated at Queen's University and graduated from the Canadian Officers' Training Corps in 1942. He was a lieutenant in the Canadian Army assigned to the 14th Field Regiment, Royal Canadian Artillery. He fought on D-Day at the Juno Beach landings where he came ashore at Bernières-sur-Mer with his Priest 105 mm self-propelled howitzer.

== Post-war career and advocacy ==
After the war, Webb completed a degree in commerce at Queen's University and moved to Toronto where he was a real estate appraiser.

Visiting the beaches of Normandy during the commemoration of the 50th anniversary of the Normandy Landings, Webb noticed that there was very little to mark the efforts of Canadian troops. This spurred him to lead an effort to build the Juno Beach Centre, a museum and education centre at Courseulles-sur-Mer, France. Webb was awarded the Meritorious Service Cross from Canada (2003) and the Legion of Honour medal from France (2005) for finding the Juno Beach Centre. In the late 20th century, Webb became increasingly concerned that Canada's role in the D-Day landings was being overlooked in public memory. This concern led him to initiate efforts to build a memorial and education centre dedicated to the Canadian soldiers who fought on Juno Beach.

== The Juno Beach Centre ==
Webb's vision for the Juno Beach Centre became a reality in 2003 when the museum opened its doors in Courseulles-sur-Mer, France, on the very site where Canadian troops had landed during the D-Day invasion. Webb played a central role in fundraising and advocating for the project, working alongside veterans, historians, and the Canadian government to ensure its success. The Juno Beach Centre serves as a museum, research facility, and gathering place for veterans and their families, providing insight into Canada's contributions to the Allied war effort.

== Legacy and death ==
Webb died on 8 May 2012 in Burlington, Ontario. The Garth Webb Secondary School in Oakville, Ontario, was named in his honor in 2012, further solidifying his impact on Canadian remembrance and education.

== Honors ==
- Officer of the Order of Canada (OC)
- Recipient of the French Legion of Honour
- Founder of the Juno Beach Centre
