= JB Shuck =

American baseball player (born 1987)

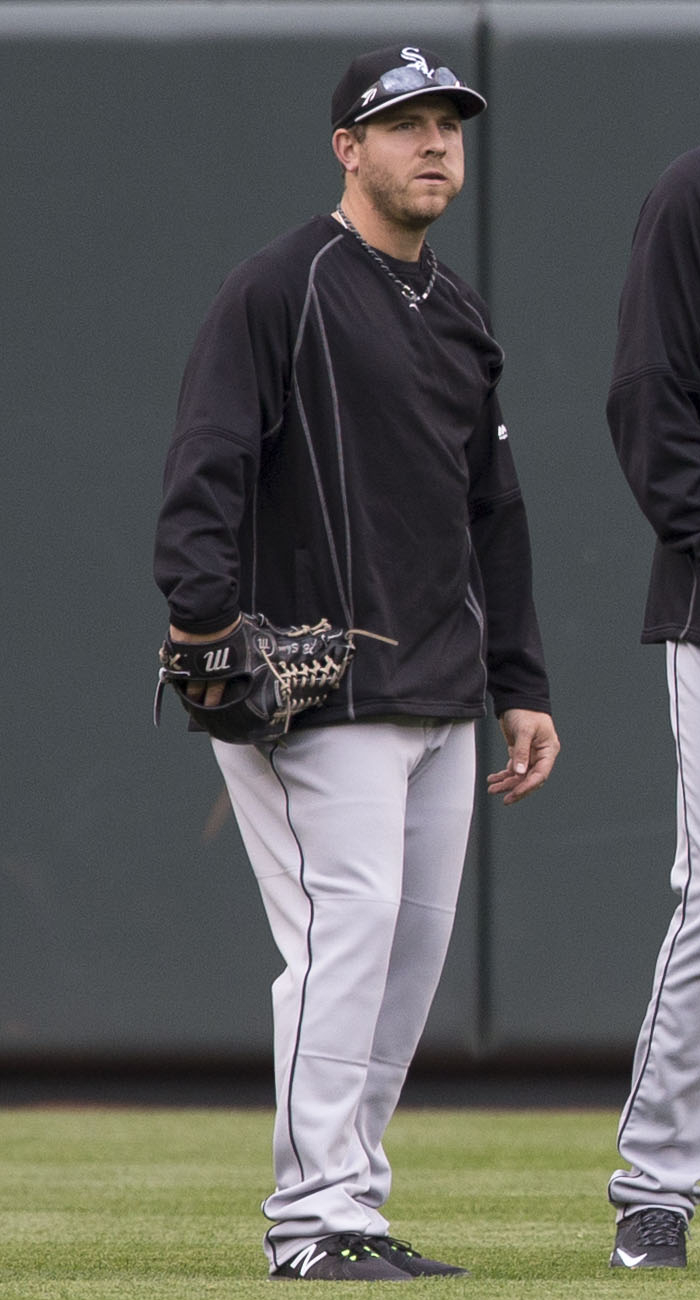
- Shuck with the Chicago White Sox
- Outfielder
- Born: June 18, 1987 (age 39); Westerville, Ohio, U.S.
- Batted: Left Threw: Left

MLB debut
- August 5, 2011, for the Houston Astros

Last MLB appearance
- May 3, 2019, for the Pittsburgh Pirates

MLB statistics
- Batting average: .243
- Home runs: 8
- Runs batted in: 86
- Stats at Baseball Reference

Teams
- Houston Astros (2011); Los Angeles Angels of Anaheim (2013–2014); Cleveland Indians (2014); Chicago White Sox (2015–2016); Miami Marlins (2018); Pittsburgh Pirates (2019)

Jack Burdett Shuck III (born June 18, 1987) is an American former professional baseball outfielder. He played in Major League Baseball (MLB) for the Houston Astros, Los Angeles Angels, Cleveland Indians, Chicago White Sox, Miami Marlins, and Pittsburgh Pirates.

== Amateur career ==
Born in Westerville, Ohio, and raised in Galion, Shuck went to Galion High School. At Galion High, he batted .576 with a 1.650 OPS and had a 1.12 ERA with 134 strikeouts in 69 innings, and also lettered in basketball. Shuck went to Ohio State University where in 2006, as a freshman, he batted .325 in 123 AB as a hitter, and led the team in ERA as a pitcher. He was named the Big Ten Conference Freshman of the Year. In 2007, he hit .382 and had a 4.89 ERA. After the 2007 season, he played collegiate summer baseball with the Cotuit Kettleers of the Cape Cod Baseball League. In 2008, he hit .356 and had a 4.29 ERA and led the team in strikeouts. Shuck was drafted in the sixth round, 182nd overall, by the Houston Astros as an outfielder in the 2008 MLB draft.

== Professional career ==
=== Houston Astros ===
==== Minor leagues ====
Shuck played 2008 with Short-Season Tri-City, where he hit .300 and was a New York–Penn League All-Star. He played with High-A Lancaster in 2009, where he hit .315 with 18 SB and 36 RBI. He started 2010 with Double-A Corpus Christi, where he was a Texas League All-Star, hitting .298 with 28 RBI in 101 games before earning a promotion to Triple-A Round Rock. After the Astros and the Texas Rangers switched affiliates, Shuck started 2011 with Oklahoma City, where he was a Pacific Coast League All-Star, with a .401 OBP in 101 games before earning a promotion.

==== Major leagues ====
On August 5, 2011, Shuck was called up to the majors to replace Luis Durango, who was designated for assignment. In his first major league at bat, he hit a single off Milwaukee Brewers' Yovani Gallardo and stole second. In 37 games with the Astros, Shuck hit .272/.359/.321 with 3 RBIs and 2 stolen bases.

Shuck spent all of 2012 with Oklahoma City, hitting .298/.374/.352 in 115 games with 33 RBI. On November 3, Shuck elected to become a free agent after refusing outright minor league assignment.

=== Los Angeles Angels of Anaheim ===
Shuck signed a minor league contract with the Los Angeles Angels of Anaheim as a free agent on November 14, 2012, that included an invitation to spring training.

Shuck made the major league roster to start the 2013 season as the starter in left field. On July 29, 2013, Shuck hit his first career home run against the Texas Rangers. For the season, Shuck appeared in 129 games for the Angels, hitting .293/.331/.366 with 2 home runs and 39 RBIs. Following the season, Shuck received four votes in American League Rookie of the Year voting, finishing in fifth place.

He appeared in 22 games for the Angels in 2014 and hit .167, but he had spent most of the season with the Triple–A Salt Lake Bees, where he hit .320.

=== Cleveland Indians ===
On September 5, 2014, Shuck was traded to the Cleveland Indians in exchange for cash considerations. In 16 appearances for the Indians, Shuck went 2-for-26 (.077).

=== Chicago White Sox ===
On November 3, 2014, Shuck was claimed off waivers by Chicago White Sox. He made 79 appearances for the White Sox during the 2015 season, batting .266/.340/.350 with 15 RBI and seven stolen bases.

On June 8, 2016, Shuck pitched for the White Sox against the Washington Nationals in the top of the 9th inning in an 11–0 game. He allowed one hit, one run, did not walk or strike out anyone, but he got Bryce Harper to ground out. In 80 games for Chicago in 2016, Shuck batted .205/.248/.299 with four home runs and 14 RBI. He was removed from the 40–man roster and sent outright to the Triple–A Charlotte Knights on November 2, 2016. However, Shuck rejected the assignment in lieu of free agency.

=== Minnesota Twins ===
On December 17, 2016, Shuck signed a minor league contract with the Minnesota Twins organization. He played in 123 games for the Triple–A Rochester Red Wings in 2017, hitting .259/.325/.368 with 4 home runs and 37 RBI. Shuck elected free agency following the season on November 6.

=== Miami Marlins ===
On November 24, 2017, Shuck signed a minor league contract with the Miami Marlins. On April 13, 2018, Shuck was selected to the major league roster to take the roster spot of Braxton Lee, who was optioned to Triple–A. That night, Shuck went 4–for–4 against the Pittsburgh Pirates in his first MLB game since 2016. He was designated for assignment on July 5, after Garrett Cooper was activated off of the disabled list. In 70 games, he had hit .192/.255/.231 with 4 RBI and 2 stolen bases. Shuck cleared waivers and was sent outright to the Triple–A New Orleans Baby Cakes on July 9. He declared free agency on October 2.

=== Pittsburgh Pirates ===
Shuck signed a minor league deal with the Pittsburgh Pirates on January 30, 2019. On March 28, it was announced Shuck had made the Opening Day roster. In 27 games for the Pirates, Shuck hit .213/.339/.255 with no home runs, 2 RBI, and 1 stolen base. On May 4, Shuck was designated for assignment after Dovydas Neverauskas was recalled from Triple–A. He cleared waivers and was sent outright to the Triple–A Indianapolis Indians on May 8. On May 18, it was announced that Shuck would attempt to become a two-way player, splitting his time between pitcher and outfielder. He elected free agency on October 1.

=== Washington Nationals ===
On February 12, 2020, Shuck signed a minor league deal with the Washington Nationals organization. Shuck did not play in a game in 2020 due to the cancellation of the minor league season because of the COVID-19 pandemic. He was released by Washington on May 30.

== Personal life ==
Shuck is the only son of Jack II and Cindy Sheffer. He has one sister, Amanda.

On November 9, 2013, Shuck married Christine Anne Cimino at the University of Notre Dame, making him the second professional baseball player to marry into the Cimino family: Christine's sister, Mary Catherine Cimino, is married to pitcher Mark Melancon.
