= Big Ten Conference Baseball Freshman of the Year =

Big Ten Conference Freshman of the Year
- Awarded for: the most outstanding freshman player in the Big Ten Conference
- Country: United States

History
- First award: 1988
- Most recent: Drew Grego, Nebraska

The Big Ten Conference Freshman of the Year is an annual college baseball award presented to the Big Ten Conference's most outstanding freshman player. The award was first given following the 1988 season to Dan Wilson of Minnesota.

== Key ==
*	Awarded a College National Player of the Year award: the Dick Howser Trophy or the Golden Spikes Award
†	Major League Baseball All-Star
‡	Member of the National Baseball Hall of Fame

== Winners ==
Season	Player	School	Position	Reference
1988	Dan Wilson	Minnesota	C	
1989	Bubba Smith	Illinois	1B/P	
1990	Scott Klingenbeck	Ohio State	P	
1991	Mark Merila	Minnesota	2B	
1992	Matt Beaumont	Ohio State	P	
1993	Scott Weaver	Michigan	OF	
1994	C. J. Thieleke	Iowa	2B	
1995	Dan Seimetz	Ohio State	DH	
1996	Jason Alcaraz	Michigan	OF	
1997	Keith Batchelder	Northwestern	OF	
1998	Jeremy Kurella	Northwestern	SS	
1999	Mike Campo	Penn State	CF	
2000	Nick Swisher†	Ohio State	1B	
2001	Doug Deeds	Ohio State	DH	
2002	Scott Lewis	Ohio State	P	
2003	Glen Perkins	Minnesota	P	
2004	Jacob Howell	Ohio State	OF	
2005	Ryan Sontag	Michigan State	OF	
2006	J. B. Shuck	Ohio State	P	
2007	Matt Bischoff	Purdue	P	
2008	Eric Jokisch	Northwestern	P	
2009	Alex Dickerson	Indiana	DH	
2010	Ryan Jones	Michigan State	2B	
2011	Josh Dezse	Ohio State	UT	
2012	Sam Travis	Indiana	1B	
2013	Kevin Duchene	Illinois	P	
2014	Tanner Tully	Ohio State	P	
2015	Jake Bivens	Michigan	2B	
2016	Chad Luensmann	Nebraska	P	
2017	Tyler Blohm	Maryland	P	
2018	Patrick Fredrickson	Minnesota	P	
2019	Maxwell Costes	Maryland	1B	
2021	Max Anderson	Nebraska	3B	
2022	Keaton Anthony	Iowa	OF	
2023	Devin Taylor	Indiana	OF	
2024	Luke Gaffney	Purdue	1B	
2025	Jake Hanley	Indiana	1B	
2026	Drew Grego	Nebraska	OF	

== Winners by school ==
School (year joined)	Winners	Years
Ohio State (1912)	10	1990, 1992, 1995, 2000, 2001, 2002, 2004, 2006, 2011, 2014
Indiana (1900)	4	2009, 2012, 2023, 2025
Minnesota (1896)	4	1988, 1991, 2003, 2018
Indiana (1900)	3	2009, 2012, 2023
Michigan (1896)	3	1993, 1996, 2015
Nebraska (2011)	3	2016, 2021, 2026
Northwestern (1896)	3	1997, 1998, 2008
Illinois (1896)	2	1989, 2013
Iowa (1900)	2	1994, 2022
Maryland (2014)	2	2017, 2019
Michigan State (1953)	2	2005, 2010
Purdue (1896)	2	2007, 2024
Penn State (1993)	1	1999
Rutgers (2014)	0	—
Oregon (2024)	0	—
UCLA (2024)	0	—
USC (2024)	0	—
Washington (2024)	0	—
Wisconsin (1896)^{a}	0	—

== Notes ==
^{a} Wisconsin discontinued its baseball program after the 1991 season.
