= Garth Webb Secondary School =

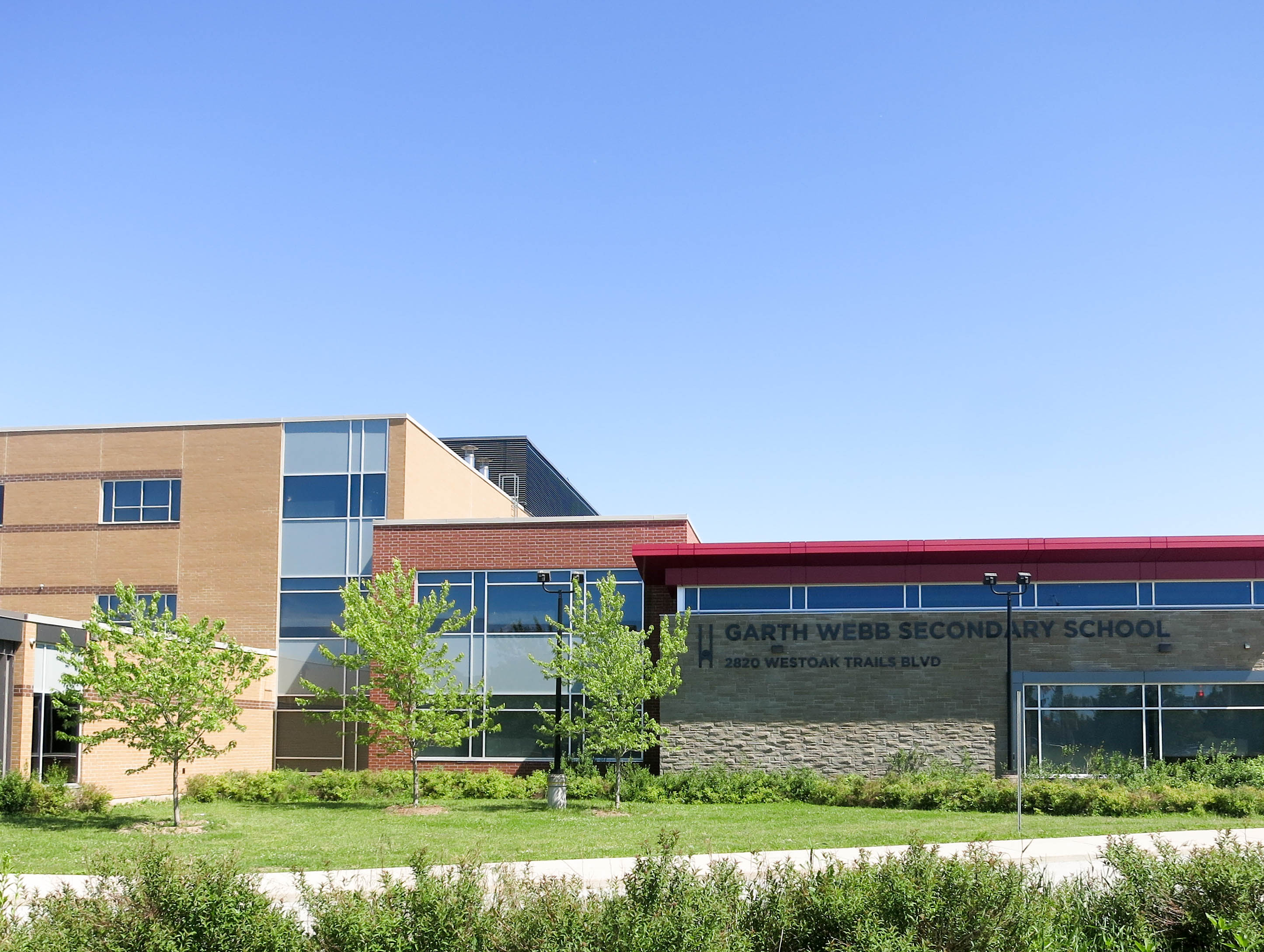

Location
- 2820 West Oak Trails Boulevard; Oakville, Ontario, L6M 4W2; Canada; 43.434395°N 79.754522°W

Information
- School type: Public, High school
- Founded: September 2012
- School board: Halton District School Board
- Superintendent: Jennie Petko
- Area trustee: Joanna Oliver
- School Council - Chair: Craig Lemon
- School Council - Treasurer: Anshu Mahajan
- School Council - Secretary: TBA
- Administrator: Lori Salisbury
- Principal: Luisa Botelho
- Teaching staff: 109
- Grades: 9-12(+)
- Enrolment: 1,675 (2024–2025)
- Language: English
- Colour
- Team name: Chargers
- Website: hdsb.ca/gws

Garth Webb Secondary School is a school in western Oakville, Ontario, Canada for students in grades 9–12. It is part of the Halton District School Board and serves the communities of West Oak Trails and Bronte Creek. The school is named after D-Day veteran Garth Webb, who founded the Juno Beach Centre.

== Layout ==
Garth Webb Secondary School has 3 floors, each holding a few subjects. The first floor has all the Technology courses, Physical Education, Culinary Education, as well as Drama and Music courses. The second floor has Languages, Social Studies and Humanities, Visual Arts and Photography, and Canadian and World studies. The third floor hosts Mathematics, Sciences, and Business Studies classes. The school is split into multiple departments, namely: the mathematics office, science office, languages office, business studies office, and technology studies office.

== Initiatives ==
Garth Webb Secondary School is noted for several academic and extracurricular initiatives. The school hosts Team 5409, the Chargers Robotics team, which competes in the international FIRST Robotics Competition and engages in engineering, design, and community outreach projects. The team also qualified to compete at the international level in 2023 and 2024. Garth Webb also offers a French Immersion program and, beginning in 2024, was designated to host a secondary gifted cluster, grouping students identified as intellectually gifted in core academic subjects to extend their learning beyond the standard curriculum.

Reflecting its namesake's legacy, the school places emphasis on remembrance education. Every year, Grade 10 Canadian History students participate in the Lest We Forget project, researching and presenting the histories of Canadian service members, and graduates are eligible for scholarships sponsored by the Juno Beach Centre.

In addition, students at Garth Webb developed and maintain the Math Contest Repository, an online platform created in 2023 by Grade 11 students that compiles problems and solutions from Canadian and American mathematics contests. The platform is used by students across Canada and aims to help students prepare for high school competitions hosted by the Centre for Education in Mathematics and Computing and the American Mathematical Society.

== See also ==
- Education in Ontario
- List of secondary schools in Ontario
