= 2025 Purdue Boilermakers baseball team =

American college baseball season

2025 Purdue Boilermakers baseball
- Conference: Big Ten Conference
- Record: 31–23 (11–19 B1G)
- Head coach: Greg Goff (6th season)
- Assistant coach: Barrett Serrato (1st season)
- Hitting coach: Greg Lovelady (1st season)
- Pitching coach: Josh Newman (2nd season)
- Home stadium: Alexander Field

2025 Big Ten Conference baseball standings
	Conf.						Overall
Team	W		L		T	PCT	W		L		T	PCT
No. 5 Oregon ‍†‍‍^{y}	22	–	8	–	0	.733	42	–	16	–	0	.724
No. 13 UCLA ‍†‍‍^{y}	22	–	8	–	0	.733	48	–	16	–	0	.750
Iowa ‍‍‍	21	–	9	–	0	.700	33	–	22	–	1	.598
USC ‍‍‍^{y}	18	–	12	–	0	.600	37	–	23	–	0	.617
Washington ‍‍‍	17	–	13	–	0	.567	29	–	28	–	0	.509
Indiana ‍‍‍	16	–	14	–	0	.533	32	–	24	–	0	.571
Michigan ‍‍‍	16	–	14	–	0	.533	33	–	23	–	0	.589
Nebraska ‍‍‡‍^{y}	15	–	15	–	0	.500	33	–	29	–	0	.532
Penn State ‍‍‍	15	–	15	–	0	.500	33	–	23	–	0	.589
Rutgers ‍‍‍	15	–	15	–	0	.500	29	–	28	–	0	.509
Illinois ‍‍‍	14	–	16	–	0	.467	30	–	24	–	0	.556
Michigan State ‍‍‍	13	–	17	–	0	.433	28	–	27	–	0	.509
Northwestern ‍‍‍	13	–	17	–	0	.433	25	–	27	–	0	.481
Maryland ‍‍‍	12	–	18	–	0	.400	27	–	29	–	0	.482
Purdue ‍‍‍	11	–	19	–	0	.367	31	–	23	–	0	.574
Minnesota ‍‍‍	10	–	20	–	0	.333	24	–	28	–	0	.462
Ohio State ‍‍‍	5	–	25	–	0	.167	13	–	37	–	0	.260
† – Conference champion ‡ – Tournament champion y – Invited to the NCAA tournament As of June 2, 2025; Rankings from D1Baseball

The 2025 Purdue Boilermakers baseball team is a baseball team that represents Purdue University in the 2025 NCAA Division I baseball season. The Boilermakers are members of the Big Ten Conference and play their home games at Alexander Field in West Lafayette, Indiana. They are led by sixth-year head coach Greg Goff.

== Previous season ==
The Boilermakers finished the 2024 NCAA Division I baseball season 33–24 overall (13–11 conference) and sixth place in the conference standings, qualifying for the 2024 Big Ten baseball tournament, where they went 0–2, ending their season.

== Roster ==
2025 Purdue Boilermakers baseball team
Players
Coaches

#	Pos.	Name	B/T	Height	Weight	Year	Previous school	Home town
1	OF	Albert Choi	R/R	6 ft 0 in (1.83 m)	190 lb (86 kg)	RS Sr	NJIT	Downingtown, Pennsylvania
2	INF	Ty Gill	L/R	6 ft 2 in (1.88 m)	155 lb (70 kg)	Sr	Valparaiso H. S.	Valparaiso, Indiana
3	OF	Eli Anderson	L/R	6 ft 0 in (1.83 m)	170 lb (77 kg)	RS Jr	North Iowa Area C.C.	Fairmont, Minnesota
4	OF	Brandon Rogers	R/R	5 ft 11 in (1.8 m)	205 lb (93 kg)	RS Jr	Arizona	Chicago, Illinois
5	OF	Brody Chrisman	L/R	6 ft 3 in (1.91 m)	205 lb (93 kg)	RS So	Zionsville Community H. S.	Zionsville, Indiana
6	INF	James Novakovic	L/R	6 ft 1 in (1.85 m)	190 lb (86 kg)	Fr	New Trier H. S.	Wilmette, Illinois
7	INF	Camden Gasser	L/R	5 ft 10 in (1.78 m)	160 lb (73 kg)	RS Jr	Michigan	Huntingburg, Indiana
8	INF	Brandon Anderson	L/R	6 ft 4 in (1.93 m)	225 lb (102 kg)	Sr	Louisville	Richmond, Kentucky
10	INF	Logan Sutter	R/R	6 ft 1 in (1.85 m)	215 lb (98 kg)	Sr	Folsom Lake College	Loomis, California
11	RHP	Lance Lauve	R/R	5 ft 11 in (1.8 m)	205 lb (93 kg)	Sr	Southeastern Louisiana	Madisonville, Louisiana
13	UTL	Sergio DeCello	R/R	5 ft 10 in (1.78 m)	200 lb (91 kg)	RS Jr	Arizona Western College	Hamilton, Ohio
14	INF	Breck Nowik	R/R	6 ft 3 in (1.91 m)	220 lb (100 kg)	RS Sr	UIC	Lake Forest, Illinois
15	C	Will Briggs	R/R	5 ft 11 in (1.8 m)	185 lb (84 kg)	RS Fr	Academy of Holy Angels	Shakopee, Minnesota
16	C	Houston Russell	R/R	6 ft 1 in (1.85 m)	210 lb (95 kg)	RS Jr	Oklahoma	Midwest City, Oklahoma
17	INF	Lukas Cook	R/R	6 ft 3 in (1.91 m)	200 lb (91 kg)	RS Sr	Dyersburg State C.C.	Knoxville, Tennessee
18	RHP	Joe Trenerry	R/R	6 ft 4 in (1.93 m)	225 lb (102 kg)	Fr	Penn H.S.	Granger, Indiana
19	OF	Avery Moore	R/R	6 ft 2 in (1.88 m)	200 lb (91 kg)	Jr	Southeast Junior College	Omaha, Nebraska
20	INF	Aaron Manias	L/R	6 ft 2 in (1.88 m)	210 lb (95 kg)	RS Jr	Nebraska	Uxbridge, Ontario
21	INF	C. J. Raymond	L/L	6 ft 3 in (1.91 m)	240 lb (109 kg)	Sr	Western Michigan	Indianapolis, Indiana
22	LHP	Easton Storey	L/L	5 ft 11 in (1.8 m)	195 lb (88 kg)	So	Brighton H.S.	Brighton, Michigan
23	UTL	Amir Gray	L/R	6 ft 1 in (1.85 m)	200 lb (91 kg)	RS Fr	Brother Rice H.S.	South Holland, Illinois
25	RHP	Brayden Olson	R/R	6 ft 2 in (1.88 m)	205 lb (93 kg)	So	St. Croix Falls H.S.	St. Croix Falls, Wisconsin
26	RHP	Cole Van Assen	R/R	6 ft 3 in (1.91 m)	205 lb (93 kg)	So	Brother Rice H.S.	Tinley Park, Illinois
27	RHP	Nick Kolze	R/R	6 ft 3 in (1.91 m)	205 lb (93 kg)	Jr	Heartland C.C.	Romeoville, Illinois
28	RHP	Enas Hayden	R/R	6 ft 3 in (1.91 m)	210 lb (95 kg)	Sr	Purdue Fort Wayne	Indianapolis, Indiana
29	RHP	Gavin Beuter	R/R	6 ft 4 in (1.93 m)	210 lb (95 kg)	Jr	Kellogg C.C.	Three Rivers, Michigan
30	RHP	Maclane Finley	R/R	6 ft 0 in (1.83 m)	185 lb (84 kg)	Jr	Kansas City Kansas C.C.	Topeka, Kansas
31	LHP	Michael Vallone	L/L	6 ft 0 in (1.83 m)	175 lb (79 kg)	RS Sr	DePauw	Forest Lake, Illinois
33	RHP	Austin Klug	R/R	6 ft 4 in (1.93 m)	210 lb (95 kg)	Jr	North Iowa Area C.C.	Caledonia, Minnesota
34	UTL	Corbin Malott	R/R	6 ft 1 in (1.85 m)	180 lb (82 kg)	RS So	New Castle H. S.	New Castle, Indiana
35	RHP	Matthew Tarr	R/R	6 ft 2 in (1.88 m)	200 lb (91 kg)	Jr	John A. Logan College	North Aurora, Illinois
36	RHP	Carter Doorn	R/R	6 ft 3 in (1.91 m)	175 lb (79 kg)	Sr	Lake Central H. S.	Schererville, Indiana
37	LHP	Isaac Milburn	L/L	6 ft 0 in (1.83 m)	190 lb (86 kg)	RS Sr	Eastern Kentucky	Lexington, Kentucky
38	RHP	Evan Schweizer	R/R	6 ft 5 in (1.96 m)	210 lb (95 kg)	Fr	Garth Webb Secondary School	Oakville, Ontario, Canada
40	RHP	Barron Sawyer	R/R	6 ft 6 in (1.98 m)	235 lb (107 kg)	Jr	Northeast Texas C.C.	Abbeville, Louisiana
41	RHP	Gabe Watson	R/R	5 ft 10 in (1.78 m)	185 lb (84 kg)	Jr	Amarillo College	Hewitt, Texas
42	LHP	Justin Guiliano	R/L	6 ft 4 in (1.93 m)	210 lb (95 kg)	RS Sr	Canisius	Ellenville, New York
43	RHP	Avery Cook	R/R	6 ft 6 in (1.98 m)	235 lb (107 kg)	RS Sr	St. John's	Utica, New York
44	OF	Keenan Spence	R/R	6 ft 5 in (1.96 m)	230 lb (104 kg)	Sr	Howard College	Caroline Springs, Victoria, Australia
48	RHP	Matthew Totten	R/R	6 ft 3 in (1.91 m)	190 lb (86 kg)	Fr	Prior Lake H.S.	Prior Lake, Minnesota
50	RHP	Kale Wemer	R/R	6 ft 1 in (1.85 m)	210 lb (95 kg)	Fr	Crawfordsville H.S.	Crawfordsville, Indiana
52	RHP	Chris Gallagher	R/R	6 ft 0 in (1.83 m)	185 lb (84 kg)	Sr	Wright State	Indianapolis, Indiana
53	LHP	Luke Reasor	L/L	6 ft 3 in (1.91 m)	190 lb (86 kg)	Fr	Brecksville–Broadview Heights H.S.	Northfield, Ohio
55	C	Thomas Lynch	L/R	6 ft 1 in (1.85 m)	215 lb (98 kg)	Fr	Reitz Memorial H.S.	Evansville, Indiana

Head coach

Greg Goff

Assistant coach(es)

Barrett Serrato

Hitting coach(es)

Greg Lovelady

Pitching coach(es)

Josh Newman

Legend

- (C) Team captain
- (S) Suspended
- (I) Ineligible
- Injured
- Current redshirt

Roster
Last update: February 14, 2025

== Schedule ==
2025 Purdue Boilermakers baseball game log (31–23)
Regular season (31–23)
February (9–0)

#	Date	Rank	Opponent	Site/Stadium	Score	Win	Loss	Save	Attendance	Overall Record	B1G Record
1	February 14		vs Stephen F. Austin	Constellation Field • Sugar Land, Texas	4–1	Vallone (1–0)	Tronson (0–1)	Cook (1)	331	1–0	–
2	February 14		vs Stephen F. Austin	Constellation Field • Sugar Land, Texas	4–2	Guiliano (1–0)	Zeplin (0–1)	Cook (2)	331	2–0	–
3	February 15		vs Stephen F. Austin	Constellation Field • Sugar Land, Texas	14–2	Storey (1–0)	Nickerson (0–1)	None	288	3–0	–
4	February 16		vs Stephen F. Austin	Constellation Field • Sugar Land, Texas	16–12	Olson (1–0)	Balmaceda (0–1)	None	442	4–0	–
5	February 21		vs Niagara	Ting Stadium • Holly Springs, North Carolina	6–4	Doorn (1–0)	Wheaton (0–2)	Cook (3)	273	5–0	–
6	February 22		vs Niagara	Ting Stadium • Holly Springs, North Carolina	16–4	Hayden (1–0)	Wilde (0–1)	None	377	6–0	–
7	February 22		vs Niagara	Ting Stadium • Holly Springs, North Carolina	9–0	Storey (2–0)	DelVecchio (0–2)	Beuter (1)	377	7–0	–
8	February 23		vs Niagara	Ting Stadium • Holly Springs, North Carolina	11–1	Olson (2–0)	Bennett (0–2)	None	488	8–0	–
9	February 28		vs Akron	Ting Stadium • Holly Springs, North Carolina	5–0	Doorn (2–0)	Schaeffer (0–2)	Vallone (1)	411	9–0	–

March (11–7)

#	Date	Rank	Opponent	Site/Stadium	Score	Win	Loss	Save	Attendance	Overall Record	B1G Record
10	March 1		vs Akron	Ting Stadium • Holly Springs, North Carolina	13–3^{7}	Beuter (1–0)	Tourney (0–1)	None	688	10–0	–
11	March 1		vs Akron	Ting Stadium • Holly Springs, North Carolina	9–10^{11}	Anservitz (1–0)	Olson (2–1)	None	688	10–1	–
12	March 2		vs Akron	Ting Stadium • Holly Springs, North Carolina	14–4^{8}	Gallagher (1–0)	Vandegrif (0–1)	None	332	11–1	–
13	March 4		at Indiana State	Bob Warn Field at Sycamore Stadium • Terre Haute, Indiana	14–4^{8}	Bueter (2–0)	Morris (1–2)	None	567	12–1	–
14	March 7		at Minnesota	U.S. Bank Stadium • Minneapolis, Minnesota	6–3	Doorn (3–0)	Selvig (1–2)	None	–	13–1	1–0
15	March 8		at Minnesota	U.S. Bank Stadium • Minneapolis, Minnesota	11–6	Hayden (2–0)	Whelan (0–1)	Van Assen (1)	–	14–1	2–0
16	March 9		at Minnesota	U.S. Bank Stadium • Minneapolis, Minnesota	8–10	Sperry (2–0)	Milburn (0–1)	Clausen (1)	–	14–2	2–1
17	March 12		Butler	Alexander Field • West Lafayette, Indiana	10–1	Van Assen (1–0)	Griffiths (0–2)	None	1,413	15–2	2–1
18	March 14		UIC	Alexander Field • West Lafayette, Indiana	7–1	Doorn (4–0)	Schueler (0–5)	None	1,287	16–2	2–1
19	March 15		UIC	Alexander Field • West Lafayette, Indiana	9–3	Milburn (1–1)	Millsap (0–2)	None	1,203	17–2	2–1
–	March 16		UIC	Alexander Field • West Lafayette, Indiana	Game cancelled						
20	March 18		Milwaukee	Alexander Field • West Lafayette, Indiana	12–8	Van Assen (2–0)	Deleskiewicz (0–2)	Cook (4)	1,203	18–2	2–1
21	March 21		Michigan	Alexander Field • West Lafayette, Indiana	3–13^{7}	Lally (2–1)	Doorn (4–1)	None	1,220	18–3	2–2
22	March 22		Michigan	Alexander Field • West Lafayette, Indiana	9–6	Cook (1–0)	Debiec (0–1)	None	1,360	19–3	3–2
23	March 22		Michigan	Alexander Field • West Lafayette, Indiana	9–12	Barr (2–2)	Van Assen (2–1)	Rogers (5)	1,360	19–4	3–3
24	March 25		Valparaiso	Alexander Field • West Lafayette, Indiana	6–3	Milburn (2–1)	Kruse (0–2)	Cook (5)	1,126	20–4	–
25	March 28		No. 24 UCLA	Alexander Field • West Lafayette, Indiana	5–8	DelVecchio (1–3)	Doorn (4–2)	Lee (4)	1,444	20–5	3–4
26	March 29		No. 24 UCLA	Alexander Field • West Lafayette, Indiana	12–13	May (4–1)	Milburn (2–2)	O'Connor (1)	1,350	20–6	3–5
27	March 30		No. 24 UCLA	Alexander Field • West Lafayette, Indiana	3–16^{8}	Stump (3–0)	Van Assen (2–2)	None	1,227	20–7	3–6

April (6–11)

#	Date	Rank	Opponent	Site/Stadium	Score	Win	Loss	Save	Attendance	Overall Record	B1G Record
28	April 2		Northern Illinois	Alexander Field • West Lafayette, Indiana	1–2	Ruh (1–2)	Finley (0–1)	Cihocki (3)	1,065	20–8	3–6
29	April 4		at Washington	Husky Ballpark • Seattle, Washington	1–8	Banks (3–2)	Doorn (4–3)	None	1,204	20–9	3–7
30	April 5		at Washington	Husky Ballpark • Seattle, Washington	4–5	Thomas (3–2)	Milburn (2–3)	Yeager (1)	1,204	20–10	3–8
31	April 6		at Washington	Husky Ballpark • Seattle, Washington	3–5	McAdams (2–2)	Cook (1–1)	None	1,082	20–11	3–9
32	April 8		Indiana State	Alexander Field • West Lafayette, Indiana	8–9^{10}	Brooks (3–2)	Milburn (2–4)	None	1,074	20–12	3–9
33	April 11		Rutgers	Alexander Field • West Lafayette, Indiana	2–1	Vallone (2–0)	Mack (3–4)	Cook (6)	1,340	21–12	4–9
34	April 12		Rutgers	Alexander Field • West Lafayette, Indiana	10–5	Van Assen (3–2)	Berglin (3–2)	Cook (7)	1,838	22–12	5–9
35	April 13		Rutgers	Alexander Field • West Lafayette, Indiana	3–6	Shadek (1–3)	Beuter (1–1)	Fithian (1)	1,554	22–13	5–10
36	April 14		Arizona State	Alexander Field • West Lafayette, Indiana	8–6	Cook (2–1)	Halvorson (2–2)	None	1,197	23–13	5–10
37	April 18		at Penn State	Medlar Field • University Park, Pennsylvania	2–10	DeSanto (7–1)	Vallone (2–1)	None	1,456	23–14	5–11
38	April 19		at Penn State	Medlar Field • University Park, Pennsylvania	6–13	DeMell (3–2)	Milburn (2–5)	None	1,961	23–15	5–12
39	April 20		at Penn State	Medlar Field • University Park, Pennsylvania	11–8	Cook (3–1)	Loosli (4–1)	None	856	24–15	6–12
40	April 22		Austin Peay	Alexander Field • West Lafayette, Indiana	10–16	Cox (3–0)	Storey (2–1)	Applebey (1)	2,112	24–16	6–12
41	April 25		at Illinois	Illinois Field • Champaign, Illinois	4–6	Schmitt (4–2)	Doorn (4–4)	Bates (1)	541	24–17	6–13
42	April 26		at Illinois	Illinois Field • Champaign, Illinois	1–3	Hall (6–2)	Van Assen (3–3)	Bates (1)	1,221	24–18	6–14
43	April 27		at Illinois	Illinois Field • Champaign, Illinois	20–4	Vallone (3–1)	Hutchings (2–1)	None	986	25–18	7–14
44	April 29		Notre Dame	Alexander Field • West Lafayette, Indiana	11–5	Storey (3–1)	Heine (2–3)	Cook (1)	2,319	26–18	7–14

May (5–5)

#	Date	Rank	Opponent	Site/Stadium	Score	Win	Loss	Save	Attendance	Overall Record	B1G Record
45	May 2		Northwestern	Alexander Field • West Lafayette, Indiana	6–8	Grunkemeyer (2–0)	Cook (3–2)	Wade (1)	1,689	26–19	7–15
46	May 3		Northwestern	Alexander Field • West Lafayette, Indiana	5–3	Storey (4–1)	Kouser (4–5)	Cook (1)	2,081	27–19	8–15
47	May 3		Northwestern	Alexander Field • West Lafayette, Indiana	7–5	Van Assen (4–3)	Forniss (1–3)	Klug (1)	–	28–19	9–15
48	May 6		Ball State	Alexander Field • West Lafayette, Indiana	14–4^{7}	Trenerry (1–0)	Jacobson (1–1)	None	2,146	29–19	9–15
49	May 9		at Indiana	Bart Kaufman Field • Bloomington, Indiana	0–8	Kraft (3–1)	Doorn (4–5)	None	2,484	29–20	9–16
50	May 10		Indiana	Bart Kaufman Field • Bloomington, Indiana	5–1	Vallone (4–1)	Grable (4–3)	None	2,534	30–20	10–16
51	May 11		Indiana	Bart Kaufman Field • Bloomington, Indiana	4–14^{7}	Gilley (8–3)	Storey (4–2)	Decker-Petty (1)	2,264	30–21	10–17
–	May 13		at Ball State	Ball Diamond • Muncie, Indiana	Game cancelled						
52	May 15		Nebraska	Alexander Field • West Lafayette, Indiana	9–11	Christo (2–2)	Doorn (4–6)	Broderick (1)	1,407	30–22	10–18
53	May 16		Nebraska	Alexander Field • West Lafayette, Indiana	5–4	Milburn (3–5)	Worthley (2–1)	None	1,606	31–22	11–18
54	May 17		Nebraska	Alexander Field • West Lafayette, Indiana	2–14^{8}	Brockett (3–3)	Storey (4–3)	None	1,807	31–23	11–19

== Rankings ==
Ranking movements Legend: ██ Increase in ranking ██ Decrease in ranking — = Not ranked RV = Received votes
	Week																
Poll	Pre	1	2	3	4	5	6	7	8	9	10	11	12	13	14	15	Final
Coaches'	—	—*	—	—	RV	RV	—	—	—	—	—	—	—	—	—		
Baseball America	—	—	RV	RV	—	—	—	—	—	—	—	—	—	—	—		
NCBWA†	—	—	RV	—	RV	RV	RV	RV	RV	—	RV	RV	RV	—	—		
D1Baseball	—	—	—	—	—	—	—	—	—	—	—	—	—	—	—		
Perfect Game	—	—	—	—	—	—	—	—	—	—	—	—	—	—	—		

† NCBWA ranks 30 teams in their preseason poll, but only ranks 25 teams weekly during the season.
* A new poll was not released for this week, so for comparison purposes, the previous week's ranking is inserted in this week's slot.
