= 1987 Big Ten baseball tournament =

1987 Big Ten Conference baseball tournament
- Teams: 4
- Format: Double-elimination
- Finals site: Ray Fisher Stadium; Ann Arbor, MI
- Champions: Michigan (5th title)
- Winning coach: Bud Middaugh (5th title)
- MVP: Greg Everson (Michigan)

1987 Big Ten Conference baseball standings
	Conf.				Overall
Team	W		L	PCT	W		L	PCT
East
No. 23 Michigan ^{x}‍‍‡‍^{y}	13	–	3	.813	52	–	12	.813
Purdue ‍‍‍^{y}	10	–	6	.625	36	–	24	.600
Indiana ‍‍‍	7	–	9	.438	43	–	17	.717
Michigan State ‍‍‍	6	–	10	.375	34	–	20	.630
Ohio State ‍‍‍	4	–	12	.250	19	–	27	.413
West
Minnesota ^{x}‍‍‍	12	–	4	.750	36	–	25	.590
Iowa ‍‍‍	9	–	7	.563	29	–	28	.509
Illinois ‍‍‍	9	–	7	.563	32	–	24	.571
Northwestern ‍‍‍	5	–	11	.313	23	–	20	.535
Wisconsin ‍‍‍	5	–	11	.313	28	–	24	.538
x – Division champion ‡ – Tournament champion y – Invited to the NCAA tournament As of June 30, 1987; Rankings from Collegiate Baseball

The 1987 Big Ten Conference baseball tournament was held at Ray Fisher Stadium on the campus of the University of Michigan in Ann Arbor, Michigan, from May 15 through 19. The top two teams from the regular season in each division participated in the double-elimination tournament, the seventh annual tournament sponsored by the Big Ten Conference to determine the league champion. Michigan won their fifth tournament championship and earned the Big Ten Conference's automatic bid to the 1987 NCAA Division I baseball tournament

== Format and seeding ==
The 1987 tournament was a 4-team double-elimination tournament, with seeds determined by conference regular season winning percentage within each division. The top seed from each division played the second seed from the opposite division in the first round. Iowa claimed the second seed from the West by tiebreaker.

Team	W	L	PCT	GB	Seed
East Division
Michigan	13	3	.813	–	1E
Purdue	10	6	.625	3	2E
Indiana	7	9	.438	6	–
Michigan State	6	10	.375	6	–
Ohio State	4	12	.250	9	–
West Division
Minnesota	12	4	.750	–	1W
Iowa	9	7	.563	3	2W
Illinois	9	7	.563	3	–
Northwestern	5	11	.313	7	–
Wisconsin	5	11	.313	7	–

== Tournament ==
Upper round 1
1E	Michigan	4
2W	Iowa	9
1W	Minnesota	3
2E	Purdue	9
Lower round 1
1E	Michigan	9
1W	Minnesota	8

Upper final
2W	Iowa	0
2E	Purdue	4
Lower final
2W	Iowa	1
1E	Michigan	7

Final
2E	Purdue	2	2
1E	Michigan	5	4

== All-Tournament Team ==
The following players were named to the All-Tournament Team.

Pos	Name	School
P	Greg Everson	Michigan
P	Chris Lutz	Michigan
P	Andy Swain	Purdue
C	Darrin Campbell	Michigan
1B	Phil Price	Michigan
2B	Bob Gerhard	Purdue
SS	Arci Cianfrocco	Purdue
3B	Bill St. Peter	Michigan
OF	Jeff Allison	Purdue
OF	Jeff Durham	Michigan
OF	Luis Ramirez	Iowa
DH	Brett Roach	Purdue

=== Most Outstanding Player ===
Greg Everson was named Most Outstanding Player. McIntosh was an outfielder for Michigan.
