= Mark Merila =

Mark Merila (born November 9, 1971) is a scout for the San Diego Padres and a former professional baseball player.

== Amateur career ==
Merila was born in Litchfield, Minnesota, and attended University of Minnesota. While with the University of Minnesota, he played on the school's baseball team, and was named the Big Ten Conference Baseball Freshman of the Year in 1991 and Big Ten Conference Baseball Player of the Year in 1994. In 1992, he played collegiate summer baseball with the Hyannis Mets of the Cape Cod Baseball League. Merila broke Minnesota single-season and career records for batting average with a .452 average in 1994 and a .393 career average. He was also selected an All-American second baseman in 1994.

Near the end of his senior year at Minnesota, Merila was diagnosed with a brain tumor, which was treated with radiation therapy. He was drafted by Major League Baseball teams twice - first, he was taken in the 10th round of the 1993 draft, though he refused to sign. He was next taken by the Padres in the 33rd round of the 1994 draft, beginning his professional career that year.

== Professional career ==
He played for the Spokane Indians in 1994, hitting .253 in 54 games. In 1995, he played for the Idaho Falls Braves, hitting .284 in 56 games. Overall, he hit .268 in his two-year career. He also pitched in two games, posting a 32.40 ERA. He retired from professional baseball due to a brain tumor. Following his playing career, he became the Padres' bullpen catcher. After the tumor returned in 2005, he was forced to give up his bullpen catching duties, however he still served as an aide to third base coach Glenn Hoffman.

After recovering from his second bout of brain cancer, he returned to the job of bullpen catcher, then in 2012 was made a team scout.
