= 1987 Purdue Boilermakers baseball team =

College baseball season

1987 Purdue Boilermakers baseball
- Conference: Big Ten Conference
- Record: 36–24–1 (10–6 Big Ten)
- Head coach: Dave Alexander (10th season)
- MVP: Archi Cianfrocco
- Home stadium: Lambert Field

1987 Big Ten Conference baseball standings
	Conf.				Overall
Team	W		L	PCT	W		L	PCT
East
No. 23 Michigan ^{x}‍‍‡‍^{y}	13	–	3	.813	52	–	12	.813
Purdue ‍‍‍^{y}	10	–	6	.625	36	–	24	.600
Indiana ‍‍‍	7	–	9	.438	43	–	17	.717
Michigan State ‍‍‍	6	–	10	.375	34	–	20	.630
Ohio State ‍‍‍	4	–	12	.250	19	–	27	.413
West
Minnesota ^{x}‍‍‍	12	–	4	.750	36	–	25	.590
Iowa ‍‍‍	9	–	7	.563	29	–	28	.509
Illinois ‍‍‍	9	–	7	.563	32	–	24	.571
Northwestern ‍‍‍	5	–	11	.313	23	–	20	.535
Wisconsin ‍‍‍	5	–	11	.313	28	–	24	.538
x – Division champion ‡ – Tournament champion y – Invited to the NCAA tournament As of June 30, 1987; Rankings from Collegiate Baseball

The 1987 Purdue Boilermakers baseball team was a baseball team that represented Purdue University in the 1987 NCAA Division I baseball season. The Boilermakers were members of the East Division of the Big Ten Conference and played their home games at Lambert Field in West Lafayette, Indiana. They were led by 10th-year head coach Dave Alexander.

Their berth in the 1987 NCAA Division I baseball tournament was the first trip to the NCAA tournament in Purdue's history.

== Previous season ==
The Boilermakers finished the 1986 NCAA Division I baseball season 37–27 overall (9–7 conference) and second place in East division of the conference standings, qualifying for the 1986 Big Ten Conference baseball tournament, where they were swept out in the first round.

=== MLB draft ===
The following Boilermakers on the 1986 roster were selected in the 1986 Major League Baseball draft:

List of Drafted Players
Name	1986 Class	Pos.	Team	Round	Signed/Returned
Kent Maggard	Junior	RHP	Cleveland Indians	12th	Signed

== Roster ==
1987 Purdue Boilermakers baseball team
Players
Coaches

#	Pos.	Name	B/T	Height	Weight	Year	Previous school	Home town
		Troy Aeschliman	/	—	—	Jr
	OF	Jeff Allison	/	—	—	Sr	Valparaiso H. S.	Indianapolis, Indiana
	P	Pete Altenberger	/	—	—	Fr	St. Viator H. S.	Arlington Heights, Illinois
		John Carrico	/	—	—	So
	INF	Archi Cianfrocco	R/R	—	—	Jr	Onondaga Community College
		Mike Drum	/	—	—	Jr
	P	Scott Dubach	/	—	—	Sr
	INF	Mike Galle	/	—	—	So
	INF	Bob Gerhard	/	—	—	Jr
		Rex Gingerich	/	—	—	Sr
	P	Lee Huntley	/	—	—	Sr
		Jeff Kapp	/	—	—	Jr
	INF	Tom Kitchel	/	—	—	So
		Kyle Kraemer	/	—	—	Fr
	P	Tom Mayer	/	—	—	Jr
	C	Jim Meshberger	/	—	—	Fr
		Tom Ostrowski	/	—	—	Fr
	P	Tom Richter	/	—	—
	INF	Brett Roach	/	—	—	Sr
	OF	Jose Rosey	/	—	—	Sr
	OF	Bob Shoulders	/	—	—	Sr
	P	Andy Swain	/	—	—	So

Head coach

Dave Alexander

Assistant coach(es)

Legend

- (C) Team captain
- (S) Suspended
- (I) Ineligible
- Injured
- Current redshirt

Roster
Last update: December 7, 2019

== Schedule ==
1987 Purdue Boilermakers baseball game log
Regular season
March (9–6)

#	Date	Opponent	Site/stadium	Score	Overall record	B1G Record
1	March 6	at NC State	Doak Field • Raleigh, North Carolina,	4–6	0–1	0–0
2	March 7	at NC State	Doak Field • Raleigh, North Carolina	0–16	0–2	0–0
3	March 7	at NC State	Doak Field • Raleigh, North Carolina	0–7	0–3	0–0
4	March 8	at NC State	Doak Field • Raleigh, North Carolina	4–6	0–4	0–0
5	March 11	at NC State	Doak Field • Raleigh, North Carolina	7–6	1–4	0–0
6	March 12	vs George Mason	Doak Field • Raleigh, North Carolina	6–1	2–4	0–0
7	March 13	at Atlantic Christian	Nixon Field • Wilson, North Carolina,	10–1	3–4	0–0
8	March 14	at North Carolina Wesleyan	Bauer Field • Rocky Mount, North Carolina,	8–9	3–5	0–0
9	March 21	vs Murray State	Allen Field • Morehead, Kentucky	10–5	4–5	0–0
10	March 21	at Morehead State	Allen Field • Morehead, Kentucky	15–3	5–5	0–0
11	March 22	at Morehead State	Allen Field • Morehead, Kentucky	7–8	5–6	0–0
12	March 22	at Morehead State	Allen Field • Morehead, Kentucky	12–6	6–6	0–0
13	March 25	at Evansville	Bosse Field • Evansville, Indiana	7–6	7–6	0–0
14	March 28	at Lewis	Brennan Field • Romeoville, Illinois,	4–0	8–6	0–0
15	March 28	at Lewis	Brennan Field • Romeoville, Illinois	16–2	9–6	0–0

April (20–9–1)

#	Date	Opponent	Site/stadium	Score	Overall record	B1G Record
16	April 1	Ball State	Lambert Field • West Lafayette, Indiana	5–4	10–6	0–0
17	April 1	Ball State	Lambert Field • West Lafayette, Indiana	8–8	10–6–1	0–0
18	April 2	Huntington	Lambert Field • West Lafayette, Indiana	12–2	11–6–1	0–0
19	April 2	Huntington	Lambert Field • West Lafayette, Indiana	3–2	12–6–1	0–0
20	April 4	Eastern Illinois	Lambert Field • West Lafayette, Indiana	12–3	13–6–1	0–0
21	April 4	Eastern Illinois	Lambert Field • West Lafayette, Indiana	8–6	14–6–1	0–0
22	April 5	at Eastern Illinois	Monier Field • Charleston, Illinois,	9–10	14–7–1	0–0
23	April 5	at Eastern Illinois	Monier Field • Charleston, Illinois	5–10	14–8–1	0–0
24	April 7	at Butler	Unknown • Indianapolis, Indiana	5–2	15–8–1	0–0
25	April 8	St. Xavier	Lambert Field • West Lafayette, Indiana	12–6	16–8–1	0–0
26	April 8	St. Xavier	Lambert Field • West Lafayette, Indiana	13–1	17–8–1	0–0
27	April 11	at Michigan	Ray Fisher Stadium • Ann Arbor, Michigan,	0–8	17–9–1	0–1
28	April 11	at Michigan	Ray Fisher Stadium • Ann Arbor, Michigan	1–3	17–10–1	0–2
29	April 12	at Michigan	Ray Fisher Stadium • Ann Arbor, Michigan	1–4	17–11–1	0–3
30	April 13	at Michigan	Ray Fisher Stadium • Ann Arbor, Michigan	5–3	18–11–1	1–3
31	April 18	Michigan State	Lambert Field • West Lafayette, Indiana	5–4	19–11–1	2–3
32	April 18	Michigan State	Lambert Field • West Lafayette, Indiana	3–2	20–11–1	3–3
33	April 19	Michigan State	Lambert Field • West Lafayette, Indiana	3–2	21–11–1	4–3
34	April 19	Michigan State	Lambert Field • West Lafayette, Indiana	2–1	22–11–1	5–3
35	April 21	Butler	Lambert Field • West Lafayette, Indiana	12–2	23–11–1	5–3
36	April 23	Anderson	Lambert Field • West Lafayette, Indiana	2–1	24–11–1	5–3
37	April 23	Anderson	Lambert Field • West Lafayette, Indiana	8–5	25–11–1	5–3
38	April 25	Indiana	Lambert Field • West Lafayette, Indiana	5–8	25–12–1	5–4
39	April 25	Indiana	Lambert Field • West Lafayette, Indiana	3–1	26–12–1	6–4
40	April 26	at Indiana	Sembower Field • Bloomington, Indiana	2–7	26–13–1	6–5
41	April 26	at Indiana	Sembower Field • Bloomington, Indiana	6–7	26–14–1	6–6
42	April 28	at Notre Dame	Frank Eck Stadium • South Bend, Indiana	8–5	27–14–1	6–6
43	April 29	at Indianapolis	Greyhound Park • Indianapolis, Indiana	14–3	28–14–1	6–6
44	April 29	at Indianapolis	Greyhound Park • Indianapolis, Indiana	23–2	29–14–1	6–6
45	April 30	IUPUI	Lambert Field • West Lafayette, Indiana	8–9	29–15–1	6–6

May (5–4)

#	Date	Opponent	Site/stadium	Score	Overall record	B1G Record
46	May 1	Ohio State	Lambert Field • West Lafayette, Indiana	4–1	30–15–1	7–6
47	May 1	Ohio State	Lambert Field • West Lafayette, Indiana	2–1	31–15–1	8–6
48	May 2	Ohio State	Lambert Field • West Lafayette, Indiana	7–6	32–15–1	9–6
49	May 2	Ohio State	Lambert Field • West Lafayette, Indiana	6–5	33–15–1	10–6
50	May 10	at DePauw	Walker Field • Greencastle, Indiana	10–0	34–15–1	10–6
51	May 10	at DePauw	Walker Field • Greencastle, Indiana	6–7	34–16–1	10–6
52	May 12	Illinois	Lambert Field • West Lafayette, Indiana	9–13	34–17–1	10–6
53	May 13	Miami (OH)	Unknown • Oxford, Ohio,	2–4	34–18–1	10–6
54	May 13	Miami (OH)	Unknown • Oxford, Ohio	5–10	34–19–1	10–6

Postseason
B1G Tournament

#	Date	Opponent	Site/stadium	Score	Overall record	B1G Record
55	May 15	vs Minnesota	Ray Fisher Stadium • Ann Arbor, Michigan	9–3	35–19–1	10–6
56	May 16	vs Iowa	Ray Fisher Stadium • Ann Arbor, Michigan	4–0	36–19–1	10–6
57	May 17	at Michigan	Ray Fisher Stadium • Ann Arbor, Michigan	2–5	36–20–1	10–6
58	May 19	at Michigan	Ray Fisher Stadium • Ann Arbor, Michigan	2–4	36–21–1	10–6

Mideast Regional

#	Date	Opponent	Site/stadium	Score	Overall record	B1G Record
59	May 21	vs Texas A&M	Dudy Noble Field, Polk–DeMent Stadium • Starkville, Mississippi,	3–13	36–22–1	10–6
60	May 22	vs Western Carolina	Dudy Noble Field, Polk–DeMent Stadium • Starkville, Mississippi	7–8	36–23–1	10–6
