= Courseulles-sur-Mer =

- Commune
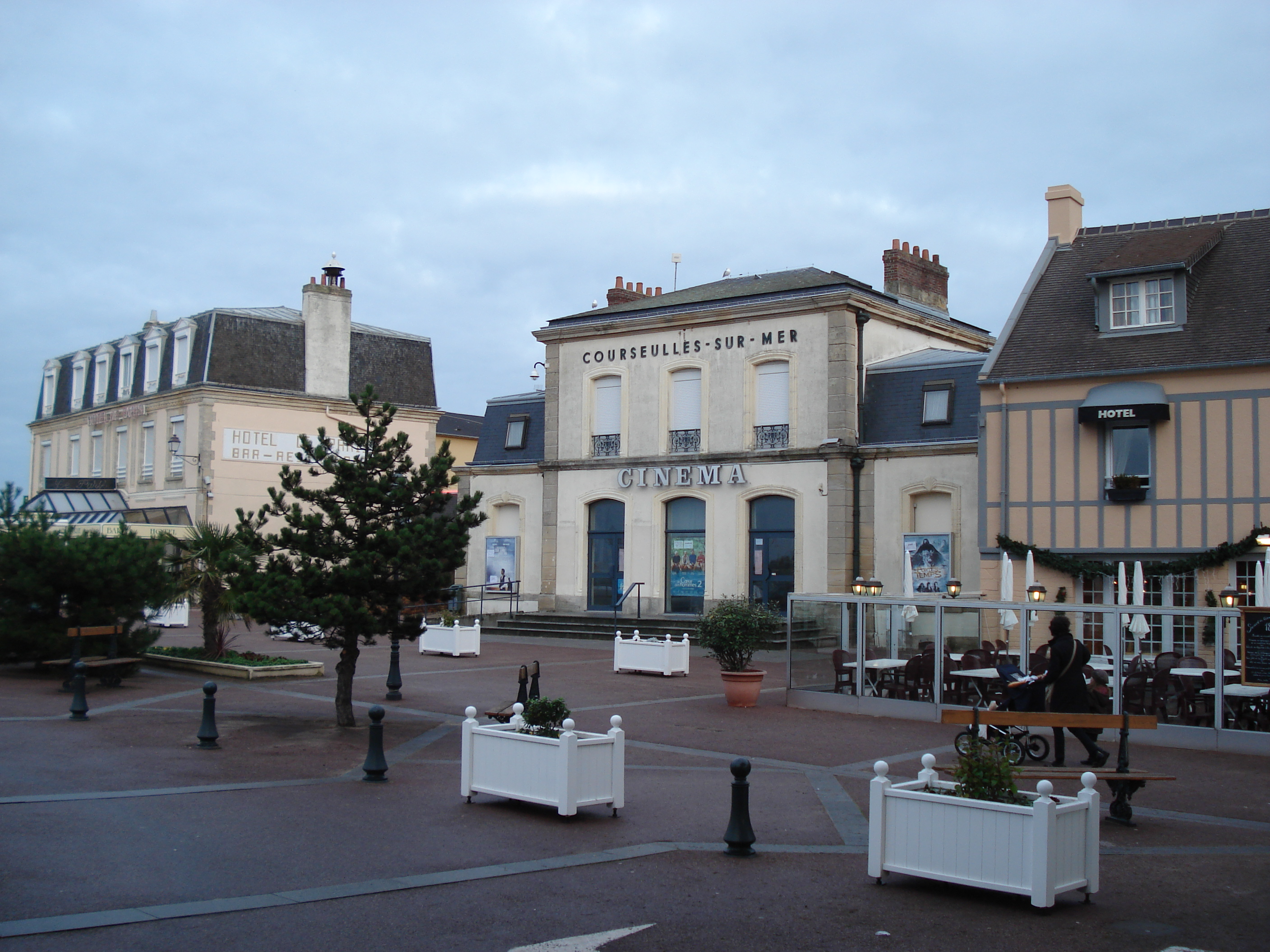
- The old railway station, converted into a cinema

- Coat of arms
- Location of Courseulles-sur-Mer
- Location within France Location within Normandy
- Coordinates: 49°20′01″N 0°27′23″W
- Country: France
- Region: Normandy
- Department: Calvados
- Arrondissement: Caen
- Canton: Courseulles-sur-Mer
- Intercommunality: CC Cœur de Nacre

Government
  - Mayor (2020–2026): Anne-Marie Philippeaux
- Area^{1}: 7.92 km^{2} (3.06 sq mi)
- Elevation: 8 m (26 ft)
- Highest elevation: 51 m (167 ft)
- Lowest elevation: 1 m (3.3 ft)
- Population (2023): 4,268
  - Density: 539/km^{2} (1,400/sq mi)
- Demonym: Courseullais.e
- Time zone: UTC+01:00 (CET)
  - Summer (DST): UTC+02:00 (CEST)
- INSEE/Postal code: 14191 /14470
- ^{1} French Land Register data, which excludes lakes, ponds, glaciers > 1 km^{2} (0.386 sq mi or 247 acres) and river estuaries.

Courseulles-sur-Mer (French pronunciation: [kuʁsœl syʁ mɛʁ], lit. 'Courseulles on Sea'), commonly known as Courseulles, is a commune in the Calvados department, Normandy, northwestern France. Until 1957, the town's name was simply Courseulles. It lies 3 km west of Bernières-sur-Mer and 18 km north of Caen.

It is a popular tourist destination not only with locals but also with international visitors who come to tour the Normandy landing beaches. The population of the town can reach 15,000 people in the summer months owing to the numerous summer homes, owned for the most part by Parisians. The town is split in two by the river Seulles.

== World War Two ==
More than 14,000 Canadians stormed the 8 kilometres (5 mi) stretch of a Lower Normandy Beach between Courseulles-sur-Mer and St. Aubin-sur-Mer on 6 June 1944. They were followed by 150,000 additional Canadian troops over the next few months, and throughout the summer of 1944 the Canadian military used the town’s port to unload upwards of 1,000 tons of material a day, for the first two weeks following D-Day on 6 June 1944.

Canadians of the 3rd Canadian Infantry Division and 2nd Canadian Armoured Brigade, suffered 1,074 casualties, including 369 killed on the beach and in the Calvados countryside on the first day of the invasion, reaching almost 10 km (6.2 mi) inland on the first day of fighting, the farthest advance of any of the Allied landing forces.

The Canadian military cemetery of Bény-Reviers is the resting place of 2,043 Canadians and 1 Frenchman. The land for this cemetery was donated by France to Canada after the Second World War and lies 4 km (2.5 mi) inland from Courseulles-sur-Mer, just off Route 79.

The Juno Beach Centre is a museum located in Courseulles-sur-Mer, at the head of the River Seulles, in the port's estuary, where Canadian troops landed and fought, on D-Day 6 June 1944. The museum opened on 6 June 2003, the 59th anniversary of the D-Day landings.

=== D-Day: La Cité ===
The strongest German defence position in the Juno assault area was concentrated at Courseulles-sur-Mer, on the estuary of the River Seulles. Delaying H-Hour for a higher tide, to clear offshore reefs, the Canadian landing at Courseulles-sur-Mer began slightly later than those to the west, giving the German defender a warning they would need.

Stützpuntkte (StP) (Strong-Point) Courseulles-sur-Mer, was a complex of three fortified ‘resistance nests’, two strengthened by numerous standard concrete fortifications, protecting anti-tank and artillery field guns. The layout followed no particular design; being established based on weapons available, its terrain features, and troops available to occupy. The concrete fortification casements at two resistance nests further disposed numerous entrenchments, in which mortars and heavy machine guns were emplaced. They were each manned by about 30-50 men, intended to fight under independent command. In command of the fight, across the Stützpuntkte (StP) Courseulles was Hauptmann Grote, Kdr. Kompanie 6. / Grenadier-Regiment 736./ Bataillon II., who perhaps had more ground to fight than men.

==== Widerstandnesten WN 29 ====
StP.Courseulles (Osten) was located at North 49.3358 Deg / West 00.45136 Deg and in June 1944, for targeting purposes, at: LZ1 vT MR Grid 972856 (Ref. GSGS 4250 1:50K: Creully Sheet 7E/5). The (WN) Resistance Nest at Courseulles (East) was a very large ‘platoon-sized’ position, attempting to protect entry into the town port and to deny exits off the beach, into the town. East of the river, its strength was dominated by an 88mm gun, protected to its front (to fire in enfilade), and a 50 mm gun, supported by machine gun and Tobruks. Opposite the harbour was a second 50mm gun (with Tobruk) and towards the centre a 75mm field gun, and 37mm tank turret, they supported by machine gun and Tobruks. The right front (NE) sea approach was protected by the large K.V. Gruppe Courseulles Beach Minefield: Mf 58. On its right was a 75mm field gun, protected by a substantial anti-tank ditch inland, and its right flank (SE approach) by the K.V. Gruppe Courseulles tactical minefield: Mf 43. The position's Züg Führer (acting commander) defence was enabled by an 'underground' network of tunnels and covered trenches, permitting unobserved movement.

Courseulles (Osten) was fronted by an area of coastal erosion with various works to prevent, control or delay its effects. There were groynes built out into the sea to try and stop the movement of sand. On D-Day the presence of the groynes together with the strong current along the beach and the beach obstacles made landings and lateral movement along the beach, tricky. To test an attacker, most of the buildings of Courseulles were further protected by sea walls. Here it was shelled for effect by the embarked 105 mm guns of 13th Field Regiment, RCA from H-30 to H+5 and began taking direct fire from the DD Tanks of 'B' Squadron, 1st Hussars towards 07h55 (BST), who landed correctly and on time as planned. Fourteen DD tanks of the 1st Hussars made it ashore, and quickly came to engage the strongpoint’s guns. An 88 mm gun, beside the harbour exit, a 50 mm behind it, and a 75 mm on the right flank, fired continuously until their protective shields could be pierced. No tanks were lost in the spirited duel.

Landing to its centre at 08h05, in a gap between its two 75mm guns, making a left flanking approach, came ‘A’ Company, The Regina Rifle Regiment, (OC Major F. E. Hodge). Successful in getting off the beach, engaged in heavy fighting, working in tandem, with ‘B’ Squadron, it ‘neutralized’ the strong-point. Pushing into Courseulles, 'A' Company, as set out in the plan, cleared Town Blocks 5, 6, and 7 but had to return to the beachfront (Block No.1) where the Germans had returned, by tunnels and trenches, to reoccupy their guns. The Regina’s began the disheartening task of clearing the beachfront again, it only came to be ‘captured’ after this second fight.

‘B’ Company landed at 08h15, further to the east; and quickly engaged the crew served weapon pillboxes positioned along the strong-point beachfront. The seawall offering little cover, but with good support from ‘B’ Squadron, they got off the beach and dashed into the strongpoint’s fortifications.

German Crew Served Weapons at StP.Courseulles (Osten)

Regelbau Type	Ringstand (Casement)	Weapon / Gun	Details
OB Gr.West Heer H677	Jagpanzerabwehrkanone	88 mm PaK 43/41	At Entrance with MG Posts
OB Gr.West Heer H669	Vf Field Gun Emplacement	75mm FK 16 n.Art (German)	On Right (East) Flank
OB Gr.West Heer H612	Vf Field Gun Emplacement	75 mm FK 231 (French)	In Centre Position
OB Gr.West Heer H669	KwK SK-L Open Pedestal	50mm Pak 38 L/42	On Left Flank Seawall
Regelbau Type Vf600	KwK SK-L Open Pedestal	50mm Pak 39 L/60	Inside Harbour Entrance
OB Gr.West Heer 604	Panzerstellung Tobrouk (80 cm)	37 mm Renault FT 331(f)	Tank Turret – Coaxial MG
OB Gr.West Heer Vf58c	80 cm Thick Tobrouk x4	Heavy MG	Crew Position: One to Rear
OB Gr.W Type 34 (Vf69)	Tobrouk sGranatwerfer	8.14 cm Heavy Mortar	Gruppen Crew and Observer
Weapon Crew Posts x5	Reinforced Vf Embrasure (Open)	Light Maschinengewehr MG	Half Steel Ring Traverse
Company Mortar Pits x2	Nest fur Ko-Granatenwerfer	50 mm Light Mortar	Type 36 (Vf58c)

==== Widerstandnesten WN 30 ====
StP.Courseulles (Süden) was located at North 49.3303 Deg / West 00. 4593 Deg and in June 1944, for targeting purposes, at: LZ1 vT MR Grid 969848 (Ref. GSGS 4250 1:50K: Creully Sheet 7E/5). The (WN) Resistance Nest at Courseulles (South) was a small ‘platoon-sized’ position, attempting to control the southeast exit, from Courseulles. Here, Hauptmann Grote had his Zug-Gruppen, Kompanie 6. / Batl II 736, establish a supporting depth position, opposite the Châteaux, reinforcing a group of houses, above the town centre. WN 30 was a crew served weapon position, with only light machine guns (MG) and a least one light 50mm mortar (in Granatwerfer Schutzenloch), undercover, in a Type 1 Fa position. With no PaK guns, tasked to 'defend' the south exit from town, it did cause some delay. Providing mortar and machine gun covering fire, into WN 29, with its height advantage it made the task of clearing the beachfront extremely difficult. Attacked by 'A' Company, The Regina Rifle Regiment, it took until late afternoon for Courseulles (Süden) to be taken.

=== D-Day: L’île ===
==== Widerstandnesten WN31 ====
StP.Courseulles (West) was located at North 49.3367 Deg / West W 00.4602 and in June 1944, for targeting purposes, at: LZ1 vT MR Grid 965858 (Ref. GSGS 4250 1:50K: Creully Sheet 7E/5). The (WN) Resistance Nest at Courseulles (West) was a very large ‘platoon-sized’ position, attempting to protect entry into the town port, deny exits off the beach, and prevent an out-flanking entry into the town. West of the River Seulles, still being 'developed', it sat on a small peninsula of land, water defending three of its approaches, its land based left front (NW) approach protected by the very large K.V.Gruppe Courseulles Beach Minefield: Mf 72. At its western end was a 50mm gun, in an open pit emplacement, supported by a Heavy MG. Towards its center, facing west down the beach, was a 75mm field gun and a 50mm gun, both in casemates. Overlooking the harbour was a 50mm gun, in a casemate (protecting its front), that could fire east or west. Additionally thirteen crew served, machine gun and mortar, weapon emplacements, had their rear was protected by the river.

With half of his Kompanie 6. / Batl II. / Gren.Regt 736., on the position, Hauptmann Grote commanded the fight for Stützpuntkte (StP) Courseulles, from a Type Regelbau Command Post Shelter / Bunker. Fighting WN 31, its Züg Führer (Acting Commander), having no 'urban' structures to observe 'over' the dunes, had to rely on a Type Regelbau R666 - Infantry Observation Bunker (with Panzerkuppel - 89P6 Small Turret) to adjust to the Canadian assault. Courseulles (West) was fronted by an area of coastal erosion, where sand deposits had blocked the River Seulles access to the sea and forced it into a loop. The strong-point was not fronted by beach villas, which were a feature of much of the JUNO Sector, and there were few landmarks, making it difficult to identifying the correct point on which to that land. After the Assault Force J1 Beach Bombardment Programme, which did not seem to have much actual effect, WN 31 began to take indirect 105mm artillery fire from the guns of 12th Field Regiment, RCA from H-30 to H+5 and direct fire from the DD Tanks of 'A' Squadron, 1st Hussars near 07h45. Landing just a little 'late', seven 'A' squadron immediately fired on the 50 mm anti-tank gun emplacement, it destroyed, ‘A’ Squadron began to ‘cruise up and down the beach’ engaging the machine gun crews, permitting the infantry to sweep over the dunes to begin their fight for the position.

Landing on its strong left flank, ‘B’ Company, Royal Winnipeg Rifles, (OC Captain P. E. Gower), was immediately pinned down by its heavy machine gun, and the 50mm, in a concrete pillbox, while taking accurate sniper fire. Skirting left away from the position, ‘B’ Company forced a crossing of the river, on a small bridge at MR 964857, and got in to clear ‘four’ defensible positions, on the ‘island’. The Coy Comd and twenty-six other ranks ‘survived’ the assault of the three casements and its twelve MG emplacements. It took until the early afternoon for WN 31 to be secured.

German Crew Served Weapons at StP.Courseulles (West).

Regelbau Type	Ringstand (Casement)	Weapon / Gun	Details
OB Gr.West Heer H612	Vf Reinforced Casement	75mm FK 16 n.Art. (German)	Positioned Left of Centre
OB Gr.West Heer H667(SK)	KwK - Doppelschartenstan	50mm Pak 38 L/42	Casement at Harbour Entrance
OB Gr.West Heer Vf 65a	KwK auf Sockellafetten SK-L	50mm Pak 38 L/42	Kampfwagenkanone: Open Pedestal
OB Gr.West Heer Vf600	KwK Sockellafetten: Six-Sided	50mm Pak 38 L/42	Open Pedestal - SK Modification
OB Gr.West Heer 604	Panzerstellung Tobrouk x1	37 mm Renault FT FT 31(f)	Tank Turret – Coaxial MG
OB Gr.West Heer H630	Casement with Tobrouk x1	Heavy MG - Firing Port	Position on Left Flank
OB Gr.West Type 34 (Vf69)	Tobrouk sGranatwerfer	8.14 cm Heavy Mortar	Gruppen Crew - On Left Flank
Weapon Crew Posts x3	Reinforced Concrete Vf (R630)	Light MG - Maschinengewehr	Half Steel Ring Traverse (Open)
Company Mortar Pits x2	Nest fur Granatenwerfer Type 36	(Vf58c) 50 mm Light Mortar	Left Flank / Centre Left

== Population ==
Historical population
Year	Pop.	±% p.a.
1968	1,938	—
1975	2,538	+3.93%
1982	2,992	+2.38%
1990	3,182	+0.77%
1999	3,886	+2.25%
2007	4,137	+0.79%
2012	4,200	+0.30%
2017	4,199	−0.00%
2023	4,268	+0.27%
Source: INSEE

== International relations ==
The commune is twinned with:

- Dartmouth, Devon, UK since 1977
- Rigaud, Québec, Canada since 1991
- Goldbach, Bavaria, Lower Franconia (Unterfranken) in Bavaria, Germany since 1995

== See also ==
- Communes of the Calvados department
