= Cameron Perkins =

American baseball player (born 1990)

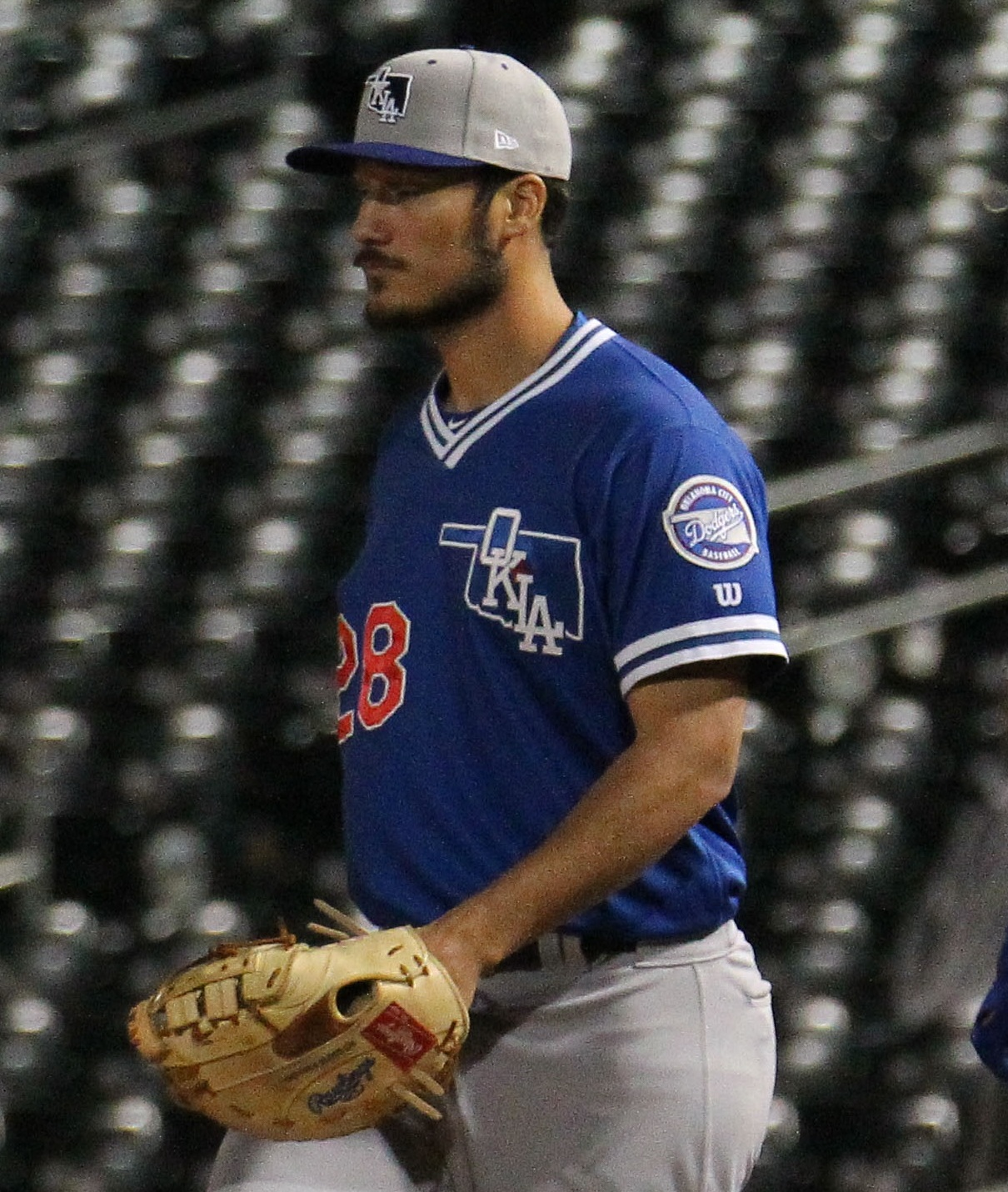
- Perkins with the Oklahoma City Dodgers in 2019
- Outfielder
- Born: September 27, 1990 (age 35); Beaumont, Texas, U.S.
- Batted: Right Threw: Right

MLB debut
- June 20, 2017, for the Philadelphia Phillies

Last MLB appearance
- September 22, 2017, for the Philadelphia Phillies

MLB statistics
- Batting average: .182
- Home runs: 1
- Runs batted in: 8
- Stats at Baseball Reference

Teams
- Philadelphia Phillies (2017)

Cameron Edward Perkins (born September 27, 1990) is an American former professional baseball outfielder. He previously played in Major League Baseball (MLB) for the Philadelphia Phillies. He was born in Beaumont, Texas, and played at Southport High School where he was drafted by the Seattle Mariners. Subsequently, he attended Purdue University, and excelled playing baseball there before the Philadelphia Phillies drafted him in 2012. While making his way through the minor leagues, he was three-times named an all-star before earning a promotion to the Major League, making his major league debut in June 2017.

== Amateur career ==
Perkins was born to parents Dale Perkins and Patti Boyett in Beaumont, Texas; he has four siblings. He attended Vidor High School, where he played for the varsity team his sophomore year. He also played football, basketball, and participated in track and field. As a junior, Perkins transferred to Southport High School, where he would live with his father.

Perkins was drafted by the Seattle Mariners in the 43rd round of the 2009 Major League Baseball draft out of Southport High School in Indianapolis, Indiana. He did not sign and played college baseball at Purdue University from 2010 to 2012.

== Professional career ==
=== Philadelphia Phillies ===
Perkins was drafted by the Philadelphia Phillies in the sixth round of the 2012 Major League Baseball draft. He signed with the Phillies and made his professional debut with the rookie-level Gulf Coast League Phillies and also played for the Williamsport Crosscutters. Perkins played for the Clearwater Threshers in 2013. He started 2014 with the Double-A Reading Fightin Phils and was promoted to the Triple-A Lehigh Valley IronPigs in June.

Perkins started 2017 with the Lehigh Valley IronPigs and was called up to the Phillies on June 20, 2017, making his MLB debut later that same day. In 42 appearances for Philadelphia during his rookie campaign, Perkins batted .182/.237/.273 with one home run and eight RBI.

=== Seattle Mariners ===
On December 11, 2017, the Seattle Mariners claimed Perkins off waivers from the Phillies. On April 2, 2018, Perkins was removed from the 40–man roster and sent outright to the Triple–A Tacoma Rainiers. He spent the majority of the year with Tacoma, also playing in four games for the Low–A Everett AquaSox. In 94 games for the Rainiers, Perkins batted .257/.312/.420 with 10 home runs and 48 RBI. He elected free agency following the season on November 2.

=== Los Angeles Dodgers ===
On January 4, 2019, Perkins signed a minor league contract with the Los Angeles Dodgers. In 84 games for the Triple–A Oklahoma City Dodgers, he batted .282/.351/.459 with nine home runs, 35 RBI, and seven stolen bases. Perkins elected free agency following the season on November 4.

=== Sugar Land Skeeters ===
On February 25, 2020, Perkins signed with the Sugar Land Skeeters of the Atlantic League of Professional Baseball. He did not play a game for the team due to the cancellation of the ALPB season because of the COVID-19 pandemic and became a free agent after the year.
