= Dan Black (baseball) =

American baseball player (born 1987)

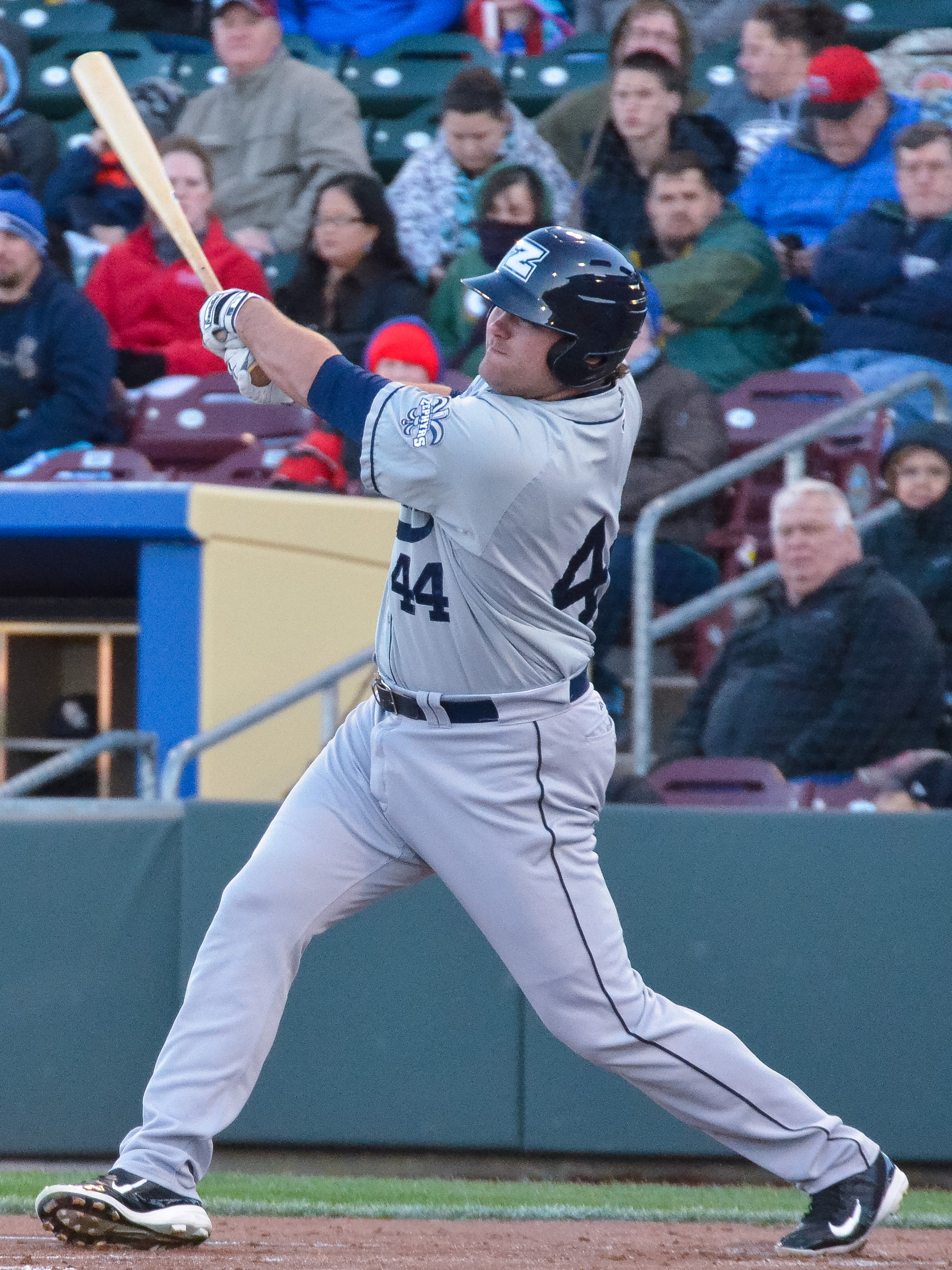
- Black with the New Orleans Zephyrs in 2016
- First baseman
- Born: July 2, 1987 (age 39); Indianapolis, Indiana, U.S.
- Batted: Switch Threw: Right

KBO debut
- June 4, 2015, for the KT Wiz

Last KBO appearance
- October 5, 2015, for the KT Wiz

KBO statistics (through 2015)
- Batting average: .333
- Home runs: 12
- RBI: 32
- Stats at Baseball Reference

Teams
- KT Wiz (2015)
Medals
Men's baseball
Representing United States
WBSC Premier12
Silver medal – second place	2015 Tokyo	Team

Daniel David Black (born July 2, 1987) is an American former professional baseball first baseman. He played in the KBO League for the KT Wiz in 2015.

== Career ==
=== Purdue ===
Black played college baseball at Purdue University from 2007 to 2009. During his career he hit 36 home runs. In 2008, he played collegiate summer baseball with the Cotuit Kettleers of the Cape Cod Baseball League. Black was drafted by the San Francisco Giants in the 35th round of the 2008 Major League Baseball (MLB) draft, but did not sign and returned to Purdue.

=== Chicago White Sox ===
Black was drafted by the Chicago White Sox in the 14th round of the 2009 MLB draft. Black played in the White Sox minor league organization from 2009 to 2015.

=== KT Wiz ===
He was released by the White Sox on May 28, 2015, so that he could sign with the KT Wiz of the KBO League.

=== Miami Marlins ===
On December 24, 2015, Black signed a minor league contract with the Miami Marlins organization that included an invitation to Spring Training. He was released by the Marlins on May 26, 2016.

=== Diablos Rojos del Mexico ===
On June 7, 2016, Black signed with the Diablos Rojos del México of the Mexican Baseball League. He was released on September 23, 2016.

== Coaching career ==
In 2025, Black was named as bench coach for the Springfield Cardinals the Double-A affiliate of the St. Louis Cardinals for the 2025 season.
