= Juno Beach Centre =

Museum in Normandy, France

- Centre Juno Beach

- Established: 6 June 2003
- Location: Courseulles-sur-Mer, Normandy, France
- Coordinates: 49°20′11″N 0°27′42″W
- Founder: Garth Webb
- Website: www.junobeach.org

The Juno Beach Centre (French: Centre Juno Beach) is a museum located in Courseulles-sur-Mer in the Calvados region of Normandy, France. It is situated immediately behind the beach codenamed Juno, the section of the Allied beachhead on which 14,000 Canadian troops landed on D-Day 6 June 1944.

The centre was conceived in the 1990s by a group of Canadian veterans who felt that the contributions and sacrifices of Canadian soldiers during the liberation of Europe were not properly commemorated and represented in the Normandy region. The project, spearheaded by veteran Garth Webb and his companion Lise Cooper, began initially as a grassroots fundraising campaign that eventually gained the financial support of many institutions and businesses and the Canadian and French governments at many levels. The centre was inaugurated on 6 June 2003. Over one thousand Canadian veterans attended the inauguration in 2003, as well as the 2004 ceremony for the 60th anniversary of D-Day.

The museum's scope is not only the D-Day landings. Through detailed and interactive exhibition rooms, the museum relates the story of life in Canada before the outbreak of the war, Canada's civilian and military contribution to the war effort, and contemporary Canadian society in the decades since World War II.

The building itself, designed by Canadian architect Brian K. Chamberlain, is a single-storey structure with five main points, resembling a stylized maple leaf. The exterior is clad in titanium scales and stands about 100 metres back from the present line of sand dunes. A ceremonial area, which features a statue entitled Remembrance and Renewal, stands between the centre and the dunes. A gap in the dunes is filled by a symbolic structure shaped as a landing craft—a memorial to the French Resistance. An intact German bunker, once an observation post, stands immediately in front of this memorial.

The museum also houses a temporary exhibition space which changes approximately once per year and which highlights histories and themes relating to Canada past and present.

The Juno Beach Centre is open year-round and closes routinely for the month of January. It offers guided visits of Juno Beach that are provided by Canadian students.

Canadian Prime Minister Justin Trudeau visited on 6 June 2019 as part of the 75th anniversary of the D-Day landings.

During the spring of 2022, the Juno Beach Centre was under threat from a planned condominium development by French company Foncim. The development was called Domaine des Dunes and construction of it would heavily use the Centre's access road, which was built and paid for by the Centre, and which would bear the cost of repairs. Heavy use of the road by construction vehicles would also greatly reduce tourism access to the Centre. The dispute was resolved in October 2022 when the land was purchased by the local government of Courseulles-Sur-Mer and the Canadian Federal Government, with the Canadian Government contributing 4 million dollars to halt the construction of the condominiums.
