= Creighton–Nebraska men's basketball rivalry =

American college basketball rivalry

- Creighton Bluejays Nebraska Cornhuskers
- Sport: Basketball
- First meeting: March 3, 1923; Creighton, 46–24
- Latest meeting: December 7, 2025; Nebraska, 71–50
- Next meeting: December 5, 2026; Omaha, Nebraska
- Stadiums: CHI Health Center; Pinnacle Bank Arena

Statistics
- Total meetings: 59
- All-time series: Creighton leads, 30–29
- Largest victory: Nebraska, 86–46 (1981)
- Longest win streak: Creighton, 7 (2011–2017); Nebraska, 7 (1990–1997)
- Current win streak: Nebraska, 2 (2024-2025)

Locations of Creighton and Nebraska

The Creighton–Nebraska men's basketball rivalry is an intrastate college basketball rivalry between the Creighton Bluejays and Nebraska Cornhuskers. The programs represent Creighton University and the University of Nebraska–Lincoln, located just fifty miles apart. The teams have met annually since 1977, usually in early December.

== Series history ==
The series began on March 3, 1923, a 46–23 Creighton victory. The first seven games of the series took place sporadically throughout the 1920s and 1930s; no further games were scheduled until the late 1970s. Since 1977, Nebraska and Creighton have met at least once annually, a stretch of 43 consecutive seasons. The schools have met twice in postseason tournaments, both Nebraska wins in the opening round of the 1984 and 2004 NIT.

Since Creighton has not had a football program since 1942, there are a significant number of Creighton basketball fans who also support Nebraska's football program. These fans are often derisively referred to by Nebraska fans as "Jayskers," a portmanteau of "Bluejays" and "Cornhuskers."

== Game results ==
Creighton victories	Nebraska victories	Tie games

No.	Date	Location	Winner	Score
1	March 3, 1923	Omaha	Creighton	46–24
2	February 2, 1924	Omaha	Nebraska	25–21
3	February 28, 1925	Omaha	Nebraska	15–11
4	January 9, 1926	Omaha	Nebraska	20–15
5	February 15, 1926	Lincoln	Creighton	15–11
6	March 4, 1932	Omaha	Creighton	47–18
7	March 7, 1932	Lincoln	Creighton	28–26
8	December 9, 1977	Lincoln	Nebraska	65–58
9	December 9, 1978	Omaha	Creighton	78–61
10	December 8, 1979	Lincoln	Nebraska	64–55
11	December 6, 1980	Omaha	Creighton	66–61^{OT}
12	December 5, 1981	Lincoln	Nebraska	86–46
13	December 4, 1982	Omaha	Nebraska	65–62
14	December 3, 1983	Lincoln	Nebraska	65–56
15	March 15, 1984	Omaha	Nebraska	56–54
16	December 8, 1984	Omaha	Nebraska	78–73
17	December 7, 1985	Lincoln	Nebraska	71–52
18	December 6, 1986	Omaha	Creighton	78–66
19	January 3, 1987	Lincoln	Nebraska	70–65^{OT}
20	December 9, 1987	Omaha	Creighton	88–73
21	November 26, 1988	Lincoln	Nebraska	86–77
22	December 14, 1989	Omaha	Creighton	86–83
23	December 6, 1990	Lincoln	Nebraska	97–63
24	December 7, 1991	Omaha	Nebraska	90–85
25	December 10, 1992	Lincoln	#25 Nebraska	100–83
26	December 9, 1993	Omaha	Nebraska	67–53
27	December 7, 1994	Lincoln	Nebraska	85–57
28	December 6, 1995	Omaha	Nebraska	88–67
29	January 8, 1997	Lincoln	Nebraska	71–52
30	December 10, 1997	Omaha	Creighton	81–73

No.	Date	Location	Winner	Score
31	December 9, 1998	Lincoln	Nebraska	76–60
32	December 9, 1999	Omaha	Creighton	89–72
33	January 2, 2001	Lincoln	Creighton	62–51
34	December 12, 2001	Omaha	Creighton	76–70
35	December 21, 2002	Lincoln	#20 Creighton	81–73
36	December 10, 2003	Omaha	Creighton	61–54
37	March 16, 2004	Omaha	Nebraska	71–70
38	December 11, 2004	Lincoln	Creighton	50–48
39	December 11, 2005	Omaha	Creighton	70–44
40	November 18, 2006	Lincoln	Nebraska	73–61
41	November 24, 2007	Omaha	Creighton	74–62
42	November 29, 2008	Lincoln	Nebraska	54–52
43	December 6, 2009	Omaha	Creighton	67–61
44	December 5, 2010	Lincoln	Nebraska	59–54
45	December 4, 2011	Omaha	Creighton	76–66
46	December 6, 2012	Lincoln	Creighton	64–42
47	December 8, 2013	Omaha	Creighton	82–67
48	December 7, 2014	Lincoln	Creighton	65–55
49	December 9, 2015	Omaha	Creighton	83–67
50	December 7, 2016	Lincoln	#10 Creighton	77–62
51	December 9, 2017	Omaha	Creighton	75–65
52	December 8, 2018	Lincoln	#24 Nebraska	94–75
53	December 7, 2019	Omaha	Creighton	95–76
54	December 11, 2020	Omaha	#8 Creighton	98–74
55	November 16, 2021	Lincoln	Creighton	77–69
56	December 4, 2022	Omaha	Nebraska	63–53
57	December 3, 2023	Lincoln	#15 Creighton	89–60
58	November 22, 2024	Omaha	Nebraska	74–63
59	December 7, 2025	Lincoln	Nebraska	71–50
Series: Creighton leads 30–29
