= Lambert Field (Purdue University) =

Baseball stadium in West Lafayette, Indiana, US (1965–2012)

- Interactive map of Lambert Field
- Location: West Stadium Avenue east of David Ross Road, West Lafayette, Indiana, USA
- Coordinates: 40.430493°N 86.924772°W
- Owner: Purdue University
- Operator: Purdue University
- Capacity: 1,100
- Surface: Natural grass
- Scoreboard: Electronic
- Field size: 340 ft. (LF), 375 ft. (LCF), 408 ft. (CF), 375 ft. (RCF), 340 ft. (RF)

Construction
- Opened: 1965
- Renovated: 1990, 1994, 1999
- Closed: 2012

Tenant
- Purdue Boilermakers baseball (Big Ten) (1965–2012)

Lambert Field was a baseball stadium in West Lafayette, Indiana. It was the home field of the Purdue Boilermakers baseball from 1965 until 2012 and held 1,100 people. It was named after former Purdue baseball coach Ward Lambert.

== History ==
Opened in 1965, Lambert Field succeeded the Old Lambert Field (also known as Ross-Ade Field) as the home of Purdue baseball. The construction of Mackey Arena on the location of Old Lambert Field necessitated the move.

In the 1990s, the university undertook three renovation projects on Lambert Field. In 1990, a new press box was added, and the seating areas were improved. In 1994, an electronic scoreboard was installed. In 1999, the university adopted a yearly renovation plan for Lambert. The annual improvements have added new fences in the outfield and foul territory, a new backstop, new bullpens, a screen to protect the parking lot beyond the left field fence, and an irrigation system.

In 2002, the facility hosted the Indiana North-South All-Star Game.

In 2012, Purdue won its first Big 10 Regular Season championship since 1909 in the field's final season.

== Naming ==
The field was named for former Purdue basketball and baseball coach Ward Lambert. During three stints coaching the baseball program (1917, 1919–35, and 1945–6), Lambert compiled a 163–156–7 record. For his success in coaching Purdue's basketball program, Lambert was inducted into the Naismith Basketball Hall of Fame in 1960.

== New stadium ==
Purdue built a new baseball venue, Alexander Field, which it began using in 2013. Although the field was planned to open for the 2012 season, construction delays led Purdue to use Lambert Field through the end of the 2012 season. At the end of the season, Lambert was razed to allow space for additional parking for the Student Fitness and Wellness Center.
