= Matt Bischoff =

Baltimore Orioles
- Pitcher
- Born: May 21, 1987 (age 39); Decatur, Indiana
- Bats: Right Throws: Right
- Stats at Baseball Reference

Matthew David Bischoff (born May 21, 1987) is a minor league baseball pitcher who is a free agent. Bischoff, a pitcher, bats and throws right-handed. He stands at 6 feet 0 inches (1.83 m) and weighs 190 pounds (86 kg). Bischoff attended New Haven High School where he set a school career record in wins and strikeouts. He then enrolled at Purdue University where he played baseball for four years (2007–2010). He was named the Big Ten Conference Baseball Freshman of the Year in 2007. Bischoff holds the career and single season strikeouts record for Purdue's baseball team. From Purdue, he was drafted by the Seattle Mariners during the 2010 Major League Baseball draft. He made his professional baseball debut at the rookie level with the Pulaski Mariners that year.

== Early life ==
Bischoff attended New Haven High School, where he was a four-year letterman. During his freshman season, he compiled a record of 3–2 with a 3.20 earned run average (ERA), nine saves, and 63 strikeouts. In his sophomore campaign, Bischoff went 9–1 with a 1.20 ERA, and 120 strikeouts. His strikeout total broke a school record. He was named to the all-conference team after the season. Bischoff went 11–2 with a 0.70 ERA, and 137 strikeouts during his junior season. He broke the school's strikeout record, which he set the season before. He was a first team all-conference, first team all-area, and first team all-state member that season. In his senior year, Bischoff went 12–3 with 133 strikeouts. After the season, the Fort Wayne News-Sentinel named Bischoff as the male athlete of the year. He holds the school record in career wins (35), and strikeouts (453). Bischoff also played tennis, and basketball while in high school. For all four of his years on the school's baseball team, his father, Dave Bischoff, was his coach.

== College career ==
Bischoff attended Purdue University from 2007 to 2010. In his freshman season, he compiled a record of 3–2 with a 2.85 ERA, one complete game, one shutout, two saves, and 61 strikeouts in 14 games, six starts. That season, he was named the Big Ten Freshman of the Year. Bischoff was also named a Collegiate Baseball Newspaper Freshman All-American, and a second team All-Big Ten selection. During his sophomore season, Bischoff went 6–3 with a 3.96 ERA, and 55 strikeouts in 14 games, all starts. He was a first team All-Big Ten selection that year. After the season, Bischoff was drafted by the New York Mets in the 47^{th} round of the 2008 Major League Baseball draft.

In his junior campaign, Bischoff compiled a 4–5 record with a 5.54 ERA, three complete games, and 80 strikeouts in 14 games, all starts. He was a third team All-Big Ten selection that season. In his final season at Purdue, Bischoff compiled a 10–2 record with a 3.22 ERA, two complete games, and 95 strikeouts in 13 games, all starts. Bischoff was selected in the 20^{th} round of the 2010 Major League Baseball draft by the Seattle Mariners. Bischoff currently holds the Purdue career record for strikeouts with 291. His 2010 strikeouts total is also a school single-season record. He was also the first player in school history to win All-Big Ten honors all four years.

== Professional career ==
After signing with the Seattle Mariners in 2010, Bischoff was assigned to the rookie-level Pulaski Mariners. Baseball America described Bischoff as doing an "excellent job of competing with average stuff". That season, he compiled a 4–4 record with a 3.30 ERA, five saves, and 45 strikeouts in 17 games, all in relief. Bischoff was promoted to the Class-A Clinton LumberKings during their post-season run in the Midwest League playoffs.
