= Greg Goff =

American baseball coach (born 1970)

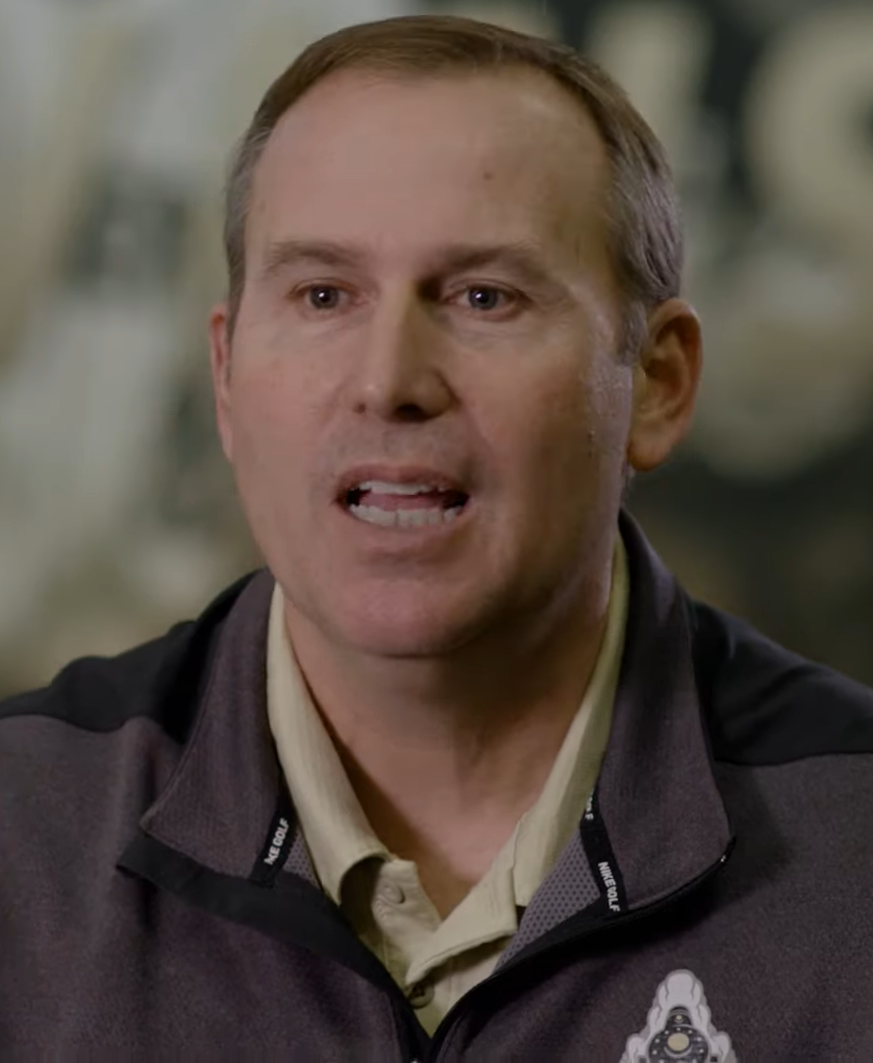
- Goff in 2022

Current position
- Title: Head coach
- Team: Purdue
- Conference: Big Ten
- Record: 177–150

Biographical details
- Born: September 24, 1970 (age 56); Jackson, Tennessee, U.S.

Playing career
- 1990–1991: Jackson State CC
- 1992–1993: Delta State
- Position: Pitcher

Coaching career (HC unless noted)
- 1994–1997: Delta State (asst.)
- 1998–1999: Southeast Missouri State (asst.)
- 2000–2003: Kentucky (asst.)
- 2004–2007: Montevallo
- 2008–2014: Campbell
- 2015–2016: Louisiana Tech
- 2017: Alabama
- 2018–2019: Purdue (assistant)
- 2020–present: Purdue

Head coaching record
- Overall: 639–489–1
- Tournaments: 14–9

Accomplishments and honors

Championships
- Gulf South Conference East Division (2006); NCAA Division II South Central Region (2006); Big South Conference North Division (2013); Big South Conference Tournament (2014)

Awards
- ABCA SouthCentral Region Coach of the Year (2006); Alabama BCA Coach of the Year (2006); GSC East Division All-Decade Second Team (2010); Big South Conference Coach of the Year (2013)

Greg Goff (born September 24, 1970) is an American college baseball coach and former pitcher. He is the head baseball coach at Purdue University. Goff played college baseball at Jackson State Community College from 1990 to 1991 and Delta State University from 1992 to 1993. He served as the head coach at the University of Montevallo from 2004 to 2007, Campbell University from 2008 to 2014, Louisiana Tech University from 2015 to 2016 and the University of Alabama in 2017.

== Coaching career ==
Goff was hired as the head coach of the Alabama Crimson Tide baseball team on June 17, 2016. He led the team to a 19–34–1 season before being fired for possibly violating NCAA rules by seeking to revoke some player scholarships.

Following his dismissal, Mark Wasikowski hired Goff as a volunteer assistant for the Purdue Boilermakers baseball staff. Because Goff accepted a volunteer position, Alabama still had to pay his salary over the length of his contract. On June 13, 2019, just two days after Wasikowski left to become the head coach at Oregon, Goff was promoted to head coach.

== Head coaching record ==
Record table
Season	Team	Overall	Conference	Standing	Postseason
Montevallo Falcons (Gulf South Conference) (2004–2007)
2004	Montevallo	26–27	6–15	7th (East)	
2005	Montevallo	36–22	11–10	4th (East)	
2006	Montevallo	43–18	16–4	1st (East)	NCAA Division II College World Series
2007	Montevallo	47–17	13–5	2nd (East)	NCAA Division II Regional
Montevallo:		152–84	46–34		
Campbell Fighting Camels (Atlantic Sun Conference) (2008–2011)
2008	Campbell	21–37	13–20	T–10th	
2009	Campbell	27–24	7–19	10th	
2010	Campbell	28–27	8–19	T–10th	
2011	Campbell	17–37	3–27	11th	
:			31–85		
Campbell Fighting Camels (Big South Conference) (2012–2014)
2012	Campbell	41–18	15–9	2nd	
2013	Campbell	49–10	19–5	1st (North)	
2014	Campbell	41–21	18–8	2nd (North)	NCAA Division I Regional
Campbell:		224–174	52–22		
Louisiana Tech Bulldogs (Conference USA) (2015–2016)
2015	Louisiana Tech	25–27	8–21	12th	
2016	Louisiana Tech	42–20	19–11	5th	NCAA Division I Regional
Louisiana Tech:		67–47	27–32		
Alabama Crimson Tide (Southeastern Conference) (2017)
2017	Alabama	19–34–1	5–24–1	14th	
Alabama:		19–34–1	5–24–1		
Purdue Boilermakers (Big Ten Conference) (2020–present)
2020	Purdue	7–7	0–0		Season canceled due to COVID-19
2021	Purdue	16–26	16–26	12th	
2022	Purdue	29–21	9–12	7th	Big Ten tournament
2023	Purdue	24–29	11–13	9th	
2024	Purdue	33–24	13–11	6th	Big Ten tournament
2025	Purdue	31–23	11–19	15th	
2026	Purdue	37–20	18–12	5th	Big Ten tournament
Purdue:		177–150	78–93		
Total:		639–489–1			
National champion Postseason invitational champion Conference regular season champion Conference regular season and conference tournament champion Division regular season champion Division regular season and conference tournament champion Conference tournament champion
