= Purdue Boilermakers baseball =

- 2026 Purdue Boilermakers baseball team
- Founded: 1888; 138 years ago
- University: Purdue University
- Head coach: Greg Goff (7th season)
- Conference: Big Ten
- Location: West Lafayette, Indiana
- Home stadium: Alexander Field (capacity: 1,500)
- Nickname: Boilermakers
- Colors: Old gold and black

NCAA tournament appearances
- 1987, 2012, 2018

Conference tournament champions
- 2012

Conference regular season champions
- 1909, 2012

The Purdue Boilermakers baseball team is the varsity intercollegiate baseball program of Purdue University in West Lafayette, Indiana, United States. The program's first season was in 1888, and it has been a member of the NCAA Division I Big Ten Conference since the start of the 1906 season. Its home venue is Alexander Field, located on Purdue's campus. Greg Goff is the team's head coach starting in the 2020 season. The program has appeared in 3 NCAA tournaments. It has won one conference tournament championship and 2 regular season conference titles. As of the start of the 2021 Major League Baseball season, 24 former Boilermakers have appeared in Major League Baseball.

== History ==
=== Early history ===
The program's first season of play was 1888, and the team played without a head coach until 1892, when W. M. Phillips became the head coach. Also in 1892, the program began playing at newly dedicated home venue Stuart Field. The first game at Stuart was against Butler on April 16, 1892. Purdue won the game 14–9. After Phillips' two-year tenure as head coach (1892–1893), the program played without a head coach until 1900, when W. H. Fox assumed the position for two seasons (1900–1901). The program then had several different head coaches until Hugh Nicol began a nine-year tenure in 1906. Nicol's first season was also the program's first as a member of the Big Nine Conference (renamed the Big Ten Conference following the 1917 season, when Michigan rejoined the conference after a 12-season hiatus). In 1909, Purdue won its first Big Ten Championship. Future Major League Baseball player Walt Tragesser played on the 1909 team.

Nicol left the head coaching position following the 1914 season, and B. P. Pattison (previously the head coach at West Virginia) coached the team for the next two seasons (1915–1916).

In 1916, Pattison's final season, Purdue had an 8–4 record in Big Ten games. However, Purdue had generally struggled in Big Ten games since joining the conference and continued to do so. The Boilermakers had a winning conference record only 11 times from 1917 to 1978. In that span, the team opened two new home venues. On April 6, 1940, the team defeated Wabash College 7–4 in its first game at Ross–Ade Field, later renamed Lambert Field. On April 14, 1965, the Boilermakers lost 4–2 to Notre Dame in the team's first game at the modern Lambert Field. Both Old Lambert Field and the modern Lambert Field were named for Ward Lambert, head coach of the program for 19 seasons (1917, 1919–1935, 1945–1946).

=== Dave Alexander era ===
In 1978, Dave Alexander became the program's head coach. When the Big Ten split into two, five-team divisions in 1981, the team finished 2nd behind Michigan, Purdue's best conference finish since 1928. As a result of the second-place finish, the team qualified for the inaugural Big Ten Tournament, which was also the program's first postseason appearance. The team finished the tournament with a 1–2 record. Purdue qualified for two more conference tournaments in the 1980s (1986, 1987) and reached its first NCAA tournament in 1987. Playing in the Mideast Regional, Purdue went 0–2, losing 13–3 to Texas A&M and 8–7 to Western Carolina.

=== Steve Green era ===
Alexander stepped down from the head coaching position following the 1991 season as the program's all-time wins leader with 407. He was replaced by Steve Green. During Green's tenure, the team qualified for three Big Ten Tournaments (1993, 1995, 1997). However, after a 2–9 start to the 1998 season, Green struck a player in an altercation following a loss to Evansville. He resigned following the altercation. Interim coach Bob Shepherd was the head coach for the rest of the 1998 season, and the team had a 21–20 record during Shepherd's tenure to finish 23–29 overall.

=== Doug Schreiber era ===
Prior to the 1999 season, Purdue hired Doug Schreiber as its permanent head coach. In the 2000s decade, Schreiber's teams appeared in seven Big Ten Tournaments and finished second in the conference three times (2001, 2005, 2008).

In 2012, Purdue had its most successful season. On April 15, Schreiber won his 407th and 408th games in a doubleheader sweep of Illinois, passing Dave Alexander as the program's winningest head coach. The team, after winning both the regular season conference championship and the Big Ten tournament, was given a #1 seed in the NCAA tournament and hosted a regional. Due to Lambert Field's not meeting NCAA standards and construction delays on the program's new home venue, Alexander Field, Purdue hosted the regional at U.S. Steel Yard in Gary, Indiana. After winning its opening round game against Valparaiso, Purdue lost consecutive games to Kent State and Kentucky and was eliminated from the tournament. Purdue finished the season with a 45 wins, a school record. Following the 2016 season, Schreiber resigned as the head baseball coach at Purdue.

=== Mark Wasikowski era ===
On June 24, 2016, Purdue hired Oregon Ducks baseball assistant coach, Mark Wasikowski to be the team's head coach. Purdue's 19 win improvement from 2016 to 2017 was the largest improvement in NCAA Division I baseball during the 2017 season. After leading Purdue to an 87–82 record over three seasons, Wasikowski left Purdue to become the head coach at Oregon.

=== Greg Goff era ===
In 2019, Purdue hired Greg Goff to be their latest head coach. Goff led the team to a 23–32 record through his first two seasons as head coach.

To begin their 2022 season, the Boilermakers produced the best start to a season since 1909, with series sweeps over Princeton and South Dakota State en route to an 8–0 start.

=== Conference affiliations ===
- Independent (1888–1905)
- Big Ten Conference (1906–present)
  - Known as the Big Nine Conference from 1906 to 1917

== Purdue in the NCAA tournament ==
Year	Record	Pct	Notes
1987	0–2	.000	Mideast Regional
2012	1–2	.333	Hosted Gary Regional
2018	1–2	.333	Chapel Hill Regional
TOTALS	2-6	.250	

== Venues ==
Since the program began play in 1888, it has had four venues, each on the university's campus.

=== Stuart Field ===
From 1892 to 1939, the team played at Stuart Field on the university's campus. Currently, the Elliott Hall of Music stands on the former site of Stuart Field.

=== Old Lambert Field ===
The Boilermakers played at Old Lambert Field from 1940 to 1964. At the beginning of its use, Old Lambert Field was known as Ross–Ade Field (named for David E. Ross and George Ade, also the benefactors of Ross–Ade Stadium, the school's football venue). Old Lambert Field was located next to Lambert Fieldhouse.

=== Lambert Field ===
The program played at Lambert Field from prior to the 1965 season until the end of the 2012 season. Named for former Purdue baseball and men's basketball coach Ward Lambert, the venue had a capacity of 1,100 spectators. It was torn down in summer 2012. The field was located next to the current location of Purdue's Student Fitness and Wellness Center.

=== Alexander Field ===
In 2013, the program began playing at Alexander Field. The venue was scheduled for completion prior to the 2012 season, but construction delays caused the completion date to be pushed back. The venue has a capacity of 1,500 spectators.

== Head coaches ==
The program's most successful coach was head coach Doug Schreiber, who had 485 victories at the school. Schreiber passed Dave Alexander on the Purdue wins list on April 15, 2012, when Purdue swept a doubleheader against Illinois.

Purdue's longest tenured head coach is Ward Lambert, who coached the team for a total of 19 seasons in three separate coaching stints.

Year(s)	Coach	Seasons	W-L-T	Pct
1888–1891	None	4	12–6	.667
1892–1893	W. M. Phillips	2	6–6	.500
1894–1899	None	6	16–19	.457
1900–1901	W. H. Fox	2	19–10	.655
1902	Bill Priel	1	10–4–1	.714
1903–1904	J. C. Kelsey	2	15–16	.484
1905	Philip O'Neil	1	9–7	.563
1906–1914	Hugh Nicol	9	67–36	.650
1915–1916	B. P. Pattison	2	19–15	.559
1917, 1919–1935, 1945–1946	Ward Lambert	19	163–158–7	.508
1918	John Pierce	1	6–7	.462
1936–1942	Dutch Fehring	7	84–76–5	.525
1943–1944	C. S. Doan	2	15–16–1	.484
1947–1950	Mel Taube	4	52–40–3	.565
1951–1955	Hank Stram	5	53–58–2	.477
1956–1959	Paul Hoffman	4	52–49–2	.525
1960–1977	Joe Sexson	18	221–318–8	.410
1978–1991	Dave Alexander	14	407–378–7	.518
1992–1998	Steve Green	6	136–201–1	.404
1998	Bob Shepherd	1	21–20	.512
1999–2016	Doug Schreiber	18	485–489	.498
2017–2019	Mark Wasikowski	3	87–82	.515
2020–present	Greg Goff	7	177–150	.541
Totals	21 coaches	138	2,132–2,161–37	.497

== Yearly record ==
Record table
Season	Coach	Overall	Conference	Standing	Postseason
Independent (1888–1905)
1888	None	5–2			
1889	None	3–0			
1890	None	2–2			
1891	None	2–2			
1892	W. M. Phillips	2–2			
1893	W. M. Phillips	4–4			
1894	None	3–3			
1895	None	1–2			
1896	None	1–1			
1897	None	3–3			
1898	None	3–3			
1899	None	5–7			
1900	W. H. Fox	10–5			
1901	W. H. Fox	9–5			
1902	Bill Priel	10–4–1			
1903	J. C. Kelsey	3–8			
1904	J. C. Kelsey	12–8			
1905	Phil O'Neil	9–7			
Independent:		87–68–1			
Big Ten Conference (1906–present)
1906	Hugh Nicol	4–3	1–1	t–4th	
1907	Hugh Nicol	6–6	3–3	5th	
1908	Hugh Nicol	10–3	7–3	3rd	
1909	Hugh Nicol	11–2	7–2	1st	
1910	Hugh Nicol	9–3	5–3	2nd	
1911	Hugh Nicol	9–3	6–3	3rd	
1912	Hugh Nicol	5–5	4–5	4th	
1913	Hugh Nicol	6–5–1	4–5–1	4th	
1914	Hugh Nicol	7–6	5–6	4th	
1915	B. P. Pattison	7–8	4–7	6th	
1916	B. P. Pattison	12–7	8–4	5th	
1917	Ward Lambert	5–7	3–5	6th	
1918	John Pierce	6–7	1–5	t–6th	
1919	Ward Lambert	3–9	0–7	8th	
1920	Ward Lambert	6–10–1	2–9–1	6th	
1921	Ward Lambert	10–11	4–7	6th	
1922	Ward Lambert	12–10	7–5	4th	
1923	Ward Lambert	9–8	6–5	5th	
1924	Ward Lambert	9–7	5–5	6th	
1925	Ward Lambert	5–11	1–9	10th	
1926	Ward Lambert	11–4–2	7–4–1	t–3rd	
1927	Ward Lambert	9–5–1	5–5	t–4th	
1928	Ward Lambert	10–4	6–4	2nd	
1929	Ward Lambert	10–8	4–6	t–6th	
1930	Ward Lambert	7–9	3–7	t–7th	
1931	Ward Lambert	3–7	0–5	10th	
1932	Ward Lambert	8–5	6–4	t-3rd	
1933	Ward Lambert	6–6–1	4–3	6th	
1934	Ward Lambert	9–6–2	4–5–1	7th	
1935	Ward Lambert	12–13	3–9	10th	
1936	Dutch Fehring	6–21–1	1–10	t–8th	
1937	Dutch Fehring	12–14	2–9	10th	
1938	Dutch Fehring	14–10	6–5	t–3rd	
1939	Dutch Fehring	12–8–3	5–5	t–6th	
1940	Dutch Fehring	14–9	2–7	9th	
1941	Dutch Fehring	15–10–1	4–8	9th	
1942	Dutch Fehring	11–14	5–7	t–5th	
1943	C. S. Doan	9–5	1–5	7th	
1944	C. S. Doan	6–11–1	4–5	t–6th	
1945	Ward Lambert	9–12	3–10	9th	
1946	Ward Lambert	10–6	2–4	7th	
1947	Mel Taube	13–10	5–8	8th	
1948	Mel Taube	14–7–1	9–5	4th	
1949	Mel Taube	14–9–2	7–5	4th	
1950	Mel Taube	11–14	2–8	8th	
1951	Hank Stram	10–12–1	2–6	10th	
1952	Hank Stram	12–11	7–5	4th	
1953	Hank Stram	5–13	2–9	t–8th	
1954	Hank Stram	13–13	4–11	t–9th	
1955	Hank Stram	13–9–1	5–8	8th	
1956	Paul Hoffman	13–15	4–11	9th	
1957	Paul Hoffman	9–5–1	3–3	6th	
1958	Paul Hoffman	12–18	6–8	8th	
1959	Paul Hoffman	18–11–1	5–8–1	8th	
1960	Joe Sexson	12–8–1	4–4–1	6th	
1961	Joe Sexson	8–17	3–11	10th	
1962	Joe Sexson	14–14–1	4–11	9th	
1963	Joe Sexson	16–14	5–10	9th	
1964	Joe Sexson	15–10	8–7	t–4th	
1965	Joe Sexson	14–11–2	5–7	t–7th	
1966	Joe Sexson	9–14–3	2–9–1	9th	
1967	Joe Sexson	14–18	7–9	7th	
1968	Joe Sexson	4–21–1	0–12	10th	
1969	Joe Sexson	9–20	7–11	t–8th	
1970	Joe Sexson	16–18	8–10	t–6th	
1971	Joe Sexson	17–20	6–12	7th	
1972	Joe Sexson	11–18	3–9	9th	
1973	Joe Sexson	8–26	2–16	10th	
1974	Joe Sexson	14–18	4–10	10th	
1975	Joe Sexson	7–24	1–15	10th	
1976	Joe Sexson	19–20	5–9	8th	
1977	Joe Sexson	14–27	2–16	10th	
1978	Dave Alexander	16–26	3–13	10th	
1979	Dave Alexander	19–30	6–12	7th	
1980	Dave Alexander	27–24	7–9	5th	
1981	Dave Alexander	30–30–1	8–6–1	2nd (East)	Big Ten Tournament
1982	Dave Alexander	36–23	6–10	t–3rd (East)	
1983	Dave Alexander	22–33–2	5–11	4th (East)	
1984	Dave Alexander	29–26–2	6–10	5th (East)	
1985	Dave Alexander	33–25	8–8	t–2nd (East)	
1986	Dave Alexander	37–27	9–7	2nd (East)	Big Ten Tournament
1987	Dave Alexander	36–24–1	10–6	2nd (East)	NCAA Regional
1988	Dave Alexander	26–34	6–22	10th	
1989	Dave Alexander	34–25	11–17	8th	
1990	Dave Alexander	27–30–1	8–18–1	8th	
1991	Dave Alexander	35–21	14–14	6th	
1992	Steve Green	30–24	13–15	6th	
1993	Steve Green	36–22	16–12	3rd	Big Ten Tournament
1994	Steve Green	16–39	8–20	10th	
1995	Steve Green	27–30	15–13	t–3rd	Big Ten Tournament
1996	Steve Green	22–32–1	8–19	9th	
1997	Steve Green	30–25	17–11	t–3rd	Big Ten Tournament
1998	Steve Green/Bob Shepherd	23–29	9–18	10th	
1999	Doug Schreiber	24–30	10–17	t–7th	
2000	Doug Schreiber	35–23	17–11	t–3rd	Big Ten Tournament
2001	Doug Schreiber	32–24	19–7	2nd	Big Ten Tournament
2002	Doug Schreiber	24–32	13–19	9th	
2003	Doug Schreiber	29–26	13–18	7th	
2004	Doug Schreiber	29–28	17–14	5th	Big Ten Tournament
2005	Doug Schreiber	27–30	17–11	2nd	Big Ten Tournament
2006	Doug Schreiber	31–27	15–17	t–5th	Big Ten Tournament
2007	Doug Schreiber	22–32	11–20	8th	
2008	Doug Schreiber	32–26	21–10	2nd	Big Ten Tournament
2009	Doug Schreiber	25–26	11–12	6th	Big Ten tournament
2010	Doug Schreiber	33–24	12–12	t–5th	Big Ten tournament
2011	Doug Schreiber	37–20	14–10	3rd	Big Ten tournament
2012	Doug Schreiber	45–14	17–7	1st	NCAA Regional
2013	Doug Schreiber	17–34	6–18	10th	
2014	Doug Schreiber	13–37	6–18	10th	
2015	Doug Schreiber	20–34	6–18	13th	
2016	Doug Schreiber	10–44	2–22	13th	
2017	Mark Wasikowski	29–27	12–12	8th	Big Ten tournament
2018	Mark Wasikowski	38–21	17–6	2nd	NCAA Regional
2019	Mark Wasikowski	20–34	7–16	12th	
2020	Greg Goff	7-7	0-0		Season canceled by NCAA†
2021	Greg Goff	16-26	16-26	12th	
2022	Greg Goff	29-21	9-12	7th	Big Ten tournament
2023	Greg Goff	24-29	11-13	9th	
2024	Greg Goff	33-24	13-11	6th	Big Ten tournament
2025	Greg Goff	31–23	11–19	15th	
2026	Greg Goff	37–20	18–12	5th	Big Ten tournament
Big Ten Conference:		2072–2105–37	831–1168–9		
Total:		2159–2173–38			
National champion Postseason invitational champion Conference regular season champion Conference regular season and conference tournament champion Division regular season champion Division regular season and conference tournament champion Conference tournament champion

†NCAA canceled all postseason activities for all college sports due to the COVID-19 virus.

== Notable former players ==
Below is a list of notable former Boilermakers and the seasons in which they played for Purdue.

Clyde Goodwin, the program's first Major League Baseball player

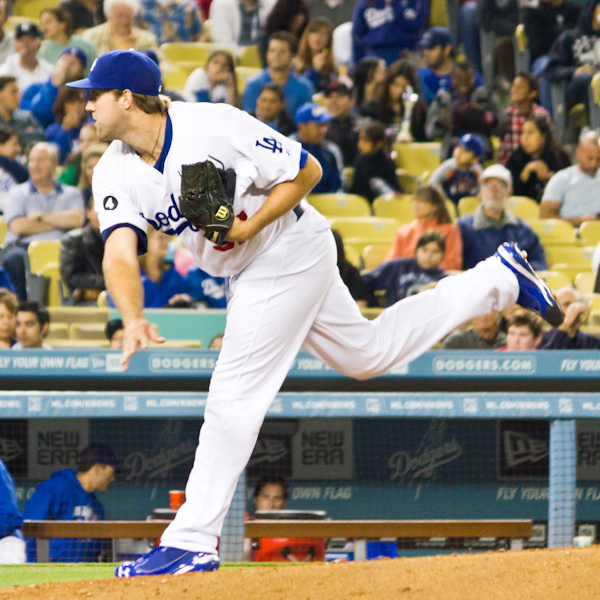
Josh Lindblom, who played for the program from 2007 to 2008

- Clyde Goodwin (1905–1906)
- Walt Tragesser (1908–1909)
- Frank Sigafoos (1923–1926)
- Hughie Wise (1926–1927)
- George Van Bibber (1929–1930)
- Dutch Fehring (1932–1934)
- Felix Mackiewicz (1938–1940)
- Bulbs Ehlers (1943, 1946)
- Bob Kelly (1946–1947)
- Bill "Moose" Skowron (1950)
- Joe McCabe (1958–1960)
- Bernie Allen (1959–1961)
- Matt Kinzer (1982–1984)
- Rico Rossy (1982–1985)
- Archi Cianfrocco (1987)
- Jermaine Allensworth (1991–1993)
- Dave Gassner (1998–2001)
- Jay Buente (2003–2006)
- Josh Lindblom (2007–2008)
- Cameron Perkins (2010–2012)
- Kevin Plawecki (2010–2012)
- Nick Wittgren (2011–2012)

=== 2012 MLB draft ===
In the 2012 Major League Baseball draft, a program-record seven Purdue players were selected: C Kevin Plawecki by the New York Mets (1st round), 3B Cameron Perkins by the Philadelphia Phillies (6th round), P Nick Wittgren by the Miami Marlins (9th round), P Lance Breedlove by the Pittsburgh Pirates (23rd round), 2B Eric Charles by the San Diego Padres (29th round), OF Barrett Serrato by the Texas Rangers (30th round), and P Brad Schreiber by the Minnesota Twins (40th round). P Blake Mascarello signed with the Phillies as an undrafted free agent. Mascarello, along with six of the seven draftees (all but Schreiber) signed professional contracts.

== See also ==
- List of NCAA Division I baseball programs
