= Oregon Ducks baseball =

NCAA Division 1 college baseball team

- 2026 Oregon Ducks baseball team
- Founded: 1877, 149 years ago
- University: University of Oregon
- Head coach: Mark Wasikowski (7th season)
- Conference: Big Ten
- Location: Eugene, Oregon
- Home stadium: PK Park (capacity: 5,000)
- Nickname: Ducks
- Colors: Green and yellow

College World Series appearances
- 1954

NCAA regional champions
- 2012, 2023, 2024, 2026

NCAA tournament appearances
- 1954, 1964, 2010, 2012, 2013, 2014, 2015, 2021, 2022, 2023, 2024, 2025, 2026

Conference tournament champions
- 2023

Conference regular season champions
- 1918, 1928, 1934, 1935, 1937, 1939, 1941, 1942, 1943, 1946, 1953, 1954, 1955, 1957, 2025

The Oregon Ducks baseball team represents the University of Oregon in NCAA Division I college baseball in the Big Ten Conference. The home games are played on campus at PK Park.

== History ==
Oregon played its first baseball game in 1877 and established the program in 1885.

The UO team made one College World Series appearance, in 1954, and was eliminated from the tournament after losing to Arizona and Massachusetts. A decade later in 1964, in the re-organized Athletic Association of Western Universities, Oregon was once again North Division champions, but lost at defending national champion USC in the district finals (today's super-regionals).

After the 1981 season, baseball and three other varsity sports were dropped by the university (men's gymnastics, women's golf, and women's soccer) due to a budget crisis, and baseball became a club sport in March 1983.

In July 2007, the university announced that it would again field a varsity baseball team, beginning with the 2009 season. One reason was the success of the rival Oregon State Beavers, who had repeated as College World Series champions a month earlier.

In the Ducks' first game in PK Park, they defeated the defending national champions, the Fresno State Bulldogs, 1–0 on a walk-off single by senior Andrew Schmidt. A sellout crowd of 2,777 was on hand for the game. After his eleventh season in 2019, head coach George Horton and the Ducks mutually agreed to part ways on May 28. Two weeks later on June 11, it was announced that Mark Wasikowski was the successor; he was previously an assistant at Oregon from 2012 through 2016, then was the head coach at Purdue in the Big Ten Conference. In his first full season as head coach of the Ducks, they hosted a regional as the 13th seed and finished second behind LSU.

== Stadium ==
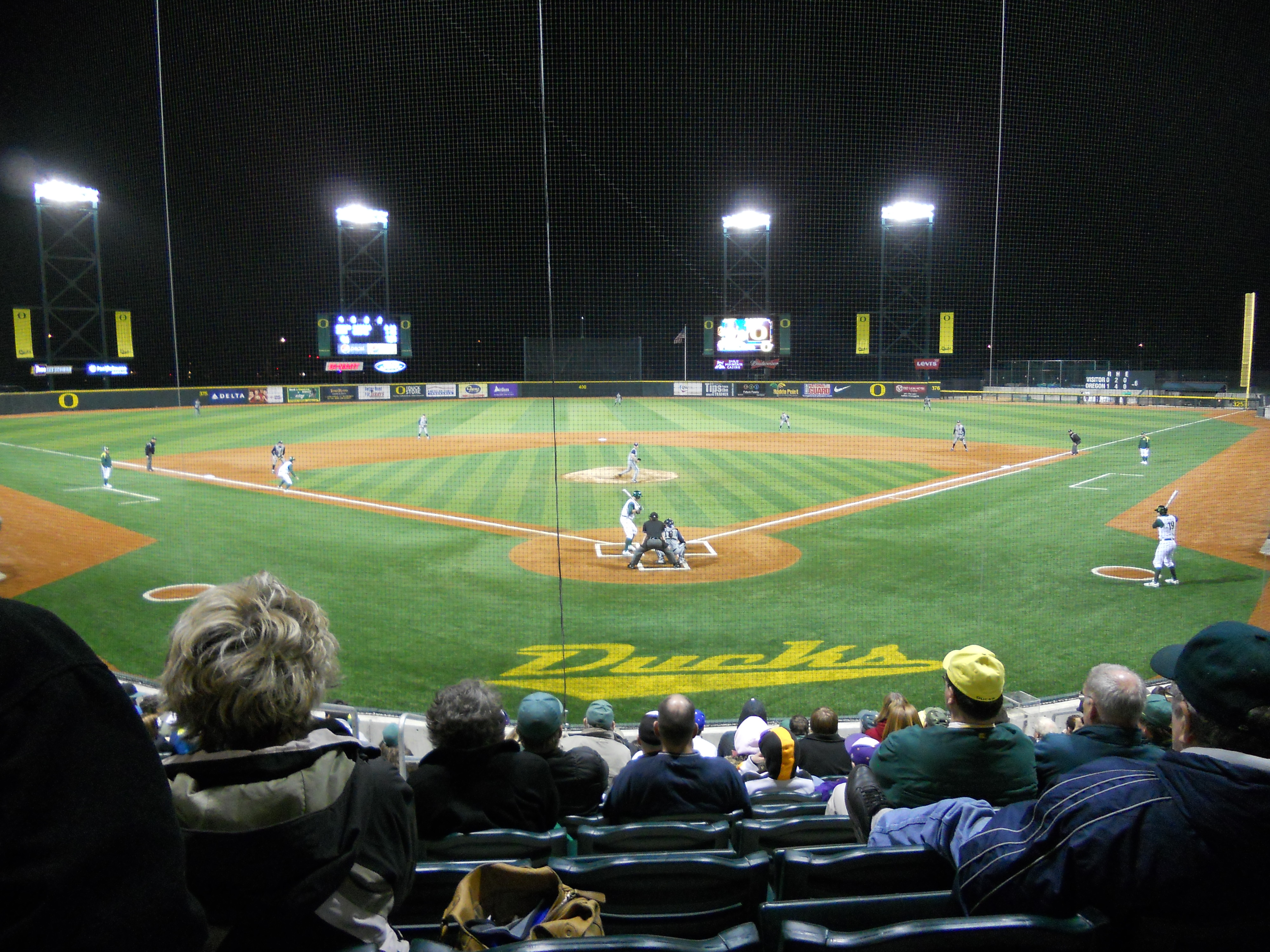
Hosting BYU in March 2011

The Ducks previously played baseball at Howe Field (44.041°N 123.074°W), south of McArthur Court, named in 1936 for Dr. Herbert Crombie Howe (1872–1940), the former chairman of the English department. Howe started teaching at UO in 1901 and was its original faculty representative to the Pacific Coast Conference in 1915, partially responsible for the league's founding. When the university dropped baseball after the 1981 season, the succeeding club team continued at Howe; in 1987, the field was converted to use by the softball team and later remodeled and renamed Jane Sanders Stadium. Softball was formerly played at Amazon Park, a city-owned park in Eugene.

Baseball became a club sport in 1983 and Oregon was the only Pac-10 school without a varsity baseball program through 2008. Following the reinstatement of baseball, announced in 2007, the university built PK Park, directly northeast of Autzen Stadium, formerly paved parking spaces. It opened for the Ducks in 2009 and since 2010, the park is also home for the minor league Eugene Emeralds of the High-A Northwest League, whose season runs from April through early-September.

== Yearly Awards ==
=== Pac-12 Player of the Year ===
- Aaron Zavala (2021)

=== Pac-12 Pitcher of the Year ===
- Alex Keudell (2011)

=== Big Ten Coach of the Year ===
- Mark Wasikowski (2025)

== Yearly results ==
Oregon notes their first year of baseball as 1877, with 1906 as the first recorded season.

| Year | Coach | Record | Notes |
|---|---|---|---|
| 1906 | J. B. Knapp | | |
| 1907 | Hugo Bezdek | | |
| 1908 | H. B. Leonard | | |
| 1909 | Tom Kelly | 6–3–1 | |
| 1910 | Tom Kelly | 6–4–1 | |
| 1911 | Tom Kelly | 9–6 | |
| 1912 | Homer Jamison | 8–0 | |
| 1913 | Homer Jamison | | |
| 1914 | Hugo Bezdek | 11–3 | |
| 1915 | Hugo Bezdek | 6–3 | |
| 1916 | Hugo Bezdek | 5–4 | |
| 1917 | Hugo Bezdek | | |
| 1918 | Dean Walker | 10–2 | |
| 1919 | Shy Huntington | 1–6 | |
| 1920 | Shy Huntington | 11–9 | |
| 1921 | George Bohler | 6–13 | |
| 1922 | George Bohler | 2–15 | |
| 1923 | George Bohler | 3–15 | |
| 1924 | Bill Reinhart | 6–12–1 | |
| 1925 | Bill Reinhart | 5–7 | |
| 1926 | Bill Reinhart | 4–4 | |
| 1927 | Bill Reinhart | 3–9 | |
| 1928 | Bill Reinhart | 11–4 | |
| 1929 | Bill Reinhart | 8–9 | |
| 1930 | Bill Reinhart | 15–7 | |
| 1931 | Bill Reinhart | 8–10 | |
| 1932 | Bill Reinhart | 5–10 | |
| 1933 | Bill Reinhart | 7–6 | |
| 1934 | Bill Reinhart | 16–6 | |
| 1935 | Bill Reinhart | 14–8 | |
| 1936 | Howard Hobson | 13–11 | |
| 1937 | Howard Hobson | 13–3 | |
| 1938 | Howard Hobson | 17–9 | |
| 1939 | Howard Hobson | 20–7 | |
| 1940 | Howard Hobson | 17–11 | |
| 1941 | Howard Hobson | 15–6 | |
| 1942 | Howard Hobson | 20–5 | |
| 1943 | Howard Hobson | 15–7 | |
| 1944 | Howard Hobson | | |
| 1945 | Howard Hobson | | |
| 1946 | Howard Hobson | 18–9–1 | |
| 1947 | Howard Hobson | 19–7 | |
| 1948 | Don Kirsch | 12–6 | |
| 1949 | Don Kirsch | 18–7 | |
| 1950 | Don Kirsch | 12–11 | |
| 1951 | Don Kirsch | 14–14 | |
| 1952 | Don Kirsch | 19–12 | |
| 1953 | Don Kirsch | 15–4 | |
| 1954 | Don Kirsch | 18–8 | 11–5 in PCC North Div., 1st place, District 8 champion (now super regional), College World Series, 7th (tie) |
| 1955 | Don Kirsch | 18–8 | |
| 1956 | Don Kirsch | 18–8 | |
| 1957 | Don Kirsch | 24–9–1 | |
| 1958 | Don Kirsch | 19–8 | |
| 1959 | Don Kirsch | 19–11 | |
| 1960 | Don Kirsch | 12–7 | |
| 1961 | Don Kirsch | 19–9 | |
| 1962 | Don Kirsch | 29–9–1 | |
| 1963 | Don Kirsch | 25–7 | |
| 1964 | Don Kirsch | 31–11 | 11–5 in AAWU North Div., 1st place, runner-up in District 8 (now super regional) |
| 1965 | Don Kirsch | 27–8–1 | |
| 1966 | Don Kirsch | 21–18 | |
| 1967 | Don Kirsch | 16–14 | |
| 1968 | Don Kirsch | 25–15–1 | |
| 1969 | Don Kirsch | 22–19 | |
| 1970 | Don Kirsch | | |
| 1971 | Mel Krause | 19–18 | |
| 1972 | Mel Krause | 24–13 | |
| 1973 | Mel Krause | 23–13 | |
| 1974 | Mel Krause | 26–19 | |
| 1975 | Mel Krause | 20–19 | |
| 1976 | Mel Krause | 20–18 | |
| 1977 | Mel Krause | 14–27 | |
| 1978 | Mel Krause | 23–24 | |
| 1979 | Mel Krause | 29–27–1 | |
| 1980 | Mel Krause | 19–21 | |
| 1981 | Mel Krause | 16–21 | does not include 2 wins vs. Lane CC – dropped program |
No varsity team from 1982–2008 (27 seasons), club sport only
| 2009 | George Horton | 14–42 | 4–23 in Pac-10, 10th place |
| 2010 | George Horton | 40–24 | 13–14 in Pac-10, 5th place (tie), second at Regional |
| 2011 | George Horton | 33–26 | 11–16 in Pac-10, 8th place |
| 2012 | George Horton | 46–19 | 19–11 in Pac-12, 3rd place, #5 overall seed, hosted Regional and Super Regional |
| 2013 | George Horton | 48–16 | 22–8 in Pac-12, 2nd place, #8 overall seed, hosted Regional |
| 2014 | George Horton | 44–20 | 18–12 in Pac-12, 4th place, second at Regional |
| 2015 | George Horton | 38–25 | 16–14 in Pac-12, 6th place, third at Regional |
| 2016 | George Horton | 29–26 | 14–16 in Pac-12, 8th place (tie) |
| 2017 | George Horton | 30–25 | 12–18 in Pac-12, 8th place |
| 2018 | George Horton | 26–29 | 12–18 in Pac-12, 8th place (tie) |
| 2019 | George Horton | 27–29 | 10–19 in Pac-12, 9th place |
| 2020 | Mark Wasikowski | 8–7 | 0–0 in Pac-12, *Season cancelled due to COVID-19 |
| 2021 | Mark Wasikowski | 39–16 | 20–10 in Pac-12, 2nd Place, #14 overall seed, hosted Regional |
| 2022 | Mark Wasikowski | 36–25 | 18–12 in Pac-12, 4th place, third at Regional |
| 2023 | Mark Wasikowski | 41–22 | 16–14 in Pac-12, 6th Place, hosted Super Regional |
| 2024 | Mark Wasikowski | 40–20 | 19–11 in Pac-12, 3rd Place, Super Regional |
| 2025 | Mark Wasikowski | 42–16 | 22–8 in Big Ten, 1st Place, #12 overall seed, hosted Regional |
| 2026 | Mark Wasikowski | 43–18 | 20–10 in Big Ten, 3rd Place, #11 overall seed, Super Regional |

== Oregon in the Pac-12 tournament ==
| Year | Record | Pct | Seed | Notes |
|---|---|---|---|---|
| 2022 | 0-2 | .000 | 4th | |
| 2023 | 4-0 | 1.000 | 6th | Tournament Champions |
| 2024 | 0-2 | .000 | 4th | |

== Oregon in the Big Ten tournament ==
| Year | Record | Pct | Seed | Notes |
|---|---|---|---|---|
| 2025 | 1-1 | .500 | 1st | |
| 2026 | 2-1 | .667 | 3rd | |

== Oregon in the NCAA tournament ==
- The NCAA Division I baseball tournament started in 1947.
- The format of the tournament has changed through the years.

| Year | Record | Pct | Nat'l seed | Notes |
|---|---|---|---|---|
| 1954 | 3–2 | .600 | | District 8 champion, College World Series (7th) |
| 1964 | 0–2 | .000 | | District 8 runner-up (super regional) |
| 2010 | 2–2 | .500 | | finished second in Regional |
| 2012 | 4–2 | .667 | 5 | Regional and Super Regional host |
| 2013 | 3–2 | .600 | 8 | Regional host |
| 2014 | 2–2 | .500 | | finished second in Regional |
| 2015 | 1–2 | .333 | | finished third in Regional |
| 2021 | 2–2 | .500 | 14 | Regional host |
| 2022 | 1–2 | .333 | | finished third in Regional |
| 2023 | 4–2 | .667 | | Super Regional host |
| 2024 | 3–2 | .600 | | Super Regional |
| 2025 | 0–2 | .000 | 12 | finished fourth in Regional |
| 2026 | 3–2 | .600 | 11 | Super Regional |
| TOTALS | 28–26 | .519 | | |

== Former players ==
- Robby Ahlstrom
- Tyler Anderson
- Earl Averill Jr.
- Steve Baker
- Carson Bigbee
- Garrett Cleavinger
- Jonny DeLuca
- Tom Dodd
- Kyle Garlick
- Joe Gordon, Hall of Famer as a second baseman
- Ryon Healy
- Scott Heineman
- Cole Irvin
- Josh Kasevich
- Matt Krook
- Scott McGough
- Ryne Nelson
- Rikuu Nishida
- Stephen Nogosek
- David Peterson
- Jake Reed
- Don Reynolds
- Dave Roberts
- Jimmie Sherfy
- Ray Smith
- Spencer Steer
- Zack Thornton
- Kenyon Yovan
- Aaron Zavala

== See also ==
- List of NCAA Division I baseball programs
