= 2026 Nebraska Cornhuskers baseball team =

College baseball team season

2026 Nebraska Cornhuskers baseball

MLB Desert Invitational champions

NCAA Lincoln Regional, 1–2
- Conference: Big Ten Conference

Ranking
- Coaches: No. 22
- Record: 43–17 (23–7 Big Ten)
- Head coach: Will Bolt (7th season)
- Assistant coach: Lance Harvell (7th season)
- Hitting coach: Mike Sirianni (3rd season)
- Pitching coach: Rob Childress (3rd season)
- Home stadium: Haymarket Park

2026 Big Ten Conference baseball standings
	Conf.						Overall
Team	W		L		T	PCT	W		L		T	PCT
No. 11 UCLA ‍†‍‡‍^{y}	28	–	2	–	0	.933	48	–	6	–	0	.889
Nebraska ‍‍‍^{y}	23	–	7	–	0	.767	41	–	14	–	0	.745
No. 13 Oregon ‍‍‍^{y}	20	–	10	–	0	.667	38	–	15	–	0	.717
No. 15 USC ‍‍‍^{y}	20	–	10	–	0	.667	42	–	14	–	0	.750
Purdue ‍‍‍	18	–	13	–	0	.581	36	–	18	–	0	.667
Ohio State ‍‍‍	18	–	12	–	0	.600	29	–	24	–	0	.547
Michigan ‍‍‍	17	–	13	–	0	.567	33	–	22	–	0	.600
Iowa ‍‍‍	15	–	15	–	0	.500	30	–	21	–	0	.588
Illinois ‍‍‍	14	–	16	–	0	.467	27	–	27	–	0	.500
Rutgers ‍‍‍	13	–	17	–	0	.433	26	–	29	–	0	.473
Washington ‍‍‍	12	–	18	–	0	.400	23	–	31	–	0	.426
Michigan State ‍‍‍	12	–	19	–	0	.387	22	–	31	–	0	.415
Minnesota ‍‍‍	11	–	19	–	0	.367	30	–	23	–	0	.566
Maryland ‍‍‍	9	–	21	–	0	.300	27	–	29	–	0	.482
Indiana ‍‍‍	9	–	21	–	0	.300	23	–	31	–	0	.426
Penn State ‍‍‍	9	–	21	–	0	.300	16	–	35	–	0	.314
Northwestern ‍‍‍	8	–	22	–	0	.267	21	–	30	–	1	.413
† – Conference champion ‡ – Tournament champion y – Invited to the NCAA tournament As of May 19, 2026; Rankings from D1Baseball

The 2026 Nebraska Cornhuskers baseball team represented the University of Nebraska–Lincoln during the 2026 NCAA Division I baseball season. The Cornhuskers were led by head coach Will Bolt in his seventh season, and were members of the Big Ten Conference. The Huskers played their home games at Haymarket Park in Lincoln, Nebraska.

== Previous season ==
Nebraska finished the 2025 season with 33–29 (15–15 Big Ten) record. The Huskers won the 2025 Big Ten Conference baseball tournament securing the conference's automatic berth into the 2025 NCAA Division I baseball tournament. There, the Huskers were placed as the three-seed in the Chapel Hill Regional, where they went 1–2.

== Preseason ==
=== Preseason Big Ten awards and honors ===
Preseason awards will be announced in January or February 2025.

Preseason Big Ten Players to Watch
Player	Position	Year	Ref.
Jett Buck	INF	Senior	
Ty Horn	RHP	Junior	
Case Sanderson	INF	Junior	

=== Coaches poll ===
The coaches poll was released on February 11, 2026. Only the top six teams are publicly revealed. Nebraska was selected to finish fourth in the conference.

Coaches' Poll
Predicted finish	Team
1	UCLA
2	Oregon
3	USC
4	Nebraska
5	Indiana
6	Iowa

== Personnel ==
=== Starters ===
Lineup
Pos.	No.	Player.	Year
C	0	Jeter Worthley	Freshman
1B	14	Case Sanderson	Junior
2B	1	Jett Buck	Senior
SS	15	Dylan Carey	Junior
3B	4	Joshua Overbeek	Senior
LF	10	Drew Grego	Freshman
CF	17	Mac Moyer	Junior
RF	11	Max Buettenback	Junior
DH	13	Will Jesske	Junior

Weekend pitching rotation
Day	No.	Player.	Year
Friday	2	Ty Horn	Junior
Saturday	39	Carson Jasa	RS Sophomore
Sunday	50	Gavin Blachowicz	Sophomore

=== Roster ===
2026 Nebraska Cornhuskers baseball team
Players
Coaches

#	Pos.	Name	B/T	Height	Weight	Year	Home town
0	C	Jeter Worthley	R/R	5 ft 11 in (1.8 m)	190 lb (86 kg)	Fr	Lincoln, NE
1	INF	Jett Buck	R/R	5 ft 11 in (1.8 m)	185 lb (84 kg)	Sr	Kansas City, MO
2	RHP	Ty Horn	L/R	6 ft 2 in (1.88 m)	190 lb (86 kg)	Jr	Halstead, KS
4	INF	Joshua Overbeek	S/R	6 ft 1 in (1.85 m)	215 lb (98 kg)	Gr	Cincinnati, OH
5	INF	Nico Newhan	R/R	5 ft 11 in (1.8 m)	190 lb (86 kg)	RS So	San Diego, CA
6	RHP	Pryce Bender	R/R	6 ft 4 in (1.93 m)	190 lb (86 kg)	So	Edmond, OK
9	INF	Rhett Stokes	R/R	5 ft 10 in (1.78 m)	190 lb (86 kg)	Gr	Roswell, NM
10	OF	Drew Grego	R/R	6 ft 0 in (1.83 m)	195 lb (88 kg)	Fr	Papillion, NE
11	UTL	Max Buettenback	L/R	6 ft 2 in (1.88 m)	215 lb (98 kg)	Jr	Lincoln, NE
12	INF	Cole Kitchens	R/R	6 ft 4 in (1.93 m)	220 lb (100 kg)	Sr	Centerton, AR
13	UTL	Will Jesske	R/R	5 ft 11 in (1.8 m)	210 lb (95 kg)	Jr	Lincoln, NE
14	UTL	Case Sanderson	L/L	6 ft 3 in (1.91 m)	210 lb (95 kg)	Jr	Nevada, MO
15	INF	Dylan Carey	R/R	6 ft 2 in (1.88 m)	210 lb (95 kg)	Sr	Castle Rock, CO
16	INF	Devin Nunez	L/R	5 ft 10 in (1.78 m)	180 lb (82 kg)	So	Navasota, TX
17	OF	Mac Moyer	L/L	6 ft 1 in (1.85 m)	195 lb (88 kg)	Jr	Washougal, WA
18	OF	Preston Freeman	L/R	6 ft 2 in (1.88 m)	190 lb (86 kg)	RS Jr	Floresville, TX
19	RHP	Cooper Katskee	R/R	6 ft 4 in (1.93 m)	220 lb (100 kg)	RS Jr	Greenwood Village, CO
20	RHP	Kevin Mannell	R/R	6 ft 4 in (1.93 m)	220 lb (100 kg)	RS Sr	Topeka, KS
21	C	Trey Fikes	R/R	5 ft 10 in (1.78 m)	195 lb (88 kg)	Jr	Steele, MO
23	RHP	Blake Encarnacion	R/R	6 ft 4 in (1.93 m)	210 lb (95 kg)	So	Friendswood, TX
24	LHP	Caleb Clark	L/L	6 ft 2 in (1.88 m)	210 lb (95 kg)	Sr	Orillia, ON
25	INF	Reed Strohmeyer	L/R	6 ft 2 in (1.88 m)	190 lb (86 kg)	Fr	Dubuque, IA
26	C	Miken Miller	L/R	5 ft 10 in (1.78 m)	195 lb (88 kg)	Jr	Otsego, MN
27	INF	Joey Senstock	R/R	6 ft 1 in (1.85 m)	200 lb (91 kg)	Fr	Lincoln, NE
28	LHP	Braxton Stewart	L/L	6 ft 4 in (1.93 m)	185 lb (84 kg)	RS So	Winston-Salem, NC
30	INF	Carter Kelley	R/R	6 ft 6 in (1.98 m)	235 lb (107 kg)	Jr	North Platte, NE
31	RHP	Auden Pankonin	R/R	6 ft 4 in (1.93 m)	205 lb (93 kg)	Fr	Hudson, WI
32	RHP	Tucker Timmerman	R/R	6 ft 3 in (1.91 m)	215 lb (98 kg)	Jr	Beatrice, NE
33	RHP	Jace Ziola	R/R	6 ft 2 in (1.88 m)	200 lb (91 kg)	Fr	Elkhorn, NE
34	RHP	Carter Kutz	R/R	6 ft 3 in (1.91 m)	205 lb (93 kg)	Fr	Hartford, WI
35	RHP	Ryan Harrahill	R/R	6 ft 4 in (1.93 m)	220 lb (100 kg)	Jr	Elkhorn, NE
36	LHP	Grant Cleavinger	L/L	6 ft 5 in (1.96 m)	220 lb (100 kg)	Sr	Lawrence, KS
37	RHP	J'Shawn Unger	R/R	6 ft 5 in (1.96 m)	220 lb (100 kg)	So	Blair, NE
38	LHP	Lynden Bruegman	L/L	6 ft 2 in (1.88 m)	215 lb (98 kg)	Sr	Lincoln, NE
39	RHP	Carson Jasa	R/R	6 ft 7 in (2.01 m)	215 lb (98 kg)	RS So	Thornton, CO
41	LHP	Chase Olson	L/L	5 ft 11 in (1.8 m)	175 lb (79 kg)	RS Fr	Raymore, MO
42	LHP	Jalen Worthley	L/L	5 ft 11 in (1.8 m)	180 lb (82 kg)	Sr	Lincoln, NE
43	RHP	Cooper Grace	R/R	6 ft 3 in (1.91 m)	215 lb (98 kg)	Fr	Wakarusa, KS
44	RHP	Blake Sebastian	R/R	6 ft 5 in (1.96 m)	225 lb (102 kg)	Fr	Leawood, KS
47	LHP	Colin Nowaczyk	L/L	6 ft 1 in (1.85 m)	200 lb (91 kg)	So	Elkhorn, NE
50	RHP	Gavin Blachowicz	L/R	6 ft 4 in (1.93 m)	210 lb (95 kg)	So	Olathe, KS

Head coach

7 Will Bolt

Assistant coach(es)

29 Rob Childress (Pitching & catching)
22 Lance Harvell (Outfielders)
3 Mike Sirianni (Hitting & infielders)

Legend

- (C) Team captain
- (S) Suspended
- (I) Ineligible
- Injured
- Current redshirt

Roster
Last update: April 23, 2026

== Game log ==
2026 Nebraska Cornhuskers baseball game log (43–17)
Regular season (41–14)

February (5–4)
Date	TV	Opponent	Rank	Stadium	Score	Win	Loss	Save	Attendance	Record	B1G
MLB Desert Invitational
February 13	MLBN	vs. UConn*		Salt River Fields at Talking Stick; Scottsdale, AZ	W 12–2^{(7)}	Clark (1–0)	West (0–1)	—	275	1–0	—
February 14	MLBN	vs. Northeastern*		Sloan Park; Mesa, AZ	W 7–4	Jasa (1–0)	Rising (0–1)	Mannell (1)	999	2–0	—
February 15	MLBN	vs. Grand Canyon*		Sloan Park	W 9–1	Olson (1–0)	Frey (0–1)	—	876	3–0	—
February 16	MLBN	vs. Stanford*		Salt River Fields at Talking Stick	L 6–11	Gomez (2–0)	Nowaczyk (0–1)	—	1,535	3–1	—
Amegy Bank College Baseball Series
February 20		vs. No. 15 Louisville*		Globe Life Field; Arlington, TX	L 2–4	Brown (1–0)	Clark (1–1)	England (1)	3,219	3–2	—
February 21		vs. Kansas State*		Globe Life Field	L 3–5	Liggett (1–0)	Unger (0–1)	—	3,702	3–3	—
February 22		vs. No. 16 Florida State*		Globe Life Field	W 10–1	Blachowicz (1–0)	Manca (0–1)	—	3,374	4–3	—
February 27	SECN+	at No. 7 Auburn*		Plainsman Park; Auburn, AL	W 9–8^{(10)}	Unger (1–1)	Brewer (0–1)	Bender (1)	6,000	5–3	—
February 28	SECN+	at No. 7 Auburn*		Plainsman Park	L 4–15^{(7)}	Chatterton (1–0)	Jasa (1–1)	—	6,687	5–4	—

March (17–2)
Date	TV	Opponent	Rank	Stadium	Score	Win	Loss	Save	Attendance	Record	B1G
March 1	ESPN+	at No. 7 Auburn*		Plainsman Park	L 3–12	Petrovic (3–0)	Blachowicz (1–1)	—	5,411	5–5	—
March 3	B1G+	Omaha*		Haymarket Park; Lincoln, NE	W 8–5	Katskee (1–0)	Riggs (1–1)	Unger (1)	3,934	6–5	—
March 4	B1G+	South Dakota State*		Haymarket Park	W 5–4	Mannell (1–0)	Rylance (0–1)	—	3,929	7–5	—
March 6	B1G+	Michigan State		Haymarket Park	W 5–4^{(10)}	Unger (2–1)	Greeley (0–1)	—	4,312	8–5	1–0
March 7	BTN	Michigan State		Haymarket Park	W 3–1	Jasa (2–1)	Monke (1–2)	Katskee (1)	5,007	9–5	2–0
March 8	B1G+	Michigan State		Haymarket Park	W 12–2^{(7)}	Blachowicz (2–1)	Pikur (0–3)	—	5,762	10–5	3–0
March 11	B1G+	North Dakota State*		Haymarket Park	W 11–1	Katskee (2–0)	Totten (0–2)	—	4,082	11–5	—
March 13	B1G+	Maine*		Haymarket Park	W 6–5	Unger (3–1)	Wheeler (0–2)	—	4,316	12–5	—
March 14	B1G+	Maine*		Haymarket Park	W 6–3	Jasa (3–1)	Larisa (0–2)	Katskee (2)	4,877	13–5	—
March 15	B1G+	Maine*		Haymarket Park	W 8–7	Worthley (1–0)	Wheeler (0–3)	—	5,073	14–5	—
March 17	ESPN+	at Wichita State*		Eck Stadium; Wichita, KS	W 8–1	Katskee (3–0)	Rogers (0–2)	Unger (2)	1,572	15–5	—
March 18	ESPN+	at Wichita State*		Eck Stadium	W 10–1	Timmerman (1–0)	Kortum (2–1)	—	2,121	16–5	—
March 20	B1G+	at Michigan		Ray Fisher Stadium; Ann Arbor, MI	L 1–2	Barr (3–2)	Horn (0–1)	Debiec (1)	808	16–6	3–1
March 21	B1G+	at Michigan		Ray Fisher Stadium	W 10–0^{(7)}	Jasa (4–1)	Lally Jr. (0–1)	—	1,207	17–6	4–1
March 22	BTN	at Michigan		Ray Fisher Stadium	W 9–5	Unger (4–1)	DeVooght (0–2)	—	848	18–6	5–1
March 24	B12N+	at Kansas State*	No. 24	Tointon Family Stadium; Manhattan, KS	W 14–9	Worthley (2–0)	Arnold (0–1)	—	2,344	19–6	—
March 27	B1G+	Indiana	No. 24	Haymarket Park	W 6–5	Horn (1–1)	Reagan (0–3)	Unger (3)	4,927	20–6	6–1
March 28	B1G+	Indiana	No. 24	Haymarket Park	W 12–7	Jasa (5–1)	Neubeck (2–3)	—	5,678	21–6	7–1
March 29	B1G+	Indiana	No. 24	Haymarket Park	W 12–4	Katskee (4–0)	Seebold (1–2)	—	5,682	22–6	8–1
March 31	BEDN	at Creighton*	No. 19	Charles Schwab Field Omaha; Omaha, NE	W 6–5	Blachowicz (3–1)	Koosman (0–3)	Unger (4)	4,197	23–6	—

April (12–5)
Date	TV	Opponent	Rank	Stadium	Score	Win	Loss	Save	Attendance	Record	B1G
April 3	B1G+	Penn State	No. 19	Haymarket Park	W 8–7	Timmerman (2–0)	Brown III (1–2)	Unger (5)	4,326	24–6	9–1
April 4	B1G+	Penn State	No. 19	Haymarket Park	W 13–1^{(7)}	Jasa (6–1)	Hudson (1–6)	—	4,997	25–6	10–1
April 5	B1G+	Penn State	No. 19	Haymarket Park	W 8–6	Katskee (5–0)	Shayter (1–5)	Unger (6)	4,985	26–6	11–1
April 7	B1G+	Kansas*	No. 19	Haymarket Park	L 3–5	West (3–0)	Clark (1–2)	Rahe (6)	4,402	26–7	—
April 10	BTN	at No. 21 Oregon	No. 19	PK Park; Eugene, OR	L 6–7	Sanford (5–1)	Timmerman (2–1)	Bell (8)	2,640	26–8	11–2
April 11	B1G+	at No. 21 Oregon	No. 19	PK Park	W 10–8	Clark (2–2)	Clarke (5–3)	Unger (7)	2,410	27–8	12–2
April 12	B1G+	at No. 21 Oregon	No. 19	PK Park	L 4–5	Bradley (3–0)	Cleavinger (0–1)	Bell (9)	2,701	27–9	12–3
April 14	B1G+	Creighton*		Haymarket Park	W 5–4	Timmerman (3–1)	Stratton (2–1)	Unger (8)	6,148	28–9	—
April 17	B1G+	No. 12 USC		Haymarket Park	W 8–7^{(10)}	Unger (5–1)	Matson (1–1)	—	6,271	29–9	13–3
April 18	B1G+	No. 12 USC		Haymarket Park	W 12–2^{(7)}	Jasa (7–1)	Govel (7–1)	—	7,602	30–9	14–3
April 19	BTN	No. 12 USC		Haymarket Park	W 16–6^{(8)}	Horn (2–1)	Johnson (3–2)	—	7,510	31–9	15–3
April 21	B12N	at No. 16 Kansas*	No. 20	Hoglund Ballpark; Lawrence, KS	L 7–9	Scheidt (2–1)	Horn (2–2)	Rahe (7)	2,674	31–10	—
April 24	B1G+	at Illinois	No. 20	Illinois Field; Champaign, IL	L 5–10	Hall (6–4)	Katskee (5–1)	—	1,362	31–11	15–4
April 25	B1G+	at Illinois	No. 20	Illinois Field	W 12–5	Jasa (8–1)	Dye (1–1)	Unger (9)	1,482	32–11	16–4
April 26	B1G+	at Illinois	No. 20	Illinois Field	W 3–0	Blachowicz (4–1)	Flinn (0–2)	Horn (1)	1,052	33–11	17–4
April 28	B1G+	Kansas State*	No. 16	Haymarket Park	W 7–6	Unger (6–1)	Miles (2–4)	—	5,531	34–11	—

May (7–3)
Date	TV	Opponent	Rank	Stadium	Score	Win	Loss	Save	Attendance	Record	B1G
May 1	B1G+	at Ohio State	No. 16	Bill Davis Stadium; Columbus, OH	L 1–2	Kuzniewski (4–2)	Jasa (8–2)	Zamora (3)	955	34–12	17–5
May 2	BTN	at Ohio State	No. 16	Bill Davis Stadium	L 3–7	Domke (5–5)	Blachowicz (4–2)	—	977	34–13	17–6
May 3	B1G+	at Ohio State	No. 16	Bill Davis Stadium	L 1–10	Herrenbuck (5–3)	Katskee (5–2)	—	1,290	34–14	17–7
May 8	B1G+	Iowa	No. 25	Haymarket Park	W 10–0^{(8)}	Jasa (9–2)	Guerin (2–3)	None	7,094	35–14	18–7
May 9	B1G+	Iowa	No. 25	Haymarket Park	W 15–11	Nowaczyk (1–1)	Husak (1–1)	None	7,773	36–14	19–7
May 10	BTN	Iowa	No. 25	Haymarket Park	W 8–6	Nowaczyk (2–1)	Bleeker (5–5)	Timmerman (1)	7,948	37–14	20–7
May 12	B1G+	Creighton*	No. 24	Haymarket Park	W 8–4	Katskee (6–2)	Koosman (0–4)	None	10,095	38–14	—
May 14	B1G+	at Minnesota	No. 24	Siebert Field; Minneapolis, MN	W 12–7	Nowaczyk (3–1)	Urban (2–1)	None	258	39–14	21–7
May 15	B1G+	at Minnesota	No. 24	Siebert Field	W 7–6	Harrahill (1–0)	Kruzan (4–4)	Unger (10)	—	40–14	22–7
May 16	B1G+	at Minnesota	No. 24	Siebert Field	W 14–11	Bender (1–0)	Kruzan (4–5)	Unger (11)	—	41–14	23–7

Postseason (2–3)

B1G tournament (1–1)
Date	TV	Opponent	Rank	Stadium	Score	Win	Loss	Save	Attendance	Record	B1GT
May 22	BTN	vs. (7) Michigan (Quarterfinals)	(2); No. 20	Charles Schwab Field; Omaha, Neb	W 6–4	Horn (3–2)	Barr (5–6)	Unger (1)	7,035	42–14	1–0
May 23	BTN	vs. (3) No. 14 Oregon (Semifinals)	(2); No. 20	Charles Schwab Field	L 0–8	Sanford (8–2)	Blachowicz (4–3)	None	12,083	42–15	1–1

Lincoln Regional (1–2)
Date	TV	Opponent	Rank	Stadium	Score	Win	Loss	Save	Attendance	Record	NCAAT
May 29	ESPN+	(4) South Dakota State	(1); No. 20	Haymarket Park	W 4–1	Jasa (10–2)	Schlecht (4–5)	Unger (2)	7,828	43–15	1–0
May 31	ESPN+	(2) No. 18 Ole Miss	(1); No. 20	Haymarket Park	L 3–6	Rabe (5–3)	Horn (3–3)	Hudson (1)	7,835	43–16	1–1
May 31	ESPN	(3) No. 22 Arizona State	(1); No. 20	Haymarket Park	L 8–11	Guy (2–0)	Blachowicz (4–4)	Schaefer (1)	7,748	43–17	1–2

Legend: = Win = Loss = Canceled
Bold =Nebraska team member * Non-conference game
Rankings are based on the team's current ranking in the D1Baseball poll.

== Rankings ==
Ranking movements Legend: ██ Increase in ranking ██ Decrease in ranking — = Not ranked RV = Received votes
	Week																	
Poll	Pre	1	2	3	4	5	6	7	8	9	10	11	12	13	14	15	16	Final
Coaches'	RV	RV*	RV	—	RV	RV	RV	21	17	25	16	16	24	21	18	18	18*	22
Baseball America	—	—	—	—	—	—	—	24	20	—	20	18	—	—	21	21*	21*	20
NCBWA†	RV	RV	RV	—	—	RV	RV	20	14	24	20	17	RV	21	19	19*	RV	25
D1Baseball	—	—	—	—	—	—	24	19	19	—	20	16	25	24	20	20	20*	—
Perfect Game	—	—	—	—	—	—	22	20	14	22	14	14	21	19	15	15*	15*	23

† NCBWA ranks 30 teams in their preseason poll, but only ranks 25 teams weekly during the season.
* A new poll was not released for this week, so for comparison purposes, the previous week's ranking is inserted in this week's slot.
