= 2026 Purdue Boilermakers baseball team =

American college baseball season

2026 Purdue Boilermakers baseball
- Conference: Big Ten Conference
- Record: 37–20 (18–12 Big Ten)
- Head coach: Greg Goff (7th season)
- Assistant coach: Barrett Serrato (2nd season)
- Hitting coach: Jimmy Brenneman (1st season)
- Pitching coach: Josh Newman (3rd season)
- Home stadium: Alexander Field

2026 Big Ten Conference baseball standings
	Conf.						Overall
Team	W		L		T	PCT	W		L		T	PCT
No. 11 UCLA ‍†‍‡‍^{y}	28	–	2	–	0	.933	48	–	6	–	0	.889
Nebraska ‍‍‍^{y}	23	–	7	–	0	.767	41	–	14	–	0	.745
No. 13 Oregon ‍‍‍^{y}	20	–	10	–	0	.667	38	–	15	–	0	.717
No. 15 USC ‍‍‍^{y}	20	–	10	–	0	.667	42	–	14	–	0	.750
Purdue ‍‍‍	18	–	13	–	0	.581	36	–	18	–	0	.667
Ohio State ‍‍‍	18	–	12	–	0	.600	29	–	24	–	0	.547
Michigan ‍‍‍	17	–	13	–	0	.567	33	–	22	–	0	.600
Iowa ‍‍‍	15	–	15	–	0	.500	30	–	21	–	0	.588
Illinois ‍‍‍	14	–	16	–	0	.467	27	–	27	–	0	.500
Rutgers ‍‍‍	13	–	17	–	0	.433	26	–	29	–	0	.473
Washington ‍‍‍	12	–	18	–	0	.400	23	–	31	–	0	.426
Michigan State ‍‍‍	12	–	19	–	0	.387	22	–	31	–	0	.415
Minnesota ‍‍‍	11	–	19	–	0	.367	30	–	23	–	0	.566
Maryland ‍‍‍	9	–	21	–	0	.300	27	–	29	–	0	.482
Indiana ‍‍‍	9	–	21	–	0	.300	23	–	31	–	0	.426
Penn State ‍‍‍	9	–	21	–	0	.300	16	–	35	–	0	.314
Northwestern ‍‍‍	8	–	22	–	0	.267	21	–	30	–	1	.413
† – Conference champion ‡ – Tournament champion y – Invited to the NCAA tournament As of May 19, 2026; Rankings from D1Baseball

The 2026 Purdue Boilermakers baseball team is a baseball team that represents Purdue University in the 2026 NCAA Division I baseball season. The Boilermakers are members of the Big Ten Conference and play their home games at Alexander Field in West Lafayette, Indiana. They are led by seventh-year head coach Greg Goff.

== Previous season ==
The Boilermakers finished the 2025 NCAA Division I baseball season 31–23 overall (11–19 conference) and fifteenth place in the conference standings.

== Roster ==
2026 Purdue Boilermakers baseball team
Players
Coaches

#	Pos.	Name	B/T	Height	Weight	Year	Previous school	Home town
1	INF	Dylan Drake	L/R	5 ft 10 in (1.78 m)	185 lb (84 kg)	Jr	Sacramento City	Sacramento, California
2	INF	Charlie Vercruysse	R/R	6 ft 2 in (1.88 m)	185 lb (84 kg)	RS Fr	Notre Dame	Bloomington, Illinois
3	OF	Eli Anderson	L/R	6 ft 0 in (1.83 m)	175 lb (79 kg)	Sr	North Iowa Area	Fairmont, Minnesota
4	OF	Brandon Rogers	R/R	5 ft 11 in (1.8 m)	205 lb (93 kg)	Sr	Arizona	Chicago, Illinois
5	C	Jackson Bessette	R/R	6 ft 0 in (1.83 m)	200 lb (91 kg)	Sr	UIC	Bartlett, Illinois
6	INF	Westin Boyle	R/R	6 ft 3 in (1.91 m)	190 lb (86 kg)	Fr	Saint Thomas Aquinas H.S.	Overland Park, Kansas
7	INF	Kaden Frei	R/R	5 ft 9 in (1.75 m)	175 lb (79 kg)	Fr	Seton Hall Prep	West Orange, New Jersey
8	OF	Quincy Malbrough	R/R	6 ft 0 in (1.83 m)	200 lb (91 kg)	Jr	Folsom Lake	Loomis, California
9	UTL	Ali Banks	R/R	6 ft 1 in (1.85 m)	185 lb (84 kg)	Jr	Georgia Highlands	Stone Mountain, Georgia
10	INF	Sam Flores	L/R	6 ft 1 in (1.85 m)	220 lb (100 kg)	Sr	Kansas State	Lufkin, Texas
11	LHP	Lucas Grant	L/L	6 ft 1 in (1.85 m)	195 lb (88 kg)	Fr	Joliet Academy	Joliet, Illinois
13	UTL	Sergio DeCello	S/R	5 ft 10 in (1.78 m)	200 lb (91 kg)	RS Sr	Arizona Western	Hamilton, Ohio
14	UTL	Ross Highfill	R/R	6 ft 0 in (1.83 m)	205 lb (93 kg)	RS Jr	Mississippi State	Madison, Mississippi
15	INF	Zach Zychowski	R/R	5 ft 10 in (1.78 m)	185 lb (84 kg)	Jr	Southwestern Illinois	Cedar Lake, Indiana
16	LHP	Trevor Kester-Johnson	L/L	6 ft 0 in (1.83 m)	190 lb (86 kg)	RS Jr	Santa Barbara City	Morgan Hill, California
17	OF	Trey Swiderski	R/R	6 ft 3 in (1.91 m)	205 lb (93 kg)	Jr	John A. Logan	Joliet, Illinois
18	RHP	Joe Trenerry	R/R	6 ft 4 in (1.93 m)	225 lb (102 kg)	So	Penn H.S.	Granger, Indiana
19	OF	Avery Moore	R/R	6 ft 2 in (1.88 m)	230 lb (104 kg)	Sr	Southeast	Omaha, Nebraska
20	UTL	Aaron Manias	L/R	6 ft 2 in (1.88 m)	210 lb (95 kg)	RS Sr	Nebraska	Uxbridge, Ontario
21	INF	CJ Richmond	L/L	6 ft 3 in (1.91 m)	240 lb (109 kg)	Sr	Western Michigan	Indianapolis, Indiana
22	RHP	Jacob Boland	R/R	6 ft 4 in (1.93 m)	200 lb (91 kg)	So	Chipola	Fairfield, Ohio
23	LHP	Jarvis Evans	L/L	6 ft 4 in (1.93 m)	215 lb (98 kg)	Sr	South Carolina	Buford, Georgia
25	UTL	Jimmy Dionne	L/L	6 ft 4 in (1.93 m)	230 lb (104 kg)	Jr	Howard	Quebec City, Quebec
26	RHP	Cole Van Assen	R/R	6 ft 3 in (1.91 m)	205 lb (93 kg)	Jr	Brother Rice H.S.	Tinley Park, Illinois
27	RHP	Nick Kolze	R/R	6 ft 3 in (1.91 m)	205 lb (93 kg)	Sr	Heartland	Romeoville, Illinois
28	LHP	Tro Fellings	L/L	6 ft 4 in (1.93 m)	200 lb (91 kg)	Fr	Kalamazoo Central H.S.	Kalamazoo, Michigan
29	RHP	Gavin Beuter	R/R	6 ft 4 in (1.93 m)	210 lb (95 kg)	Sr	Kellogg	Three Rivers, Michigan
30	RHP	Graham Kollen	R/R	6 ft 3 in (1.91 m)	210 lb (95 kg)	Gr	Huntington	Fort Wayne, Indiana
31	LHP	Zach Erdman	L/L	6 ft 2 in (1.88 m)	185 lb (84 kg)	Sr	Texas Tech	Keller, Texas
33	RHP	Austin Klug	R/R	6 ft 4 in (1.93 m)	210 lb (95 kg)	Sr	North Iowa Area	Caledonia, Minnesota
34	RHP	Noah Filer	R/R	6 ft 4 in (1.93 m)	200 lb (91 kg)	Fr	Wayzata H.S.	Plymouth, Minnesota
35	UTL	Thomas Lynch	L/R	6 ft 1 in (1.85 m)	215 lb (98 kg)	RS Fr	Memorial H.S.	Evansville, Indiana
37	RHP	Jackson Greer	R/R	6 ft 1 in (1.85 m)	185 lb (84 kg)	RS So	Georgia Highlands	Cartersville, Georgia
38	RHP	Evan Schweizer	R/R	6 ft 5 in (1.96 m)	210 lb (95 kg)	RS Fr	Garth Webb H.S.	Oakville, Ontario
40	RHP	Barron Sawyer	R/R	6 ft 6 in (1.98 m)	235 lb (107 kg)	Sr	Northeast Texas	Abbeville, Louisiana
42	RHP	Thomas Howard	R/R	6 ft 4 in (1.93 m)	225 lb (102 kg)	RS So	John A. Logan	Lexington, Kentucky
55	RHP	Jake Kramer	R/R	6 ft 4 in (1.93 m)	230 lb (104 kg)	Sr	California (Pa.)	Greensburg, Pennsylvania

Head coach

Greg Goff

Assistant coach(es)

Barrett Serrato

Hitting coach(es)

Jimmy Brenneman

Pitching coach(es)

Josh Newman

Legend

- (C) Team captain
- (S) Suspended
- (I) Ineligible
- Injured
- Current redshirt

Roster
Last update: April 22, 2026

== Schedule ==
2026 Purdue Boilermakers baseball game log (37–20)
Regular season (35–18)
February (7–3)

#	Date	Rank	Opponent	Site Stadium	Score	Win	Loss	Save	Attendance	Overall Record	B1G Record
1	February 13		vs Portland*	Constellation Field • Sugar Land, Texas	3–9	Newmann (1–0)	**Kramer** (0–1)	None	340	0–1	–
2	February 14		vs Portland*	Constellation Field • Sugar Land, Texas	2–1	**Klug** (1–0)	Via (0–1)	None	290	1–1	–
–	February 14		vs Portland*	Constellation Field • Sugar Land, Texas	Game cancelled						
3	February 15		vs Portland*	Constellation Field • Sugar Land, Texas	10–7	**Howard** (1–0)	Louis (0–1)	**Greer** (1)	267	2–1	–
4	February 18		at Rice*	Reckling Park • Houston, Texas	2–5	Arnett (2–0)	**Klug** (1–1)	Thames (1)	1,315	2–2	–
5	February 20		vs No. 20 Southern Miss*	Dell Diamond • Round Rock, Texas	4–5	Clark (2–0)	**Kramer** (0–2)	None	–	2–3	–
6	February 21		vs Baylor*	Dell Diamond • Round Rock, Texas	6–5	**Kramer** (1–2)	Ruais (0–1)	None	4,391	3–3	–
7	February 22		vs No. 11 Oregon State*	Dell Diamond • Round Rock, Texas	5–2	**Evans** (0–1)	Segura (0–1)	**Kramer** (1)	–	4–3	–
8	February 27		vs Marist*	North Main Athletic Complex • Holly Springs, North Carolina	9–4	**Van Assen** (1–0)	Taylor (0–2)	**Trenerry** (1)	244	5–3	–
9	February 28		vs Marist*	North Main Athletic Complex • Holly Springs, North Carolina	11–10	**Kramer** (2–2)	Scholl (0–1)	None	–	6–3	–
10	February 28		vs Marist*	North Main Athletic Complex • Holly Springs, North Carolina	8–2	**Klug** (2–1)	Ubner (0–1)	**Filer** (1)	688	7–3	–

March (12–6)

#	Date	Rank	Opponent	Site Stadium	Score	Win	Loss	Save	Attendance	Overall Record	B1G Record
11	March 1		vs Marist*	North Main Athletic Complex • Holly Springs, North Carolina	18–1^{7}	**Evans** (2–0)	Mazza (0–3)	None	664	8–3	–
12	March 6		No. 23 Oregon	Alexander Field • West Lafayette, Indiana	7–8	Sanford (3–0)	**Van Assen** (1–1)	Featherston (1)	1,927	8–4	0–1
13	March 7		Oregon	Alexander Field • West Lafayette, Indiana	2–1	**Erdman** (1–0)	Clarke (2–1)	**Kramer** (2)	1,370	9–4	1–1
14	March 8		Oregon	Alexander Field • West Lafayette, Indiana	4–15^{8}	Scolari (3–0)	**Evans** (2–1)	None	1,569	9–5	1–2
15	March 10		Milwaukee*	Alexander Field • West Lafayette, Indiana	17–1	**Klug** (3–1)	Arnold (0–2)	None	–	10–5	1–2
16	March 13		at Maryland	Bob "Turtle" Smith Stadium • College Park, Maryland	16–5	**Howard** (2–0)	Hastings (1–1)	None	647	11–5	2–2
17	March 14		at Maryland	Bob "Turtle" Smith Stadium • College Park, Maryland	8–6	**Erdman** (2–0)	Smith (0–1)	**Kramer** (3)	969	12–5	3–2
18	March 15		at Maryland	Bob "Turtle" Smith Stadium • College Park, Maryland	9–10	Hastings (2–1)	**Kramer** (2–3)	None	713	12–6	3–3
–	March 17		at Butler*	Bulldog Park • Indianapolis, Indiana	Game cancelled						
19	March 18		Oakland City*	Alexander Field • West Lafayette, Indiana	11–3	**Klug** (4–1)	Rheinhardt (0–1)	None	224	13–6	3–3
20	March 20		Penn State	Alexander Field • West Lafayette, Indiana	12–7	**Van Assen** (2–1)	Fitzgerald (2–4)	None	1,154	14–6	4–3
21	March 21		Penn State	Alexander Field • West Lafayette, Indiana	2–1	**Erdman** (3–0)	Emmons (0–1)	**Kramer** (4)	1,490	15–6	5–3
22	March 22		Penn State	Alexander Field • West Lafayette, Indiana	9–14	Shayter (1–3)	**Evans** (2–2)	None	1,269	15–7	5–4
23	March 24		Valparaiso*	Alexander Field • West Lafayette, Indiana	3–2	**Kramer** (3–3)	Kafka (0–1)	None	1,243	16–7	5–4
24	March 25		UIC*	Alexander Field • West Lafayette, Indiana	18–13	**Beuter** (1–0)	Barrera (0–1)	**Howard** (1)	1,403	17–7	5–4
25	March 27		at Michigan State	McLane Stadium • East Lansing, Michigan	3–4	Higgins (2–1)	**Van Assen** (2–2)	None	641	17–8	5–5
26	March 28		at Michigan State	McLane Stadium • East Lansing, Michigan	16–13	**Boland** (1–0)	Grundman (0–3)	**Kramer** (5)	813	18–8	6–5
27	March 29		at Michigan State	McLane Stadium • East Lansing, Michigan	11–4	**Howard** (3–0)	Chambers (2–1)	None	595	19–8	7–5
28	March 31		at Indiana State*	Bob Warn Field • Terre Haute, Indiana	4–12	Seeman (2–0)	**Evans** (2–3)	None	1,351	19–9	7–5

April (10–6)

#	Date	Rank	Opponent	Site Stadium	Score	Win	Loss	Save	Attendance	Overall Record	B1G Record
29	April 3		Illinois	Alexander Field • West Lafayette, Indiana	6–1	**Van Assen** (3–2)	Hall (4–3)	None	1,165	20–9	8–5
30	April 4		Illinois	Alexander Field • West Lafayette, Indiana	5–7	Remington (3–2)	**Boland** (1–1)	Gannon (1)	1,230	20–10	8–6
31	April 5		Illinois	Alexander Field • West Lafayette, Indiana	10–5	**Howard** (4–0)	Mommer (1–1)	None	1,141	21–10	9–6
32	April 7		Bradley*	Alexander Field • West Lafayette, Indiana	13–6	**Trenerry** (1–0)	Horras (0–2)	None	1,020	22–10	9–6
33	April 10		at Northwestern	Rocky Miller Park • Evanston, Illinois	11–3	**Van Assen** (4–2)	Rifenburg (2–3)	**Howard** (2)	203	23–10	10–6
34	April 11		at Northwestern	Rocky Miller Park • Evanston, Illinois	3–2^{10}	**Kramer** (4–3)	Dickson (0–1)	None	301	24–10	11–6
35	April 12		at Northwestern	Rocky Miller Park • Evanston, Illinois	8–3	**Klug** (5–1)	Whitaker (2–2)	None	351	25–10	12–6
36	April 14		Miami (OH)*	Alexander Field • West Lafayette, Indiana	3–5^{11}	Iozzo (1–0)	**Trenerry** (1–1)	None	2,263	25–11	12–6
37	April 17		Ohio State	Alexander Field • West Lafayette, Indiana	10–9	**Van Assen** (5–2)	Kuzniewski (2–2)	**Kramer** (6)	2,329	26–11	13–6
38	April 18		Ohio State	Alexander Field • West Lafayette, Indiana	12–7	**Beuter** (2–0)	Domke (4–4)	None	2,021	27–11	14–6
39	April 19		Ohio State	Alexander Field • West Lafayette, Indiana	6–2	**Klug** (6–1)	Herrenbruck (4–2)	None	1,505	28–11	15–6
40	April 21		Indiana State*	Alexander Field • West Lafayette, Indiana	5–6	Seeman (5–0)	**Kester-Johnson** (0–1)	Armstrong (1)	2,312	28–12	15–6
41	April 24		at No. 21 USC	Dedeaux Field • Los Angeles, California	3–4	Velazquez (4–1)	**Van Assen** (5–3)	Troy (11)	908	28–13	15–7
42	April 25		at No. 21 USC	Dedeaux Field • Los Angeles, California	1–6	Govel (8–1)	**Erdman** (3–1)	None	811	28–14	15–8
43	April 26		at No. 21 USC	Dedeaux Field • Los Angeles, California	4–11	Johnson (4–2)	**Klug** (6–2)	None	1,291	28–15	15–9
44	April 29		Southern Indiana*	Alexander Field • West Lafayette, Indiana	5–1	**Beuter** (3–0)	Bell (0–1)	None	1,565	29–15	15–9

May (6–3)

#	Date	Rank	Opponent	Site Stadium	Score	Win	Loss	Save	Attendance	Overall Record	B1G Record
45	May 1		Murray State*	Alexander Field • West Lafayette, Indiana	7–5	**Van Assen** (6–3)	Schutte (7–4)	**Kramer** (7)	1,357	30–15	15–9
46	May 2		Murray State*	Alexander Field • West Lafayette, Indiana	11–4	**Erdman** (4–1)	Hustedde (2–4)	None	1,504	31–15	15–9
47	May 3		Murray State*	Alexander Field • West Lafayette, Indiana	17–8	**Howard** (5–0)	Deremer (3–1)	None	1,438	32–15	15–9
48	May 5		Ball State*	Alexander Field • West Lafayette, Indiana	**Canceled**						
49	May 8		Indiana	Alexander Field • West Lafayette, Indiana	11–9	**Kollen** (1–0)	Seebold (2–4)	**Kramer** (8)	1,915	33–15	16–9
50	May 9		Indiana	Alexander Field • West Lafayette, Indiana	5–4	**Beuter** (4–0)	Gubitosi (2–1)	None	2,012	34–15	17–9
51	May 10		Indiana	Alexander Field • West Lafayette, Indiana	11–8	**Evans** (3–3)	Jacobi (1–2)	**Kramer** (9)	1,800	35–15	18–9
52	May 12		at Ball State*	Shebek Stadium • Muncie, Indiana	**Canceled**						
53	May 14		at Iowa	Principal Park • Des Moines, Iowa	7–10	Hackett (1–1)	**Van Assen** (6–4)	Alivo (1)	2,293	35–16	18–10
54	May 15		at Iowa	Principal Park • Des Moines, Iowa	5–14	Bleeker (6–5)	**Kollen** (1–1)	None	4,036	35–17	18–11
55	May 16		at Iowa	Principal Park • Des Moines, Iowa	9–15	Frost (1–0)	**Klug** (6–3)	None	3,706	35–18	18–12

Postseason (2–2)
Big Ten Tournament (2–2)

#	Date	Rank	Opponent	Venue	Score	Win	Loss	Save	Attendance	Overall record	Tournament record
	May 19	(5)	vs. (12) Michigan State	Charles Schwab Field • Omaha, Nebraska	8–4	Donovan (6–3)	**Van Assen** (6–5)	None		35–19	0–1
	May 20	(5)	vs. (9) Illinois	Charles Schwab Field ▪︎ Omaha, Nebraska	3–1	**Howard** (6–0)	Flinn (1–3)	**Kramer** (10)		36–19	1–1
	May 21	(5)	vs. (8) Iowa	Charles Schwab Field ▪︎ Omaha, Nebraska	8–1	**Evans** (4–3)	Frost (1–1)	None		37–19	2–1
	May 22	(5)	vs. (1) No. 1 UCLA	Charles Schwab Field ▪︎ Omaha, Nebraska	3–4	Hawk (4–2)	**Kramer** (4–4)	None		37–20	2–2

"#" represents ranking. All rankings from D1 Baseball Poll on the date of the contest.
"()" represents postseason seeding in the Big 10 Tournament or NCAA Regional, respectively.
= Win, = Loss, = Canceled/Postponed
Bold = **Purdue Boilermakers team member**
* = Non-Conference Game
Schedule Source:

== Rankings ==
Ranking movements Legend: ██ Increase in ranking ██ Decrease in ranking — = Not ranked RV = Received votes
	Week																
Poll	Pre	1	2	3	4	5	6	7	8	9	10	11	12	13	14	15	Final
Coaches'	—	—*	—	—	—	—	—	—	—	—	RV	—	—	—	—	RV	
Baseball America	—	—	—	—	—	—	—	—	—	—	—	—	—	—	—	—*	
NCBWA†	—	—	—	—	—	RV	RV	RV	RV	RV	RV	RV	RV	RV	RV	RV*	
D1Baseball	—	—	—	—	—	—	—	—	—	—	—	—	—	—	—	—	
Perfect Game	—	—	—	—	—	—	—	—	—	—	—	—	—	—	—	—*	

† NCBWA ranks 30 teams in their preseason poll, but only ranks 25 teams weekly during the season.
* A new poll was not released for this week, so for comparison purposes, the previous week's ranking is inserted in this week's slot.
