= 2026 Oregon Ducks baseball team =

American college baseball season

2026 Oregon Ducks baseball

NCAA Eugene Regional Champions

NCAA Austin Super Regional, 0–2
- Conference: Big Ten Conference

Ranking
- Coaches: No. 14
- D1Baseball.com: No. 13
- Record: 43–18 (20–10 Big Ten)
- Head coach: Mark Wasikowski (7th season)
- Assistant coach: Brett Thomas (1st season)
- Hitting coach: Jack Marder (7th season)
- Pitching coach: Matt Florer (1st season)
- Home stadium: PK Park

2026 Big Ten Conference baseball standings
	Conf.						Overall
Team	W		L		T	PCT	W		L		T	PCT
No. 11 UCLA ‍†‍‡‍^{y}	28	–	2	–	0	.933	48	–	6	–	0	.889
Nebraska ‍‍‍^{y}	23	–	7	–	0	.767	41	–	14	–	0	.745
No. 13 Oregon ‍‍‍^{y}	20	–	10	–	0	.667	38	–	15	–	0	.717
No. 15 USC ‍‍‍^{y}	20	–	10	–	0	.667	42	–	14	–	0	.750
Purdue ‍‍‍	18	–	13	–	0	.581	36	–	18	–	0	.667
Ohio State ‍‍‍	18	–	12	–	0	.600	29	–	24	–	0	.547
Michigan ‍‍‍	17	–	13	–	0	.567	33	–	22	–	0	.600
Iowa ‍‍‍	15	–	15	–	0	.500	30	–	21	–	0	.588
Illinois ‍‍‍	14	–	16	–	0	.467	27	–	27	–	0	.500
Rutgers ‍‍‍	13	–	17	–	0	.433	26	–	29	–	0	.473
Washington ‍‍‍	12	–	18	–	0	.400	23	–	31	–	0	.426
Michigan State ‍‍‍	12	–	19	–	0	.387	22	–	31	–	0	.415
Minnesota ‍‍‍	11	–	19	–	0	.367	30	–	23	–	0	.566
Maryland ‍‍‍	9	–	21	–	0	.300	27	–	29	–	0	.482
Indiana ‍‍‍	9	–	21	–	0	.300	23	–	31	–	0	.426
Penn State ‍‍‍	9	–	21	–	0	.300	16	–	35	–	0	.314
Northwestern ‍‍‍	8	–	22	–	0	.267	21	–	30	–	1	.413
† – Conference champion ‡ – Tournament champion y – Invited to the NCAA tournament As of May 19, 2026; Rankings from D1Baseball

The 2026 Oregon Ducks baseball team represented the University of Oregon in the 2026 NCAA Division I baseball season. The Ducks played their home games at PK Park in Eugene, Oregon and were members of the Big Ten Conference in their second season, after spending the last 59 years in the Pac-12 Conference. The team was coached by Mark Wasikowski in his 7th season at Oregon.

== Previous season ==
The Ducks ended the 2025 season with a record of 22–8 in conference play and 42–16 overall record, resulting in being the Big Ten Conference regular season co-champions with UCLA. They would play in the Big Ten tournament as the #1 Seed on Pool A in Game 1 they would win again Michigan State and then in Game 2 would lose against the #8 seed Nebraska, causing them to be eliminated from the tournament. They would be invited to play in the 2025 NCAA Division I baseball tournament, where they were given the national overall seed of 12, allowing to host the Eugene Regional. There they would have a disappointing NCAA tournament campaign, going 0–2 losing to #4 Seed Utah Valley in the opening game, before being eliminated by #3 Seed Cal Poly in the elimination game.

At the conclusion of the season, head coach, Mark Wasikowski, was named the Big Ten Conference Baseball Coach of the Year. Five Oregon players were named to the All-Big Ten first-team: Ryan Cooney, Grayson Grinsell, Seth Mattox, Mason Neville, and Jacob Walsh. Four Oregon players were named to the All-Big Ten third-team: Anson Aroz, Maddox Maloney, Dominic Hellman, and Jason Reitz. Finally, Burke-Lee Mabeus was named to the All-Freshman team.

== Preseason ==
=== Coaches poll ===
The coaches poll was released on February 11, 2026. Only the top six teams are publicly revealed. Oregon was selected to finish second in the conference.

Coaches' Poll
Predicted finish	Team
1	UCLA
2	Oregon
3	USC
4	Nebraska
5	Indiana
6	Iowa

== Game log ==
2026 Oregon Ducks baseball game log (43–18)
Regular season (38–15)

February (9–1)
Date	Time (PT)	TV	Opponent	Rank	Stadium	Score	Win	Loss	Save	Attendance	Overall	B1G	Sources
February 13	3:05 p.m.	B1G+	George Mason*	No. 23	PK Park; Eugene, OR	**W** 6–2	**Sanford** (1–0)	Stewart (0–1)	—	2,241	1–0	—	Report
February 14	11:05 a.m.	B1G+	George Mason*	No. 23	PK Park	**W** 14–5	**Clarke** (1–0)	Cardenas (0–1)	—	1,917	2–0	—	Report
February 14	3:05 p.m.	B1G+	George Mason*	No. 23	PK Park	**W** 14–4	**Scolari** (1–0)	Rumberg (0–1)	—	1,917	3–0	—	Report
February 15	12:05 p.m.	B1G+	George Mason*	No. 23	PK Park	**W** 11–1	**Featherson** (1–0)	Wrehe (0–1)	—	2,067	4–0	—	Report
February 19	2:05 p.m.	B1G+	Youngstown State*	No. 23	PK Park	**W** 18–1	**Twist** (1–0)	English (0–2)	—	1,591	5–0	—	Report
February 20	2:05 p.m.	B1G+	Youngstown State*	No. 23	PK Park	**W** 3–0	**Sanford** (1–0)	Gebhardt (0–1)	**Bell** (1)	1,734	6–0	—	Report
February 21	12:05 p.m.	B1G+	Youngstown State*	No. 23	PK Park	**W** 7–0	**Clarke** (2–0)	Messmore (0–1)	—	1,846	7–0	—	Report
February 22	12:05 p.m.	B1G+	Youngstown State*	No. 23	PK Park	**W** 15–6	**Featherston** (2–0)	Mikos (0–2)	—	1,655	8–0	—	Report
Live Like Lou Las Vegas College Baseball Classic
February 27	6:00 p.m.	D1B	vs. Arizona*	No. 24	Las Vegas Ballpark; Las Vegas, NV	**W** 7–2	**Bradley** (1–0)	Kramkowski (0–2)	—	4,722	9–0	—	Report
February 28	12:00 p.m.	D1B	vs. UC Irvine*	No. 24	Las Vegas Ballpark	**L** 6–8	Grack (1–0)	**Bell** (0–1)	**Manning** (1)	5,713	9–1	—	Report

March (14–5)
Date	Time (PT)	TV	Opponent	Rank	Stadium	Score	Win	Loss	Save	Attendance	Overall	B1G	Sources
Live Like Lou Las Vegas College Baseball Classic
March 1	11:00 a.m.	D1B	vs. No. 22 Vanderbilt*	No. 24	Las Vegas Ballpark	**W** 6–4	**Scolari** (2–0)	Taylor (0–2)	**Bell** (2)	5,304	10–1	—	Report
Civil War Series
March 3	3:05 p.m.	BTN	No. 18 Oregon State*	No. 23	PK Park	**L** 6–10	Scott (2–0)	**Gosztola** (0–1)	—	3,634	10–2	—	Report
March 6	1:00 p.m.	B1G+	at Purdue	No. 23	Alexander Field; West Lafayette, IN	**W** 8–7	**Sanford** (3–0)	Van Assen (1–1)	**Featherson** (1)	1,927	11–2	1–0	Report
March 7	11:00 a.m.	B1G+	at Purdue	No. 23	Alexander Field	**L** 1–2	Erdman (1–0)	**Clarke** (2–1)	Kramer (2)	1,370	11–3	1–1	Report
March 8	9:00 a.m.	B1G+	at Purdue	No. 23	Alexander Field	**W** 15–4^{(8)}	**Scolari** (3–0)	Evans (2–1)	—	1,569	12–3	2–1	Report
March 10	3:05 p.m.	B1G+	Xavier*		PK Park	**W** 10–0^{(8)}	**Twist** (2–0)	Young (0–1)	—	1,770	13–3	—	Report
March 11	3:05 p.m.	B1G+	Xavier*		PK Park	**W** 6–3	**Featherson** (3–0)	Poole (0–2)	**Bell** (3)	1,718	14–3	—	Report
March 13	4:05 p.m.	B1G+	Indiana		PK Park	**W** 3–2	**Bradley** (2–0)	Seebold (1–1)	**Bell** (4)	2,155	15–3	3–1	Report
March 14	2:05 p.m.	B1G+	Indiana		PK Park	**W** 5–1	**Clarke** (3–1)	Neubeck (1–2)	—	2,379	16–3	4–1	Report
March 15	12:35 p.m.	BTN	Indiana		PK Park	**W** 7–6	**Bell** (1–1)	Yarberry (0–2)	—	2,146	17–3	5–1	Report
March 20	3:05 p.m.	B1G+	Northwestern	No. 19	PK Park	**W** 20–6^{(7)}	**Sanford** (4–0)	Weaver (0–3)	—	2,212	18–3	6–1	Report
March 21	3:05 p.m.	B1G+	Northwestern	No. 19	PK Park	**W** 6–4	**Clarke** (4–1)	Shearer (0–1)	**Bell** (5)	2,468	19–3	7–1	Report
March 22	3:05 p.m.	B1G+	Northwestern	No. 19	PK Park	**L** 10–11^{(12)}	**Fryer** (2–1)	Bell (1–2)	—	2,228	19–4	7–2	Report
March 24	6:00 p.m.	ESPN+	at UC San Diego*	No. 17	Triton Ballpark; La Jolla, CA	**W** 6–0	**Gosztola** (1–1)	Villar (0–2)	—	859	20–4	—	Report
March 25	3:00 p.m.	ESPN+	at UC San Diego*	No. 17	Triton Ballpark	**W** 12–4	**Meckna** (1–0)	Rector (0–1)	—	314	21–4	—	Report
March 27	4:35 p.m.	ESPN+	at UCSB*	No. 17	Caesar Uyesaka Stadium; Goleta, CA	**W** 4–0	**Morgan** (1–0)	Raymond (1–1)	—	854	22–4	—	Report
March 28	3:05 p.m.	ESPN+	at UCSB*	No. 17	Caesar Uyesaka Stadium	**L** 2–8	Tryba (1–2)	**Clarke** (4–2)	—	631	22–5	—	Report
March 29	12:05 p.m.	EPSN+	at UCSB*	No. 17	Caesar Uyesaka Stadium; Goleta, CA	**W** 2–0	**Scolari** (4–0)	Montgomery (4–2)	**Bell** (6)	812	23–5	—	Report
March 31	5:05 p.m.	B1G+	Portland*	No. 10	PK Park	**L** 0–3	Louis (2–1)	**Gosztola** (1–2)	Via (6)	2,063	23–6	—	Report

April (10–5)
Date	Time (PT)	TV	Opponent	Rank	Stadium	Score	Win	Loss	Save	Attendance	Overall	B1G	Sources
April 2	12:00 p.m.	B1G+	at Michigan	No. 10	Ray Fisher Stadium; Ann Arbor, MI	**L** 0–10^{(7)}	Brinham (2–3)	**Sanford** (4–1)	—	639	23–7	7–3	Report
April 3	1:00 p.m.	B1G+	at Michigan	No. 10	Ray Fisher Stadium	**W** 5–2	**Clarke** (5–2)	Devooght (0–3)	**Bell** (7)	1,564	24–7	8–3	Report
April 4	8:00 a.m.	B1G+	at Michigan	No. 10	Ray Fisher Stadium	**L** 3–4	Montgomery (3–1)	**Bell** (1–3)	—	1,156	24–8	8–4	Report
April 8	3:30 p.m.	B1G+	at Portland*	No. 20	Joe Etzel Field; Portland, OR	**L** 9–13	Segel (2–1)	**Morgan** (1–1)	—	1,000	24–9	—	Report
April 10	3:05 p.m.	B1G+	No. 19 Nebraska	No. 20	PK Park	**W** 7–6	**Sanford** (5–1)	Timmerman (2–1)	**Bell** (8)	2,640	25–9	9–4	Report
April 11	12:05 p.m.	B1G+	No. 19 Nebraska	No. 20	PK Park	**L** 8–10	Clark (2–2)	**Clarke** (5–3)	Unger (7)	2,410	25–10	9–5	Report
April 12	12:05 p.m.	B1G+	No. 19 Nebraska	No. 20	PK Park	**W** 5–4	**Bradley** (3–0)	Cleavinger (0–1)	**Bell** (9)	2,701	19–4	10–5	Report
Civil War Series
April 14	6:00 p.m.	KOIN	vs. No. 6 Oregon State*	No. 17	Hillsboro Ballpark; Hillsboro, OR	**Cancelled**							
April 17	1:30 p.m.	B1G+	at Illinois	No. 17	Illinois Field; Champaign, IL	**W** 16–6^{(7)}	**Sanford** (6–1)	Hall (5–4)	—	712	27–10	11–5	Report
April 18	3:00 p.m.	B1G+	at Illinois	No. 17	Illinois Field	**L** 13–16	Mommer (2–1)	**Bell** (1–4)	—	1,216	27–11	11–6	Report
April 19	11:00 a.m.	B1G+	at Illinois	No. 17	Illinois Field	**W** 11–5	**Uelmen** (1–0)	Reed (1–1)	—	1,261	28–11	12–6	Report
Civil War Series
April 22	5:35 p.m.	KOIN	at No. 6 Oregon State*	No. 16	Goss Stadium at Coleman Field; Corvallis, OR	**W** 7–3	**Twist** (3–0)	Queen (1–1)	—	3,981	29–11	—	Report
April 24	6:05 p.m.	B1G+	Penn State	No. 16	PK Park	**W** 5–4	**Bradley** (4–0)	Emmons (1–2)	—	2,735	30–11	13–6	Report
April 25	4:05 p.m.	B1G+	Penn State	No. 16	PK Park	**W** 5–4^{(10)}	**Bel** (2–4)	Demell (1–1)	—	3,946	31–11	14–6	Report
April 26	12:05 p.m.	B1G+	Penn State	No. 16	PK Park	**W** 5–0	**Gosztola** (2–2)	Shayter (1–7)	—	3,044	32–11	15–6	Report
April 28	2:05 p.m.	B1G+	Gonzaga*	No. 13	PK Park	**W** 4–3	**Johnson** (1–0)	Bowman (2–5)	**Bell** (10)	1,966	33–11	—	Report

May (5–4)
Date	Time (PT)	TV	Opponent	Rank	Stadium	Score	Win	Loss	Save	Attendance	Overall	B1G	Source
Cascade Clash
May 1	7:05 p.m.	B1G+	at Washington	No. 13	Husky Ballpark; Seattle, WA	**W** 6–4	**Howard** (1–0)	Brandenburg (2–2)	**Bradley** (1)	2,436	34–11	16–6	Report
May 2	7:05 p.m.	BTN	at Washington	No. 13	Husky Ballpark	**W** 10–4	**Uelmen** (2–0)	Kenney (4–5)	None	1,956	35–11	17–6	
May 3	1:05 p.m.	B1G+	at Washington	No. 13	Husky Ballpark	**L** 5–9	Lewis (6–4)	**Gosztola** (2–3)	None	1,944	35–12	17–7	
May 5	4:00 p.m.	B1G+	Grand Canyon*	No. 13	PK Park	**Canceled**							
May 6	4:00 p.m.	B1G+	Grand Canyon*	No. 13	PK Park	**Canceled**							
May 8	7:02 p.m.	BTN	at No. 1 UCLA	No. 13	Jackie Robinson Stadium; Los Angeles, CA	**L** 1–11^{(7)}	Moss (5–0)	**Samford** (6–2)	None	1,545	35–13	17–8	
May 9	6:32 p.m.	BTN	at No. 1 UCLA	No. 13	Jackie Robinson Stadium	**W** 9–6	**Bradley** (5–0)	Hawk (3–2)	None	1,362	36–13	18–8	
May 10	12:02 p.m.	B1G+	at No. 1 UCLA	No. 13	Jackie Robinson Stadium	**L** 6–9	Strickland (6–1)	**Bell** (2–5)	Hawk (13)	1,290	36–14	18–9	
May 14	7:05 p.m.	B1G+	No. 17 USC	No. 16	PK Park	**L** 1–2^{(11)}	Johnson (6–2)	**Bradley** (5–1)	Troy (12)	3,644	36–15	18–10	
May 15	6:05 p.m.	B1G+	No. 17 USC	No. 16	PK Park	**W** 4–3	**Sanford** (7–2)	Govel (10–2)	**Bell** (11)	3,461	37–15	19–10	
May 16	3:02 p.m.	BTN	No. 17 USC	No. 16	PK Park	**W** 6–5^{(14)}	**Clarke** (6–3)	Matson (1–2)	None	3,846	38–15	20–10	

Postseason (5–3)

Big 10 tournament (2–1)
Date	Time (CT)	TV	Opponent	Rank	Stadium	Score	Win	Loss	Save	Attendance	Overall	B1GT Record	Sources
May 23	10:00 a.m.	BTN	vs. (11) Washington	(3); No. 14	Charles Schwab Field Omaha; Omaha, NE	**W** 9–4	**Scolari** (5–0)	Kenney (4–7)	None	12,083	39–15	1–0	
May 23	7:00 p.m.	BTN	vs. (2) No. 20 Nebraska	(3); No. 14	Charles Schwab Field Omaha	**W** 8–0	**Sanford** (8–2)	Blachowicz (4–3)	None	12,083	40–15	2–0	
May 24	2:00 p.m.	BTN	vs. (1) UCLA	(3); No. 14	Charles Schwab Field Omaha	**L** 2–3^{(11)}	Hawk (6–2)	**Bell** (2–6)	None		40–16	2–1	

NCAA Eugene Regional (3–0)
Date	Time (PT)	TV	Opponent	Rank	Stadium	Score	Win	Loss	Save	Attendance	Overall	NCAAT Record	Sources
May 29	5:00 p.m.	ESPN+	(4) Yale*	(1) No. 15	PK Park	**W** 14–2	**Twist** (4–0)	Ohman (5–3)	None	4,278	41–16	1–0	Report
May 30	6:00 p.m.	ESPN+	(3) Washington State*	(1) No. 15	PK Park	**W** 4–0	**Sanford** (9–2)	Meyers (4–5)	None	4,278	42–16	2–0	Report
May 31	6:00 p.m.	ESPN2	(2) No. 8 Oregon State*	(1) No. 15	PK Park	**W** 4–1	**Gosztola** (3–3)	Yeager (6–2)	**Bell** (12)	4,278	43–16	3–0	Report

NCAA Austin Super Regional (0–2)
Date	Time (PT)	TV	Opponent	Rank	Stadium	Score	Win	Loss	Save	Attendance	Overall	NCAAT Record	Sources
June 6	5:00 p.m.	ESPN	(6) No. 6 Texas*	(11) No. 15	UFCU Disch–Falk Field; Austin, TX	**L** 3–11	Volantis (10–1)	**Scolari** (5–1)	None	8,550	43–17	0–1	Report
June 7	6:00 p.m.	ESPN	(6) No. 6 Texas*	(11) No. 15	UFCU Disch–Falk Field	**L** 5–6	Burns (2–0)	**Bell** (2–7)	Cozart (9)	8,465	43–18	0–2	Report

Legend: = Win = Loss = Canceled
Bold = Oregon team member
Rankings are based on the team's current ranking in the D1Baseball poll.

== Rankings ==
Ranking movements Legend: ██ Increase in ranking ██ Decrease in ranking — = Not ranked RV = Received votes т = Tied with team above or below
	Week																	
Poll	Pre	1	2	3	4	5	6	7	8	9	10	11	12	13	14	15	16	Final
Coaches'	23	23*	24	23	RV	19	17	10	20	19	21	14т	14	15	12	12	12*	14
Baseball America	—	—	—	—	—	25	19	17	—	—	—	—	23	23	18	18*	18*	12
NCBWA†	RV	RV	RV	25	RV	22	18	14	22	20	18	14	15	15	12	12*	6	11
D1Baseball	—	—	—	—	—	21	20	15	21	19	19	13	13	16	14	15	15*	13
Perfect Game	13	13	9	10	14	13	13	10	20	17	16	11	8	11	11	11*	11*	10

† NCBWA ranks 30 teams in their preseason poll, but only ranks 25 teams weekly during the season.
* A new poll was not released for this week, so for comparison purposes, the previous week's ranking is inserted in this week's slot.
