= Will Bolt =

American baseball coach and former shortstop

Current position
- Title: Head coach
- Team: Nebraska
- Conference: Big Ten
- Record: 213–143–1

Biographical details
- Born: 1979 (age 46–47); Conroe, Texas, U.S.

Playing career
- 1999–2002: Nebraska
- Position: Second Baseman

Coaching career (HC unless noted)
- 2005: Nebraska (asst.)
- 2006–2007: Texas A&M (asst.)
- 2008–2011: Texarkana College
- 2012–2014: Nebraska (asst.)
- 2015–2019: Texas A&M (asst.)
- 2020–present: Nebraska

Head coaching record
- Overall: 213–143–1 (NCAA); 140–82 (NJCAA)
- Tournaments: Big Ten: 12–4; NCAA: 6–6

Accomplishments and honors

Championships
- 2 Big Ten tournament (2024, 2025); Big Ten (2021)

Awards
- Big Ten Coach of the Year (2021)

Will Bolt (born 1979) is an American baseball coach and former shortstop, who is the current head baseball coach at the Nebraska Cornhuskers. He played college baseball at Nebraska for coach Dave Van Horn from 1999 to 2002. He then served as the head coach of the Texarkana Bulldogs (2008–2011).

== Playing career ==
Bolt attended Conroe High School in Conroe, Texas. He then enrolled at the University of Nebraska–Lincoln, to play college baseball for the Cornhuskers.

=== Career statistics ===
Year	Team	G	PA	AB	R	H	2B	3B	HR	RBI	SB	CS	BB	K	BA	OBP	SLG	OPS
1999	Nebraska	59	254	224	48	63	16	7	4	43	8	3	18	27	.278	.331	.463	.794
2000	Nebraska	65	278	246	57	86	12	0	3	41	18	7	26	25	.350	.421	.435	.856
2001	Nebraska	61	258	211	46	56	10	3	2	30	7	0	38	35	.265	.384	.370	.754
2002	Nebraska	66	272	238	46	76	18	3	2	29	8	1	27	38	.319	.397	.445	.842
Career		251	1062	922	197	281	56	13	11	143	41	11	109	125	.305	.384	.430	.814

== Coaching career ==
Bolt began his college coaching career as a volunteer assistant for Nebraska in 2005, helping guide the team to the 2005 College World Series. He served as a volunteer assistant for Texas A&M during the 2006 and 2007 seasons. Bolt then was hired as the head coach of Texarkana College.

In 2012, Bolt joined Darin Erstad's staff at Nebraska. In the fall of 2014, Bolt joined Rob Childress' staff at Texas A&M. Childress was an assistant at Nebraska during Bolt's playing career.

On June 14, 2019, Bolt was named the head coach of the Cornhuskers.

On May 30, 2021, Bolt was named Big Ten Coach of the Year.

== Head coaching record ==
Record table
Season	Team	Overall	Conference	Standing	Postseason
Texarkana Bulldogs (Southwest Junior College Conference) (2008–2011)
2008	Texarkana	33–23			Region XIV Tournament
2009	Texarkana	40–15		1st	Region XIV Final
2010	Texarkana	36–21	20–8	1st	Region XIV Tournament
2011	Texarkana	31–23		2nd	Region XIV Tournament
Texarkana:		140–82 (NJCAA)			
Nebraska Cornhuskers (Big Ten Conference) (2020–present)
2020	Nebraska	7–8	0–0		Season canceled due to COVID-19
2021	Nebraska	34–14	31–12	1st	NCAA Regional
2022	Nebraska	23–30	10–14	T–8th	
2023	Nebraska	33–23–1	15–9	4th	Big Ten tournament
2024	Nebraska	40–22	16–8	2nd	NCAA Regional
2025	Nebraska	33–29	15–15	8th	NCAA Regional
2026	Nebraska	43–17	22–7	2nd	NCAA Regional
Nebraska:		213–143–1 (.598)	110–65 (.629)		
Total:		353–225–1 (.611)			
National champion Postseason invitational champion Conference regular season champion Conference regular season and conference tournament champion Division regular season champion Division regular season and conference tournament champion Conference tournament champion

== See also ==
- List of current NCAA Division I baseball coaches
