= Walt Tragesser =

American baseball player

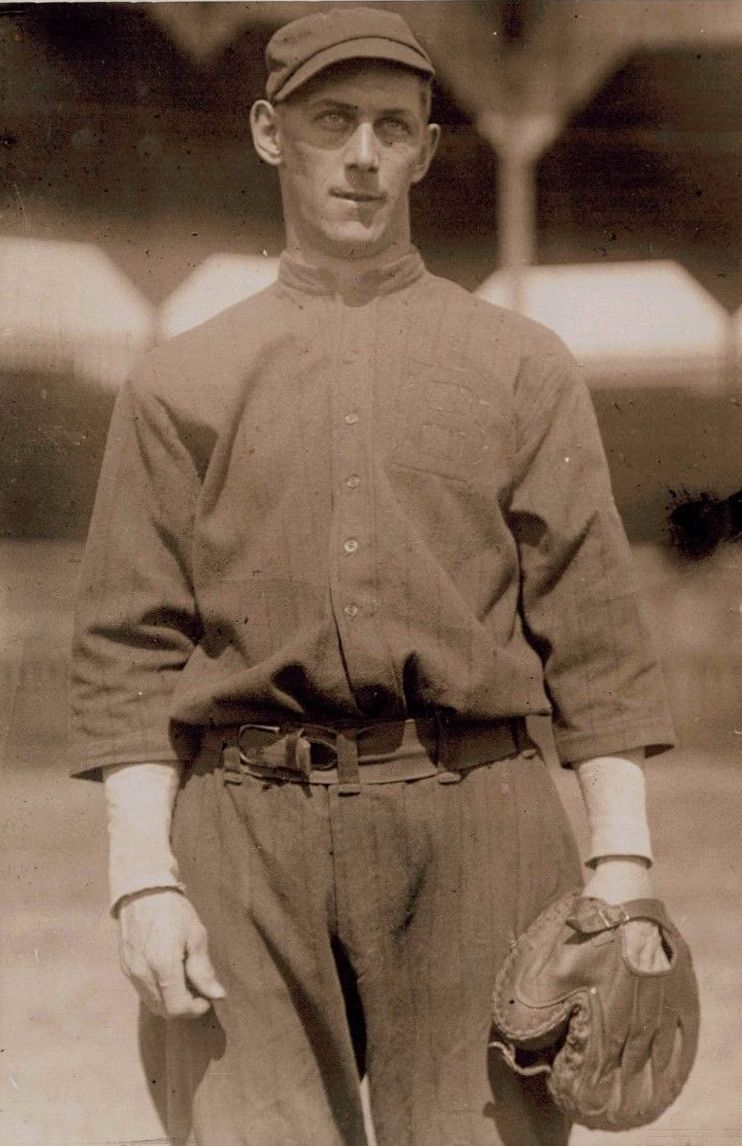
- Catcher
- Born: June 14, 1887; Lafayette, Indiana, U.S.
- Died: December 14, 1970 (aged 83); Lafayette, Indiana, U.S.
- Batted: Right Threw: Right

MLB debut
- July 30, 1913, for the Boston Braves

Last MLB appearance
- October 2, 1920, for the Philadelphia Phillies

MLB statistics
- Batting average: .215
- Home runs: 6
- Runs batted in: 66
- Stats at Baseball Reference

Teams
- Boston Braves (1913, 1915–1919); Philadelphia Phillies (1919–1920)

Walter Joseph Tragesser (June 14, 1887 – October 2, 1970) was a professional baseball player. He was a catcher over parts of seven seasons (1913, 1915–1920) with the Boston Braves and Philadelphia Phillies. For his career, he compiled a .215 batting average, with six home runs and 66 runs batted in.

An alumnus of Purdue University, where he played college baseball for the Boilermakers from 1908–1909, he was born and later died in Lafayette, Indiana at the age of 83.
