= 2026 Indiana Hoosiers baseball team =

American college baseball season

2026 Indiana Hoosiers baseball
- Conference: Big Ten Conference
- Record: 23–31 (9–21 Big Ten)
- Head coach: Jeff Mercer (8th season)
- Hitting coach: Zach Weatherford (3rd season)
- Pitching coach: Dustin Glant (5th season)
- Home stadium: Bart Kaufman Field (Capacity: 2,500)

2026 Big Ten Conference baseball standings
	Conf.						Overall
Team	W		L		T	PCT	W		L		T	PCT
No. 11 UCLA ‍†‍‡‍^{y}	28	–	2	–	0	.933	48	–	6	–	0	.889
Nebraska ‍‍‍^{y}	23	–	7	–	0	.767	41	–	14	–	0	.745
No. 13 Oregon ‍‍‍^{y}	20	–	10	–	0	.667	38	–	15	–	0	.717
No. 15 USC ‍‍‍^{y}	20	–	10	–	0	.667	42	–	14	–	0	.750
Purdue ‍‍‍	18	–	13	–	0	.581	36	–	18	–	0	.667
Ohio State ‍‍‍	18	–	12	–	0	.600	29	–	24	–	0	.547
Michigan ‍‍‍	17	–	13	–	0	.567	33	–	22	–	0	.600
Iowa ‍‍‍	15	–	15	–	0	.500	30	–	21	–	0	.588
Illinois ‍‍‍	14	–	16	–	0	.467	27	–	27	–	0	.500
Rutgers ‍‍‍	13	–	17	–	0	.433	26	–	29	–	0	.473
Washington ‍‍‍	12	–	18	–	0	.400	23	–	31	–	0	.426
Michigan State ‍‍‍	12	–	19	–	0	.387	22	–	31	–	0	.415
Minnesota ‍‍‍	11	–	19	–	0	.367	30	–	23	–	0	.566
Maryland ‍‍‍	9	–	21	–	0	.300	27	–	29	–	0	.482
Indiana ‍‍‍	9	–	21	–	0	.300	23	–	31	–	0	.426
Penn State ‍‍‍	9	–	21	–	0	.300	16	–	35	–	0	.314
Northwestern ‍‍‍	8	–	22	–	0	.267	21	–	30	–	1	.413
† – Conference champion ‡ – Tournament champion y – Invited to the NCAA tournament As of May 19, 2026; Rankings from D1Baseball

The 2026 Indiana Hoosiers baseball team was a college baseball team that represented Indiana University in the 2026 NCAA Division I baseball season. The Hoosiers are a member of the Big Ten Conference (B!G) and play their home games at Bart Kaufman Field in Bloomington, Indiana, and were led by eight-year head coach Jeff Mercer.

== Previous season ==
The Hoosiers finished the 2025 season 31-23 (11-19 conference) good for 15th place in the Big Ten standings.

== Roster ==
2026 Indiana Hoosiers roster
Pitchers	Catchers Infielders	Outfielders	Two Way Players

=== Coaches ===
2026 Indiana Hoosiers baseball coaching staff
- Jeff Mercer – Head coach – 8th season
- Zach Weatherford – Assistant coach – 3rd season
- Dustin Glant – Assistant coach – 5th season

Note: Season counter accounts for all stints at Indiana.

== Personnel ==
=== Starters ===
Opening Night Lineup
Pos.	No.	Player.	Year
--	--	--	--
--	--	--	--
--	--	--	--
--	--	--	--
--	--	--	--
--	--	--	--
--	--	--	--
--	--	--	--
--	--	--	--

Weekend pitching rotation
Day	No.	Player.	Year
Friday	--	--	--
Saturday	--	--	--
Sunday	--	--	--

== Schedule and results ==
2026 Indiana Hoosiers baseball game log (Overall: 0–0; Conference: 0–0); (Home: 0–0; Away: 0–0)
Regular season (0–0)
February (0–0)
(Home; 0–0; Away: 0–0)

Date	Time (PST)	Opponent	Rank	TV	Venue	Score	Win	Loss	Save	Attendance	Overall record	B1G record

March (0–0)
(Home; 0–0; Away: 0–0)

Date	Time	Opponent	Rank	TV	Venue	Score	Win	Loss	Save	Attendance	Overall record	B1G record

April (0–0)
(Home; 0–0; Away: 0–0)

Date	Time	Opponent	Rank	TV	Venue	Score	Win	Loss	Save	Attendance	Overall record	B1G record

May (0–0)
(Home: 0–0; Away: 0–0)

Date	Time	Opponent	Rank	TV	Venue	Score	Win	Loss	Save	Attendance	Overall record	B1G record

"#" represents ranking. All rankings from D1 Baseball Poll on the date of the contest.
"()" represents postseason seeding in the Big Ten Tournament or NCAA Regional, respectively.
= Win, = Loss, = Canceled/Postponed
Bold = **Indiana Hoosiers team member**
* = Non-Conference Game
Schedule Source:

== Ranking movements ==
Ranking movements
	Week																			
Poll	Pre	1	2	3	4	5	6	7	8	9	10	11	12	13	14	15	16	17	18	Final
Coaches'		*																		
Baseball America																				
NCBWA†																				

† NCBWA ranks 30 teams in their preseason poll, but only ranks 25 teams weekly during the season.
* A new poll was not released for this week, so for comparison purposes, the previous week's ranking is inserted in this week's slot.
