= Mel Taube =

American athlete, coach, and administrator (1904–1979)

Biographical details
- Born: December 20, 1904; Detroit, Michigan, U.S.
- Died: June 15, 1979 (aged 74); Clearwater, Florida, U.S.

Playing career

Football
- 1923–1925: Purdue

Basketball
- 1924–1926: Purdue

Baseball
- 1924–1926: Purdue
- Position: Quarterback (football)

Coaching career (HC unless noted)

Football
- 1926–1927: Purdue (assistant)
- 1931–1935: Massachusetts State
- 1936–1942: Purdue (assistant)
- 1946: Purdue (assistant)
- 1950–1959: Carleton (assistant)
- 1960–1969: Carleton

Basketball
- 1933–1936: Massachusetts State
- 1936–1942: Purdue (assistant)
- 1945–1950: Purdue
- 1950–1960: Carleton

Baseball
- 1932–1935: Massachusetts State
- 1947–1950: Purdue
- 1951–1970: Carleton

Administrative career (AD unless noted)
- 1959–1970: Carleton

Head coaching record
- Overall: 62–58–5 (football); 201–142 (basketball)

Accomplishments and honors

Championships
- Basketball; 4 MWC (1952–1954, 1958) Baseball; 3 MWC (1953, 1957, 1964)

Melvin Henry Taube (December 20, 1904 – June 15, 1979) was an American college football, college basketball, and college baseball player, coach, and athletics administrator. He served as the head football coach at Massachusetts State College, from 1931 to 1935 and at Carleton College from 1960 to 1969, compiling a career college football head coaching record of 62–58–5. Taube was also the head basketball coach at Massachusetts State College (1933–1936), Purdue University (1945–1950), and Carleton (1950–1960), amassing a career college basketball head coaching mark of 201–142 and winning four Midwest Conference championships. He was the head baseball coach at Massachusetts State (1932–1935), Purdue (1947–1950), and Carleton (1951–1970), tallying a career college baseball head coaching record of 93–74–3. A three-sport letterman, Taube played football, basketball, and baseball at Purdue.

== Coaching career ==
Taube spent 20 seasons at Carleton College, arriving in the summer of 1950 as the head basketball and head baseball coach. He was also an assistant football coach until assuming the role of head football coach in 1960, following the death of Warren Beson. Taube served as Carleton's head football coach, head baseball coach, and athletic director until his retirement in 1970.

In his honor, Carleton annually awards the Mel Taube Award to a varsity athlete for "dedication, loyalty, competitive spirit, and excellence in athletics." In 2008, the Carleton baseball field was named for Taube.

== Early life, education and military service ==
Taube received a bachelor's degree from Purdue University in 1926 and a Master of Science from Indiana University in 1933. He served in the United States Navy from 1943 to 1945 and became a lieutenant.

== Death ==
Taube died on June 15, 1979, at Morton Plant Hospital in Morton Plant Hospital.

== Head coaching record ==
=== Football ===
Year	Team	Overall	Conference	Standing	Bowl/playoffs
Massachusetts State Aggies (Independent) (1931–1935)
1931	Massachusetts State	7–1–1			
1932	Massachusetts State	7–2			
1933	Massachusetts State	5–3			
1934	Massachusetts State	5–3–1			
1935	Massachusetts State	5–4			
Massachusetts State:		29–13–2			
Carleton Knights (Midwest Conference) (1960–1969)
1960	Carleton	5–3	5–3	4th	
1961	Carleton	5–2–1	5–2–1	4th	
1962	Carleton	4–4	4–4	6th	
1963	Carleton	5–2–1	5–2–1	2nd	
1964	Carleton	0–8	0–8	10th	
1965	Carleton	3–5	3–5	7th	
1966	Carleton	3–5	3–5	T–5th	
1967	Carleton	2–5–1	2–5–1	8th	
1968	Carleton	3–5	3–5	T–6th	
1969	Carleton	3–6	3–6	8th	
Carleton:		33–45–3	33–45–3		
Total:		62–58–5			

=== Basketball ===
Record table
Season	Team	Overall	Conference	Standing	Postseason
Massachusetts State Aggies (Independent) (1933–1936)
1933–34	Massachusetts State	12–0			
1934–35	Massachusetts State	6–6			
1935–36	Massachusetts State	2–12			
Massachusetts State:		20–18			
Purdue Boilermakers (Big Ten Conference) (1945–1950)
1945–46	Purdue	3–4	2–4	8th	
1946–47	Purdue	9–11	4–8	8th	
1947–48	Purdue	11–9	6–6	5th	
1948–49	Purdue	13–9	6–6	T–4th	
1949–50	Purdue	9–13	3–9	T–8th	
Purdue:		45–46	21–33		
Carleton Carls/Knights (Midwest Conference) (1950–1960)
1950–51	Carleton	13–7	7–3	3rd	
1951–52	Carleton	18–4	10–0	1st	
1952–53	Carleton	18–4	10–2	T–1st	
1953–54	Carleton	17–5	9–3	T–1st	
1954–55	Carleton	16–6	10–2	2nd	
1955–56	Carleton	7–15	6–10	6th	
1956–57	Carleton	12–10	9–7	4th	
1957–58	Carleton	16–5	12–4	T–1st	
1958–59	Carleton	9–12	8–8	5th	
1959–60	Carleton	10–12	9–9	T–5th	
Carleton:		136–80	83–45		
Total:		201–142			
National champion Postseason invitational champion Conference regular season champion Conference regular season and conference tournament champion Division regular season champion Division regular season and conference tournament champion Conference tournament champion

=== Baseball ===
Record table
Season	Team	Overall	Conference	Standing	Postseason
Massachusetts State Aggies (Independent) (1932–1935)
1932	Massachusetts State	9–6			
1933	Massachusetts State	7–5			
1934	Massachusetts State	8–5			
1935	Massachusetts State	7–6			
Massachusetts State Aggies:		31–22			
Purdue Boilermakers (Big Ten Conference) (1947–1950)
1947	Purdue	13–10	4–9	8th	
1948	Purdue	14–7–1	8–6	4th	
1949	Purdue	14–9–2	7–5	3rd	
1950	Purdue	11–14	2–8	8th	
Purdue:		52–40–3	21–28		
Carleton Knights (Midwest Conference) (1951–1970)
1951	Carleton				
1952	Carleton				
1953	Carleton		6–2	1st	
1954	Carleton		3–5	T–4th	
1955	Carleton		1–2	T–4th	
1956	Carleton		1–4	3rd (North)	
1957	Carleton		4–2	1st (North)	
1958	Carleton		2–1	1st (Minnesota)	
1959	Carleton		5–3	2nd (North)	
1960	Carleton		3–4	T–2nd (North)	
1961	Carleton		0–2	5th (North)	
1962	Carleton		3–5	4th (North)	
1963	Carleton		2–6	5th (North)	
1964	Carleton		7–1	1st (North)	
1965	Carleton		4–4	3rd (North)	
1966	Carleton		2–4	3rd (North)	
1967	Carleton		4–4	T–2nd (North)	
1968	Carleton		0–6	T–4th (North)	
1969	Carleton		3–5	4th (North)	
1970	Carleton		5–3	2nd (North)	
Carleton:					
Total:					
National champion Postseason invitational champion Conference regular season champion Conference regular season and conference tournament champion Division regular season champion Division regular season and conference tournament champion Conference tournament champion
