= Mark Wasikowski =

American college baseball coach (born 1971)

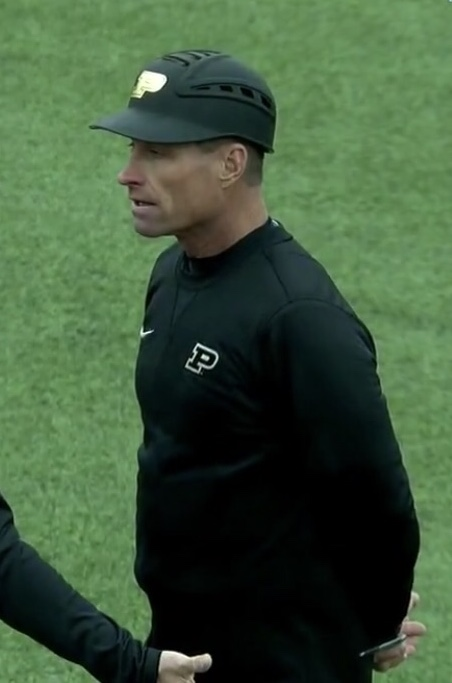

Current position
- Title: Head coach
- Team: Oregon
- Conference: Big Ten
- Record: 249–124

Biographical details
- Born: March 24, 1971 (age 55); Seal Beach, California, U.S.
- Education: Pepperdine University

Playing career
- 1990: Hawaii
- 1991: Santa Ana College
- 1992–1993: Pepperdine
- Position: Third baseman

Coaching career (HC unless noted)
- 1994: Pepperdine (undergrad)
- 1997–1998: Southeast Missouri State (assistant)
- 1999–2001: Florida (assistant)
- 2002–2011: Arizona (assistant)
- 2012–2016: Oregon (assistant)
- 2017–2019: Purdue
- 2020–present: Oregon

Head coaching record
- Overall: 336–206
- Tournaments: Big Ten: 6–5; Pac 12: 6–5; NCAA: 13–12

Accomplishments and honors

Championships
- Pac 12 Conference Tournament (2023); Big 10 regular season (2025)

Awards
- Big Ten Coach of the Year (2025); 2× All-West Coast Conference (1992, 1993)

Mark P. Wasikowski (born March 24, 1971) is an American college baseball coach, currently serving as head coach of the Oregon Ducks baseball team.

Wasikowski was a third baseman at Hawaii, Rancho Santiago and Pepperdine and was on the team that won the 1992 College World Series. He later earned All-West Coast Conference honors twice and was a team captain as a senior in 1993. Following the 1993 season, Wasikowski was drafted by the Milwaukee Brewers, but he opted to stay at Pepperdine to complete his bachelor's degree. Beginning in 1997, Wasikowski was a graduate assistant at Southeast Missouri State University. Upon completion of the 1998 season, Wasikowski was named an assistant at Florida, where he was reunited with his former coach, Andy Lopez. Wasikowski would go with Lopez to Arizona, where he spent 10 season with the Wildcats. In 2012, Wasikowski was hired to be an assistant at Oregon.

On July 24, 2016, Wasikowski earned his first head coaching job at Purdue. On February 17, 2017, Wasikowski won his first ever game as a college coach.

== Early life ==
Wasikowski attended Los Alamitos High School in Los Alamitos, California. Wasikowski was a three-year starter at shortstop on the school's baseball team. On April 25, 1989, Wasikowski signed with the Hawaii Rainbow Warriors baseball team.

== Playing career ==
Wasikowski lettered for the Rainbow Warriors during the 1990 season. He transferred to the Rancho Santiago Community College District and played for the Santa Ana College Dons. His play for the Dons earned him a scholarship to Pepperdine University.

As a sophomore in 1992, Wasikowski batted .311 with a .466 SLG, 4 home runs, and 31 RBIs and lead the team with 18 doubles. He was named second team All-West Coast Conference. Pepperdine went a perfect 4–0 en route to a victory in the 1992 College World Series.

In the 1993 season as a senior, the Waves had almost an entirely new roster. He was named first team All-WCC. Wasikowski lead the team in at bats (224) and hits (70), but the Waves were eliminated in the West Regional.

During the 1993 MLB draft, Wasikowski was selected in the 35th round by the Milwaukee Brewers.

== Coaching career ==
=== Southeast Missouri State ===
In 1997, Wasikowski was hired as a graduate assistant under head coach Mark Hogan. In 1998, Wasikowski helped the RedHawks qualify for their first ever NCAA Regional appearance.

=== Florida ===
In 1999, Wasikowski joined the Florida Gators baseball staff under his former Pepperdine head coach, Andy Lopez.

=== Arizona ===
When Lopez was hired at Arizona, he brought Wasikowski with him on his staff. During Wasikowski's 10 years on the staff, the Wildcats earned 7 Regional berths and a trip to the 2004 College World Series.

=== Oregon ===
In 2012, Wasikowski was hired by the Oregon Ducks baseball program.

== Purdue ==
Wasikowski inherited a team that went 10–44 in 2016 finishing last in the Big Ten Conference. Wasikowski guided the Boilermakers to a 29–25 regular season, clinching the 8th seed in the 2017 Big Ten Conference baseball tournament. Purdue's 19 win improvement in 2017 from 2016 was the largest improvement in NCAA Division I baseball during the 2017 season.

== Oregon ==
On June 11, 2019, Wasikowski returned to Oregon as the head coach.

== Head coaching record ==
Record table
Season	Team	Overall	Conference	Standing	Postseason
Purdue Boilermakers (Big Ten Conference) (2017–2019)
2017	Purdue	29–27	12–12	8th	Big Ten tournament
2018	Purdue	38–21	17–6	2nd	NCAA Regional
2019	Purdue	20–34	7–16	12th	
Purdue:		87–82 (.515)	36–34 (.514)		
Oregon Ducks (Pac-12 Conference) (2020–2024)
2020	Oregon	8–7	0–0		Season canceled due to COVID-19
2021	Oregon	39–16	20–10	2nd	NCAA Regional
2022	Oregon	36–25	18–12	4th	NCAA Regional
2023	Oregon	41–22	16–14	6th	NCAA Super Regional
2024	Oregon	40–20	19–11	3rd	NCAA Super Regional
Oregon:		– (–)	77–47 (.621)		
Oregon Ducks (Big Ten Conference) (2025–present)
2025	Oregon	42–16	22–8	T–1st	NCAA Regional
2026	Oregon	43–18	20–10	T–3rd	NCAA Super Regional
Oregon:		249–124 (.668)			
Total:		336–206 (.620)			
National champion Postseason invitational champion Conference regular season champion Conference regular season and conference tournament champion Division regular season champion Division regular season and conference tournament champion Conference tournament champion

== See also ==
- List of current NCAA Division I baseball coaches
