= 2024 Big Ten baseball tournament =

American college baseball tournament

- Teams: 8
- Format: Double-elimination
- Finals site: Charles Schwab Field Omaha; Omaha, Nebraska
- Champions: Nebraska (1st title)
- Runner-up: Penn State (2nd title game)
- Winning coach: Will Bolt (1st title)
- Television: BTN

2024 Big Ten Conference baseball standings
| | Conf. | | | | | | Overall |
| Team | W | | L | | T | PCT | W | | L | | T | PCT |
|---|---|---|---|---|---|---|---|---|---|---|---|---|
| Illinois ‍†‍‍^{y} | 18 | – | 6 | – | 0 | .750 | 35 | – | 21 | – | 0 | .625 |
| Nebraska ‍‍‡‍^{y} | 16 | – | 8 | – | 0 | .667 | 40 | – | 22 | – | 0 | .645 |
| Indiana ‍‍‍^{y} | 15 | – | 9 | – | 0 | .625 | 33 | – | 26 | – | 1 | .558 |
| Iowa ‍‍‍ | 14 | – | 10 | – | 0 | .583 | 31 | – | 23 | – | 0 | .574 |
| Michigan ‍‍‍ | 14 | – | 10 | – | 0 | .583 | 32 | – | 28 | – | 0 | .533 |
| Purdue ‍‍‍ | 13 | – | 11 | – | 0 | .542 | 33 | – | 24 | – | 0 | .579 |
| Ohio State ‍‍‍ | 12 | – | 12 | – | 0 | .500 | 29 | – | 26 | – | 0 | .527 |
| Penn State ‍‍‍ | 12 | – | 12 | – | 0 | .500 | 29 | – | 24 | – | 0 | .547 |
| Minnesota ‍‍‍ | 11 | – | 13 | – | 0 | .458 | 25 | – | 23 | – | 0 | .521 |
| Michigan State ‍‍‍ | 11 | – | 13 | – | 0 | .458 | 24 | – | 27 | – | 0 | .471 |
| Maryland ‍‍‍ | 10 | – | 14 | – | 0 | .417 | 34 | – | 22 | – | 0 | .607 |
| Rutgers ‍‍‍ | 6 | – | 18 | – | 0 | .250 | 28 | – | 25 | – | 0 | .528 |
| Northwestern ‍‍‍ | 4 | – | 20 | – | 0 | .167 | 18 | – | 34 | – | 0 | .346 |
† – Conference champion ‡ – Tournament champion y – Invited to the NCAA tournament As of May 26, 2024; Rankings from D1Baseball

The 2024 Big Ten baseball tournament was held at Charles Schwab Field Omaha in Omaha, Nebraska, from May 21 through May 26, and aired on the Big Ten Network. As the tournament winner, Nebraska earned the Big Ten Conference's automatic bid to the 2024 NCAA Division I baseball tournament.

== Format and seeding ==
The 2024 tournament was a double-elimination tournament among the top eight Big Ten Conference baseball teams with the best regular season winning percentage. These eight teams received tournament seeds, numbered one through eight, according to the team's final placement in the regular season standings. In terms of tournament games played per day, the tournament used a 3-2-3-2-4-1 format, with competition beginning one day earlier than in past years to allow for flexibility in case having to suspend play due to inclement weather.

== Bracket ==
First round
1 | Illinois | 4
8 | Penn State | 8
4 | Michigan | 3^{(10)}
5 | Iowa | 2
1 | Illinois | 4^{(10)}
5 | Iowa | 2
2 | Nebraska | 2^{(7)}
7 | Ohio State | 15
3 | Indiana | 8
6 | Purdue | 6
6 | Purdue | 2
2 | Nebraska | 6

Second round
8 | Penn State | 9
4 | Michigan | 5
1 | Illinois | 2
4 | Michigan | 4
7 | Ohio State | 7
3 | Indiana | 14
2 | Nebraska | 12
7 | Ohio State | 5

Semifinals
8 | Penn State | 7^{(10)} | –
4 | Michigan | 6 | –
3 | Indiana | 2 | 4
2 | Nebraska | 4 | 10

Finals
8 | Penn State | 1
2 | Nebraska | 2

== Schedule ==
| Game | Time* | Matchup^{#} | Score | Television |
Tuesday, May 21
| 1 | 5:00 p.m. | No. 3 Indiana vs. No. 6 Purdue | 8–6 | BTN |
| 2 | 9:00 p.m. | No. 2 Nebraska vs. No. 7 Ohio State | 15–2^{(7)} | BTN |
| Wednesday, May 22 | | | | BTN |
| 3 | 11:00 a.m. | No. 1 Illinois vs. No. 8 Penn State | 4–8 | BTN |
| 4 | 2:00 p.m. | No. 4 Michigan vs. No. 5 Iowa | 3–2^{(10)} | BTN |
| 5 | 7:00 p.m. | No. 6 Purdue vs. No. 2 Nebraska | 2–6 | BTN |
Thursday, May 23
| 6 | 10:00 a.m. | No. 1 Illinois vs. No. 5 Iowa | 4–2^{(10)} | BTN |
| 7 | 2:00 p.m. | No. 3 Indiana vs. No. 7 Ohio State | 14–7 | BTN |
| 8 | 6:00 p.m. | No. 8 Penn State vs. No. 4 Michigan | 9–5 | BTN |
Friday, May 24
| 9 | 2:00 p.m. | No. 2 Nebraska vs. No. 7 Ohio State | 12–5 | BTN |
| 10 | 7:00 p.m. | No. 1 Illinois vs. No. 4 Michigan | 2–4 | BTN |
Semifinals - Saturday, May 25
| 11 | 9:00 a.m. | No. 3 Indiana vs. No. 2 Nebraska | 2–4 | BTN |
| 12 | 6:00 p.m. | No. 3 Indiana vs. No. 2 Nebraska | 4–10 | BTN |
| 13 | 2:00 p.m. | No. 8 Penn State vs. No. 4 Michigan | 7–6^{(10)} | BTN |
Championship – Sunday, May 26
| 14 | 11:00 a.m. | No. 8 Penn State vs. No. 2 Nebraska | 1–2 | BTN |
*Game times in CDT. # – Rankings denote tournament seed.
