= 2026 Big Ten baseball tournament =

American college baseball tournament

- Teams: 12
- Format: Double- and Single-elimination
- Finals site: Charles Schwab Field Omaha; Omaha, Nebraska
- Champions: UCLA (1st title)
- Runner-up: Oregon (1st title game)
- Winning coach: John Savage (1st title)
- MVP: Mulivai Levu (UCLA)
- Television: BTN

2026 Big Ten Conference baseball standings
	Conf.						Overall
Team	W		L		T	PCT	W		L		T	PCT
No. 1 UCLA ‍†‍‡‍^{y}	28	–	2	–	0	.933	48	–	6	–	0	.889
No. 20 Nebraska ‍‍‍^{y}	23	–	7	–	0	.767	41	–	14	–	0	.745
No. 15 Oregon ‍‍‍^{y}	20	–	10	–	0	.667	38	–	15	–	0	.717
USC ‍‍‍^{y}	20	–	10	–	0	.667	42	–	14	–	0	.750
Purdue ‍‍‍	18	–	13	–	0	.581	36	–	18	–	0	.667
Ohio State ‍‍‍	18	–	12	–	0	.600	29	–	24	–	0	.547
Michigan ‍‍‍	17	–	13	–	0	.567	33	–	22	–	0	.600
Iowa ‍‍‍	15	–	15	–	0	.500	30	–	21	–	0	.588
Illinois ‍‍‍	14	–	16	–	0	.467	27	–	27	–	0	.500
Rutgers ‍‍‍	13	–	17	–	0	.433	26	–	29	–	0	.473
Washington ‍‍‍	12	–	18	–	0	.400	23	–	31	–	0	.426
Michigan State ‍‍‍	12	–	19	–	0	.387	22	–	31	–	0	.415
Minnesota ‍‍‍	11	–	19	–	0	.367	30	–	23	–	0	.566
Maryland ‍‍‍	9	–	21	–	0	.300	27	–	29	–	0	.482
Indiana ‍‍‍	9	–	21	–	0	.300	23	–	31	–	0	.426
Penn State ‍‍‍	9	–	21	–	0	.300	16	–	35	–	0	.314
Northwestern ‍‍‍	8	–	22	–	0	.267	21	–	30	–	1	.413
† – Conference champion ‡ – Tournament champion y – Invited to the NCAA tournament As of May 19, 2026; Rankings from D1Baseball

The 2026 Big Ten baseball tournament was held at Charles Schwab Field Omaha in Omaha, Nebraska, from May 19 through May 24, airing on the Big Ten Network.

== Format and seeding ==
The top twelve teams with the best regular season conference winning percentage participated in the 2026 tournament. These twelve teams received tournament seeds, number one through twelve, according to the team's final placement in the regular season standings. The tournament was contested as a double-elimination tournament for seeds 5 through 12 for the first three days to qualify four teams. The four advancing teams met seeds 1 through 4 in the Single-elimination tournament to crown a champion. A run rule (10 run lead after 7 innings) were in effect for the tournament.

== Bracket ==
=== Double elimination bracket ===
Opening round May 19–20
5	Purdue	4
12	Michigan State	8
Winner's bracket
8	Iowa	10
9	Illinois	6
5	Purdue	3
9	Illinois	1
Loser's bracket

Qualification; May 20–21
12	Michigan State	4
8	Iowa	3
5	Purdue	8
8	Iowa	1

Opening round May 19–20
7	Michigan	10^{(7)}
10	Rutgers	0
Winner's bracket
6	Ohio State	6
11	Washington	8
10	Rutgers	2
6	Ohio State	3
Loser's bracket

Qualification; May 20–21
7	Michigan	1
11	Washington	7
6	Ohio State	0
7	Michigan	3

==== Single elimination bracket ====
Quarterfinals; May 22
4	USC	7
12	Michigan State	0
1	UCLA	4
5	Purdue	3
2	Nebraska	6
7	Michigan	4
3	Oregon	9
11	Washington	4

Semifinals May 23
4	USC	5
1	UCLA	7
2	Nebraska	0
3	Oregon	8

Final May 24
1	UCLA	3^{(11)}
3	Oregon	2

== Schedule ==
2026 Bracket, home teams listed last.

Game	Time*	Matchup^{#}	Score	Television	Attendance
Double elimination – Opening round – Tuesday, May 19
1	9:00 a.m.	No. 5 Purdue vs No. 12 Michigan State	4–8	BTN	
2	1:00 p.m.	No. 8 Iowa vs No. 9 Illinois	10–6	BTN	
3	5:00 p.m.	No. 7 Michigan vs No. 10 Rutgers	10–0^{(7)}	BTN	
4	9:00 p.m.	No. 6 Ohio State vs No. 11 Washington	6–8	BTN	
Double elimination – Loser round – Wednesday, May 20
5	9:00 a.m.	No. 5 Purdue vs No. 9 Illinois	3–1	BTN	
6	1:00 p.m.	No. 10 Rutgers vs No. 6 Ohio State	2–3	BTN	
Double elimination – Qualification round – Wednesday, May 20
7	5:00 p.m.	No. 12 Michigan State vs No. 8 Iowa	4–3	BTN	
8	9:00 p.m.	No. 7 Michigan vs No. 11 Washington	1–7	BTN	
Double elimination – Qualification round - Thursday, May 21
9	2:00 p.m.	No. 5 Purdue vs No. 8 Iowa	8–1	BTN	
10	6:00 p.m.	No. 6 Ohio State vs No. 7 Michigan	0–3	BTN	
Single elimination – Quarterfinals - Friday, May 22 / Saturday, May 23
11	9:00 a.m.	No. 4 USC vs No. 12 Michigan State	7–0	BTN	
12	7:00 p.m.	No. 1 UCLA vs No. 5 Purdue	4–3	BTN	
13	11:00 p.m.	No. 2 Nebraska vs No. 7 Michigan	6–4	BTN	
14	10:00 a.m.	No. 3 Oregon vs No. 11 Washington	9–4	BTN	
Single elimination – Semifinals - Saturday, May 23
15	2:20 p.m.	No. 4 USC vs No. 1 UCLA	5–7	BTN	
16	7:00 p.m.	No. 3 Oregon vs No. 2 Nebraska	8–0	BTN	
Single elimination – Championship - Sunday, May 24
17	2:00 p.m.	No. 1 UCLA vs No. 3 Oregon	3–2^{(11)}	BTN	
*Game times in CDT. # – Rankings denote tournament seed.

== All-tournament team ==
The following players are members of the 2026 Big Ten Baseball All-Tournament Team. Player in Bold selected as Tournament MVP.

Position	Player	School
C	Noah Miller	Michigan
1B	**Mulivai Levu**	UCLA
2B	Dylan Drake	Purdue
3B	Drew Smith	Oregon
SS	Henry Kaczmar	Ohio State
DH	Naulivou Lauaki Jr.	Oregon
OF	Angel Laya	Oregon
OF	Will Gasparino	UCLA
OF	Mic Paul	Washington
P	Shane Brinham	Michigan
P	Cal Scolari	Oregon
P	Will Sanford	Oregon
