= 2025 Oregon State Beavers baseball team =

College baseball team in the 2025 NCAA Division I season

2025 Oregon State Beavers baseball

Corvallis Super Regional champions Corvallis Regional champions

College World Series, 1–2
- Conference: Independent

Ranking
- Coaches: No. 4
- D1Baseball.com: No. 4
- Record: 48–16–1
- Head coach: Mitch Canham (6th season)
- Assistant coaches: Ryan Gipson (7th season); Joey Wong (2nd season)
- Pitching coach: Rich Dorman (6th season)
- Home stadium: Goss Stadium at Coleman Field

2025 NCAA Division I baseball independents standings
	Conf.						Overall
Team	W		L		T	PCT	W		L		T	PCT
No. 4 Oregon State ‍‍‍^{y}	0	–	0	–	0	–	48	–	16	–	1	.746
y – Invited to the NCAA tournament As of June 23, 2025; Rankings from D1Baseball

The 2025 Oregon State Beavers baseball team represented Oregon State University in the 2025 NCAA Division I baseball season. The Beavers played their home games at Goss Stadium at Coleman Field. The team was led by Mitch Canham, the Pat Casey Head Baseball Coach, in his sixth season at Oregon State.

The team competed as an independent, as the university is one of only two remaining members of the Pac-12 Conference.

== Preseason ==
The Beavers were unanimously selected a preseason Top-10 team by all five major poll organizations (No. 7 by D1Baseball.com, NCBWA & USAToday Coaches Poll; No. 9 by Perfect Game; and No. 10 by Baseball America).

Oregon State made a recruiting splash by signing Aiva Arquette, the All-Pac-12 infielder from Washington and top player in the transfer portal. Perfect Game placed Arquette on their 2025 preseason All-America first team. He also received second-team preseason honors by Baseball America and NCBWA.

Outfielder Trent Caraway joined Arquette as a preseason All-American, when Baseball America named him to the first team and Perfect Game placed him on their third team.

Arquette and outfielder Gavin Turley landed on the Golden Spikes Award initial watch list. Adley Rutschman won the award in 2019, while Cooper Hjerpe (2022) and Travis Bazzana (2024) were finalists.

== Regular season ==
The team set the school record for home runs in a game with eight in a 16–5 win over Nebraska on March 29. Six different players hit a home run, led by Gavin Turley with three. Turley finished the day 4-for-4 with three runs and six runs batted in, including a grand slam. Aiva Arquette, Jacob Krieg, Wilson Weber, Easton Talt, and AJ Singer also hit home runs in the game. Additionally, the Beavers hit for the rare home run cycle with a solo home run, a two-run home run, a three-run home run, and a grand slam. The team hit at least one home run in each of the seven innings before the 10-run rule brought the game to an early end.

Gavin Turley took sole possession of the career home runs record when he hit the 46th of his Oregon State career in a win over CSUN on April 19. The previous record of 45 had been set last season by Travis Bazzana.

Starting second baseman Jabin Trosky was sidelined indefinitely with an undisclosed injury prior to the series at Cal Poly. He had previously missed the 2023 season after undergoing right elbow surgery. On May 23, it was announced Trosky had entered the transfer portal and removed from the team's official roster.

Closing pitcher Matt Morrell was lost for the season after he underwent Tommy John surgery. His final appearance was in relief on March 14 in a win over Grand Canyon, where he picked up the save. He was 1–0 with three saves during the 2025 campaign.

Accolades
Freshman Dax Whitney was selected as the National Pitcher of the Week by Perfect Game following a dominant performance against UNLV in his first college start. Whitney threw five innings, allowed no runs on four hits, and struck out eight batters on only 84 pitches.

Aiva Arquette was named the Brooks Wallace Award Player of the Week by the College Baseball Foundation, given to the nation's most outstanding shortstop, following a dominant Week 2 performance. Arquette went 11-for-25 with three home runs, 10 runs batted in, six walks and eight runs scored. After leading the Beavers into the Super Regional round of the NCAA Tournament, Arquette was named a finalist for the Brooks Wallace Award.

Arquette picked up the NCBWA Dick Howser Trophy National Player of the Week award for the period ending April 13. In the four games played he batted .500 (9-for-18), recorded seven runs, accounted for 11 runs batted in, had a 1.277 slugging percentage, and finished with two doubles, four home runs and four walks. On May 15, Aiva Arquette and Gavin Turley were named semifinalists for the NCBWA Dick Howser Trophy presented by The Game Headwear.

Following a midweek win over No. 10 UCLA and three game sweep of CSUN, USA Baseball named Arquette their Golden Spikes Award Week 10 Player of the Week. In the four games played he went 11-for-17 from the plate (.647 batting average), scored 12 runs and tallied 11 runs batted in. In the April 19 finale against CSUN he tied an Oregon State record for most hits in a game, going a perfect 6-for-6. He was among the 45 players named to the Golden Spikes Award midseason watch list. Arquette was later included on the list of 25 Golden Spikes Award semifinalists, and one of only five semifinalists to also appear on both the preseason and midseason lists.

Wilson Weber garnered the NCBWA Dick Howser Trophy National Player of the Week award for the period ending May 11, where he was instrumental to the Beavers going 3–0–1 at Hawaii and Iowa. He hit safely in all four games, went 8-for-17 at the dish (.471), hit four home runs, scored five runs, and drove in a total of 12 runs. Weber collected four hits and drove in the game winning run in the opener at Iowa. The following week he was selected as one of thirteen semifinalists for the Buster Posey Award, given annually to the nation's top collegiate catcher.

== Postseason ==
The Beavers earned the No. 8 seed in the 2025 NCAA Tournament, ensuring they would play all their games at home as they sought their first trip to Omaha since winning the national championship in 2018. This is the 13th time Oregon State has hosted a regional, and the third of the Mitch Canham era. Entering this season, the Beavers are 30–7 all-time when hosting.

Corvallis Regional
After dropping their opener against Saint Mary's 4–6, Oregon State blasted their way through the loser's bracket, eliminating TCU, Saint Mary's, and USC by a combined score of 50–6, earning them a matchup with Tallahassee Regional winner Florida State.

Gavin Turley, already Oregon State's career home run record holder, broke the Oregon State career record for RBIs by hitting a single in the 9th inning that drove in the final run of the Beaver's 20–3 victory over Saint Mary's. This passed the previous record holder, Michael Conforto, who ended his Oregon State career (2012–14) with 179 RBIs.

Corvallis Super Regional
Oregon State opened their Super Regional against Florida State with a 5–4 come-from-behind win in extra innings. Down 1–4 in the bottom of the 9th inning, Wilson Weber hit a single, sparking the rally. Pinch-hitter Bryce Hubbard was walked and pinch-hitter Dallas Macias singled to load the bases. A wild pitch allowed Weber to score, which cut the lead to 2–4. Jacob Kreig hit a single to left field that scored two more runs and tied the game 4–4. In the 10th inning, Aiva Arquette hit a double, Gavin Turley singled, and Wilson Weber was walked, loading the bases before a walk-off hit into deep center field by AJ Singer completed the rally.

After losing Game 2, 1–3, the Beavers took advantage of Florida State's depleted pitching staff to secure winner-take-all Game 3, 14–10. Oregon State scored 13 runs in the first three innings, including a grand slam by Trent Caraway. Florida State used six pitchers throughout the game but it wasn't enough to stop the Beavers, who ended the day with five home runs. The victory secured Oregon State's eighth trip to the College World Series, the first of Mitch Canham's tenure as head coach.

== College World Series ==
Oregon State vs. Louisville (Game 2)

On June 13, Oregon State defeated Louisville 4–3 in their opening game. Both teams were bolstered by starting pitchers Dax Whitney (Oregon State) and Patrick Forbes (Louisville). Whitney recorded nine strike outs, while Forbes racked up ten, both lasting 5 1/3 innings. Oregon State scored first with two runs in the 4th. Both teams scored runs in the 6th, which put Oregon State up 3–1, and set up a dramatic finish in the 9th inning.

Louisville led off the top of the 9th with a single by Zion Rose to left field that turned into a triple after Gavin Turley missed on a diving attempt at the ball. The next batter, Tague Davis, hit a single that scored Rose. Louisville replaced Davis with pinch-runner Tanner Shiver, who was picked off attempting to steal second base. The next batter, Alex Alicea, hit the ball sharply to Arquette, who threw past the first baseman. An errant throw by Weber, who had gathered the ball, allowed Alicea to reach third. Kamau Neighbors hit a single that scored Alicea and tied the game. After Oregon State retired the side, Arquette began the Beavers’ rally with a single up the middle. The next batter, Turley, hit a double to the left field corner. Arquette dove for home plate just ahead of the throw to seal the victory.

Oregon State vs. Coastal Carolina (Game 6)

On June 15, Oregon State lost to Coastal Carolina 2–6. Coastal Carolina scored three runs in the top of the 1st inning. Easton Talt hit a solo home run in the 3rd to narrow Coastal Carolina's lead, but the Chanticleers added two more runs in the 4th and another run in the 5th to take a 6–1 lead. Gavin Turley's solo home run in the bottom of the 9th was the final score of the game. The loss put the Beavers in the loser's bracket and set up a rematch with Louisville.

Oregon State vs. Louisville (Game 9)

On June 17, Oregon State fell to Louisville in an elimination game rematch, 6–7. Louisville scored first with a run in the 1st inning, followed by two more in the 3rd. Oregon State scored two runs in the 4th off a Jacob Krieg home run, while Louisville scored a run of their own. Both teams traded runs in the 6th, but Louisville scored one more in the 7th to take a 6–3 lead into the 9th.

In the top half of the 9th inning, Aiva Arquette hit a solo home run. Gavin Turley singled, Wilson Weber was walked, and AJ Singer hit a single to load the bases. Tyce Peterson hit a ground ball, scoring two to tie the game. After retiring the Beavers, Louisville loaded the bases. A fly ball to center field allowed a run to score, ending the Beavers season.

== Roster ==
2025 Oregon State Beavers baseball team
Players
Coaches

#	Pos.	Name	B/T	Height	Weight	Year	Home town
1	OF	Gavin Turley	R/R	6 ft 1 in (1.85 m)	196 lb (89 kg)	Jr	Chandler, AZ
2	INF	Jabin Trosky (injured)	R/R	5 ft 11 in (1.8 m)	181 lb (82 kg)	RS Jr	Carmel, CA
3	INF	Cade Falsken	R/R	5 ft 8 in (1.73 m)	160 lb (73 kg)	Fr	Newbury Park, CA
4	OF	Dallas Macias	L/R	6 ft 0 in (1.83 m)	203 lb (92 kg)	Jr	Parker, CO
6	C	Easton Talt	L/R	5 ft 10 in (1.78 m)	178 lb (81 kg)	Jr	Everett, WA
7	INF	AJ Singer	R/R	5 ft 10 in (1.78 m)	170 lb (77 kg)	RS Jr	Glendale, AZ
8	INF	Levi Jones	L/R	6 ft 2 in (1.88 m)	192 lb (87 kg)	So	Portland, OR
9	OF	Carson McEntire	R/R	6 ft 1 in (1.85 m)	192 lb (87 kg)	RS Fr	Peoria, AZ
12	RHP	Chase Reynolds	R/R	6 ft 1 in (1.85 m)	211 lb (96 kg)	Sr	Albany, OR
13	INF	Aiva Arquette	R/R	6 ft 5 in (1.96 m)	220 lb (100 kg)	Jr	Kailua, HI
14	C	Bryce Hubbard	L/R	6 ft 0 in (1.83 m)	215 lb (98 kg)	Jr	Norcross, GA
15	C	Ryan VanderBrink	R/R	6 ft 1 in (1.85 m)	225 lb (102 kg)	Fr	West Linn, OR
16	RHP	Eric Segura	R/R	6 ft 2 in (1.88 m)	203 lb (92 kg)	So	Soledad, CA
17	INF	Adam Haight	R/R	6 ft 2 in (1.88 m)	192 lb (87 kg)	Fr	Snohomish, WA
18	C	Wilson Weber	R/R	6 ft 1 in (1.85 m)	222 lb (101 kg)	Sr	Gresham, OR
19	RHP	Wyatt Queen	R/R	6 ft 2 in (1.88 m)	200 lb (91 kg)	So	Marysville, WA
20	RHP	Kellan Oakes	R/R	6 ft 2 in (1.88 m)	201 lb (91 kg)	Jr	Canby, OR
21	RHP	James DeCremer	R/R	6 ft 1 in (1.85 m)	190 lb (86 kg)	RS Fr	Scottsdale, AZ
22	INF	Jacob Krieg	R/R	6 ft 5 in (1.96 m)	241 lb (109 kg)	Jr	Antioch, CA
23	OF	Canon Reeder	R/R	6 ft 0 in (1.83 m)	188 lb (85 kg)	Jr	Bend, OR
24	LHP	Ethan Kleinschmit	L/L	6 ft 3 in (1.91 m)	200 lb (91 kg)	So	Mount Angel, OR
25	RHP	Joey Mundt	R/R	6 ft 4 in (1.93 m)	224 lb (102 kg)	RS Sr	Hughson, CA
26	RHP	Noah Ferguson	R/R	5 ft 10 in (1.78 m)	188 lb (85 kg)	RS Sr	Salem, OR
27	RHP	Drew Talavs	R/R	6 ft 3 in (1.91 m)	202 lb (92 kg)	So	West Linn, OR
28	INF	Dawson Santana	R/R	5 ft 6 in (1.68 m)	151 lb (68 kg)	So	Lake Oswego, OR
29	RHP	Bryce Johnson	R/R	6 ft 3 in (1.91 m)	212 lb (96 kg)	RS Fr	Sammamish, WA
30	RHP	Dax Whitney	R/R	6 ft 5 in (1.96 m)	204 lb (93 kg)	Fr	Blackfoot, ID
31	RHP	Matthew Morrell (injured)	R/R	6 ft 3 in (1.91 m)	202 lb (92 kg)	So	Placentia, CA
32	RHP	AJ Hutcheson	L/R	5 ft 11 in (1.8 m)	187 lb (85 kg)	Jr	Elk Grove, CA
33	RHP	Laif Palmer	R/R	6 ft 6 in (1.98 m)	207 lb (94 kg)	So	Golden, CO
34	LHP	Max Fraser	L/L	6 ft 1 in (1.85 m)	185 lb (84 kg)	So	Camas, WA
35	RHP	Zach Kmatz	R/R	6 ft 3 in (1.91 m)	215 lb (98 kg)	Fr	Albuquerque, NM
36	LHP	Nelson Keljo	L/L	6 ft 4 in (1.93 m)	228 lb (103 kg)	Jr	Portland, OR
38	INF	Leo Cote (redshirt)	L/R	6 ft 2 in (1.88 m)	213 lb (97 kg)	RS Fr	Montreal, Quebec
40	INF	Paul Vazquez	R/R	6 ft 3 in (1.91 m)	208 lb (94 kg)	Fr	Covina, CA
43	C	Martin Serrano	L/R	6 ft 3 in (1.91 m)	205 lb (93 kg)	Fr	Pocatello, ID
44	INF	Trent Caraway	R/R	6 ft 2 in (1.88 m)	203 lb (92 kg)	So	Dana Point, CA
45	C	Kailand Halstead	R/R	5 ft 10 in (1.78 m)	205 lb (93 kg)	Fr	Puyallup, WA
48	LHP	Tanner Douglas	L/L	6 ft 2 in (1.88 m)	205 lb (93 kg)	Jr	Medford, OR
50	RHP	Zach Edwards	R/R	6 ft 2 in (1.88 m)	215 lb (98 kg)	Fr	Riverton, UT
54	INF	Tyce Peterson	R/R	5 ft 10 in (1.78 m)	197 lb (89 kg)	Jr	Kirkland, WA

Head coach

Mitch Canham

Assistant coach(es)

• Ryan Gipson
• Joey Wong
• Brady Kasper

Pitching coach(es)

Rich Dorman

Legend

- (C) Team captain
- (S) Suspended
- (I) Ineligible
- Injured
- Current redshirt

Roster
Last update: March 30, 2025

== Schedule and results ==
2025 Oregon State Beavers baseball game log (48–16–1)
Regular season (41–12–1)
February (6–2)

Date	Opponent	Rank	Site/stadium	Score	Win	Loss	Save	Record
Feb 14	vs. Xavier	No. 7	Surprise Stadium • Surprise, AZ	8–3	**Segura (1–0)**	Weber (0–1)	None	1–0
Feb 15	vs. UNLV	No. 7	Surprise Stadium • Surprise, AZ	16–0 ^{7}	**Whitney (1–0)**	Mercurius (0–1)	None	2–0
Feb 16	vs. Indiana	No. 7	Surprise Stadium • Surprise, AZ	6–0	**Kleinschmidt (1–0)**	Haas (0–1)	None	3–0
Feb 17	vs. Xavier	No. 7	Surprise Stadium • Surprise, AZ	18–6	**Talavs (1–0)**	Boyle (0–1)	None	4–0
Feb 19	vs. Houston	No. 7	Dell Diamond • Round Rock, TX	**CANCELED**				
Feb 21	vs. No. 2 Virginia	No. 7	Dell Diamond • Round Rock, TX	7–2	**Segura (2–0)**	Colucci (0–1)	None	5–0
Feb 22	vs. Oklahoma	No. 7	Dell Diamond • Round Rock, TX	4–8	Crossland (1–0)	**Whitney (1–1)**	None	5–1
Feb 23	vs. Minnesota	No. 7	Dell Diamond • Round Rock, TX	4–10	Sperry (1–0)	**Kleinschmit (1–1)**	None	5–2
Feb 28	vs. Baylor	No. 9	Globe Life Field • Arlington, TX	4–3	**Segura (3–0)**	Calder (2–1)	**Morrell (1)**	6–2

March (14–4)

Date	Opponent	Rank	Site/stadium	Score	Win	Loss	Save	Record
Mar 1	vs. Auburn	No. 9	Globe Life Field • Arlington, TX	7–8	Tilly (2–0)	**Whitney (1–2)**	Johnston (1)	6–3
Mar 2	vs. Ohio State	No. 9	Globe Life Field • Arlington, TX	12–10	**Mundt (1–0)**	Carrell (0–1)	**Morrell (2)**	7–3
Mar 7	vs. San Diego	No. 8	Goss Stadium at Coleman Field • Corvallis, OR	11–3	**Keljo (1–0)**	Scolari (1–2)	None	8–3
Mar 8	vs. San Diego	No. 8	Goss Stadium at Coleman Field • Corvallis, OR	2–0	**Morrell (1–0)**	Smith (0–2)	None	9–3
Mar 9	vs. San Diego	No. 8	Goss Stadium at Coleman Field • Corvallis, OR	5–2	**Kleinschmit (2–1)**	Mosiello (0–2)	**Palmer (1)**	10–3
Mar 11	vs. Washington State	No. 8	Goss Stadium at Coleman Field • Corvallis, OR	15–1	**Oakes (1–0)**	Hutzezon (0–2)	None	11–3
Mar 12	vs. Washington State	No. 8	Goss Stadium at Coleman Field • Corvallis, OR	4–3	**Queen (1–0)**	Lewis (1–2)	None	12–3
Mar 14	vs. Grand Canyon	No. 8	Goss Stadium at Coleman Field • Corvallis, OR	6–4	**Keljo (2–0)**	Lyon (1–2)	**Morrell (3)**	13–3
Mar 15	vs. Santa Clara	No. 8	Goss Stadium at Coleman Field • Corvallis, OR	8–0 ^{7}	**Whitney (2–2)**	Bayles (1–2)	None	14–3
Mar 16	vs. Grand Canyon	No. 8	Goss Stadium at Coleman Field • Corvallis, OR	3–1	**Kleinschmit (3–1)**	Key (0–3)	**Hutcheson (1)**	15–3
Mar 18	vs. Rutgers	No. 6	Goss Stadium at Coleman Field • Corvallis, OR	7–3	**Palmer (1–0)**	Falco (0–1)	None	16–3
Mar 21	at Cal Poly	No. 6	Robin Baggett Stadium • San Luis Obispo, CA	4–1	**Segura (4–0)**	Naess (2–2)	**Mundt (1)**	17–3
Mar 22	at Cal Poly	No. 6	Robin Baggett Stadium • San Luis Obispo, CA	6–7	Pearlman (1–0)	**Queen (1–1)**	None	17–4
Mar 23	at Cal Poly	No. 6	Robin Baggett Stadium • San Luis Obispo, CA	8–2	**Kleinschmit (4–1)**	Marmie (3–2)	None	18–4
Mar 25	vs Washington	No. 5	Ron Tonkin Field • Hillsboro, OR	5–2	**DeCremer (1–0)**	Brandenburg (0–4)	**Hutcheson (2)**	19–4
Mar 28	at Nebraska	No. 5	Hawks Field at Haymarket Park • Lincoln, NE	3–7	Walsh (3–4)	**Segura (4–1)**	Christo (1)	19–5
Mar 29	at Nebraska	No. 5	Hawks Field at Haymarket Park • Lincoln, NE	16–5 ^{7}	**Whitney (3–2)**	Horn (0–4)	None	20–5
Mar 30	at Nebraska	No. 5	Hawks Field at Haymarket Park • Lincoln, NE	7–16 ^{8}	Broderick (2–0)	**Mundt (1–1)**	None	20–6

April (12–5)

Date	Opponent	Rank	Site/stadium	Score	Win	Loss	Save	Record
Apr 4	vs. No. 12 UC Irvine	No. 11	Goss Stadium at Coleman Field • Corvallis, OR	0–12	Ojeda (6–0)	**Keljo (2–1)**	None	20–7
Apr 5	vs. No. 12 UC Irvine	No. 11	Goss Stadium at Coleman Field • Corvallis, OR	4–2	**Hutcheson (1–0)**	Butler (1–2)	None	21–7
Apr 6	vs. No. 12 UC Irvine	No. 11	Goss Stadium at Coleman Field • Corvallis, OR	7–4	**Kleinschmit (5–1)**	Brooks (3–2)	**Oakes (1)**	22–7
Apr 8	at Portland	No. 8	Ron Tonkin Field • Hillsboro, OR	10–6	**Queen (2–1)**	Anderson (1–1)	None	23–7
Apr 11	at Cal State Fullerton	No. 8	Goodwin Field • Fullerton, CA	7–3	**Segura (5–1)**	Meyer (3–1)	None	24–7
Apr 12	at Cal State Fullerton	No. 8	Goodwin Field • Fullerton, CA	17–10	**Edwards (1–0)**	Smith (1–2)	None	25–7
Apr 13	at Cal State Fullerton	No. 8	Goodwin Field • Fullerton, CA	9–8	**Kleinschmit (6–1)**	Krakoski (0–2)	None	26–7
Apr 15	at No. 10 UCLA	No. 6	Jackie Robinson Stadium • Los Angeles, CA	7–1	**DeCremer (2–0)**	May (5–2)	**Palmer (2)**	27–7
Apr 17	at CSUN	No. 6	Matador Field • Los Angeles, CA	13–8	**Segura (6–1)**	Mendes (2–3)	None	28–7
Apr 18	at CSUN	No. 6	Matador Field • Los Angeles, CA	16–11	**Hutcheson (2–0)**	Halamicek (2–4)	None	29–7
Apr 19	at CSUN	No. 6	Matador Field • Los Angeles, CA	15–12	**Kmatz (1–0)**	Gutierrez (2–4)	**Queen (1)**	30–7
Apr 21	vs. Gonzaga	No. 3	Goss Stadium at Coleman Field • Corvallis, OR	4–3 ^{12}	**Hutcheson (3–0)**	Francis (0–1)	None	31–7
Apr 22	vs. Gonzaga	No. 3	Goss Stadium at Coleman Field • Corvallis, OR	8–3	**Tanner (1–0)**	Cunneely (1–2)	None	32–7
Apr 25	at No. 13 Oregon	No. 3	PK Park • Eugene, OR	2–4	Grinsell (7–1)	**Keljo (2–2)**	Mattox (2)	32–8
Apr 26	at No. 13 Oregon	No. 3	PK Park • Eugene, OR	1–13	Clarke (3–2)	**Whitney (3–3)**	None	32–9
Apr 27	at No. 13 Oregon	No. 3	PK Park • Eugene, OR	2–3	Reitz (2–0)	**Kleinschmit (6–2)**	Garcia (2)	32–10
Apr 29	vs. No. 6 Oregon	No. 7	Goss Stadium at Coleman Field • Corvallis, OR	8–4	Jordan (1–0)	**Douglas (1–1)**	Mattox (3)	32–11

May (9–1–1)

Date	Opponent	Rank	Site/stadium	Score	Win	Loss	Save	Record
May 2	at Hawaii	No. 7	Les Murakami Stadium • Honolulu, HI	11–4	**Segura (7–1)**	Takemoto (2–5)	None	33–11
May 3	at Hawaii	No. 7	Les Murakami Stadium • Honolulu, HI	3–2	**Keljo (3–2)**	Rodriguez (4–1)	None	34–11
May 4	at Hawaii	No. 7	Les Murakami Stadium • Honolulu, HI	0–5	Walls (3–3)	**Kleinschmit (6–3)**	None	34–12
May 5	at Hawaii	No. 10	Les Murakami Stadium • Honolulu, HI	7–3	**Queen (3–1)**	Thomas (1–1)	None	35–12
May 7	vs. Portland	No. 10	Goss Stadium at Coleman Field • Corvallis, OR	**CANCELED**				
May 9	vs. Iowa	No. 10	Principal Park • Des Moines, IA	9–6	**Oakes (2–0)**	Watts (4–4)	None	36–12
May 10	vs. Iowa	No. 10	Principal Park • Des Moines, IA	5–1	**Whitney (4–3)**	Savary (7–1)	**Keljo (1)**	37–12
May 11	vs. Iowa	No. 10	Principal Park • Des Moines, IA	6–6 ^{10}	None	None	None	37–12–1
May 13	vs. Portland	No. 7	Goss Stadium at Coleman Field • Corvallis, OR	5–3	**Palmer (2–0)**	Starr (0–2)	None	38–12–1
May 15	vs. Long Beach State	No. 7	Goss Stadium at Coleman Field • Corvallis, OR	2–1	**Segura (8–1)**	Fields (0–2)	**Queen (2)**	39–12–1
May 16	vs. Long Beach State	No. 7	Goss Stadium at Coleman Field • Corvallis, OR	12–8	**Whitney (5–3)**	Montgomery (9–4)	None	40–12–1
May 17	vs. Long Beach State	No. 7	Goss Stadium at Coleman Field • Corvallis, OR	13–0 ^{7}	**Kleinschmit (7–3)**	Geiss (6–8)	None	41–12–1

Postseason (7–4)
Corvallis Regional (4–1)

Date	Opponent	Rank	Site/stadium	Score	Win	Loss	Save	Overall record	Regional record
May 30	vs. (4) Saint Mary's	No. 8 (1)	Goss Stadium at Coleman Field • Corvallis, OR	4–6	Delvecchio (7–3)	**Segura (8–2)**	Guevara Castro (3)	41–13–1	0–1
May 31	vs. (2) TCU	No. 8 (1)	Goss Stadium at Coleman Field • Corvallis, OR	7–2	**Whitney (6–3)**	Brassfield (5–2)	**Keljo (2)**	42–13–1	1–1
Jun 1	vs. (4) Saint Mary's	No. 8 (1)	Goss Stadium at Coleman Field • Corvallis, OR	20–3	**Kleinschmit (8–3)**	Sarantos (3–1)	None	43–13–1	2–1
Jun 1	vs. (3) USC	No. 8 (1)	Goss Stadium at Coleman Field • Corvallis, OR	14–1	**Oakes (3–0)**	Johnson (3–2)	**Kmatz (1)**	44–13–1	3–1
Jun 2	vs. (3) USC	No. 8 (1)	Goss Stadium at Coleman Field • Corvallis, OR	9–0	**DeCremer (3–0)**	Hunter (6–6)	None	45–13–1	4–1

Corvallis Super Regional (2–1)

Date	Opponent	Rank	Site/stadium	Score	Win	Loss	Save	Overall record	Super Regional record
Jun 6	vs. No. 9 Florida State	No. 8	Goss Stadium at Coleman Field • Corvallis, OR	5–4 ^{10}	**Oakes (4–0)**	Abraham (4–1)	None	46–13–1	1–0
Jun 7	vs. No. 9 Florida State	No. 8	Goss Stadium at Coleman Field • Corvallis, OR	1–3	Martinez (1–2)	**Kleinschmit (8–4)**	Prescott (3)	46–14–1	1–1
Jun 8	vs. No. 9 Florida State	No. 8	Goss Stadium at Coleman Field • Corvallis, OR	14–10	**Kmatz (2–0)**	Mendes (7–3)	None	47–14–1	2–1

College World Series (1–2)

Date	Opponent	Rank	Site/stadium	Score	Win	Loss	Save	Overall record	College World Series record
Jun 13	vs. Louisville	No. 8	Charles Schwab Field Omaha • Omaha, NE	4–3	**Oakes (5–0)**	Schweitzer (4–3)	None	48–14–1	1–0
Jun 15	vs. No. 13; Coastal Carolina	No. 8	Charles Schwab Field Omaha • Omaha, NE	2–6	Morrison (12–0)	**Kleinschmit (8–5)**	Lynch (9)	48–15–1	1–1
Jun 17	vs. Louisville	No. 8	Charles Schwab Field Omaha • Omaha, NE	7–6	Biven (5–0)	**Oakes (5–1)**	None	48–16–1	1–2

- Win
- Loss
- Postponement/Tie
- Bold: Oregon State team member
- Regular season rankings from D1 Baseball
- Postseason rankings based on NCAA Tournament National seeds
- (#) NCAA Regional Tournament seedings in parentheses.

== Corvallis Regional bracket ==
Corvallis Regional Teams
No. 8 (1) Oregon State Beavers	(2) TCU Horned Frogs	(3) USC Trojans	(4) Saint Mary's Gaels

- ◆ Ranking based on NCAA tournament seeding

First Round
1	Oregon State	4
4	Saint Mary's	6
2	TCU	1
3	USC	13
Lower round 1
1	Oregon State	7
2	TCU	2

Semi-Finals
4	Saint Mary's	4
3	USC	6
Lower final
1	Oregon State	20
4	Saint Mary's	3

Finals
3	USC	1	0
1	Oregon State	14	9

== Corvallis Super Regional bracket ==
Corvallis Super Regional Teams
No. 8 Oregon State Beavers	No. 9 Florida State Seminoles

- ◆ Ranking based on NCAA tournament seeding

Championship Series
Oregon State	5	1	14
Florida State	4	3	10

== Rankings ==
Ranking movements Legend: ██ Increase in ranking ██ Decrease in ranking
	Week																
Poll	Pre	1	2	3	4	5	6	7	8	9	10	11	12	13	14	15	Final
Coaches'	7	7*	10	10	11	8	8	11	9	6	3	12	11	10	7	9	4
Baseball America	9	9	11	13	11	11	9	12	10	9	6	16	15	11	11	11*	5
NCBWA†	7	6	8	9	9	10	8	9	6	6	3	3	9	10	8	7	4
D1Baseball	7	7	9	8	8	6	5	11	8	6	3	7	10	7	7	8	4
Perfect Game	10	9	13	13	10	9	9	13	7	7	4	10	11	9	8	8*	6

† NCBWA ranks 30 teams in their preseason poll, but only ranks 25 teams weekly during the season.
* A new poll was not released for this week, so for comparison purposes, the previous week's ranking is inserted in this week's slot.

== All-Americans ==
Six Oregon State players were selected All-Americans during the 2025 season, the most since 2018 when seven players were selected.

Key

ABCA	American Baseball Coaches Association
BA	Baseball America
CBF	College Baseball Foundation
D1	D1Baseball.com
NCBWA	National Collegiate Baseball Writers Association
PG	Perfect Game
	(#) Team selected, (F) Freshman team

Player	Position	Organization
Aiva Arquette	INF	BA (2), PG (2), D1 (3), NCBWA (3)
Ethan Kleinschmit	P	ABCA (3)
AJ Singer	INF	CBF (1)
Gavin Turley	OF	ABCA (1), CBF (1), BA (2), D1 (2), NCBWA (2)
Wilson Weber	C	ABCA (2)
Dax Whitney	P	D1 (3), BA (F), D1 (F), PG (F), NCBWA (F)

== Awards ==
Player	Position	Award
AJ Singer	2B	ABCA/Rawlings Gold Glove

Coach	Award
Mitch Canham	ABCA West Region Coach of the Year

== Major League Baseball draft ==
Seven Beavers were selected in the 2025 Major League Baseball draft.

Player	Position	Round	Overall	MLB team
Aiva Arquette	SS	1st	7th	Miami Marlins
Gavin Turley	OF	4th	110th	Athletics
Nelson Keljo	LHP	6th	192th	Cleveland Guardians
Kellan Oakes	RHP	9th	276th	Houston Astros
Wilson Weber	C	12th	348th	Miami Marlins
Dallas Macias	OF	15th	457th	Atlanta Braves
Canon Reeder	OF	18th	533rd	Pittsburgh Pirates
