= Jeff Mercer =

American baseball player and coach (born 1985)

Current position
- Title: Head coach
- Team: Indiana
- Conference: Big Ten
- Record: 230–180–1

Biographical details
- Born: July 29, 1985 (age 41); Bargersville, Indiana, U.S.
- Education: Wright State University

Playing career
- 2005–2007: Dayton
- 2008–2009: Wright State
- Position: First baseman

Coaching career (HC unless noted)
- 2011: Michigan (assistant)
- 2012–2013: Western Kentucky (assistant)
- 2014–2016: Wright State (assistant)
- 2017–2018: Wright State
- 2019–present: Indiana

Head coaching record
- Overall: 307–216–1
- Tournaments: Horizon: 5–2; Big Ten: 6–9; NCAA: 3–4

Accomplishments and honors

Championships
- Horizon (2018); Horizon tournament (2018); Big Ten (2019)

Awards
- 2× All-Horizon League (2008, 2009); Horizon League Player of the Year (2009); Horizon League Coach of the Year (2018); Big Ten Coach of the Year (2019)

Jeffery Daniel Mercer (born July 25, 1985) is an American college baseball coach and former first baseman. He is head baseball coach at Indiana University. He played college baseball at the University of Dayton from 2005 to 2007 before transferring to Wright State University to play in 2008 and 2009. In 2009, he was named the Horizon League Player of the Year. He was the head baseball coach at Wright State University from 2017 to 2018.

== Coaching career ==
On July 16, 2016, Mercer was named the head coach for the Wright State Raiders baseball team.

On July 2, 2018, Indiana University Athletics announced the hiring of Mercer, to the head coaching position for the Hoosiers.

On May 21, 2019, Mercer was named Big Ten Coach of the Year, following his first year as coach of the Indiana Hoosiers.

== Head coaching record ==
Record table
Season	Team	Overall	Conference	Standing	Postseason
Wright State Raiders (Horizon League) (2017–2018)
2017	Wright State	38–21	21–9	2nd	Horizon League tournament
2018	Wright State	39–15	22–6	1st	NCAA Regional
Wright State:		77–36	43–15		
Indiana Hoosiers (Big Ten Conference) (2019–present)
2019	Indiana	37–23	17–7	1st	NCAA Regional
2020	Indiana	9–6	0–0		Season canceled due to COVID-19
2021	Indiana	26–18	26–18	4th	
2022	Indiana	27–32	10–14	T-8th	Big Ten tournament
2023	Indiana	43–20	16–8	2nd	NCAA Regional
2024	Indiana	33–26–1	15–9	3rd	NCAA Regional
2025	Indiana	32–24	16–14	6th	Big Ten tournament
2026	Indiana	23–31	9–21	T–13th	
Indiana:		230–180–1 (.561)	109–91 (.545)		
Total:		307–216–1 (.587)			
National champion Postseason invitational champion Conference regular season champion Conference regular season and conference tournament champion Division regular season champion Division regular season and conference tournament champion Conference tournament champion

== See also ==
- List of current NCAA Division I baseball coaches
