= Mulivai Levu =

American baseball player (born 2004)

Cincinnati Reds
- First baseman
- Born: August 10, 2004 (age 22); Irvine, California, U.S.
- Bats: Left Throws: Right

Mulivai Lui Levu (born August 10, 2004) is an American professional baseball first baseman in the Cincinnati Reds organization. He played college baseball for the UCLA Bruins.

== Amateur career ==
Levu attended Ocean View High School in Huntington Beach, California. In December 2022, during his senior year, he initially committed to Long Beach State before switching his commitment to UCLA.

As a freshman in 2024, Levu played both as a first baseman (opening day) and a third baseman for the Bruins. He hit .291/.355/.455 with 6 home runs in 46 games (43 starts). Levu played collegiate summer baseball with the Green Bay Rockers of the Northwoods League after the spring season.

He returned to UCLA as a sophomore, improving to hit .320/.389/.522 with 12 home runs and 85 RBIs in 66 games in which all were starts. He won the ABCA/Rawlings Gold Glove award with only one error in the season and was also named third-team All American by Baseball America, helping the Bruins reach the 2025 College World Series. In July 2025, he played for the USA Collegiate National Baseball team.

In 2026, Levu built off of his sophomore year, hitting .340/.441/.622 with 18 home runs and 63 RBIs in 59 games. He became the first UCLA player his second straight ABCA/Rawlings Gold Glove award, helping them win the 2026 Big Ten baseball tournament.

Levu was considered a top prospect for the 2026 Major League Baseball draft.

== Professional career ==
Levu was drafted in Competitive Balance Round B of the 2026 draft by the Cincinnati Reds and signed for $1.1 million.

On August 11, 2026, Levu made his professional debut for the Daytona Tortugas and hit his first professional home run for his first hit.

== Personal life ==
Levu is Samoan and does Siva Afi (fire knifing). Levu is cousins with Blake Sabol, a catcher in the Tampa Bay Rays organization.
