= 2025 Michigan State Spartans baseball team =

College baseball team season

2025 Michigan State Spartans baseball
- Conference: Big Ten Conference
- Record: 28–27 (13–17 Big Ten)
- Head coach: Jake Boss (17th season)
- Assistant coaches: Graham Sikes (16th season); Andrew Stone (4th season)
- Pitching coach: Mark Van Ameyde (8th season)
- Home stadium: Drayton McLane Baseball Stadium at John H. Kobs Field

2025 Big Ten Conference baseball standings
	Conf.						Overall
Team	W		L		T	PCT	W		L		T	PCT
No. 5 Oregon ‍†‍‍^{y}	22	–	8	–	0	.733	42	–	16	–	0	.724
No. 13 UCLA ‍†‍‍^{y}	22	–	8	–	0	.733	48	–	16	–	0	.750
Iowa ‍‍‍	21	–	9	–	0	.700	33	–	22	–	1	.598
USC ‍‍‍^{y}	18	–	12	–	0	.600	37	–	23	–	0	.617
Washington ‍‍‍	17	–	13	–	0	.567	29	–	28	–	0	.509
Indiana ‍‍‍	16	–	14	–	0	.533	32	–	24	–	0	.571
Michigan ‍‍‍	16	–	14	–	0	.533	33	–	23	–	0	.589
Nebraska ‍‍‡‍^{y}	15	–	15	–	0	.500	33	–	29	–	0	.532
Penn State ‍‍‍	15	–	15	–	0	.500	33	–	23	–	0	.589
Rutgers ‍‍‍	15	–	15	–	0	.500	29	–	28	–	0	.509
Illinois ‍‍‍	14	–	16	–	0	.467	30	–	24	–	0	.556
Michigan State ‍‍‍	13	–	17	–	0	.433	28	–	27	–	0	.509
Northwestern ‍‍‍	13	–	17	–	0	.433	25	–	27	–	0	.481
Maryland ‍‍‍	12	–	18	–	0	.400	27	–	29	–	0	.482
Purdue ‍‍‍	11	–	19	–	0	.367	31	–	23	–	0	.574
Minnesota ‍‍‍	10	–	20	–	0	.333	24	–	28	–	0	.462
Ohio State ‍‍‍	5	–	25	–	0	.167	13	–	37	–	0	.260
† – Conference champion ‡ – Tournament champion y – Invited to the NCAA tournament As of June 2, 2025; Rankings from D1Baseball

The 2025 Michigan State Spartans baseball team represented Michigan State University in the 2025 NCAA Division I baseball season. The Spartans were led by head coach Jake Boss in his seventeenth season. The Spartans were members of the Big Ten Conference and played their home games at Jeff Ishbia Field at McLane Stadium in East Lansing, Michigan.

== Previous season ==
The Spartans finished the 2024 season 24–27, including 11–13 in conference play, finishing in tenth place in their conference. They failed to make the BIG 10 Tournament and did not receive a bid to the NCAA Tournament.

== 2025 season start ==
The Spartans began their season in Cary, North Carolina, at the USA Baseball National Training Complex. They defeated Western Michigan twice to open their season in a 7-inning double header on February 14th. Spartan ace Joseph Dzierwa threw incredibly well, going 6 innings, allowing 0 runs, and striking out 11. The Spartans went on to play Monmouth University in a doubleheader on February 15. Taking both games and beginning their season 4-0.

== Roster ==
2024 Michigan State Baseball Roster
Pitchers: 6 – Garrett Brewer – Sophomore; 7 – Jaxon Huffman – Sophomore; 11 – Tate Farquhar – (redshirt) Sophomore; 14 – Tommy Szczepanski – Junior; 15 – Gannon Grundman – Sophomore; 16 – Joseph Dzierwa – Junior; 20 – Josh Klug – Sophomore; 22 – Gavin Moczydlowsky – Sophomore; 26 – Dominic Pianto – (redshirt) Senior; 28 – Aidan Donovan – Freshman; 29 – Noah Matheny – (redshirt) Junior; 32 – Zach Maxey – Graduate; 38 – Tyler Horvath – Graduate; 39 – Gavin Sitarz – Junior; 41 – Nolan Higgins – Junior; 42 – Ryan "Four-Two" Szczepaniak – (redshirt) Junior; 44 – Ryan Zimmer – Graduate; 47 – George Viebrock III – Graduate; 55 – Brady Chambers – Freshman	Catchers: 5 – Christian Williams – (redshirt) Senior; 18 – Noah Bright – Senior; 19 – Adam Broski – Sophomore; 31 – Caleb Berry – Graduate; 53 – Atticus Huffstutler – Freshman; First basemen: 29 – Sam Busch – (redshirt) Senior; 50 – Will Shannon – Senior; 8 – Isaac Sturgess – Freshman; Infielders: 1 – Ryan McKay – Sophomore; 3 – Dayton Murphy – Freshman; 9 – Jacob Anderson – (redshirt) Junior; 25 – Reggie Sharpe – Freshman; 35 – Randy Seymour – Junior	Outfielders: 2 – JT Sokolove – Senior; 10 – Nick Williams – Senior; 13 – Parker Picot – Sophomore; 21 – Khamaree Thomas – Freshman; 30 – Jake Dresselhouse – Junior; 43 – Griffin Brown – Junior

=== Coaching staff ===
2025 Michigan State Baseball Coaching Staff
Name	Position	Seasons at Michigan State
Jake Boss	Head coach	17
Graham Sikes	Recruiting Coordinator	16
Mark Van Ameyde	Pitching Coach	8
Andrew Stone	Hitting Coach and Recruiting Coordinator	4
Adam Eaton	Director of Player Development	3
Tommy Merlo	Director of Baseball Operations	2

=== Student Manager staff ===
2025 Michigan State Baseball Student Managers
Name	Year	Seasons at Michigan State
Griffin Novak	Senior	3
Garrett Hearl	Senior	3
Frank Lollo	Junior	3
Elan Wasserman	Junior	3
Jack Novick	Senior	2
Jake Bernstein	Senior	2
Beau Belkowski	Senior	2
Tyler Wolters	Sophomore	2
Murphy Wegner	Junior	1
Marcelo Rodriguez	Freshman	1
Jett Weeder	Freshman	1

== Schedule and results ==
2025 Michigan State baseball game log (28–26)
Legend: = Win = Loss = Canceled Bold = MSU Baseball team member * = Non-Conference Game
Regular season (28–26)

February (7–1)
Date Time	Opponent	Rank	Site/stadium	Score	Win	Loss	Save	TV	Attendance	Overall record	Big Ten record
February 14; 4:00 p.m.	vs. Western Michigan*		USA Baseball National Training Complex; Cary, NC	2–0 (7)	**Dzierwa** (1–0)	Mckinstry (0–1)	**Pikur** (1)	USABaseball.TV		1–0	–
February 14; 6:10 p.m.	vs. Western Michigan*		USA Baseball National Training Complex; Cary, NC	6–3	**Maxey** (1–0)	Shapiro (0–1)	**Horvath** (1)	USABaseball.TV	214	2–0	–
February 15; 9:30 a.m.	vs. Monmouth*		USA Baseball National Training Complex; Cary, NC	2–0 (7)	**Higgins** (1–0)	Greeley (0–1)	**Pikur** (2)	USABaseball.TV	100	3–0	–
February 15; 2:53 p.m.	vs. Monmouth*		USA Baseball National Training Complex; Cary, NC	4–1	**Szczepanski** (1–0)	Tamburro (0–1)	**Horvath** (2)	USABaseball.TV	125	4–0	–
February 16, 1:00 p.m.	vs. Dayton*		USA Baseball National Training Complex; Cary, NC	Cancelled							
February 21; 1:00 p.m.	vs. Washington State*; Kleberg Bank Classic		Whataburger Field; Corpus Christi, Texas	9–2	**Dzierwa** (2–0)	Smith (0–1)	—	FloSports	50	5–0	–
February 22; 7:35 p.m.	at. Texas A&M–Corpus Christi*; Kleberg Bank Classic		Whataburger Field; Corpus Christi, Texas	8–3	**Maxey** (2–0)	Singleton (0–2)	—	FloSports	674	6–0	–
February 23; 10:30 a.m.	vs. UCLA; Kleberg Bank Classic		Whataburger Field; Corpus Christi, Texas	9–15	Barnett (2–0)	**Horvath** (0–1)	—	FloSports	50	6–1	–
February 28; 6:00 p.m.	vs. Harvard*		Fluor Field; Greenville, SC	14–1 (7)	**Dzierwa** (3–0)	Begsma (0–2)	—	ESPN+	516	7–1	–

March (10–9)
Date	Opponent	Rank	Site/stadium	Score	Win	Loss	Save	TV	Attendance	Overall record	Big Ten record
March 1; 6:00 p.m.	vs. Harvard*		Fluor Field; Greenville, SC	11–1 (7)	**Maxey** (3–0)	Pauley (0–2)	—	ESPN+	509	8–1	–
March 2; 12:00 p.m.	vs. Harvard*		Fluor Field; Greenville, SC	13–3 (7)	**Horvath** (1–1)	Colasante (0–1)	—	ESPN+	302	9–1	–
March 5; 6:30 p.m.	vs Western Carolina*		Fluor Field; Greenville, SC	7–10	Langley (1–0)	**Pikur** (0–1)	—	ESPN+	1,805	9–2	–
March 7; 10:00 a.m.	vs Cornell*; First Pitch Invitational		Fluor Field; Greenville, SC	3–2	**Horvath** (2–1)	William (0–1)	—	ESPN+	235	10–2	–
March 7; 2:00 p.m.	vs UAB*; First Pitch Invitational		Fluor Field; Greenville, SC	5–2	**Dzierwa** (4–0)	Cheatham (2–2)	—	ESPN+	423	11–2	–
March 8; 4:50 p.m.	vs Winthrop*; First Pitch Invitational		Fluor Field; Greenville, SC	7–0	**Grundman** (1–0)	Sarna (1–2)	**Pianto** (1)	ESPN+	268	12–2	–
March 9; 12:00 p.m.	vs UAB*; First Pitch Invitational		Fluor Field; Greenville, SC	7–12	Hicks (1–0)	**Donovan** (0–1)	—	ESPN+	526	12–3	–
March 12; 4:05 p.m.	vs Michigan		Jeff Ishbia Field at McLane Stadium; East Lansing, Michigan	7–11	Kasner (2–0)	**Grundman** (1–1)	—	B1G+	1,487	12–4	–
March 14; 1:02 p.m.	at Iowa		Duane Banks Field; Iowa City, Iowa	12–8 (11)	**Horvath** (3–1)	Anthony (1–2)	—	B1G+		13–4	1–0
March 14; 5:02 p.m.	at Iowa		Duane Banks Field; Iowa City, Iowa	3–7	Savary (4–0)	**Higgins** (1–1)	Detaeye (1)	B1G+	1,057	13–5	1–1
March 15; 2:02 p.m.	at Iowa		Duane Banks Field; Iowa City, Iowa	0–10 (7)	Reece (3–0)	**Donovan** (0–2)	—	B1G+	878	13–6	1–2
March 19; 4:02 p.m.	vs Oakland*		Jeff Ishbia Field at McLane Stadium; East Lansing, Michigan	8–5	**Farquhar** (1–0)	Glassman (0–3)	**Horvath** (1)	B1G+	850	14–6	–
March 21; 5:32 p.m.	at Penn State		Medlar Field at Lubrano Park; State College, Pennsylvania	4–0	**Dzierwa** (5–0)	Desanto (4–1)	**Horvath** (1)	B1G+	1,650	15–6	2–2
March 22; 2:02 p.m.	at Penn State		Medlar Field at Lubrano Park; State College, Pennsylvania	5–11	Horwat (4–1)	**Brewer** (0–1)	Steele (1)	B1G+	1,309	15–7	2–3
March 23; 1:02 p.m.	at Penn State		Medlar Field at Lubrano Park; State College, Pennsylvania	10–5	**Pikur** (1–1)	Olson (0–1)	**Horvath** (5)	B1G+	1,091	16–7	3–3
March 26; 4:30 p.m.	at Notre Dame*		Frank Eck Stadium; South Bend, Indiana	6–9	Klosterman (1–0)	**Szczepaniak** (0–1)	Mcdonough (1)	ACCN	482	16–8	–
March 28; 1:30 p.m.	vs Illinois		Jeff Ishbia Field at McLane Stadium; East Lansing, Michigan	6–9	Girard (1–0)	**Pikur** (1–2)	Bates (1)	B1G+		16–9	3–4
March 28; 4:00 p.m.	vs Illinois		Jeff Ishbia Field at McLane Stadium; East Lansing, Michigan	3–10	Plumley (2–2)	**Higgins** (1–2)	—	B1G+	714	16–10	3–5
March 30; 12:02 p.m.	vs Illinois		Jeff Ishbia Field at McLane Stadium; East Lansing, Michigan	14–4 (8)	**Farquhar** (2–0)	Hall (2–2)	—	B1G+	824	17–10	4–5

April (6–9)
Date	Opponent	Rank	Site/stadium	Score	Win	Loss	Save	TV	Attendance	Overall record	Big Ten record
April 2	vs Bowling Green*		Jeff Ishbia Field at McLane Stadium; East Lansing, Michigan	Cancelled							
April 6; 1:02 p.m.	at Indiana		Bart Kaufman Field; Bloomington, Indiana	4–6	Seebold (2–3)	**Dzierwa** (5–1)	Vogel (1)	B1G+	1,211	17–11	4–6
April 7; 12:02 p.m.	at Indiana		Bart Kaufman Field; Bloomington, Indiana	2–14 (7)	Gilley (6–1)	**Higgins** (1–3)	—	B1G+	973	17–12	4–7
April 7; 3:02 p.m.	at Indiana		Bart Kaufman Field; Bloomington, Indiana	2–18 (7)	Holderfield (2–0)	**Grundman** (1–2)	Decker-petty (1)	B1G+	1,247	17–13	4–8
April 9; 3:00 p.m.	vs Central Michigan*		Jeff Ishbia Field at McLane Stadium; East Lansing, Michigan	5–6	Ross (1–2)	**Brewer** (0–2)	Stumpf (1)	B1G+	311	17–14	–
April 11; 5:32 p.m.	vs Northwestern		Jeff Ishbia Field at McLane Stadium; East Lansing, Michigan	10–11 (11)	Crawford (3–4)	**Horvath** (3–2)	—	BTN	567	17–15	4–9
April 12; 3:32 p.m.	vs Northwestern		Jeff Ishbia Field at McLane Stadium; East Lansing, Michigan	10–0 (8)	**Dzierwa** (6–1)	Forniss (1–1)	—	B1G+	1,324	18–15	5–9
April 13; 1:02 p.m.	vs Northwestern		Jeff Ishbia Field at McLane Stadium; East Lansing, Michigan	3–1	**Higgins** (2–3)	Kouser (3–3)	**Brewer** (1)	B1G+	602	19–15	6–9
April 15; 6:02 p.m.	vs Western Michigan*		Jeff Ishbia Field at McLane Stadium; East Lansing, Michigan	14–4 (8)	**Donovan** (1–2)	Lehmann (1–3)	—	B1G+	442	20–15	–
April 18; 6:02 p.m.	vs Ohio State		Jeff Ishbia Field at McLane Stadium; East Lansing, Michigan	11–4	**Viebrock III** (1–0)	Erdmann (0–5)	**Horvath** (6)	B1G+	1,331	21–15	7–9
April 19; 3:32 p.m.	vs Ohio State		Jeff Ishbia Field at McLane Stadium; East Lansing, Michigan	10–9 (11)	**Brewer** (1–2)	Shaw (2–4)	—	B1G+	1,262	22–15	8–9
April 20; 1:02 p.m.	vs Ohio State		Jeff Ishbia Field at McLane Stadium; East Lansing, Michigan	14–4 (7)	**Higgins** (3–3)	Michalak (1–4)	—	B1G+	678	23–15	9–9
April 22; 6:02 p.m.	vs Purdue Fort Wayne*		Jeff Ishbia Field at McLane Stadium; East Lansing, Michigan	1–10	Newell (1–3)	**Donovan** (1–3)	—	B1G+	654	23–16	–
April 25; 6:00 p.m.	at Michigan		Ray Fisher Stadium; Ann Arbor, Michigan	2–8	Barr (5–3)	**Farquhar** (2–1)	—	B1G+	1,663	23–17	9–10
April 26; 2:00 p.m.	at Michigan		Ray Fisher Stadium; Ann Arbor, Michigan	2–9	Lally Jr. (4–3)	**Dzierwa** (6–2)	—	B1G+	1,884	23–18	9–11
April 27; 1:00 p.m.	at Michigan		Ray Fisher Stadium; Ann Arbor, Michigan	5–6	Carey (7–0)	**Higgins** (3–4)	Rogers (7)	B1G+	2,226	23–19	9–12

May (5–6)
Date	Opponent	Rank	Site/stadium	Score	Win	Loss	Save	TV	Attendance	Overall record	Big Ten record
May 2; 6:00 p.m.	vs No. 6 Oregon		Jeff Ishbia Field at McLane Stadium; East Lansing, Michigan	2–0	**Dzierwa** (7–2)	Grinsell (7–2)	—	B1G+	1,016	24–19	10–12
May 3; 3:30 p.m.	vs No. 6 Oregon		Jeff Ishbia Field at McLane Stadium; East Lansing, Michigan	5–13	Clarke (4–2)	**Farquhar** (2–2)	Umlandt (1)	B1G+	852	24–20	10–13
May 4; 11:30 a.m.	vs No. 6 Oregon		Jeff Ishbia Field at McLane Stadium; East Lansing, Michigan	1–3	Reitz (3–0)	**Higgins** (3–5)	Mattox (1)	B1G+	562	24–21	10–14
May 6; 6:00 p.m.	vs Eastern Michigan*		Jeff Ishbia Field at McLane Stadium; East Lansing, Michigan	3–1	**Donovan** (2–3)	Gillies (0–1)	**Pianto** (2)	B1G+	725	25–21	–
May 7; 4:05 p.m.	at Western Michigan*		Hyames Field; Kalamazoo, Michigan	5–6 (12)	Maloney (1–0)	**Moczydlowsky** (0–1)	—	YouTube	328	25–22	–
May 9; 9:30 p.m.	at No. 25 USC		OC Great Park Baseball Complex; Irvine, California	5–0	**Dzierwa** (8–2)	Hunter (6–4)	—	B1G+	789	26–22	11–14
May 10; 5:00 p.m.	at No. 25 USC		OC Great Park Baseball Complex; Irvine, California	15–5 (8)	**Farquhar** (3–2)	Aoki (5–3)	—	B1G+	503	27–22	12–14
May 11; 4:00 p.m.	at No. 25 USC		OC Great Park Baseball Complex; Irvine, California	3–10	Edwards (2–0)	**Higgins** (3–6)	—	B1G+	703	27–23	12–15
May 15; 6:00 p.m.	vs Minnesota		Jeff Ishbia Field at McLane Stadium; East Lansing, Michigan	3–4	Sundquiat (3–1)	**Dzierwa** (8–3)	Clausen (1)	B1G+	535	27–24	12–16
May 16; 6:00 p.m.	vs Minnesota		Jeff Ishbia Field at McLane Stadium; East Lansing, Michigan	5–11	Remington (2–6)	**Farquhar** (3–3)	Rooney (1)	B1G+	805	27–25	12–17
May 17; 1:00 p.m.	vs Minnesota		Jeff Ishbia Field at McLane Stadium; East Lansing, Michigan	11–10	**Brewer** (2–2)	Clausen (0–2)	—	B1G+	805	28–25	13–17

Postseason (0–2)

Big Ten Tournament (0–2)
Date	Opponent	Rank	Site/stadium	Score	Win	Loss	Save	TV	Attendance	Overall record	B1GT Record
May 20; 6:23 p.m.	vs (8) Nebraska; Pool A	(12)	Charles Schwab Field; Omaha, Nebraska	4–5 (10)	Broderick (4–2)	**Pianto** (0–1)	—	BTN	2,843	28–26	0–1
May 22; 5:11 p.m.	vs (1) Oregon; Pool A	(12)	Charles Schwab Field; Omaha, Nebraska	2–4	Garcia (3–0)	**Horvath** (3–3)	Mattox (1)	BTN		28–27	0–2

*Denotes non–conference game • source • Rankings based on the teams' current ranking in the D1 Baseball Poll • Game is in EST •. |}
