= 2025 USC Trojans baseball team =

2025 season of the University of Southern California baseball team

2025 USC Trojans baseball

Corvallis Regional, 2–2
- Conference: Big Ten Conference
- Record: 37–23 (18–12 Big Ten)
- Head coach: Andy Stankiewicz (3rd season)
- Assistant coaches: Andy Jenkins (3rd season); Seth Etherton (3rd season); Travis Jewett (3rd season)
- Home stadium: OC Great Park Baseball Complex; George C. Page Stadium

2025 Big Ten Conference baseball standings
	Conf.						Overall
Team	W		L		T	PCT	W		L		T	PCT
No. 5 Oregon ‍†‍‍^{y}	22	–	8	–	0	.733	42	–	16	–	0	.724
No. 13 UCLA ‍†‍‍^{y}	22	–	8	–	0	.733	48	–	16	–	0	.750
Iowa ‍‍‍	21	–	9	–	0	.700	33	–	22	–	1	.598
USC ‍‍‍^{y}	18	–	12	–	0	.600	37	–	23	–	0	.617
Washington ‍‍‍	17	–	13	–	0	.567	29	–	28	–	0	.509
Indiana ‍‍‍	16	–	14	–	0	.533	32	–	24	–	0	.571
Michigan ‍‍‍	16	–	14	–	0	.533	33	–	23	–	0	.589
Nebraska ‍‍‡‍^{y}	15	–	15	–	0	.500	33	–	29	–	0	.532
Penn State ‍‍‍	15	–	15	–	0	.500	33	–	23	–	0	.589
Rutgers ‍‍‍	15	–	15	–	0	.500	29	–	28	–	0	.509
Illinois ‍‍‍	14	–	16	–	0	.467	30	–	24	–	0	.556
Michigan State ‍‍‍	13	–	17	–	0	.433	28	–	27	–	0	.509
Northwestern ‍‍‍	13	–	17	–	0	.433	25	–	27	–	0	.481
Maryland ‍‍‍	12	–	18	–	0	.400	27	–	29	–	0	.482
Purdue ‍‍‍	11	–	19	–	0	.367	31	–	23	–	0	.574
Minnesota ‍‍‍	10	–	20	–	0	.333	24	–	28	–	0	.462
Ohio State ‍‍‍	5	–	25	–	0	.167	13	–	37	–	0	.260
† – Conference champion ‡ – Tournament champion y – Invited to the NCAA tournament As of June 2, 2025; Rankings from D1Baseball

The 2025 USC Trojans baseball team will represent the University of Southern California (USC) during the 2025 NCAA Division I baseball season. Due to Dedeaux Field being renovated the Trojans played their home games OC Great Park Baseball Complex, and Page Stadium in Los Angeles. The team will be coached by Andy Stankiewicz in his 3rd season at USC.

== Previous season ==
The Trojans ended the 2024 season with a record of 17–12 in conference play and 31–28 overall record, good for 4th place in the Pac-12. They would play in the Pac-12 tournament as the #4 Seed on Pool C in Game 1 they would beat Utah and then in Game 2 would beat Oregon they would play in the Semifinals beating #6 seed California and then they would play in the Championship Game against #1 seed Arizona but would lose to Arizona and would end their season after not being accepted into the 2024 NCAA Division I baseball tournament.

=== 2024 MLB draft ===
The Trojans had five players drafted in the 2024 MLB draft. Italics = did not sign.

Player	Position	Round	Overall	MLB Team
Austin Overn	OF	3rd	97	Baltimore Orioles
Will Watson	P	7th	203	New York Mets
Josh Blum	P	16th	473	New York Mets
Ryan Jackson	SS	17th	510	San Diego Padres
Bryce Martin-Grudzielanek	SS	20th	607	Toronto Blue Jays

== Roster ==
2025 USC Trojans roster
Pitchers: 11 - Michael Ebner - Junior; 12 - Saden Aoki - Senior; 22 - Caden Hunter - Junior; 25 - Fisher Johnson - Senior; 28 - Garren Rizzo - Sophomore; 30 - Mason Edwards - Sophomore; 31 - Sax Matson - Sophomore; 35 - Andrew Harbour - Sophomore; 36 - Iee Southisene - Freshman; 37 - Jackson Baker - Sophomore; 39 - Brodie Purcell - Sophomore; 40 - Andrew Johnson - Freshman; 41 - Ben Cushnie - Freshman; 44 - Jude Favela - Freshman; 45 - Adrian Boles - Freshman; 55 - Grant Govel - Freshman	Catchers: 24 - Augie Lopez - Freshman; 32 - Richard Tejeda - Junior; Infielders: 5 - Adrian Lopez - Sophomore; 6 - Dean Carpentier - Sophomore; 7 - Abbrie Covarrubias - Sophomore; 9 - Maddox Riske - Freshman; 15 - Ethan Hedges - Junior; 20 - Anthony Perritano - Freshman; 27 - Bryce Martin-Grudzielanek - (redshirt) Junior	Outfielders: 4 - Wes Hickey - Freshman; 14 - Jack Basseer - Junior; 16 - Brayden Dowd - Sophomore; 18 - Kade Higgins - Graduate; 26 - Ryder Dykstra - Freshman; 34 - Matthew Priest - Freshman	Two Way Players: 8 - Kevin Takeuchi - Sophomore; 10 - Maximo Martinez - Freshman; 13 - Will Stickney - Freshman; 23 - Joshua Hanson - Freshman; 29 - Andrew Lamb - Sophomore; 33 - John Elliott - Freshman; 48 - Zach Schwartzberg - Junior; 77 - Dylan Osborne - Sophomore

=== Coaches ===
2024 USC Trojans baseball coaching staff
- Andy Stankiewicz – Head coach – 3rd season
- Travis Jewett – Assistant coach – 3rd season
- Seth Etherton – Assistant coach – 3rd season
- Andy Jenkins – Assistant coach – 3rd season

Note: Season counter accounts for all stints at USC.

== Personnel ==
=== Starters ===
Opening Night Lineup
Pos.	No.	Player.	Year
LF	8	Kevin Takeuchi	Sophomore
CF	16	Brayden Dowd	Sophomore
SS	27	Bryce Martin-Grudzielanek	Junior
DH	5	Adrian Lopez	Sophomore
1B	6	Dean Carpenter	Sophomore
RF	18	Kade Higgins	Graduate
3B	15	Ethan Hedges	Junior
C	32	Richard Tejeda	Junior
2B	7	Abbrie Covarrubias	Sophomore

Weekend pitching rotation
Day	No.	Player.	Year
Friday	22	Caden Hunter	Junior
Saturday	12	Caden Aoki	Senior
Sunday	37	Jackson Baker	Sophomore

== Schedule and results ==
2025 USC Trojans baseball game log (Overall: 34–20; Conference: 18–12); (Home: 17–11; Away: 17–9)
Regular season (34-20)
February (8–1)
(Home; 5–0; Away: 3–1)

Date Time	Opponent	Rank	TV	Venue	Score	Win	Loss	Save	Attendance	Overall record	B1G record
February 14; 6:30 p.m.	vs George Washington*		BTN+	OC Great Park Baseball Complex • Irvine, California	**W 15-2**	**Andrew Johnson (1-0)**	Michael Foltz Jr. (0-1)	None	1,086	1-0	--
February 15; 2:00 p.m.	vs George Washington*		BTN+	OC Great Park Baseball Complex • Irvine, California	**W 9-8**	**Mason Edwards (1-0)**	Teddy Brennan (0-1)	**Ethan Hedges (1)**	1,053	2-0	--
February 16; 1:00 p.m.	vs George Washington*		BTN+	OC Great Park Baseball Complex • Irvine, California	**W 7-5**	**Garren Rizzo (1-0)**	Wywoda Declan (0-1)	**Ethan Hedges (2)**	1,018	3-0	--
February 18; 6:00 p.m.	at UC Irvine*		ESPN+	Anteater Ballpark • Irvine, California	**W 5-2**	**Grant Govel (1-0)**	Ryder Brooks (0-1)	None	1,239	4-0	--
February 19; 6:00 p.m.	vs Cal State Bakersfield*		BTN+	Page Stadium • Los Angeles, California	**W 7-0**	**Garren Rizzo (2-0)**	Jacob Gutierrez (0-1)	None	489	5-0	--
February 21; 4:30 p.m.	at Rice*		ESPN+	Reckling Park • Houston, Texas	**W 7-5**(11)	**Garren Rizzo (3-0)**	Gallant Reed (0-1)	**Dylan Osborne (1)**	1,801	6-0	--
February 22; 12:00 p.m.	at Rice*		ESPN+	Reckling Park • Houston, Texas	Canceled (Inclement Weather)						--
February 23; 11:00 a.m.	at Rice*		ESPN+	Reckling Park • Houston, Texas	**L 3–4**	Garrett Stratton (1-0)	**Brodie Purcell (0-1)**	None	1,585	6–1	--
February 25; 6:00 p.m.	at Cal State Fullerton*		ESPN+	Goodwin Field • Fullerton, California	**W 5-3**	**Garren Rizzo (4-0)**	Dylan Smith (0-1)	**Ethan Hedges (3)**	1,556	7-1	--
Southern California College Baseball Classic
February 28; 6:00 p.m.	vs UConn*		BTN+	OC Great Park Baseball Complex • Irvine, California	**W 8-5**	**Caden Hunter (2-0)**	Caden Suchy (0-1)	**Grant Govel (1)**	879	8-1	--

March (8–9)
(Home; 2–3; Away: 4–5; Neutral: 2–1)

Date Time	Opponent	Rank	TV	Venue	Score	Win	Loss	Save	Attendance	Overall record	B1G record
March 1; 2:00 p.m.	vs No. 14 Vanderbilt*		BTN+	OC Great Park Baseball Complex • Irvine, California	**W 3-1**	**Caden Aoki (1-0)**	Ethan McElvain (0-2)	**Ethan Hedges (4)**	3,518	9-1	--
March 2; 2:00 p.m.	at UCLA*		BTN+	Jackie Robinson Stadium • Los Angeles, California	**L 1-5**	Michael Barnett (3-0)	**Michael Ebner (0-1)**	None	1,597	9-2	--
March 4; 6:00 p.m.	vs No. 16 UC Santa Barbara*		BTN+	Page Stadium • Los Angeles, California	**L 1–8**	Nathan Aceves (1–0)	**Jackson Baker (0–1)**	None	291	9–3	--
March 7; 6:30 p.m.	vs No. 10 Oregon		BTN+	OC Great Park Baseball Complex • Irvine, California	**L 2–7**	Grayson Grinsell (2–1)	**Caden Hunter (2–1)**	Jason Reitz (1)	2,319	9–4	0–1
March 8; 2:00 p.m.	vs No. 10 Oregon		BTN+	OC Great Park Baseball Complex • Irvine, California	**L 6–8**	Santiago Garcia (1–0)	**Caden Aoki (1–1)**	Cole Stokes (1)	1,108	9–5	0–2
March 9; 1:00 p.m.	vs No. 10 Oregon		BTN+	OC Great Park Baseball Complex • Irvine, California	**L 3–5**	Michael Meckna (3–0)	**Grant Govel (1–1)**	Ryan Featherson (1)	2,987	9–6	0–3
March 11; 6:00 p.m.	at Cal State Fullerton*		ESPN+	Goodwin Field • Fullerton, California	**L 6–11**	Gavin Meyer (1–0)	**Tee Southisene (0–1)**	None	688	9–7	--
March 14; 1:00 p.m.	at Michigan		BTN+	Ray Fisher Stadium • Ann Arbor, Michigan	**W 7–4**	**Caden Hunter (3–1)**	David Lally Jr. (1–1)	**Ethan Hedges (5)**	1,172	10–7	1–3
March 15; 9:00 a.m.	at Michigan		BTN+	Ray Fisher Stadium • Ann Arbor, Michigan	**W 4–3**	**Caden Aoki (2–1)**	Will Rogers (0–1)	**Mason Edwards (1)**	858	11–7	2–3
March 16; 9:00 a.m.	at Michigan		BTN+	Ray Fisher Stadium • Ann Arbor, Michigan	**L 0–11**(7)	Kurt Barr (1–2)	**Grant Govel (1–2)**	None	805	11–8	2–4
March 18; 6:30 p.m.	at Arizona State*		ESPN+	Phoenix Municipal Stadium • Tempe, Arizona	**W 6–3**	**Sax Matson (1–0)**	Josh Butler (1–1)	**Ethan Hedges (6)**	4,562	12–8	--
March 21; 6:30 p.m.	vs Nebraska		FS1	OC Great Park Baseball Complex • Irvine, California	**W 5–3**	**Caden Hunter (4–1)**	Will Walsh (2–4)	**Mason Edwards (2)**	1,081	13–8	3–4
March 22; 2:00 p.m.	vs Nebraska		BTN+	OC Great Park Baseball Complex • Irvine, California	**L 5–6**	Luke Broderick (1–0)	**Ethan Hedges (0–1)**	None	1,209	13–9	3–5
March 23; 12:00 p.m.	vs Nebraska		BTN+	OC Great Park Baseball Complex • Irvine, California	**W 7–1**	**Grant Govel (2–2)**	Jackson Brockett (0–2)	None	1,304	14–9	4–5
March 25; 6:00 p.m.	vs No. 19 UC Irvine*		BTN+	Page Stadium • Los Angeles, California	**L 9–12**	Ryan Kysar (1–1)	**Dylan Osborne (0–1)**	David Butler (1)	422	14–10	--
March 28; 11:00 a.m.	at Indiana		BTN+	Bart Kaufman Field • Bloomington, Indiana	**W 10–5**	**Caden Hunter (5–1)**	Gavin Seebold (1–3)	**Brodie Purcell (1)**	1,217	15–10	5–5
March 28; 3:00 p.m.	at Indiana		BTN+	Bart Kaufman Field • Bloomington, Indiana	**L 6–13**	Cole Gilley (5–1)	**Caden Aoki (2–2)**	None	1,876	15–11	5–6
March 29; 9:00 a.m.	at Indiana		BTN+	Bart Kaufman Field • Bloomington, Indiana	**W 13–12**	**Jackson Baker (1–1)**	Trey Telfer (0–1)	**Ethan Hedges (7)**	1,987	16–11	6–6

April (14–3)
(Home; 7–2; Away: 7–1)

Date Time	Opponent	Rank	TV	Venue	Score	Win	Loss	Save	Attendance	Overall record	B1G record
April 1; 6:00 p.m.	vs San Diego State*		BTN+	OC Great Park Baseball Complex • Irvine, California	**W 9–6**	**Jude Favela (1–0)**	Thomas Young (0–2)	**Brodie Purcell (2)**	298	17–11	--
April 4; 6:30 p.m.	vs Ohio State		BTN+	OC Great Park Baseball Complex • Irvine, California	**W 5–3**	**Caden Hunter (6–1)**	Drew Erdmann (0–3)	**Brodie Purcell (3)**	897	18–11	7–6
April 5; 2:00 p.m.	vs Ohio State		BTN+	OC Great Park Baseball Complex • Irvine, California	**W 12–9**	**Jude Favela (2–0)**	Blaine Wynk (1–2)	**Ethan Hedges (8)**	1,114	19–11	8–6
April 6; 1:00 p.m.	vs Ohio State		BTN+	OC Great Park Baseball Complex • Irvine, California	**W 10–9**	**Andrew Harbour (1–0)**	Gavin Kuzniewski (3–2)	None	1,124	20–11	9–6
April 8; 6:00 p.m.	at Loyola Marymount* (This is a LMU Home Game)		ESPN+	Page Stadium • Los Angeles, California	**W 14-6**	**Sax Matson (2-0)**	Jacob Hughes (0-3)	**Brodie Purcell (1)**	467	21-11	--
April 11; 2:30 p.m.	at Penn State		BTN+	Medlar Field at Lubrano Park • University Park, Pennsylvania	**L 1-3**	Dimond Loosli (4-0)	**Brodie Purcell (0-2)**	None	548	21-12	9-7
April 12; 2:30 p.m.	at Penn State		BTN+	Medlar Field at Lubrano Park • University Park, Pennsylvania	**W 6-3**	**Caden Aoki (3-2)**	Mason Horwat (4-3)	**Andrew Johnson (1)**	1,845	22-12	10-7
April 13; 10:00 a.m.	at Penn State		BTN+	Medlar Field at Lubrano Park • University Park, Pennsylvania	**W 11-6**	**Brodie Purcell (1-2)**	Logan Olson (0-2)	None	922	23-12	11-7
April 15; 6:00 p.m.	vs Hawaii*		BTN+	Page Stadium • Los Angeles, California	**L 4-5**	Freddy Rodriguez (4-0)	**Sax matson (2-1)**	Ethan Thomas (1)	498	23-13	--
April 17; 6:30 p.m.	vs Gonzaga*		BTN+	OC Great Park Baseball Complex • Irvine, California	**L 6-9**	**Finbar O'brien (4-0)**	**Caden Hunter (6-2)**	Erik Hoffberg (1)	680	23-14	--
April 18; 6:30 p.m.	vs Gonzaga*		BTN+	OC Great Park Baseball Complex • Irvine, California	**W 9-5**	**Andrew Johnson (1-0)**	Michael Cunnelly (1-1)	None	1,027	24-14	--
April 19; 1:00 p.m.	vs Gonzaga*		BTN+	OC Great Park Baseball Complex • Irvine, California	**W 11-1**(8)	**Brodie Purcell (2-2)**	Justin Feld (3-5)	None	1,211	25-14	--
April 22; 6:00 p.m.	at Long Beach State*		ESPN+	Blair Field • Long Beach, California	**W 12-2**	**Grant Govel (3-2)**	Cristien Banda (0-1)	None	2,383	26-14	--
April 25; 4:00 p.m.	at Minnesota		BTN+	Siebert Field • Minneapolis, Minnesota	**W 16-6**	**Andrew Johnson (2-0)**	Joe Sperry (4-1)	None	846	27-14	12-7
April 26; 4:00 p.m.	at Minnesota		BTN+	Siebert Field • Minneapolis, Minnesota	**W 6-1**	**Caden Aoki (4-2)**	Kyle Remington (1-6)	None	958	28-14	13-7
April 27; 11:00 p.m.	at Minnesota		BTN+	Siebert Field • Minneapolis, Minnesota	**W 3-2**	**Brodie Purcell (3-2)**	Eli Sundquist (2-1)	None	714	29-14	14-7
April 29; 6:00 p.m.	at Cal State Northridge*		ESPN+	Hiegert Field • Northridge, California	**W 8-0**	**Jackson Baker (2-1)**	Hayden Hall (0-4)	None	472	30-14	--

May (4–5)
(Home; 3–2; Away: 1–3)

Date Time	Opponent	Rank	TV	Venue	Score	Win	Loss	Save	Attendance	Overall record	B1G record
May 2; 6:30 p.m.	vs No. 14 UCLA		BTN+	OC Great Park Baseball Complex • Irvine, California	**L 6–7**	Wylan Moss (2–1)	**Caden Hunter (6–3)**	Easton Hawk (2)	1,649	30–15	14–8
May 3; 2:00 p.m.	vs No. 14 UCLA		BTN+	OC Great Park Baseball Complex • Irvine, California	**W 7–5**	**Caden Aoki (5–2)**	Michael Barnett (8–1)	**Ethan Hedges (9)**	1,588	31–15	15–8
May 4; 1:00 p.m.	vs No. 14 UCLA		BTN+	OC Great Park Baseball Complex • Irvine, California	**W 11–5**	**Andrew Johnson (3–0)**	Chris Grothues (1–1)	None	2,873	32–15	16–8
May 6; 4:30 p.m.	at UC Santa Barbara*	No. 25	ESPN+	Caesar Uyesaka Stadium • Santa Barbara, California	**L 2–3**	Reed Moring (2–1)	**Dylan Osborne (0–2)**	Cole Tryba (4)	797	32–16	--
May 9; 6:30 p.m.	vs Michigan State	No. 25	BTN+	OC Great Park Baseball Complex • Irvine, California	**L 0–5**	Joseph Dzierwa (8–2)	**Caden Hunter (6–4)**	None	789	32–17	16–9
May 10; 2:00 p.m.	vs Michigan State	No. 25	BTN+	OC Great Park Baseball Complex • Irvine, California	**L 5–15**(8)	Tate Farquhar (3–2)	**Caden Aoki (5–3)**	None	503	32–18	16–10
May 11; 1:00 p.m.	vs Michigan State	No. 25	BTN+	OC Great Park baseball Complex • Irvine, California	**W 10–3**	**Mason Edwards (2–0)**	Nolan Higgins (3–6)	None	703	33–18	17–10
May 15; 6:00 p.m.	at Washington		BTN+	Husky Ballpark • Seattle, Washington						33-19	17-11
May 16; 6:00 p.m.	at Washington		BTN+	Husky Ballpark • Seattle, Washington						33-20	17-12
May 17; 1:00 p.m.	at Washington		BTN+	Husky Ballpark • Seattle, Washington						34-20	18-12

Postseason (3-2)
Big Ten Tournament (1-1)

Date Time	Opponent	Rank	TV	Venue	Score	Win	Loss	Save	Attendance	Overall record	Tournament record
May 22; 11:03 a.m.	vs (9) Penn State (Pool D, Game 1)	(4)	BTN	Charles Schwab Field • Omaha, Nebraska	**L 1-2**	Loosli Dimond (5-1)	**Andrew Johnson (3-1)**	Chase Renner (1)	1,909	34-21	0-1
May 23; 8:00 a.m.	vs (12) Washington (Pool D, Game 2)	(4)	BTN	Charles Schwab Field • Omaha, Nebraska	**W 6-5**	**Ethan Hedges (2-1)**	J Emanuel (2-2)	-	-	35-21	1-1

Corvallis Regional (2-1)

Date Time	Opponent	Rank	TV	Venue	Score	Win	Loss	Save	Attendance	Overall record	NCAAT record
May 30; 12:00 p.m.	(2) No. 24 TCU (Upper Bracket Regional)	(3)	ESPNU	Goss Stadium at Coleman Field • Corvallis, Oregon	**W 13-1**	**Caden Aoki (6-4)**	Tommy LaPour (8-3)	—	4,064	36-21	1-0
May 31; 6:00 p.m.	(4) Saint Mary's (CA) (Upper Winner Bracket)	(3)	ESPN+	Goss Stadium at Coleman Field • Corvallis, Oregon	**W 6-4**	**Mason Edwards (3-0)**	John Damozonio (4-3)	**Caden Hunter (1)**	4,152	37-21	2-0
June 1; 7:40 p.m.	(1) No. 8 Oregon State (Upper Regional Finals)	(3)	ESPN2	Goss Stadium at Coleman Field • Corvallis, Oregon	**L 1-14**	Kellan Oakes (3-0)	**Andrew Johnson (3-2)**	Zach Kmatz (1)	4,347	37-22	2-1
June 2; 3:00 p.m.	(1) No.8 Oregon State (Upper Bracket Game 7)	(3)	ESPNU	Goss Stadium at Coleman Field • Corvallis, Oregon	**L 0-9**	James DeCremer (3-0)	**Caden Hunter (6-6)**	—	4,383	37-23	2-2

"#" represents ranking. All rankings from D1 Baseball Poll on the date of the contest.
"()" represents postseason seeding in the Big 10 Tournament or NCAA Regional, respectively.
= Win, = Loss, = Canceled/Postponed
Bold = **USC Trojans team member**
* = Non-Conference Game
Schedule Source:

=== Postseason ===
==== Big Ten Tournament (Pool D) ====
	Pool D	USC	WASH	PSU
4	USC		1–0	0–1
5	Washington	0–1		0–1
9	Penn State	1–0	1–0	

Pos	Team	Pld	W	L	RF	RA	RD	PCT	Qualification
1	(9) Penn State	2	2	0	7	4	+3	**1.000**	Advanced to Semifinals
2	(4) USC	2	1	1	7	7	0	**.500**	**Eliminated**
3	(5) Washington	2	0	2	8	11	−3	**.000**	**Eliminated**

==== NCAA Tournament ====
Regional	Regional
1	Oregon State	4
**4**	**Saint Mary's (CA)**	**6**
4	Saint Mary's (CA)	4
**3**	**USC**	**6**
**3**	**USC**	**13**
2	TCU	1
Corvallis Regional – Goss Stadium
**1**	**Oregon State**	**7**
4	TCU	2
**1**	**Oregon State**	**20**
4	Saint Mary's (CA)	3
**1**	**Florida State**	**6**
4	Bethune–Cookman	2
**1**	**Florida State**	**10**
3	Mississippi State	3
**3**	**Mississippi State**	**11**
2	Northeastern	2
Tallahassee Regional – Dick Howser Stadium
4	Bethune–Cookman	3
**2**	**Northeastern**	**4**
2	Northeastern	2
**3**	**Mississippi State**	**3**

Regional Final
3	USC	1	0
**1**	**Oregon State**	**14**	**9**
**1**	**Florida State**	**5**	–
3	Mississippi State	2	–

Super Regional; June 7–9
**8**	**Oregon State**	**5**	1	**14**
9	Florida State	4^{10}	**3**	10

== Corvallis Regional ==
Corvallis Regional Teams
No. 8 (1) Oregon State Beavers	(2) TCU Horned Frogs	(3) USC Trojans	(4) Saint Mary's Gaels

- ◆ Ranking based on NCAA tournament seeding

First Round
1	Oregon State	4
4	Saint Mary's (CA)	6
2	TCU	1
3	USC	13
Lower round 1
1	Oregon State	7
3	TCU	2

Semi-Finals
4	Saint Mary's (CA)	4
3	USC	6
Lower final
1	Oregon State	20
4	Saint Mary's (CA)	3

Finals
3	USC	1	0
1	Oregon State	14	9

== Rankings ==
Ranking movements Legend: ██ Increase in ranking ██ Decrease in ranking — = Not ranked RV = Received votes
	Week																
Poll	Pre	1	2	3	4	5	6	7	8	9	10	11	12	13	14	15	Final
Coaches'	RV	RV*	—	RV	—	—	—	—	RV	—	—	—	RV	RV	—	RV	RV
Baseball America	—	—	—									—	—	—	—	—	—
NCBWA†	—	RV	RV	RV	RV	RV	RV	RV	RV	RV	RV	RV	RV	RV	RV	RV	RV
D1Baseball	—	—	—	—	—	—	—	—	—	—	—	—	25	—	—	—	—
Perfect Game	—	—	—	—	—	—	—	—	—	—	—	—	—	—	—	—	—

† NCBWA ranks 30 teams in their preseason poll, but only ranks 25 teams weekly during the season.
* A new poll was not released for this week, so for comparison purposes, the previous week's ranking is inserted in this week's slot.
