= 2025 UCLA Bruins baseball team =

American college baseball season

2025 UCLA Bruins baseball

Big Ten Conference regular season co-champions NCAA Los Angeles Regional champions Los Angeles Super Regional champions

College World Series, 5th
- Conference: Big Ten Conference

Ranking
- Coaches: No. 13
- D1Baseball.com: No. 13
- Record: 48–18 (22–8 Big Ten)
- Head coach: John Savage (21st season)
- Hitting coach: Bryant Ward (11th season)
- Home stadium: Jackie Robinson Stadium

2025 Big Ten Conference baseball standings
	Conf.						Overall
Team	W		L		T	PCT	W		L		T	PCT
No. 5 Oregon ‍†‍‍^{y}	22	–	8	–	0	.733	42	–	16	–	0	.724
No. 13 UCLA ‍†‍‍^{y}	22	–	8	–	0	.733	48	–	16	–	0	.750
Iowa ‍‍‍	21	–	9	–	0	.700	33	–	22	–	1	.598
USC ‍‍‍^{y}	18	–	12	–	0	.600	37	–	23	–	0	.617
Washington ‍‍‍	17	–	13	–	0	.567	29	–	28	–	0	.509
Indiana ‍‍‍	16	–	14	–	0	.533	32	–	24	–	0	.571
Michigan ‍‍‍	16	–	14	–	0	.533	33	–	23	–	0	.589
Nebraska ‍‍‡‍^{y}	15	–	15	–	0	.500	33	–	29	–	0	.532
Penn State ‍‍‍	15	–	15	–	0	.500	33	–	23	–	0	.589
Rutgers ‍‍‍	15	–	15	–	0	.500	29	–	28	–	0	.509
Illinois ‍‍‍	14	–	16	–	0	.467	30	–	24	–	0	.556
Michigan State ‍‍‍	13	–	17	–	0	.433	28	–	27	–	0	.509
Northwestern ‍‍‍	13	–	17	–	0	.433	25	–	27	–	0	.481
Maryland ‍‍‍	12	–	18	–	0	.400	27	–	29	–	0	.482
Purdue ‍‍‍	11	–	19	–	0	.367	31	–	23	–	0	.574
Minnesota ‍‍‍	10	–	20	–	0	.333	24	–	28	–	0	.462
Ohio State ‍‍‍	5	–	25	–	0	.167	13	–	37	–	0	.260
† – Conference champion ‡ – Tournament champion y – Invited to the NCAA tournament As of June 2, 2025; Rankings from D1Baseball

The 2025 UCLA Bruins baseball team represented the University of California, Los Angeles during the 2025 NCAA Division I baseball season. The Bruins played their home games at Jackie Robinson Stadium as a member of the Big Ten Conference. They were led by head coach John Savage, in his 21st season at UCLA. In their first season in the new conference, the Bruins captured a share of the Big-10 Championship with fellow former Pac-12 member Oregon.

The Bruins advanced to the championship game of the 2025 Big Ten baseball tournament, where they lost to the Nebraska Cornhuskers. The Bruins received an at-large bid to the 2025 NCAA Division I baseball tournament. The hosted a Los Angeles Regional, and then a super-regional. The Bruins advanced to the 2025 Men's College World Series by defeating UT San Antonio. They defeated the Murray State Racers in the first series game. The Racers were a rare #4 seed that advanced to the College World series. The Bruins' first loss came to the eventual national champions, the LSU Tigers, 5-9. That game that started Monday night June 16 and ended early Tuesday afternoon June 17, 2025, because it was suspended due to severe weather and resumed the following morning. That afternoon, UCLA was eliminated by the Arkansas Razorbacks.

== Previous season ==
The Bruins finished with a record of 19–33, and 9–21 in conference play.

== Personnel ==
=== Roster ===
2025 UCLA Bruins roster
Pitchers: 2 - Cody Delvecchio - Junior; 26 - Rex Solle - Freshman; 37 - Will Goldberg - (redshirt) Sophomore; 10 - Ian May - (redshirt) Junior; 25 - CJ Bott - Freshman; 30 - August Souza - Graduate Student; 31 - Chris Aldrich - (redshirt) Senior; 38 - Justin Cuellar - Freshman; 47 - Kaena Kiakona - Sophomore; 14 - Landon Stump - Sophomore; 16 - Jack O'Connor - Junior; 18 - Wylan Moss - Freshman; 20 - Justin Lee - Sophomore; 21 - Josh Alger - (redshirt) Junior; 27 - Easton Hawk - Freshman; 45 - Chris Grothues - (redshirt) Sophomore; 50 - Nate Leibold - Senior; 51 - Ryan Rissas - Graduate Student; 28 - Cal Randall - Sophomore; 34 - Luke Rodriguez - Sophomore; 55 - Michael Barnett - Junior; 29 - Finn Mcllroy - Junior; 32 - James Hepp - (redshirt) Junior	Catchers: 33 - Blake Balsz - Sophomore; 8 - Kasen Khansarinia - Freshman; 40 - Cashel Dugger - Sophomore; Infielders: 19 - David Mysza - Freshman; 4 - Phoenix Call - Sophomore; 39 - Mulivai Levu - Sophomore; 1 - Roch Cholowsky - Sophomore; 7 - Roman Martin - Sophomore; 9 - Cameron Kim - Sophomore; 6 - Grant Gray - Sophomore	Outfielders: 15 - Jarrod Hocking - Junior; 36 - Dean West - Sophomore; 5 - Aidan Espinoza - (redshirt) Freshman; 44 - Toussaint Bythewood - Junior; 11 - Payton Brennan - (redshirt) Sophomore; 35 - Logan de Groot - Freshman	Two Way Players: 24 - AJ Salgado - (redshirt) Senior

=== Coaches ===
2025 UCLA Bruins baseball coaching staff
- John Savage – head coach – 21st season
- Bryant Ward – assistant coach – 10th season
- Niko Gallego – assistant coach – 11th season
- Griffin Barnes – assistant coach – 1st season

Note: Season counter accounts for all stints at UCLA.

== Schedule and results ==
2025 UCLA Bruins baseball game log (48–18)
Regular season (39–15)
February (7–3)
(Home; 5–2; Away: 0-0; Neutral: 2–1)

Date Time	Opponent	Rank	TV	Venue	Score	Win	Loss	Save	Attendance	Overall record	B1G record
February 14th 5:00 p.m.	vs Cal Poly		BTN+	Jackie Robinson Stadium • Los Angeles, California	**W 3-2**	**Justin Lee (1-0)**	Jaccob Torres (0-1)	**Wylan Moss (1)**	503	1-0	--
February 15th 2:00 p.m.	vs Cal Poly*		BTN+	Jackie Robinson Stadium • Los Angeles, California	**W 18-2**	**Ian May (1-0)**	Josh Volmerding (0-1)	—	661	2-0	--
February 16th 1:00 p.m.	vs Cal Poly*		BTN+	Jackie Robinson Stadium • Los Angeles, California	**W 16-0**	**Landon Stump (1-0)**	Ethan Marmie (0-1)	—	851	3-0	--
February 18th 5:00 p.m.	BYU		BTN+	Jackie Robinson Stadium • Los Angeles, California	**W 15-4**	**Michael Bernett (1-0)**	Carter Foss (0-1)	—	396	4-0	--
Kleberg Bank Classic
February 21st 4:00 p.m.	Texas A&M-Corpus Christi*		FloSports	Whataburger Field • Corpus Christi, Texas	L 3–4	Zach Garcia (1–0)	**Cody Delvecchio (0–1)**	Cam Soliz (1)	765	4–1	--
February 22nd 12:00 p.m.	Washington State*		FloSports	Whataburger Field • Corpus Christi, Texas	**W 7–6**	**Justin Lee (2–0)**	Jake Tedesco (0–2)	—	5–1	--	--
February 23rd 8:30 a.m.	Michigan State*		FloSports	Whataburger Field • Corpus Christi, Texas	**W 15–9**	**Michael Barnett (2–0)**	Tyler Horvath (0–1)	—	50	6–1	--
February 25th 5:00 p.m.	vs Arizona State*		BTN+	Jackie Robinson Stadium • Los Angeles, California	**W 8–4**	**Jack O'Connor (1–0)**	Easton Barrett (0–1)	—	385	7–1	--
February 26th 2:00 p.m.	vs Arizona State*		BTN+	Jackie Robinson Stadium • Los Angeles, California	L 0–2	Carlon Cole (1–0)	**Ryan Rissas (0–1)**	Sean Fitzpatrick (1)	392	7–2	--
Southern California College Baseball Classic
February 28th 5:00 p.m.	vs No. 14 Vanderbilt*		BTN+	Jackie Robinson Stadium • Los Angeles, California	L 3–8	JD Thompson (1–0)	**Cody Delvecchio (0–2)**	Alex Kranzler (1)	1,095	7–3	--

March (15–2)
(Home; 10–1; Away: 5–1)

Date Time	Opponent	Rank	TV	Venue	Score	Win	Loss	Save	Attendance	Overall record	Big Ten record
March 1st 2:00 p.m.	vs UConn*		BTN+	Jackie Robinson Stadium • Los Angeles, California	W 8–6	**CJ Bott (1–0)**	Ian Cooke (0–3)	**Wylan Moss (1)**	427	8–3	--
March 2nd 2:00 p.m.	USC*; Rivalry		BTN+	Jackie Robinson Stadium • Los Angeles, California	**W 5–1**	**Michael Barnett (3–0)**	Michael Ebner (0–1)	—	1,597	9–3	--
March 4th 5:00 p.m.	vs Michigan		BTN+	Jackie Robinson Stadium • Los Angeles, California	**W 22–5**	**Luke Rodriguez (1–0)**	Kurt Barr (0–2)	—	453	10–3	--
March 7th 1:00 p.m.	at Maryland		BTN+	Bob "Turtle" Smith Stadium • College Park, Maryland	W 12–6	**Wylan Moss (1–0)**	Ryan Van Buren (1–2)	—	1,086	11–3	1–0
March 8th 11:00 a.m.	at Maryland		BTN+	Bob "Turtle" Smith Stadium • College Park, Maryland	L 3–13	Logan Hastings (1–0)	**Ian May (1–1)**	—	1,241	11–4	1–1
March 9th 9:00 a.m.	at Maryland		BTN+	Bob "Turtle" Smith Stadium • College Park, Maryland	**W 11–5**	**Michael Barnett (4–0)**	Joey McMannis (0–1)	—	1,215	12–4	2–1
March 11th 6:00 p.m.	vs No. 18 UC Irvine*		BTN+	Jackie Robinson Stadium • Los Angeles, California	**W 11–4**	**Ian May (2–1)**	Ryan Kysar (0–1)	—	317	13–4	--
March 14th 6:00 p.m.	vs Nebraska		BTN+	Jackie Robinson Stadium • Los Angeles, California	**W 5–2**	**Ian May (3–1)**	Will Walsh (2–3)	**Justin Lee (1)**	370	14–4	3–1
March 15th 2:00 p.m.	vs Nebraska		BTN+	Jackie Robinson Stadium • Los Angeles, California	**W 11–3**	**Michael Barnett (5–0)**	Ty Horn (0–3)	—	629	15–4	4–1
March 16th 1:00 p.m.	vs Nebraska		BTN+	Jackie Robinson Stadium • Los Angeles, California	**W 5–3**	**Jack O'Connor (2–0)**	Caleb Clark (0–1)	**Justin Lee (2)**	623	16–4	5–1
March 21st 6:00 p.m.	vs Indiana		BTN+	Jackie Robinson Stadium • Los Angeles, California	L 1–5	Cole Gilley (3–1)	**Cody Delvecchio (0–3)**	—	517	16–5	5–2
March 22nd 2:00 p.m.	vs Indiana		BTN+	Jackie Robinson Stadium • Los Angeles, California	**W** 7–4	**Michael Barnett (6–0)**	Ben Grable (3–1)	**Justin Lee (3)**	573	17–5	6–2
March 23rd 1:00 p.m.	vs Indiana		BTN+	Jackie Robinson Stadium • Los Angeles, California	**W** 6–3	**Landon Stump (2–0)**	Deron Swanson (1–1)	—	747	18–5	7–2
March 25th 6:00 p.m.	vs LMU*	No. 24	BTN+	Jackie Robinson Stadium • Los Angeles, California	**W** 9–8	**Luke Rodriguez (2–0)**	Jacob Hughes (0–2)	—	391	19–5	--
March 28th 3:00 p.m.	at Purdue	No. 24	BTN+	Alexander Field • West Lafayette, Indiana	**W** 8–5	**Cody Delvecchio (1–3)**	Carter Doorn (4–2)	**Justin Lee** (4)	1,444	20–5	8–2
March 29th 11:00 a.m.	at Purdue	No. 24	BTN+	Alexander Field • West Lafayette, Indiana	**W** 13–12	**Ian May (4–1)**	Isaac Milburn (2–2)	**Jack O'Connor (1)**	1,350	21–5	9–2
March 30th 9:00 a.m.	at Purdue	No. 24	BTN+	Alexander Field • West Lafayette, Indiana	**W** 16–3^{8}	**Landon Stump (3–0)**	Cole Van Assen (2–2)	–	None	22–5	10–2

April (11–6)
(Home; 9–2; Away: 2–4)

Date Time	Opponent	Rank	TV	Venue	Score	Win	Loss	Save	Attendance	Overall record	Big Ten record
April 1st 6:00 p.m.	vs Pepperdine*	No. 14	BTN+	Jackie Robinson Stadium • Los Angeles, California	**W** 10–8	**CJ Bott** (2–0)	Kam Croghan (0–2)		313	23–5	--
April 4th 6:00 p.m.	vs San Diego*	No. 14	BTN+	Jackie Robinson Stadium • Los Angeles, California	**W** 15–2^{7}	**Ian May (5–1)**	Austin Smith (1–4)		318	24–5	--
April 5th 2:00 p.m.	vs San Diego*	No. 14	BTN+	Jackie Robinson Stadium • Los Angeles, California	**W** 7–6	**Cal Randall (1–0)**	Andrew Mosiello (1–4)	**Justin Lee (5)**	562	25–5	--
April 6th 1:00 p.m.	vs San Diego*	No. 14	BTN+	Jackie Robinson Stadium • Los Angeles, California	**L** 3–4^{14}	Dallin Harrison (1–0)	**CJ Bott (2–1)**	None	779	25–6	--
April 8th 6:00 p.m.	vs Long Beach State*	No. 10	BTN+	Jackie Robinson Stadium • Los Angeles, California	**W** 12–1^{7}	**Josh Alger (1–0)**	Alex Ramos (0–2)	None	341	26–6	--
April 11th 6:00 p.m.	vs Washington	No. 10	BTN+	Jackies Robinson Stadium • Los Angeles, California	**L** 2–5	Max Banks (4–2)	**Cal Randall (1–1)**	Isaac Yeager (1)	509	26–7	10–3
April 12th 2:00 p.m.	vs Washington	No. 10	BTN+	Jackie Robinson Stadium • Los Angeles, California	**W** 7–3	**Michael Barnett (7–0)**	Thomas (3–3)	None	603	27–7	11–3
April 13th 1:00 p.m.	vs Washington	No. 10	BTN+	Jackie Robinson Stadium • Los Angeles, California	**W** 13–9	**Chris Grothues (1–0)**	Josh Emanuels (0–1)	None	598	28–7	12–3
April 15th 6:00 p.m.	vs No. 6 Oregon State*	No. 10	BTN	Jackie Robinson Stadium • Los Angeles, California	**L** 1–7	James DeCremer (2–0)	**Ian May (5–2)**	Laif Palmer (2)	716	28–8	--
April 18th 5:05 p.m.	at No. 16 Oregon	No. 10	BTN+	PK Park • Eugene, Oregon	**L** 1–2	Grayson Grinsell (6–1)	**Wylan Moss (1–1)**	None	3,524	28–9	12–4
April 19th 2:05 p.m.	at No. 16 Oregon	No. 10	BTN+	PK Park • Eugene, Oregon	**W** 14–4^{8}	**Ian May (6–2)**	Will Sanford (2–2)	None	3,973	29–9	13–4
April 20th 12:05 p.m.	at No. 16 Oregon	No. 10	BTN	PK Park • Eugene, Oregon	**L** 6–10	Seth Mattox (2–0)	**Easton Hawk (0–1)**	None	3,005	29–10	13–5
April 22nd 6:00 p.m.	at No. 12 UC Irvine*	No. 15	ESPN+	Anteater Ballpark • Irvine, California	**L** 3–5	Ricky Ojeda (9–0)	**James Hepp (0–1)**	None	1,727	29–11	--
April 25th 6:00 p.m.	vs Penn State	No. 15	BTN+	Jackie Robinson Stadium • Los Angeles, California	**W** 7–6	**Easton Hawk (1–1)**	Ben Demell (4–2)	None	725	30–11	14–5
April 26th 2:00 p.m.	vs Penn State	No. 15	BTN+	Jackie Robinson Stadium • Los Angeles, California	**W** 9–1	**Michael Barnett (8–0)**	Mason Horwat (4–4)	None	657	31–11	15–5
April 27th 1:00 p.m.	vs Penn State	No. 15	BTN+	Jackie Robinson Stadium • Los Angeles, California	**W** 6–3	**Landon Stump (4–0)**	Logan Olson (0–3)	**Easton Hawk (1)**	1,158	32–11	16–5
April 29th 6:00 p.m.	at LMU*	No. 14	ESPN+	Page Stadium • Los Angeles, California	**W** 7–2	**Cal Randall (1–2)**	Behrens (3–1)	None	433	33–11	--

May (5–4)
(Home; 2–1; Away: 3–3)

Date Time	Opponent	Rank	TV	Venue	Score	Win	Loss	Save	Attendance	Overall record	Big Ten record
May 2nd 6:30 p.m.	at USC; Rivalry	No. 14	BTN+	OC Great Park Baseball Complex • Irvine, California	**W** 7–6	**Wylan Moss (2–1)**	Caden Hunter (6–3)	**Easton Hawk (2)**	1,649	34–11	17–5
May 3rd 2:00 p.m.	at USC; Rivalry	No. 14	BTN+	OC Great Park Baseball Complex • Irvine, California	**L** 5–7	Caden Aoki (5–2)	**Michael Barnett (8–1)**	Ethan Hedges (9)	1,588	34–12	17–6
May 4th 1:00 p.m.	at USC; Rivalry	No. 14	BTN+	OC Great Park Baseball Complex • Irvine, California	**L** 5–11	Andrew Johnson (3–0)	**Chris Grothues (1–1)**	None	2,873	34–13	17–7
May 6th 6:00 p.m.	at Long Beach State*	No. 18	ESPN+	Blair Field • Long Beach, California	**L** 2–4	Van Larson (1–0)	**Ryan Rissas (0–2)**	Josh Donegan (1)	2,208	34–14	--
May 9th 4:00 p.m.	at Illinois	No. 18	BTN+	Illinois Field • Champaign, Illinois	**W** 10–9	**Justin Lee (3–0)**	Zach Bates (1–1)	**Easton Hawk (3)**	1,852	35–14	18–7
May 10th 1:00 p.m.	at Illinois	No. 18	BTN+	Illinois Field • Champaign, Illinois	**W** 9–1	**Michael Barnett (9–1)**	Regan Hall (6–4)	None	1,386	36–14	19–7
May 11th 10:00 a.m.	at Illinois	No. 18	BTN+	Illinois Field • Champaign, Illinois	**W** 8–4	**Landon Stump (5–0)**	Payton Hutchings (2–2)	**Easton Hawk** (4)	1,074	37–14	20–7
May 15th 6:00 p.m.	vs Northwestern	No. 14	BTN+	Jackie Robinson Stadium • Los Angeles, California	**L** 4–9	Sam Hliboki (4–3)	**Ian May (6–3)**	Crawford Wade (5)	390	37–15	20–8
May 16th 2:00 p.m.	vs Northwestern	No. 14	BTN+	Jackie Robinson Stadium • Los Angeles, California	**W** 8–2	**Michael Barnett (10–1)**	Matthew Kouser (4–6)	None	911	38–15	21–8
May 17th 1:00 p.m.	vs Northwestern	No. 14	BTN+	Jackie Robinson Stadium • Los Angeles, California	**W** 11–1^{7}	**Landon Stump (6–0)**	Blake MacMillan (5–3)	None	885	39–15	22–8

Postseason (9–3)
Big Ten Tournament (3–1)

Date Time	Opponent	Rank	TV	Venue	Score	Win	Loss	Save	Attendance	Overall record	Tournament record
May 21; 10:00 a.m.	vs (11) Illinois	(2) No. 13	BTN	Charles Schwab Field • Omaha, Nebraska	**W** 8–6	**Jack O'Connor** (3–0)	Mitch Dye (0–2)	**Easton Hawk** (5)		40–15	1–0
May 22; 10:00 a.m.	vs (7) Michigan	(2) No. 13	BTN	Charles Schwab Field • Omaha, Nebraska	**W** 7–5	**Ryan Rissas** (1–2)	Preston Barr (1–1)	**August Souza** (1)		41–15	2–0
May 24; 2:00 p.m.	vs (3) Iowa	(2) No. 13	BTN	Charles Schwab Field • Omaha, Nebraska	**W** 9–3	**Michael Barnett (11–1)**	Aaron Savary (7–2)	None		42–15	3–0
May 25; 2:00 p.m.	vs (8) Nebraska	(2) No. 13	BTN	Charles Schwab Field • Omaha, Nebraska	L 0–5	Ty Horn (3–4)	**Landon Stump** (6–1)	None	15,139	42–16	3–1

NCAA Los Angeles Regional (3–0)

Date Time	Opponent	Rank	TV	Venue	Score	Win	Loss	Save	Attendance	Overall record	NCAAT record
May 30; 1:00 p.m.	vs (4) Fresno State	(1) No. 13	ESPN+	Jackie Robinson Stadium • Los Angeles, California	**W** 19–4	**Chris Grothues** (2–1)	Jack Anker (9–5)	None	1,245	43–16	1–0
May 31; 6:00 p.m.	vs (3) Arizona State	(1) No. 13	ESPN+	Jackie Robinson Stadium • Los Angeles, California	**W** 11–5	**Ian May** (7–3)	Jack Martinez (6–4)	None	1,185	44–16	2–0
June 1; 7:00 p.m. Regional Final	vs (2) No. 23 UC Irvine	(1) No. 13	ESPN+	Jackie Robinson Stadium • Los Angeles, California	**W** 8–5	**Cris Grothues** (3–1)	Finnegan Wall (0–1)	**Easton Hawk** (6)	1,070	45-16	3-0

NCAA Los Angeles Super Regional (2–0)

Date Time	Opponent	Rank	TV	Venue	Score	Win	Loss	Save	Attendance	Overall record	NCAAT record
June 7; 4:00 p.m	vs UTSA	(15) No. 13	ESPNU	Jackie Robinson Stadium • Los Angeles, California	**W** 5–2	**Michael Barnett** (12-1)	Zach Royse (9-5)	**Easton Hawk** (7)	1,392	46-16	4–0
June 8; 12:00 p.m.	vs UTSA	(15) No. 13	ESPN2	Jackie Robinson Stadium • Los Angeles, California	**W** 7–0	**Cris Grothues** (4–1)	Conor Myles (5–2)	None	1,793	47–16	5–0

College World Series (1–2)

Date Time	Opponent	Rank	TV	Venue	Score	Win	Loss	Save	Attendance	Overall record	NCAAT record
June 14; 11:00 a.m.	vs Murray State	(15) No. 13	ESPN	Charles Schwab Field • Omaha, Nebraska	**W** 6–4	**Ian May** (8–3)	Nic Schutte (8–5)	**Easton Hawk** (8)	24,346	48—16	6—0
June 16; 4:00 p.m.	vs (6) No. 3 LSU	(15) No. 13	ESPN; ESPN2	Charles Schwab Field • Omaha, Nebraska	L 5–9	Casan Evans (5–1)	**Landon Stump** (6–2)	Chase Shores (1)	24,623	48—17	6—1
June 17; 4:00 p.m.	vs (3) No. 6 Arkansas	(15) No. 13	ESPN	Charles Schwab Field • Omaha, Nebraska	L 3–7	Zach Root (9–8)	**Cody Delvecchio** (1–4)	None	24,171	48—18	6—2

"#" represents ranking. All rankings from D1 Baseball Poll on the date of the contest.
"()" represents postseason seeding in the Big 10 Tournament or NCAA Regional, respectively.
= Win, = Loss, = Canceled/Postponed
Bold = **UCLA Bruins team member**
* = Non-Conference Game
Schedule Source:

== Rankings ==
Ranking movements Legend: ██ Increase in ranking ██ Decrease in ranking — = Not ranked RV = Received votes
	Week																			
Poll	Pre	1	2	3	4	5	6	7	8	9	10	11	12	13	14	15	16	17	18	Final
Coaches'	—	—*				RV	RV	15	11	12	15	14	17	15	13	13				
Baseball America	—					—	25	17	17	14	18	20	24	20	15	15*				
NCBWA†	—					RV	25	14	12	11	14	15	17	18	16	14				
D1Baseball	—					—	24	14	10	10	15	14	18	14	13	13				
Perfect Game	—				—	24	23	10	9	9	17	15	19	17	16	16*				

† NCBWA ranks 30 teams in their preseason poll, but only ranks 25 teams weekly during the season.
* A new poll was not released for this week, so for comparison purposes, the previous week's ranking is inserted in this week's slot.

== Awards and honors ==
- May 20, 2025 – Roch Cholowsky was named Big Ten Conference Player of the Year and Defensive Player of the Year
- June 6, 2025 – Roch Cholowsky was named the National Collegiate Baseball Writers Association (NCBWA) District 9 Player of the Year
- June 10, 2025 – Roch Cholowsky was named the Perfect Game College Player of the Year
- June 12, 2025 – Roch Cholowsky was named to the NCBWA Second Team All-America
- Junw 13, 2025 – Roch Cholowsky was the winner of the 2025 Brooks Wallace Award
- June 13, 2025 – Roch Cholowsky was named to the American Baseball Coaches Association (ABCA) First Team All-America
- June 18, 2025 – Mulivai Levu was named the ABCA/Rawlings Gold Glove Awards winner
- June 18, 2025 – Roch Cholowsky was named the ABCA/Rawlings Gold Glove Awards winner

== 2025 MLB draft ==
UCLA had one player selected in the 2025 Major League Baseball draft.

Player	Position	Round	Overall	MLB Team
Cody Delvecchio	P	12	356	San Francisco Giants
