= 2025 Big Ten baseball tournament =

American college baseball tournament

- Teams: 12
- Format: Pool Play and Single-elimination
- Finals site: Charles Schwab Field Omaha; Omaha, Nebraska
- Champions: Nebraska (2nd title)
- Runner-up: UCLA (1st title game)
- Winning coach: Will Bolt (2nd title)
- MVP: Roch Cholowsky (UCLA)
- Television: BTN

2025 Big Ten Conference baseball standings
	Conf.						Overall
Team	W		L		T	PCT	W		L		T	PCT
No. 5 Oregon ‍†‍‍^{y}	22	–	8	–	0	.733	42	–	16	–	0	.724
No. 13 UCLA ‍†‍‍^{y}	22	–	8	–	0	.733	48	–	16	–	0	.750
Iowa ‍‍‍	21	–	9	–	0	.700	33	–	22	–	1	.598
USC ‍‍‍^{y}	18	–	12	–	0	.600	37	–	23	–	0	.617
Washington ‍‍‍	17	–	13	–	0	.567	29	–	28	–	0	.509
Indiana ‍‍‍	16	–	14	–	0	.533	32	–	24	–	0	.571
Michigan ‍‍‍	16	–	14	–	0	.533	33	–	23	–	0	.589
Nebraska ‍‍‡‍^{y}	15	–	15	–	0	.500	33	–	29	–	0	.532
Penn State ‍‍‍	15	–	15	–	0	.500	33	–	23	–	0	.589
Rutgers ‍‍‍	15	–	15	–	0	.500	29	–	28	–	0	.509
Illinois ‍‍‍	14	–	16	–	0	.467	30	–	24	–	0	.556
Michigan State ‍‍‍	13	–	17	–	0	.433	28	–	27	–	0	.509
Northwestern ‍‍‍	13	–	17	–	0	.433	25	–	27	–	0	.481
Maryland ‍‍‍	12	–	18	–	0	.400	27	–	29	–	0	.482
Purdue ‍‍‍	11	–	19	–	0	.367	31	–	23	–	0	.574
Minnesota ‍‍‍	10	–	20	–	0	.333	24	–	28	–	0	.462
Ohio State ‍‍‍	5	–	25	–	0	.167	13	–	37	–	0	.260
† – Conference champion ‡ – Tournament champion y – Invited to the NCAA tournament As of June 2, 2025; Rankings from D1Baseball

The 2025 Big Ten baseball tournament was held at Charles Schwab Field Omaha in Omaha, Nebraska, from May 20 through May 25, and aired on the Big Ten Network. Nebraska won the tournament and earned the conference's automatic bid to the 2025 NCAA Division I baseball tournament.

== Format and seeding ==
The 2025 tournament was contested under Pool Play and a single-elimination among the top twelve Big Ten Conference baseball teams with the best regular season conference winning percentage. These twelve teams received tournament seeds, number one through twelve, according to the team's final placement in the regular season standings. A run rule (10 run lead after 7 innings) was in effect for the tournament.

Pool A	Pool B	Pool C	Pool D
#1 Oregon	#2 UCLA	#3 Iowa	#4 USC
#8 Nebraska	#7 Michigan	#6 Indiana	#5 Washington
#12 Michigan State	#11 Illinois	#10 Rutgers	#9 Penn State

=== Pool A ===
	Pool A	ORE	NEB	MSU
1	Oregon		0–1	1–0
8	Nebraska	1–0		1–0
12	Michigan State	0–1	0–1	

Pos	Team	Pld	W	L	RF	RA	RD	PCT	Qualification
1	(8) Nebraska	2	2	0	12	7	+5	1.000	Advanced to Semifinals
2	(1) Oregon	2	1	1	7	9	−2	.500	Eliminated
3	(12) Michigan State	2	0	2	6	9	−3	.000	Eliminated

=== Pool B ===
	Pool B	UCLA	MICH	ILL
2	UCLA		1–0	1–0
7	Michigan	0–1		0–1
11	Illinois	0–1	1–0	

Pos	Team	Pld	W	L	RF	RA	RD	PCT	Qualification
1	(2) UCLA	2	2	0	15	11	+4	1.000	Advanced to Semifinals
2	(11) Illinois	2	1	1	12	13	−1	.500	Eliminated
3	(7) Michigan	2	0	2	10	13	−3	.000	Eliminated

=== Pool C ===
	Pool C	IOWA	IND	RUT
3	Iowa		0–1	1–0
6	Indiana	1–0		0–1
10	Rutgers	0–1	1–0	

Pos	Team	Pld	W	L	RF	RA	RD	PCT	Qualification
1	(3) Iowa	2	1	1	4	8	−4	.500	Advanced to Semifinals
2	(10) Rutgers	2	1	1	8	6	+2	.500	Eliminated
3	(6) Indiana	2	1	1	7	5	+2	.500	Eliminated

Iowa advanced as they were the highest seed in the group.

=== Pool D ===
	Pool D	USC	WASH	PSU
4	USC		1–0	0–1
5	Washington	0–1		0–1
9	Penn State	1–0	1–0	

Pos	Team	Pld	W	L	RF	RA	RD	PCT	Qualification
1	(9) Penn State	2	2	0	7	4	+3	1.000	Advanced to Semifinals
2	(4) USC	2	1	1	7	7	0	.500	Eliminated
3	(5) Washington	2	0	2	8	11	−3	.000	Eliminated

== Finals ==
Semifinals May 24
8	Nebraska	6
9	Penn State	3
3	Iowa	3
2	UCLA	9

Final May 25
8	Nebraska	5
2	UCLA	0

== Schedule ==
2025 Bracket, home teams listed last.

Game	Time*	Matchup^{#}	Score	Television	Attendance
Pool Play - Tuesday, May 20
1	10:00 a.m.	**#11 Illinois** vs #7 Michigan	6–5^{(10)}	BTN	2,843
2	2:35 p.m.	**#10 Rutgers** vs #6 Indiana	5–2	BTN	2,843
3	6:23 p.m.	#12 Michigan State vs **#8 Nebraska**	4–5^{(10)}	BTN	2,843
Pool Play – Wednesday, May 21
4	10:00 a.m.	**#2 UCLA** vs #11 Illinois	8–6	BTN	2,343
5	2:00 p.m.	**#9 Penn State** vs #5 Washington	5–3	BTN	2,343
6	6:00 p.m.	**#3 Iowa** vs #10 Rutgers	4–3	BTN	2,343
Pool Play - Thursday, May 22
7	9:05 a.m.	#7 Michigan vs **#2 UCLA**	5–7	BTN	1,909
8	1:03 p.m.	#4 USC vs **#9 Penn State**	1–2	BTN	1,909
9	5:11 p.m.	**#1 Oregon** vs #12 Michigan State	4–2	BTN	1,909
10	9:02 p.m.	**#6 Indiana** vs #3 Iowa	5–0	BTN	1,909
Pool Play - Friday, May 23
11	10:00 a.m.	#5 Washington vs **#4 USC**	5–6	BTN	--
Pool Play and Semifinals - Saturday, May 24
12	9:00 a.m.	**#8 Nebraska** vs #1 Oregon	7–3	BTN	8,541
13	1:00 p.m.	**#2 UCLA** vs #3 Iowa	9–3	BTN	8,541
14	5:00 p.m.	**#8 Nebraska** vs #9 Penn State	6–3	BTN	8,541
Championship - Sunday, May 25
15	2:00 p.m.	#2 UCLA vs **#8 Nebraska**	0–5	BTN	15,139
*Game times in CDT. # – Rankings denote tournament seed.

=== All-tournament Team ===
The following players are members of the 2025 Big Ten Baseball All-Tournament Team. Player in Bold selected as Tournament MVP.

Position	Player	School
C	Noah Miller	Michigan
1B	Drake Westcott	Illinois
2B	Cayden Brumbaugh	Nebraska
3B	Roman Martin	UCLA
SS	**Roch Cholowsky**	UCLA
DH	Dominic Hellman	Oregon
OF	Devin Taylor	Indiana
OF	Gabe Swansen	Nebraska
OF	Paxton Kling	Penn State
P	Cade Obermueller	Iowa
P	Jackson Brockett	Nebraska
P	Luke Broderick	Nebraska
