= 2025 Iowa Hawkeyes baseball team =

American college baseball season

2025 Iowa Hawkeyes baseball
- Conference: Big Ten Conference
- Record: 33–22–1 (21–9 B1G)
- Head coach: Rick Heller (12th season)
- Associate head coach: Marty Sutherland (12th season)
- Assistant coach: Nic Ungs (7th season)
- Hitting coach: Mitchell Boe (3rd season)
- Pitching coach: Sean Kenny (1st season)
- Home stadium: Duane Banks Field

2025 Big Ten Conference baseball standings
	Conf.						Overall
Team	W		L		T	PCT	W		L		T	PCT
No. 5 Oregon ‍†‍‍^{y}	22	–	8	–	0	.733	42	–	16	–	0	.724
No. 13 UCLA ‍†‍‍^{y}	22	–	8	–	0	.733	48	–	16	–	0	.750
Iowa ‍‍‍	21	–	9	–	0	.700	33	–	22	–	1	.598
USC ‍‍‍^{y}	18	–	12	–	0	.600	37	–	23	–	0	.617
Washington ‍‍‍	17	–	13	–	0	.567	29	–	28	–	0	.509
Indiana ‍‍‍	16	–	14	–	0	.533	32	–	24	–	0	.571
Michigan ‍‍‍	16	–	14	–	0	.533	33	–	23	–	0	.589
Nebraska ‍‍‡‍^{y}	15	–	15	–	0	.500	33	–	29	–	0	.532
Penn State ‍‍‍	15	–	15	–	0	.500	33	–	23	–	0	.589
Rutgers ‍‍‍	15	–	15	–	0	.500	29	–	28	–	0	.509
Illinois ‍‍‍	14	–	16	–	0	.467	30	–	24	–	0	.556
Michigan State ‍‍‍	13	–	17	–	0	.433	28	–	27	–	0	.509
Northwestern ‍‍‍	13	–	17	–	0	.433	25	–	27	–	0	.481
Maryland ‍‍‍	12	–	18	–	0	.400	27	–	29	–	0	.482
Purdue ‍‍‍	11	–	19	–	0	.367	31	–	23	–	0	.574
Minnesota ‍‍‍	10	–	20	–	0	.333	24	–	28	–	0	.462
Ohio State ‍‍‍	5	–	25	–	0	.167	13	–	37	–	0	.260
† – Conference champion ‡ – Tournament champion y – Invited to the NCAA tournament As of June 2, 2025; Rankings from D1Baseball

The 2025 Iowa Hawkeyes baseball team represents the University of Iowa during the 2025 NCAA Division I baseball season. The Hawkeyes play their home games at Duane Banks Field in Iowa City, Iowa as a member of the Big Ten Conference (B1G). They are led by head coach Rick Heller, in his twelfth season with the program.

== Previous season ==
The 2024 Iowa Hawkeyes baseball team posted a 31–23 overall and 14–10 in Big Ten (B1G) play good for 4th place.

== Preseason ==
=== Preseason Big Ten awards and honors ===
Preseason All-B1G Team
Player	No.	Position	Class

=== Coaches poll ===
Coaches' Poll
Predicted finish	Team	Points
1		
2		
3		
4		
5		
6		
7		
8		
9		
10		
11		
12		

== Personnel ==
=== Starters ===
Lineup
Pos.	No.	Player.	Year
C			
1B			
2B			
3B			
SS			
LF			
CF			
RF			
DH			

Weekend pitching rotation
Day	No.	Player.	Year
Friday	#33	Cade Obermuller	Jr.
Saturday	#18	Aaron Savary	Jr.
Sunday	#5	Reece Beuter	RS Sr.

=== Roster ===
2025 Iowa Hawkeyes baseball team
Players	Coaches
# / Pos. / Name / B/T / Height / Weight / Year / Home town	Head coach Rick Heller Assistant coach(es) Marty Sutherland; Mitchell Boe; Nic Ungs Legend: (C) Team captain; (S) Suspended; (I) Ineligible; Injured; Current redshirt; Roster; Last update: January 13, 2025

=== Coaching staff ===
2025 Iowa Hawkeyes baseball coaching staff
Name	Position	Seasons at Iowa	Alma mater
Rick Heller	Head coach	12	Upper Iowa University (1986)
Marty Sutherland	Associate Head Coach	12	University of Northern Iowa (2002)
Sean McGrath	Pitching Coach	3	Lafayette College (2012)
Mitch Boe	Assistant Coach	3	University of Iowa (2019)
Nic Ungs	Director of Operations	7	University of Northern Iowa (2001)
Jake Feldman	Athletic Trainer	5	Valparaiso University (2018)

== Offseason ==
=== Departures ===
Iowa Departures
Name	Number	Pos.	Height	Weight	Year	Hometown	Notes

=== Transfers ===
Incoming transfers
Name	Number	Pos.	Height	Weight	Year	Hometown	Previous School

=== 2024 MLB draft ===
Round	Pick	Player	Position	MLB Club

== Game log ==
2025 Iowa Hawkeyes baseball game log (Overall: 33–22–1; Conference: 21–9); (Home: 16–7; Away: 14–7; Neutral: 3–8–1)
Regular season (32–20–1)
February (3–5)
(Away: 2–2; Neutral: 1–3)

Date Time	Opponent	Rank	TV	Venue	Score	Win	Loss	Save	Attendance	Overall record	B1G record

March (14–4)
(Home: 11–1; Away: 2–2; Neutral: 1–1)

Date Time	Opponent	Rank	TV	Venue	Score	Win	Loss	Save	Attendance	Overall record	B1G record

April (14–4)
(Home: 5–3; Away: 9–1)

Date Time	Opponent	Rank	TV	Venue	Score	Win	Loss	Save	Attendance	Overall record	B1G record

May (1–7–1)
(Home: 0–3; Away: 1–2; Neutral: 0–2–1)

Date Time	Opponent	Rank	TV	Venue	Score	Win	Loss	Save	Attendance	Overall record	B1G record

Postseason (1–2)
Big Ten Tournament (1–2)

Date Time	Opponent	Rank	TV	Venue	Score	Win	Loss	Save	Overall record	Tournament record
May 21	(10) Rutgers		BTN	Charles Schwab Field • Omaha, Nebraska	**W** 4-3	**Obermueller** (5-3)	Shadek (4-5)	**Hogue** (2)	33-20-1	1-0
May 22	(6) Indiana		BTN	Charles Schwab Field • Omaha	**L** 0-5	Gilley (10-3)	**DeTaeye** (0-5)	Grable (2)	33-21-1	1-1
May 24 6pm CDT	(2) UCLA	#13	BTN	Charles Schwab Field • Omaha	**L** 3-9	Barnett (11-1)	**Savary** (7-2)	None	33-22-1	1-2

"#" represents ranking. All rankings from D1 Baseball Poll on the date of the contest.
"()" represents postseason seeding in the Big 10 Tournament or NCAA Regional, respectively.
= Win, = Loss, = Canceled/Postponed
Bold = **Iowa Hawkeyes team member**
* = Non-Conference Game
Schedule Source:

Schedule Notes

== Rankings ==
Ranking movements
	Week																		
Poll	Pre	1	2	3	4	5	6	7	8	9	10	11	12	13	14	15	16	17	Final
Coaches'		*																	
Baseball America																			
NCBWA†																			

† NCBWA ranks 30 teams in their preseason poll, but only ranks 25 teams weekly during the season.
* A new poll was not released for this week, so for comparison purposes, the previous week's ranking is inserted in this week's slot.
