= 2025 Indiana Hoosiers baseball team =

American college baseball season

2025 Indiana Hoosiers baseball
- Conference: Big Ten Conference
- Record: 32–24 (16–14 Big Ten)
- Head coach: Jeff Mercer (7th season)
- Hitting coach: Zach Weatherford (2nd season)
- Pitching coach: Dustin Glant (4th season)
- Home stadium: Bart Kaufman Field (Capacity: 2,500)

2025 Big Ten Conference baseball standings
	Conf.						Overall
Team	W		L		T	PCT	W		L		T	PCT
No. 5 Oregon ‍†‍‍^{y}	22	–	8	–	0	.733	42	–	16	–	0	.724
No. 13 UCLA ‍†‍‍^{y}	22	–	8	–	0	.733	48	–	16	–	0	.750
Iowa ‍‍‍	21	–	9	–	0	.700	33	–	22	–	1	.598
USC ‍‍‍^{y}	18	–	12	–	0	.600	37	–	23	–	0	.617
Washington ‍‍‍	17	–	13	–	0	.567	29	–	28	–	0	.509
Indiana ‍‍‍	16	–	14	–	0	.533	32	–	24	–	0	.571
Michigan ‍‍‍	16	–	14	–	0	.533	33	–	23	–	0	.589
Nebraska ‍‍‡‍^{y}	15	–	15	–	0	.500	33	–	29	–	0	.532
Penn State ‍‍‍	15	–	15	–	0	.500	33	–	23	–	0	.589
Rutgers ‍‍‍	15	–	15	–	0	.500	29	–	28	–	0	.509
Illinois ‍‍‍	14	–	16	–	0	.467	30	–	24	–	0	.556
Michigan State ‍‍‍	13	–	17	–	0	.433	28	–	27	–	0	.509
Northwestern ‍‍‍	13	–	17	–	0	.433	25	–	27	–	0	.481
Maryland ‍‍‍	12	–	18	–	0	.400	27	–	29	–	0	.482
Purdue ‍‍‍	11	–	19	–	0	.367	31	–	23	–	0	.574
Minnesota ‍‍‍	10	–	20	–	0	.333	24	–	28	–	0	.462
Ohio State ‍‍‍	5	–	25	–	0	.167	13	–	37	–	0	.260
† – Conference champion ‡ – Tournament champion y – Invited to the NCAA tournament As of June 2, 2025; Rankings from D1Baseball

The 2025 Indiana Hoosiers baseball team was a college baseball team that represented Indiana University in the 2025 NCAA Division I baseball season. The Hoosiers were a member of the Big Ten Conference, played their home games at Bart Kaufman Field in Bloomington, Indiana, and were led by seventh-year head coach Jeff Mercer.

== Previous season ==
The Hoosiers finished the 2024 NCAA Division I baseball season 33-26-1 (15-9 conference) good for 3rd place in the Big Ten standings. As the No. 3 seed in the Big Ten tournament, they would beat No. 6 Purdue in the first round, No. 7 Ohio State in the second round, but would lose to No. 2 Nebraska in the semifinals. As the No. 3 seed in NCAA Tournament, they would beat No. 2 seed Southern Miss, but would lose to the No. 1 seed Tennessee and No. 2 Southern Miss ending their season.

== Roster ==
2025 Indiana Hoosiers baseball team
Players
Coaches

#	Pos.	Name	B/T	Height	Weight	Year	Previous school	Home town
2	INF	Jasen Oliver	R/R	5 ft 11 in (1.8 m)	185 lb (84 kg)	So	Orchard Lake St. Mary's Prep	Almont, MI
3	OF	Tyler DeMartino	R/R	6 ft 0 in (1.83 m)	205 lb (93 kg)	Gr	Walt Whitman HS	Potomac, MD
5	OF	Devin Taylor	L/R	6 ft 1 in (1.85 m)	215 lb (98 kg)	RS Jr	LaSalle HS	Cincinnati, OH
6	C	T.J. Schuyler	R/R	6 ft 2 in (1.88 m)	220 lb (100 kg)	So	Antioch HS	Antioch, IL
8	INF	Tyler Cerny	R/R	6 ft 2 in (1.88 m)	205 lb (93 kg)	Jr	Center Grove HS	Greenwood, IN
9	C	Jake Stadler	L/R	6 ft 1 in (1.85 m)	215 lb (98 kg)	RS Sr	Mount Vernon HS	Greenfield, IN
10	INF	Josh Pyne	R/R	6 ft 0 in (1.83 m)	195 lb (88 kg)	Sr	Linton-Stockton HS	Bloomfield, IN
11	INF	Will Moore	L/R	5 ft 9 in (1.75 m)	170 lb (77 kg)	Fr	Paris HS	Paris, ON
12	C	Hogan Denny	R/R	6 ft 0 in (1.83 m)	205 lb (93 kg)	Fr	Mooresville HS	Mooresville, IN
13	OF	Andrew Wiggins	L/R	6 ft 4 in (1.93 m)	225 lb (102 kg)	So	Heritage Christian	Indianapolis, IN
14	LHP	Braylon Thomas	L/L	6 ft 5 in (1.96 m)	220 lb (100 kg)	Fr	Bishop Dwenger HS	Fort Wayne, IN
15	INF	Cooper Malamazian	R/R	6 ft 2 in (1.88 m)	185 lb (84 kg)	Fr	Nazareth Academy	Clarendon Hills, IN
16	LHP	Anthony Gubitosi	L/L	5 ft 11 in (1.8 m)	192 lb (87 kg)	Jr	Colts Neck HS	Freehold, NJ
17	RHP	Ben Grable	R/R	6 ft 4 in (1.93 m)	215 lb (98 kg)	Gr	Flintridge Prep	Pasadena, CA
18	LHP	Grant Holderfield	L/L	6 ft 3 in (1.91 m)	220 lb (100 kg)	RS Jr	Oak Park and River Forest HS	Oak Park, IL
19	OF	Cole Decker	L/R	5 ft 11 in (1.8 m)	185 lb (84 kg)	Fr	Evansville North HS	Evansville, IN
20	OF	Korbyn Dickerson	R/R	6 ft 1 in (1.85 m)	205 lb (93 kg)	RS So	Trinity HS	Jeffersonville, IN
21	RHP	Jacob Vogel	R/R	6 ft 7 in (2.01 m)	250 lb (113 kg)	RS So	Jennings County HS	North Vernon, IN
23	INF	Joey Brenczewski	S/R	6 ft 3 in (1.91 m)	195 lb (88 kg)	RS So	Fishers HS	Fishers, IN
24	RHP	Drew Buhr	L/R	6 ft 1 in (1.85 m)	205 lb (93 kg)	Gr	Austin HS	Austin, IN
26	RHP	Seth Benes	R/R	6 ft 2 in (1.88 m)	210 lb (95 kg)	So	Liberty HS	O'Fallon, MO
27	RHP	Clayton Weisheit	R/R	6 ft 6 in (1.98 m)	235 lb (107 kg)	So	Forest Park HS	Jasper, IN
28	LHP	Matthew Bohnert	L/L	5 ft 8 in (1.73 m)	187 lb (85 kg)	RS Sr	Cactus Shadows HS	Cave Creek, AZ
29	LHP	Ryan Kraft	L/L	6 ft 4 in (1.93 m)	220 lb (100 kg)	Sr	Lincoln-Way Central HS	Mokena, IL
30	LHP	Ryan Rushing	L/L	5 ft 10 in (1.78 m)	190 lb (86 kg)	So	IMG Academy	Bradenton, FL
31	RHP	Henry Brummel	R/R	6 ft 4 in (1.93 m)	215 lb (98 kg)	Fr	Pontiac Township HS	Pontiac, IL
32	RHP	Cole Gilley	R/R	6 ft 1 in (1.85 m)	205 lb (93 kg)	RS Sr	Columbus East HS	Columbus, IN
33	RHP	Trey Telfer	R/R	6 ft 1 in (1.85 m)	185 lb (84 kg)	Fr	Cathedral Catholic HS	San Diego, CA
34	INF	Jake Hanley	L/R	6 ft 6 in (1.98 m)	241 lb (109 kg)	Fr	Mason HS	Mason, OH
35	RHP	Evan O'Neill	R/R	6 ft 4 in (1.93 m)	223 lb (101 kg)	RS Fr	Blessed Trinity Catholic HS	Alpharetta, GA
36	RHP	Micah Vessely	R/R	6 ft 1 in (1.85 m)	185 lb (84 kg)	Fr	Greenwood HS	Greenwood, IN
37	OF	Ryan Gilbert	R/R	6 ft 5 in (1.96 m)	235 lb (107 kg)	RS So	Kenston HS	Cleveland, OH
38	RHP	Jackson Yarberry	R/R	6 ft 3 in (1.91 m)	215 lb (98 kg)	So	Timberland HS	Lake St. Louis, MO
39	RHP	Michael Lorenzetti	R/R	6 ft 8 in (2.03 m)	225 lb (102 kg)	RS Jr	Taft School	Bristol, CT
40	RHP	Gavin Seebold	R/R	6 ft 2 in (1.88 m)	205 lb (93 kg)	RS Sr	Jeffersonville HS	Jeffersonville, IN
41	LHP	Deron Swanson	L/L	6 ft 3 in (1.91 m)	195 lb (88 kg)	Sr	Snider HS	Fort Wayne, IN
42	C	Brayden Ricketts	L/R	6 ft 2 in (1.88 m)	205 lb (93 kg)	Fr	Jean Augustine Secondary	Brampton, ON
43	INF	Caleb Koskie	R/L	6 ft 0 in (1.83 m)	185 lb (84 kg)	Fr	Benilde-St. Margaret's	Excelsior, MN
44	RHP	Will Eldridge	R/R	6 ft 4 in (1.93 m)	210 lb (95 kg)	Jr	Carroll HS	Flora, IN
51	RHP	Pete Haas	R/R	6 ft 0 in (1.83 m)	195 lb (88 kg)	RS Jr	Keene HS	Hancock, NH
55	RHP	Aydan Decker-Petty	R/R	6 ft 5 in (1.96 m)	230 lb (104 kg)	Jr	New Castle HS	New Castle, IN

Head coach

Jeff Mercer

Assistant coach(es)

Dustin Glant
Zach Weatherford
Blake Allen
Denton Sagerman

Legend

- (C) Team captain
- (S) Suspended
- (I) Ineligible
- Injured
- Current redshirt

Roster
Last update: January 22nd, 2025

== Schedule and results ==
2025 Indiana Hoosiers baseball game log
Regular season (2–4)
February (2–4)

#	Date Time (EST)	Opponent	Rank	Venue	Score	Attendance	Overall record	B1G record

March (0–0)

#	Date Time (EST)	Opponent	Rank	Venue	Score	Attendance	Overall record	B1G record

April (0-0)

#	Date Time (EST)	Opponent	Rank	Venue	Score	Attendance	Overall record	B1G record

May (0-0)

#	Date Time (EST)	Opponent	Rank	Venue	Score	Attendance	Overall record	B1G record

Schedule Source
"#" represents ranking. All rankings from D1 Baseball on the date of the contest.
"()" represents postseason seeding in the Big 10 Tournament or NCAA Regional, respectively.

== Ranking movements ==
Ranking movements Legend: ██ Increase in ranking ██ Decrease in ranking — = Not ranked RV = Received votes
	Week																			
Poll	Pre	1	2	3	4	5	6	7	8	9	10	11	12	13	14	15	16	17	18	Final
Coaches'	RV	RV*	—	—	—	—	—	—	—	—	—	—	—	—	—	—				
Baseball America	25	25	—	—	—	—	—	—	—	—	—	—	—	—	—	—				
NCBWA†	25	RV	RV	—	—	—	—	—	—	—	—	—	—	—	—	—				
D1Baseball	—	—	—	—	—	—	—	—	—	—	—	—	—	—	—	—				

† NCBWA ranks 30 teams in their preseason poll, but only ranks 25 teams weekly during the season.
* A new poll was not released for this week, so for comparison purposes, the previous week's ranking is inserted in this week's slot.
