= 2025 Oregon Ducks baseball team =

American college baseball season

2025 Oregon Ducks baseball

Big Ten Conference regular season co-champions

Eugene Regional, 0–2
- Conference: Big Ten Conference

Ranking
- Coaches: No. 7
- D1Baseball.com: No. 5
- Record: 42–16 (22–8 Big Ten)
- Head coach: Mark Wasikowski (6th season)
- Assistant coach: Marcus Hinkle (6th season)
- Hitting coach: Jack Marder (6th Season)
- Pitching coach: Blake Hawksworth (2nd season)
- Home stadium: PK Park

2025 Big Ten Conference baseball standings
| | Conf. | | | | | | Overall |
| Team | W | | L | | T | PCT | W | | L | | T | PCT |
|---|---|---|---|---|---|---|---|---|---|---|---|---|
| No. 5 Oregon ‍†‍‍^{y} | 22 | – | 8 | – | 0 | .733 | 42 | – | 16 | – | 0 | .724 |
| No. 13 UCLA ‍†‍‍^{y} | 22 | – | 8 | – | 0 | .733 | 48 | – | 16 | – | 0 | .750 |
| Iowa ‍‍‍ | 21 | – | 9 | – | 0 | .700 | 33 | – | 22 | – | 1 | .598 |
| USC ‍‍‍^{y} | 18 | – | 12 | – | 0 | .600 | 37 | – | 23 | – | 0 | .617 |
| Washington ‍‍‍ | 17 | – | 13 | – | 0 | .567 | 29 | – | 28 | – | 0 | .509 |
| Indiana ‍‍‍ | 16 | – | 14 | – | 0 | .533 | 32 | – | 24 | – | 0 | .571 |
| Michigan ‍‍‍ | 16 | – | 14 | – | 0 | .533 | 33 | – | 23 | – | 0 | .589 |
| Nebraska ‍‍‡‍^{y} | 15 | – | 15 | – | 0 | .500 | 33 | – | 29 | – | 0 | .532 |
| Penn State ‍‍‍ | 15 | – | 15 | – | 0 | .500 | 33 | – | 23 | – | 0 | .589 |
| Rutgers ‍‍‍ | 15 | – | 15 | – | 0 | .500 | 29 | – | 28 | – | 0 | .509 |
| Illinois ‍‍‍ | 14 | – | 16 | – | 0 | .467 | 30 | – | 24 | – | 0 | .556 |
| Michigan State ‍‍‍ | 13 | – | 17 | – | 0 | .433 | 28 | – | 27 | – | 0 | .509 |
| Northwestern ‍‍‍ | 13 | – | 17 | – | 0 | .433 | 25 | – | 27 | – | 0 | .481 |
| Maryland ‍‍‍ | 12 | – | 18 | – | 0 | .400 | 27 | – | 29 | – | 0 | .482 |
| Purdue ‍‍‍ | 11 | – | 19 | – | 0 | .367 | 31 | – | 23 | – | 0 | .574 |
| Minnesota ‍‍‍ | 10 | – | 20 | – | 0 | .333 | 24 | – | 28 | – | 0 | .462 |
| Ohio State ‍‍‍ | 5 | – | 25 | – | 0 | .167 | 13 | – | 37 | – | 0 | .260 |
† – Conference champion ‡ – Tournament champion y – Invited to the NCAA tournament As of June 2, 2025; Rankings from D1Baseball

The 2025 Oregon Ducks baseball team represents the University of Oregon in the 2025 NCAA Division I baseball season. The Ducks play their home games at PK Park in Eugene, Oregon and are members of the Big Ten Conference in their first season, after spending the last 59 years in the Pac-12 Conference. The team is coached by Mark Wasikowski in his 6th season at Oregon.

== Previous season ==
The Ducks ended the 2024 season with a record of 19–11 in conference play and 37–18 overall record good for 3rd place in the Pac-12. They would play in the Pac-12 tournament as the #3 Seed on Pool C in Game 1 they would lose to Utah and then in Game 2 would lose to the #4 seed USC. They would be invited to play in the 2024 NCAA Division I baseball tournament, The Ducks earned the No. 2 seed in the Santa Barbara Regional, where they swept three games (defeating San Diego and UC Santa Barbara twice). They moved on to the Bryan-College Station Super Regional against Texas A&M.

== Roster ==
2025 Oregon Ducks roster
| Pitchers: 1 - Tyler Jones - Freshman; 10 - Collin Clarke - Sophomore; 15 - Jaxon Jordon - Senior; 16 - Cole Fisher - Junior; 21 - Michael Meckna - Freshman; 22 - Julien Hernandez - Senior; 23 - Kellan Knox - Freshman; 28 - Will Sanford - Freshman; 31 - Seth Mattox - Senior; 33 - Jason Reitz - Junior; 38 - Gabe Howard - Freshman; 41 - Tanner Bradley - Freshman; 46 - Ryan Featherston - Sophomore; 51 - Nate Christman - Freshman; 52 - Alex Umland - Freshman; 53 - Isaac Evaniew - Junior; 55 - Cole Stokes - Sophomore; 2 - Grayson Grinsell - Junior; 4 - Toby Twist - Sophomore; 7 - Hunter Hyatt - R-Freshman; 24 - Ian Umlandt - Junior; 34 - Santiago Garcia - Sophomore; 37 - Sam Boyle - Junior; 50 - Blake Crawford - Freshman | Catchers: 5 - Burke-Lee Mabeus - Freshman; 13 - Coen Niclai - Freshman; 27 - Chase Meggers - Junior; 66 - Zach Justics - R-Freshman; 77 - Anson Aroz - Junior; Infielders: 3 - Carter Garate - Junior; 9 - Maddox Molony - Sophomore; 12 - Ryan Cooney - Sophomore; 17 - Drew Smith - Junior; 45 - Dominic Hellman - Junior; 25 - Jacob Walsh - Senior; 40 - Kayle Pisano - Freshman | Outfielders: 35 - Jeffery Heard - Senior | Two Way Players: 6 - Jack Brooks - Sophomore; 19 - Jax Gimenez - Freshman |

=== Coaches ===
2025 Oregon Ducks baseball coaching staff
- Mark Wasikowski – Head coach – 6th season
- Blake Hawksworth – Assistant coach – 2nd season
- Jake Marder – Assistant coach – 6th season
- Marcus Hinkle – Assistant coach – 6th season

Note: Season counter accounts for all stints at Oregon.

== Personnel ==
=== Starters ===
Opening Night Lineup
| Pos. | No. | Player. | Year |
|---|---|---|---|
| CF | | | |
| DH | | | |
| 1B | | | |
| C | | | |
| RF | | | |
| SS | | | |
| LF | | | |
| 2B | | | |
| 3B | | | |

Weekend pitching rotation
| Day | No. | Player. | Year |
|---|---|---|---|
| Friday | | | |
| Saturday | | | |
| Sunday | | | |

== Schedule and results ==
2025 Oregon Ducks baseball game log (42–16)
Regular season (41–13)
(Home; 28–6; Away: 13–7)
February (7–2)
(Home; 7–2; Away: 0–0)

| Date Time | Opponent | Rank | TV | Venue | Score | Win | Loss | Save | Attendance | Overall record | B1G record |

March (13–5)
(Home; 10–3; Away: 3–2)

| Date Time | Opponent | Rank | TV | Venue | Score | Win | Loss | Save | Attendance | Overall record | B1G record |

April (11–5)
(Home; 7–3; Away: 4–2)

| Date Time | Opponent | Rank | TV | Venue | Score | Win | Loss | Save | Attendance | Overall record | B1G record |

May (10–1)
(Home; 5–0; Away: 5–1)

| Date Time | Opponent | Rank | TV | Venue | Score | Win | Loss | Save | Attendance | Overall record | B1G record |

Postseason (1–3)
Big Ten Tournament (1–1)

| Date Time | Opponent | Rank | TV | Venue | Score | Win | Loss | Attendance | Overall record | Tournament record |
|---|---|---|---|---|---|---|---|---|---|---|
| May 22nd 3:00 p.m. | vs (12) Michigan State | (1) No. 4 | BTN | Charles Schwab Field • Omaha, Nebraska | **W** 4–2 | **Garcia** (3–0) | Horvath (3–3) | **Maddox** (1) | 42–13 | 1–0 |
| May 24th 7:00 a.m. | vs (18) Nebraska | (1) No. 4 | BTN | Charles Schwab Field | **L** 3–7 | Brockett (4–3) | **Grinsell** (9–3) | Walsh (1) | 42–14 | 1–1 |

Eugene Regional (0–2)

| Date Time | Opponent | Rank | TV | Venue | Score | Win | Loss | Save | Attendance | Overall record | NCAAT record |
|---|---|---|---|---|---|---|---|---|---|---|---|
| May 30th 6:00 p.m. | vs (4) Utah Valley | (1) No. 12 | ESPNU | PK Park | **L** 5–6 | Herman (5–3) | **Reitz** (5–1) | Littledike (1) | 4,293 | 42–15 | 0–1 |
| May 31st 12:00 p.m. | vs (3) Cal Poly | (1) No. 12 | ESPN+ | PK Park | **L** 8–10 | Torres (5–4) | **Umlandt** (6–2) | — | 2,609 | 42–16 | 0–2 |

"#" represents ranking. All rankings from D1 Baseball Poll on the date of the contest.
"()" represents postseason seeding in the Big 10 Tournament or NCAA Regional, respectively.
= Win, = Loss, = Canceled/Postponed
Bold = **Oregon Ducks team member**
* = Non-Conference Game
Schedule Source:

== Rankings ==
Ranking movements Legend: ██ Increase in ranking ██ Decrease in ranking т = Tied with team above or below ( ) = First-place votes
| | Week | | | | | | | | | | | | | | | | |
| Poll | Pre | 1 | 2 | 3 | 4 | 5 | 6 | 7 | 8 | 9 | 10 | 11 | 12 | 13 | 14 | 15 | Final |
|---|---|---|---|---|---|---|---|---|---|---|---|---|---|---|---|---|---|
| Coaches' | 14 | 14* | 15 | 13 | 10 | 9т | 10 | 12 | 17 | 18 | 16 | 10 | 7 | 7 (1) | 5 (1) | 7 | |
| Baseball America | 19 | 19 | 19 | 15 | 12 | 13 | 11 | 21 | 23 | 25 | 20 | 12 | 10 | 9 | 6 | 6* | |
| NCBWA† | 12 | 11 | 12 | 14 | 12 | 11 | 10 | 15 | 15 | 17 | 21 | 19 | 10 | 7 | 6 | 6 | |
| D1Baseball | 12 | 11 | 11 | 10 | 9 | 9 | 10 | 15 | 15 | 16 | 13 | 6 | 5 | 5 | 4 | 5 | |
| Perfect Game | 14 | 14 | 15 | 14 | 11 | 14 | 10 | 15 | 17 | 17 | 13 | 6 | 6 | 3 | 2 | 2* | |

† NCBWA ranks 30 teams in their preseason poll, but only ranks 25 teams weekly during the season.
* A new poll was not released for this week, so for comparison purposes, the previous week's ranking is inserted in this week's slot.
