= Indiana Hoosiers baseball statistical leaders =

The Indiana Hoosiers baseball statistical leaders are individual statistical leaders of the Indiana Hoosiers baseball program in various categories, including batting average, home runs, runs batted in, runs, hits, stolen bases, ERA, and Strikeouts. Within those areas, the lists identify single-game, single-season, and career leaders. Single game records from 1989 to present. The Hoosiers represent Indiana University in the NCAA's Big Ten Conference.

Indiana began competing in intercollegiate baseball in 1895. These lists are updated through the end of the 2025 season.

== Batting Average ==
Career 300+ ABs
Rk	Player	AVG	Seasons
1	Alex Smith	.393	1982 1983 1984 1985 1986
2	Mickey Morandini	.392	1985 1986 1987 1988
3	Robert Waite	.388	1981 1982
4	Alex Dickerson	.386	2009 2010 2011
5	Don Foreman	.381	1958 1959 1960
6	Mike Smith	.369	1989 1990 1991 1992
7	Geoff Flinn	.366	1987 1988 1989
8	Vasili Spanos	.365	2000 2001 2002 2003
9	William Jordan	.364	1986 1987 1988 1989
10	Kevin Orie	.358	1991 1992 1993

Season
Rk	Player	AVG	Season
1	Mike Smith	.490	1992
2	Josh Phegley	.438	2008
3	Bob Waite	.437	1981
4	John Wehner	.436	1988
5	Alex Smith	.434	1985
6	Jeff Howard	.432	1988
7	Mike Smith	.431	1991
8	Barry Burnett	.427	1973
9	Dan Winters	.426	1984
10	Mike Crotty	.423	1995

== Home Runs ==
Career
Rk	Player	HR	Seasons
1	Devin Taylor	54	2023 2024 2025
2	Alex Dickerson	47	2009 2010 2011
3	Mike Smith	47	1989 1990 1991 1992
	Mike Sabo	47	1985 1986 1987 1988
5	Vasili Spanos	43	2000 2001 2002 2003
	Alex Smith	43	1982 1983 1984 1985 1986
7	Carter Mathison	42	2022 2023 2024
8	Kyle Schwarber	40	2012 2013 2014
9	Matt Lloyd	37	2017 2018 2019
	Logan Sowers	37	2015 2016 2017 2018
	Mickey Morandini	37	1985 1986 1987 1988

Season
Rk	Player	HR	Season
1	Mike Smith	27	1992
2	Alex Dickerson	24	2010
3	Bill Mueller	23	1985
4	Kevin Orie	20	1992
	Devin Taylor	20	2024
6	Korbyn Dickerson	19	2025
7	Carter Mathison	19	2022
	Craig Dedelow	19	2017
	Doug DeVore	19	1999
10	Matthew Ellis	18	2022
	Kyle Schwarber	18	2013
	Alex Smith	18	1986
	Devin Taylor	18	2025

Single Game
Rk	Player	HR	Season	Opponent
1	Byron Bradley	4	1992	Tri-State

== Runs Batted In ==
Career
Rk	Player	RBI	Seasons
1	Mike Sabo	231	1985 1986 1987 1988
2	Alex Smith	223	1982 1983 1984 1985 1986
3	Mickey Morandini	186	1985 1986 1987 1988
4	Vasili Spanos	185	2000 2001 2002 2003
	Mike Smith	185	1989 1990 1991 1992
6	Alex Dickerson	181	2009 2010 2011
7	Devin Taylor	179	2023 2024 2025
8	Phil Dauphin	178	1988 1989 1990
9	Matt Braughler	175	1993 1994 1995 1996
10	Bill Mueller	170	1982 1983 1984 1985

Season
Rk	Player	RBI	Season
1	Mike Smith	95	1992
2	Bill Mueller	87	1985
3	Alex Smith	81	1986
4	Josh Phegley	80	2008
5	Korbyn Dickerson	77	2025
6	Alex Dickerson	75	2010
7	Brock Tibbitts	68	2023
	Phil Dauphin	68	1989
9	Mike Sabo	67	1988
	Alex Smith	67	1985

Single Game
Rk	Player	RBI	Season	Opponent
1	Mike Smith	9	1992	UW-Milwaukee

== Runs ==
Career
Rk	Player	R	Seasons
1	Mickey Morandini	277	1985 1986 1987 1988
2	Alex Smith	256	1982 1983 1984 1985 1986
3	Mike Sabo	212	1985 1986 1987 1988
4	Kevin Goins	202	1990 1991 1992 1993
	Mike Smith	202	1989 1990 1991 1992
6	Jeff Stout	196	1985 1986 1987 1988
7	Devin Taylor	191	2023 2024 2025
8	Chris Sigler	189	1982 1983 1984 1985
9	Kyle Schwarber	182	2012 2013 2014
	Dan Haegele	182	1998 1999 2000 2001

Season
Rk	Player	R	Season
1	Mickey Morandini	90	1986
2	Mike Smith	79	1992
3	Alex Smith	77	1985
4	Kennard Jones	75	2002
5	Andrew Means	72	2008
6	Jay Brant	71	2005
7	Phillip Glasser	70	2023
	Mickey Morandini	70	1988
9	Josh Phegley	69	2008
10	Alex Smith	67	1986
	Devin Taylor	67	2024

Single Game
Rk	Player	R	Season	Opponent
1	Phillip Glasser	6	2023	Purdue
	Jay Brant	6	2005	Shawnee State
	Brian Harris	6	1997	IU-Southeast

== Hits ==
Career
Rk	Player	H	Seasons
1	Jerrud Sabourin	332	2008 2009 2010 2011
2	Dustin DeMuth	316	2011 2012 2013 2014
3	Alex Smith	305	1982 1983 1984 1985 1986
4	Mickey Morandini	299	1985 1986 1987 1988
5	Mike Smith	270	1989 1990 1991 1992
6	Alex Dickerson	266	2009 2010 2011
7	Mike Sabo	257	1985 1986 1987 1988
8	Kyle Schwarber	238	2012 2013 2014
9	Sam Travis	236	2012 2013 2014
10	Logan Sowers	235	2015 2016 2017 2018

Season
Rk	Player	H	Season
1	Alex Smith	105	1985
2	Alex Dickerson	99	2010
	Mike Smith	99	1992
4	Josh Phegley	98	2008
5	Phillip Glasser	95	2023
	Jerrud Sabourin	95	2010
7	Mike Smith	93	1991
8	Dustin DeMuth	92	2013
	Kennard Jones	92	2002
	Dan Winters	92	1984

Single Game
Rk	Player	H	Season	Opponent
1	21 times	5	Most recent: Devin Taylor, 2025 vs. The Mount	

== Stolen Bases ==
Career
Rk	Player	SB	Seasons
1	Mickey Morandini	127	1985 1986 1987 1988
2	Jeff Stout	105	1985 1986 1987 1988
3	Reggie Watson	90	2003 2004 2005 2006
4	Ryan Dillon	88	1994 1995 1996 1997
	Chris Sigler	88	1982 1983 1984 1985
6	Andrew Means	76	2006 2007 2008
7	Jay Brant	71	2002 2003 2004 2005 2006
8	Dan Haegele	70	1998 1999 2000 2001
9	Brian Harris	67	1996 1997
10	Evan Crawford	63	2007 2008 2009

Season
Rk	Player	SB	Season
1	Brian Harris	50	1997
2	Mickey Morandini	41	1987
3	Jeff Stout	40	1988
4	Reggie Watson	36	2006
	Ryan Dillon	36	1996
6	Mickey Morandini	35	1988
7	Andrew Means	33	2008
	Ryan Dillon	33	1997
	Mickey Morandini	33	1986
10	George Flinn	31	1989

Single Game
Rk	Player	SB	Season	Opponent
1	Micah Johnson	4	2011	Evansville
	Reggie Watson	4	2006	Minnesota
	Reggie Watson	4	2006	Indiana State
	Keith Haas	4	2006	Hartford
	Dan Haegele	4	1999	Iona
	Dan Haegele	4	1998	IUPUI
	Brian Harris	4	1997	IU-Southeast

== Earned Run Average ==
Career (min. 50 innings pitched)
Rk	Player	ERA	Seasons
1	Vernon Wilshere	1.12	1933 1934
2	Robert Marr	1.50	1961
3	Gary Sargent	1.57	1966 1967 1968
4	Don Dunker	1.58	1940 1941
5	Bill Gifford	1.76	1966 1967 1968
6	Chris Kickler	2.00	1992 1993
7	Matt Lloyd	2.12	2017 2018 2019
8	Scott Effross	2.27	2013 2014 2015
9	Aaron Slegers	2.28	2011 2012 2013
10	Bobby Woodward	2.30	1966

Season (min. 50 innings pitched)
Rk	Player	ERA	Season
1	Vernon Wilshere	1.10	1934
2	Gary Sargent	1.20	1967
3	Bob Marr	1.50	1961
4	Erv Inninger	1.53	1965
5	Dave Granger	1.58	1963
6	Gary Sargent	1.68	1968
7	Don Dunker	1.80	1941
8	Joey DeNato	1.82	2014
9	Will Coursen-Carr	1.93	2013
10	Gary Sargent	1.97	1966

== Strikeouts ==
Career
Rk	Player	K	Seasons
1	Joey DeNato	297	2011 2012 2013 2014
2	Pauly Milto	258	2016 2017 2018 2019
3	Matt Bashore	244	2007 2008 2009
	Eric Jaques	244	1986 1987 1988 1989
5	Ty Bothwell	240	2020 2021 2022 2023 2024
6	Kyle Hart	237	2012 2013 2014 2015 2016
7	Brian Partenheimer	235	1994 1995 1996 1997
8	Bob Scafa	229	1991 1992 1993 1994
9	Claron Veller	204	1929 1930 1931
10	Scott Mudd	200	1992 1993 1994 1995

Season
Rk	Player	K	Season
1	Luke Sinnard	114	2023
2	Eric Arnett	109	2009
	Vernon Wilshere	109	1934
4	Matt Bashore	108	2009
5	Claron Veller	107	1931
6	Dan Ferrell	104	1996
7	Pauly Milto	100	2019
8	Andrew Saalfrank	98	2019
9	McCade Brown	97	2021
	Jonathan Stiever	97	2018

Single Game
Rk	Player	K	Season	Opponent
1	McCade Brown	16	2021	Penn State
	Brad Edwards	16	2000	Quinnipiac
3	Jason Torres	15	1999	Princeton
4	Zach McClellan	14	2000	Vermont
	Andrew Saalfrank	14	2019	Evansville
	Andrew Saalfrank	14	2019	Canisius
7	Ty Bothwell	13	2024	Minnesota
	Andrew Saalfrank	13	2019	Penn State
	Luke Sinnard	13	2023	Morehead State
