= Big Ten Conference Baseball Player of the Year =

Baseball award

Big Ten Conference Player of the Year
- Awarded for: the most outstanding baseball player in the Big Ten Conference
- Country: United States
- First award: 1982
- Currently held by: Roch Cholowsky, UCLA

The Big Ten Conference Player of the Year is a baseball award given to the Big Ten Conference's most outstanding player. The award was first given following the 1982 season, with both pitchers and position players eligible. After the 1994 season, the Big Ten Conference Baseball Pitcher of the Year award was created to honor the most outstanding pitcher.

== Key ==
*	Awarded a College National Player of the Year award: the Dick Howser Trophy or the Golden Spikes Award
†	Major League Baseball All-Star
‡	Member of the National Baseball Hall of Fame

== Winners ==
Season	Player	School	Position	Reference
1982	Jim Paciorek	Michigan	OF	
1983	Terry Steinbach†	Minnesota	3B	
1983	Rich Stoll	Michigan	P	
1984	Barry Larkin‡	Michigan	SS	
1985	Barry Larkin‡ (2)	Michigan	SS	
1986	Casey Close	Michigan	OF	
1987	Darrin Fletcher†	Illinois	C	
1988	Jim Abbott	Michigan	P	
1989	Bubba Smith	Illinois	1B/P	
1990	Mark Dalesandro	Illinois	IF/C	
1991	Brent Gates	Minnesota	SS	
1992	Brett Backlund	Iowa	P	
1992	Mike Smith	Indiana	SS	
1993	Mark Loretta†	Northwestern	SS	
1994	Mark Merila	Minnesota	2B	
1994	Jonathan Sweet	Ohio State	C	
1995	Shane Gunderson	Minnesota	C	
1995	Scott Weaver	Michigan	OF	
1996	Josh Klimek	Illinois	SS	
1997	Dan Seimetz	Ohio State	1B	
1998	D.J. Svihlik	Illinois	2B	
1999	Robb Quinlan	Minnesota	1B	
2000	Mike Campo	Penn State	OF	
2001	Jack Hannahan	Minnesota	3B	
2002	Luke Appert	Minnesota	2B	
2002	Kennard Jones	Indiana	OF	
2002	Bob Malek	Michigan State	OF	
2003	Luke Appert (2)	Minnesota	2B	
2004	Steve Caravati	Ohio State	OF	
2005	Drew Davidson	Illinois	OF	
2006	Ronnie Bourquin	Ohio State	3B	
2007	Lars Davis	Illinois	C	
2008	Nate Recknagel	Michigan	1B	
2009	Dan Burkhart	Ohio State	C	
2010	Alex Dickerson	Indiana	OF	
2011	Jeff Holm	Michigan State	1B	
2012	Kevin Plawecki	Purdue	C	
2013	Justin Parr	Illinois	OF	
2014	Sam Travis	Indiana	1B	
2015	David Kerian	Illinois	1B	
2016	Matt Fiedler	Minnesota	OF	
2017	Jake Adams	Iowa	OF	
2018	Bren Spillane	Illinois	1B/OF	
2019	Jordan Brewer	Michigan	OF	
2021	Spencer Schwellenbach	Nebraska	SS/P	
2022	Chris Alleyne	Maryland	OF	
2023	Matt Shaw	Maryland	SS	
2024	Josh Kuroda-Grauer	Rutgers	SS	
2025	Roch Cholowsky	UCLA	SS	
2026	Roch Cholowsky (2)	UCLA	SS	

== Winners by school ==
School (year joined)	Winners	Years
Illinois (1896)	10	1987, 1989, 1990, 1996, 1998, 2005, 2007, 2013, 2015, 2018
Michigan (1896)	9	1982, 1983, 1984, 1985, 1986, 1988, 1995, 2008, 2019
Minnesota (1896)	9	1983, 1991, 1994, 1995, 1999, 2001, 2002, 2003, 2016
Ohio State (1912)	5	1994, 1997, 2004, 2006, 2009
Indiana (1900)	4	1992, 2002, 2010, 2014
Michigan State (1953)	2	2002, 2011
Iowa (1900)	2	1992, 2017
Maryland (2014)	2	2022, 2023
UCLA (2024)	2	2025, 2026
Nebraska (2011)	1	2021
Northwestern (1896)	1	1993
Penn State (1993)	1	2000
Purdue (1896)	1	2012
Rutgers (2014)	1	2024
Oregon (2024)	0	—
USC (2024)	0	—
Washington (2024)	0	—
Wisconsin (1896)^{a}	0	—

== Footnotes ==
- ^{a} Wisconsin discontinued its baseball program after the 1991 season.
