= Big Ten Conference Baseball Pitcher of the Year =

Big Ten Conference Pitcher of the Year
- Awarded for: the most outstanding baseball pitcher in the Big Ten Conference
- Country: United States
- First award: 1982
- Currently held by: Mason Edwards, USC

The Big Ten Conference Pitcher of the Year is a baseball award given to the Big Ten Conference's most outstanding pitcher. The award was first given following the 1994 season.

== Key ==
| * | Awarded a College National Player of the Year award: the Dick Howser Trophy or the Golden Spikes Award |
| † | Major League Baseball Player |
| ‡ | Major League Baseball All-Star |

== Winners ==
| Season | Player | School | Reference |
|---|---|---|---|
| 1994 | Matt Beaumont | Ohio State | |
| 1995 | Chad Schroeder | Northwestern | |
| 1996 | Nate Bump† | Penn State | |
| 1997 | Justin Fry | Ohio State | |
| 1998 | James Tow | Illinois | |
| 1999 | Justin Fry (2) | Ohio State | |
| 2000 | Jason Anderson† | Illinois | |
| 2001 | Andy Dickinson | Illinois | |
| 2002 | C.J. Woodrow | Minnesota | |
| 2003 | Scott Lewis† | Ohio State | |
| 2004 | Glen Perkins‡ | Minnesota | |
| 2005 | Jim Brauer | Michigan | |
| 2006 | Dan Brauer | Northwestern | |
| 2007 | Cory Luebke† | Ohio State | |
| 2008 | Zach Putnam† | Michigan | |
| 2009 | Eric Arnett | Indiana | |
| 2009 | Alex Wimmers | Ohio State | |
| 2010 | Alex Wimmers† (2) | Ohio State | |
| 2011 | Kurt Wunderlich | Michigan State | |
| 2012 | Joe Haase | Purdue | |
| 2013 | Aaron Slegers† | Indiana | |
| 2014 | Joey DeNato | Indiana | |
| 2015 | Tyler Jay† | Illinois | |
| 2016 | Cody Sedlock | Illinois | |
| 2017 | Brian Shaffer | Maryland | |
| 2018 | Patrick Fredrickson | Minnesota | |
| 2019 | Andrew Saalfrank† | Indiana | |
| 2021 | Trenton Wallace | Iowa | |
| 2022 | Adam Mazur† | Iowa | |
| 2023 | Connor O'Halloran | Michigan | |
| 2024 | Brett Sears | Nebraska | |
| 2025 | Joseph Dzierwa | Michigan State | |
| 2026 | Mason Edwards | USC | |

== Winners by school ==
| School (year joined) | Winners | Years |
|---|---|---|
| Ohio State (1912) | 7 | 1994, 1997, 1999, 2003, 2007, 2009, 2010 |
| Illinois (1896) | 5 | 1998, 2000, 2001, 2015, 2016 |
| Indiana (1900) | 4 | 2009, 2013, 2014, 2019 |
| Michigan (1896) | 3 | 2005, 2008, 2023 |
| Minnesota (1896) | 3 | 2002, 2004, 2018 |
| Iowa (1900) | 2 | 2021, 2022 |
| Michigan State (1953) | 2 | 2011, 2025 |
| Northwestern (1896) | 2 | 1995, 2006 |
| Maryland (2014) | 1 | 2017 |
| Nebraska (2011) | 1 | 2024 |
| Penn State (1993) | 1 | 2000 |
| Purdue (1896) | 1 | 2012 |
| USC (2024) | 1 | 2026 |
| Rutgers (2014) | 0 | — |
| Oregon (2024) | 0 | — |
| UCLA (2024) | 0 | — |
| Washington (2024) | 0 | — |
| Wisconsin (1896)^{a} | 0 | — |

== Footnotes ==
- ^{a} Wisconsin discontinued its baseball program after the 1991 season.
