= Mason Edwards =

American baseball player (born 2005)

Athletics
- Pitcher
- Born: July 14, 2005 (age 21); Santa Monica, California, U.S.
- Bats: Left Throws: Left

Career highlights and awards
- Big Ten Pitcher of the Year (2026)

Mason James Edwards (born July 14, 2005) is an American professional baseball pitcher in the Athletics organization.

== Career ==
Edwards attended Palisades Charter High School in Pacific Palisades, Los Angeles, California. As a senior, he had a 1.15 earned run average (ERA) with 103 strikeouts over 55 innings. He committed to the University of Southern California (USC) to play college baseball.

As a freshman for the USC Trojans, he appeared in 20 games with four starts and went 1–3 with a 7.88 ERA and 52 strikeouts. After the season he played summer ball for the Bend Elks of the West Coast League. As a sophomore, he pitched in 12 games with five starts and went 3–0 with a 3.86 ERA and 46 strikeouts.

Edwards became the Trojans number one starter in 2026. During the season, he set the Big Ten record for most strikeouts in conference games during a season.

Edwards is a top prospect for the 2026 MLB draft.
