= 2015 Big Ten baseball tournament =

2015 Big Ten Conference baseball tournament
- Teams: 8
- Format: Double-elimination
- Finals site: Target Field; Minneapolis, MN
- Champions: Michigan (9th title)
- Winning coach: Erik Bakich (1st title)
- MVP: Jacob Cronenworth (Michigan)
- Television: BTN

2015 Big Ten Conference baseball standings
	Conf.						Overall
Team	W		L		T	PCT	W		L		T	PCT
No. 9 Illinois ‍†‍‍^{y}	21	–	1	–	0	.955	50	–	10	–	1	.828
No. 20 Iowa ‍‍‍^{y}	19	–	5	–	0	.792	41	–	18	–	0	.695
No. 14 Maryland ‍‍‍^{y}	14	–	10	–	0	.583	42	–	24	–	0	.636
Michigan ‍‍‡‍^{y}	14	–	10	–	0	.583	39	–	25	–	0	.609
Michigan State ‍‍‍	14	–	10	–	0	.583	34	–	23	–	0	.596
Indiana ‍‍‍^{y}	12	–	10	–	0	.545	35	–	24	–	0	.593
Ohio State ‍‍‍	13	–	11	–	0	.542	35	–	21	–	0	.625
Nebraska ‍‍‍	9	–	14	–	0	.391	34	–	23	–	0	.596
Minnesota ‍‍‍	9	–	15	–	0	.375	21	–	30	–	0	.412
Northwestern ‍‍‍	8	–	16	–	0	.333	18	–	36	–	0	.333
Rutgers ‍‍‍	7	–	17	–	0	.292	19	–	35	–	1	.355
Penn State ‍‍‍	6	–	16	–	0	.273	18	–	30	–	0	.375
Purdue ‍‍‍	6	–	17	–	0	.261	20	–	34	–	0	.370
† – Conference champion ‡ – Tournament champion y – Invited to the NCAA tournament As of June 8, 2015; Rankings from Collegiate Baseball

The 2015 Big Ten Conference baseball tournament was held at Target Field in Minneapolis, Minnesota, from May 20 through 24. Michigan won their 9th tournament championship to claim the Big Ten Conference's automatic bid to the 2015 NCAA Division I baseball tournament. The event was aired on the Big Ten Network.

== Format and seeding ==
The 2015 tournament was an 8 team double-elimination tournament. The top eight teams based on conference regular season winning percentage earned invites to the tournament. The teams played a double-elimination tournament leading to a single championship game.

Team	W	L	Pct	GB	Seed
Illinois	21	1	.955	–	1
Iowa	19	5	.792	3	2
Michigan	14	10	.583	8	3
Maryland	14	10	.583	8	4
Michigan State	14	10	.583	8	5
Indiana	12	10	.545	9	6
Ohio State	13	11	.542	9	7
Nebraska	9	14	.391	12.5	8
Minnesota	9	15	.375	13	–
Northwestern	8	16	.333	14	–
Rutgers	7	17	.292	15	–
Penn State	6	16	.273	15	–
Purdue	6	17	.261	15.5	–

== Tournament ==
First round
1	Illinois	3
8	Nebraska	2
4	Maryland	2
5	Michigan State	1
8	Nebraska	7
5	Michigan State	9
2	Iowa	3
7	Ohio State	2
3	Michigan	4
6	Indiana	1
7	Ohio State	3
6	Indiana	5

Second round
1	Illinois	1
4	Maryland	2
5	Michigan State	0
1	Illinois	2
2	Iowa	5
3	Michigan	8
6	Indiana	10
2	Iowa	2

Semifinals
4	Maryland	4	–
6	Indiana	2	–
3	Michigan	5	-
1	Illinois	3	-

Final
4	Maryland	3
3	Michigan	4
