= Bob Morgan (baseball) =

Biographical details
- Born: 1947 (age 78–79)

Playing career
- 1966–1969: Ohio
- 1970: DeLand Sun Caps
- 1971: Lakeland Tigers
- Position: Pitcher

Coaching career (HC unless noted)
- 1976–1981: Wooster
- 1982–1983: Kent State
- 1984–2005: Indiana

Head coaching record
- Overall: 1074-583–6
- Tournaments: B1G: 6–9; NCAA: 10-10

Accomplishments and honors

Championships
- Big Ten Tournament (1996)

Awards
- Big Ten Coach of the Year (1991,1993) NCAA Midwest Coach of the Year[1976]

Records
- Ohio Conference Coach of the Year- [1977,1978,1980.]

Robert G. Morgan (born 1947) is an American former baseball player and coach. As a player at Ohio University (Athens, OH) he was 22-1 in his collegiate history as a pitcher. Robert was then drafted out of Ohio University to the Detroit Tigers. He served as the head baseball coach at the College of Wooster from 1976 to 1981, Kent State University from 1982 to 1983, and Indiana University Bloomington from 1984 to 2005, compiling a career college baseball coaching record of 1074-583-6. Morgan played Minor League Baseball in the Detroit Tigers organization.

== Head coaching record ==
Record table
| Season | Team | Overall | Conference | Standing | Postseason |
|---|---|---|---|---|---|
Wooster Fighting Scots (Ohio Athletic Conference) (1976–1981)
| 1976 | Wooster | 30–9 | 12–5 | | |
| 1977 | Wooster | 31–6 | 12–1 | 1st (Northern) | NCAA Regional |
| 1978 | Wooster | 30–10 | 9–3 | | NCAA Regional |
| 1979 | Wooster | 40–8–1 | 10–2 | 1st (Northern) | NCAA Regional |
| 1980 | Wooster | 45–7 | 12–2 | 1st (Northern) | NCAA Regional |
| 1981 | Wooster | 37–8–1 | 12–2–1 | 1st (Northern) | NCAA Regional |
| Wooster: | | 213–48–2 | 67–15–1 | | |
Kent State Golden Flashes (Mid-American Conference) (1982–1983)
| 1982 | Kent State | 35–23 | 8–8 | 3rd (Eastern) | |
| 1983 | Kent State | 44–16 | 6–9 | 4th (Eastern) | |
| Kent State: | | 79–39 | 14–17 | | |
Indiana Hoosiers (Big Ten Conference) (1984–2005)
| 1984 | Indiana | 44–20 | 6–9 | 4th (East) | |
| 1985 | Indiana | 57–19–1 | 8–8 | T-2nd (East) | |
| 1986 | Indiana | 43–17 | 7–9 | 3rd (East) | |
| 1987 | Indiana | 43–17 | 7–9 | 3rd (East) | |
| 1988 | Indiana | 39–19 | 11–17 | 8th | |
| 1989 | Indiana | 34–26 | 5–23 | 10th | |
| 1990 | Indiana | 30–27–1 | 14–14–1 | T-5th | |
| 1991 | Indiana | 38–23–1 | 15–12 | T-3rd | Big Ten tournament |
| 1992 | Indiana | 35–20 | 14–14 | 5th | |
| 1993 | Indiana | 38–21 | 15–12 | 4th | Big Ten tournament |
| 1994 | Indiana | 33–23 | 12–16 | T-7th | |
| 1995 | Indiana | 33–23 | 12–16 | T-8th | |
| 1996 | Indiana | 43–18 | 18–8 | 2nd | Midwest Regional |
| 1997 | Indiana | 33–22 | 8–16 | 8th | |
| 1998 | Indiana | 29–27 | 14–14 | 5th | |
| 1999 | Indiana | 37–17 | 14–14 | 5th | |
| 2000 | Indiana | 29–27 | 9–19 | 10th | |
| 2001 | Indiana | 24–31–1 | 7–19 | 10th | |
| 2002 | Indiana | 35–20 | 15–14 | 4th | Big Ten tournament |
| 2003 | Indiana | 34–22 | 16–15 | 6th | Big Ten tournament |
| 2004 | Indiana | 25–30 | 9–22 | 10th | |
| 2005 | Indiana | 26–30 | 9–23 | 10th | |
| Indiana: | | 782–504–4 | 245–323–1 | | |
| Total: | | 1074–583–1 | | | |
National champion Postseason invitational champion Conference regular season champion Conference regular season and conference tournament champion Division regular season champion Division regular season and conference tournament champion Conference tournament champion

== Bibliography ==
- Career statistics from Baseball Reference (Minors)

Hall of Fame Inductee-Wayne County Sports Hall of Fame, Hancock County Hall of Fame.
