= 2015 Indiana Hoosiers baseball team =

American college baseball season

2015 Indiana Hoosiers baseball

Nashville Regional, L 3–5 vs. Radford
- Conference: Big Ten Conference
- Record: 35–24 (12–10 Big Ten)
- Head coach: Chris Lemonis (1st season)
- Pitching coach: Kyle Bunn (1st season)
- Home stadium: Bart Kaufman Field (Capacity: 2,500)

The 2015 Indiana Hoosiers baseball team is a college baseball team that represented Indiana University in the 2015 NCAA Division I baseball season. The Hoosiers are members of the Big Ten Conference (B1G) and played their home games at Bart Kaufman Field in Bloomington, Indiana. They were led by first-year head coach Chris Lemonis.

Following the conclusion of the regular season, the Hoosiers were selected to play in the 2015 NCAA tournament, beginning in the Nashville Regional. The Hoosiers would eventually lose in the semifinals of the Nashville Regional to Radford by a score of 3–5.

2015 Big Ten Conference baseball standings
	Conf.						Overall
Team	W		L		T	PCT	W		L		T	PCT
No. 9 Illinois ‍†‍‍^{y}	21	–	1	–	0	.955	50	–	10	–	1	.828
No. 20 Iowa ‍‍‍^{y}	19	–	5	–	0	.792	41	–	18	–	0	.695
No. 14 Maryland ‍‍‍^{y}	14	–	10	–	0	.583	42	–	24	–	0	.636
Michigan ‍‍‡‍^{y}	14	–	10	–	0	.583	39	–	25	–	0	.609
Michigan State ‍‍‍	14	–	10	–	0	.583	34	–	23	–	0	.596
Indiana ‍‍‍^{y}	12	–	10	–	0	.545	35	–	24	–	0	.593
Ohio State ‍‍‍	13	–	11	–	0	.542	35	–	21	–	0	.625
Nebraska ‍‍‍	9	–	14	–	0	.391	34	–	23	–	0	.596
Minnesota ‍‍‍	9	–	15	–	0	.375	21	–	30	–	0	.412
Northwestern ‍‍‍	8	–	16	–	0	.333	18	–	36	–	0	.333
Rutgers ‍‍‍	7	–	17	–	0	.292	19	–	35	–	1	.355
Penn State ‍‍‍	6	–	16	–	0	.273	18	–	30	–	0	.375
Purdue ‍‍‍	6	–	17	–	0	.261	20	–	34	–	0	.370
† – Conference champion ‡ – Tournament champion y – Invited to the NCAA tournament As of June 8, 2015; Rankings from Collegiate Baseball

== Nashville Regional ==
Nashville Regional Teams
(1) Vanderbilt Commodores	(2) Radford Highlanders	(3) Indiana Hoosiers	(4) Lipscomb Bisons

First round
1	Vanderbilt	9
4	Lipscomb	1
3	Indiana	7
2	Radford	1
Lower round 1
4	Lipscomb	2
2	Radford	5

Regional semifinals
1	Vanderbilt	6
3	Indiana	4
Lower final
3	Indiana	3
2	Radford	5

Regional final
1	Vanderbilt
2	Radford

- Nashville Regional Scores Source

== Roster ==
2014 Indiana Hoosiers roster
Pitchers: 8 Bell, Evan - Junior; 17 Eldred, CJ - Freshman; 21 Williams, Kent - Sophomore; 14 Hart, Kyle - Junior; 21 Morris, Christian - Junior; 23 DeNato, Joey - Senior; 24 Stadler, Sullivan - Junior; 26 Moody, Nick - Freshman; 27 Korte, Brian - Senior; 28 Harrison, Luke - Senior; 34 Halstead, Ryan - Senior; 35 Coursen-Carr, Will - Junior; 37 Effross, Scott - Junior; 43 Belcher, Thomas - Sophomore; 44 Kelzer, Jacob - Sophomore; 33 Foote, Austin - Freshman; 30 Hobbie, Brian - Freshman; 45 Baragar, Caleb - Junior	Catchers: 25 Hartong, Brad - Senior; 7 Webb, Demetrius - Freshman; Infielders: 1 Ramos, Nick - Junior; 40 Flood, Brendan - Freshman; 9 Rodrigue, Casey - Senior; 29 Goldaris, Eli - Senior; 18 Cangelosi, Austin - Sophomore; 13 Clark, Chad - Junior; 40 Wilhite, Brian - Junior; 6 Pasteur, Isaiah - Freshman; 13 Holdsworth, Macy - Freshman; 36 Stratten, Colby - Freshman; 27 Hooker, Austin - Freshman	Outfielders: 4 Sujka, Chris - Senior; 11 Nolden, Will - Senior; 32 Cureton, Luke - Freshman; 24 Stadler, Sullivan - Sophomore; 36 O'Conner, Tim - Junior; 19 Alfonso, Ricky - Senior; 39 Dedelow, Craig - Sophomore; 2 Sowers, Logan - Freshman; 3 Donley, Scott - Senior; 10 Crisler, Larry - Freshman; 23 Eustace, Laren - Freshman; 26 Lowe, Chris - Freshman; 40 Flood, Brendan - Freshman
