= Cody Sedlock =

American baseball player (born 1995)

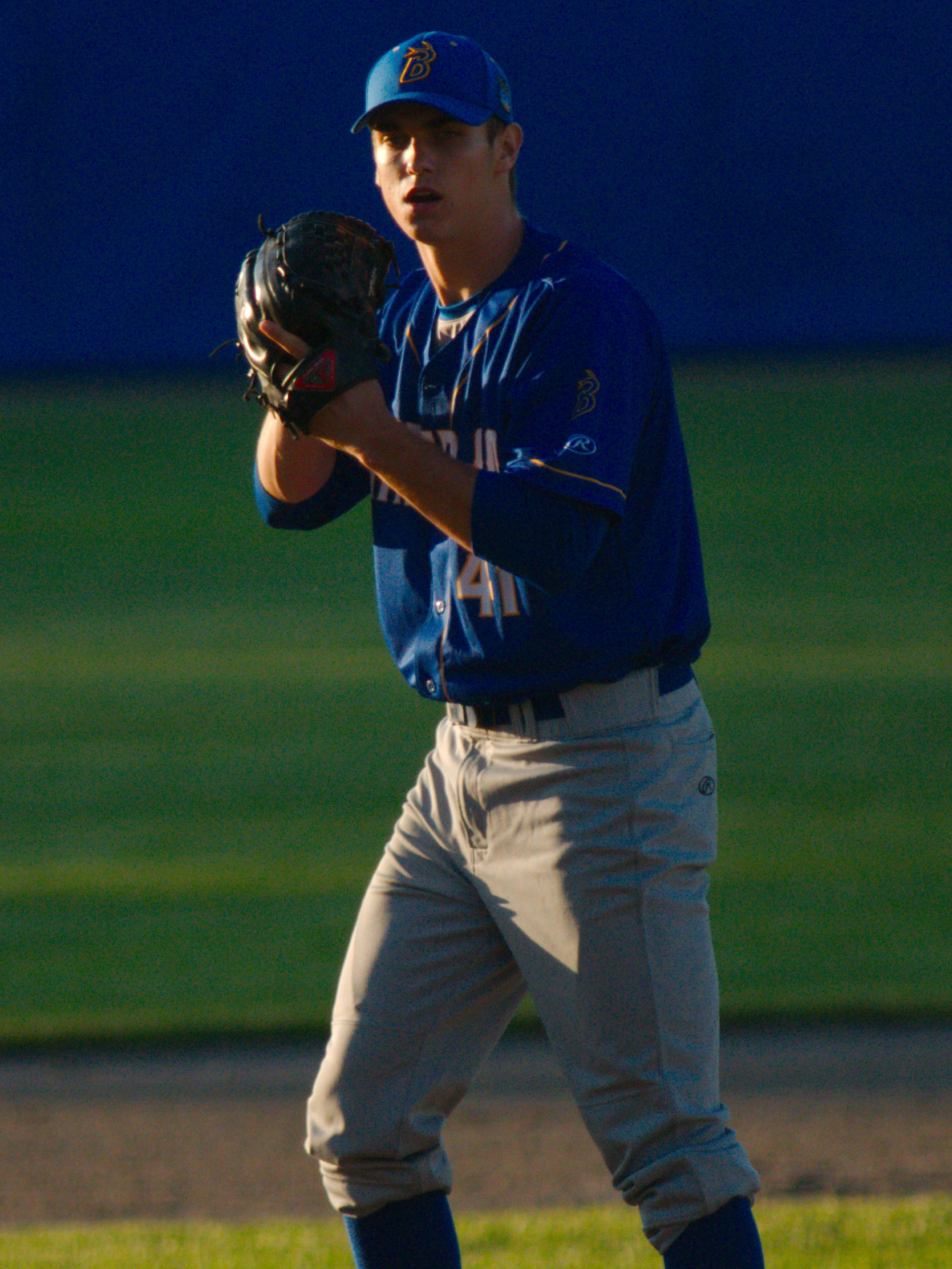
- Sedlock with the Waterloo Bucks in 2014
- Pitcher
- Born: June 19, 1995 (age 31); Sherrard, Illinois, U.S.
- Batted: Right Threw: Right

MLB debut
- May 29, 2022, for the Baltimore Orioles

Last MLB appearance
- May 29, 2022, for the Baltimore Orioles

MLB statistics
- Win–loss record: 0–0
- Earned run average: 15.00
- Strikeouts: 3
- Stats at Baseball Reference

Teams
- Baltimore Orioles (2022)

Cody Austin Sedlock (born June 19, 1995) is an American former professional baseball pitcher. He played one game in Major League Baseball (MLB) for the Baltimore Orioles in 2022.

== Amateur career ==
Sedlock attended Alleman High School in Rock Island, Illinois, and the University of Illinois, where he played college baseball for the Illinois Fighting Illini. As a freshman in 2014 he appeared in 12 games with three starts. He was 1–3 with a 3.41 earned run average (ERA) and 30 strikeouts. As a sophomore in 2015, he appeared in 21 games with two starts and went 4–0 with a 4.02 ERA and 29 strikeouts. After the 2015 season, he played collegiate summer baseball with the Bourne Braves of the Cape Cod Baseball League.

As a junior in 2016, Sedlock became a full-time starting pitcher. That year he was named the Big Ten Pitcher of the Year. During the season, he broke Illinois' single season strikeout record, previously held by John Ericks since 1988.

== Professional career ==
=== Baltimore Orioles ===
The Baltimore Orioles drafted Sedlock in the first round, with the 27th overall selection, of the 2016 Major League Baseball draft. He made his professional debut that year with the Low-A Aberdeen IronBirds where he posted a 0–1 record with a 3.00 ERA in nine starts. In 2017, he played for the High-A Frederick Keys where he went 4–5 with a 5.90 ERA in 20 starts. Sedlock missed part of the 2017 season dealing with a strained flexor mass in his elbow area. In 2018, Sedlock split the year between the Gulf Coast Orioles, Aberdeen, and Frederick, combining to go 0–3 with a 5.11 ERA in 36 1/3 innings. Sedlock missed time in 2018 while dealing with the effects of Thoracic outlet syndrome, though he ultimately avoided surgery for the ailment. Sedlock opened the 2019 season back with Frederick, before being promoted to the Double-A Bowie Baysox in July. Over 22 games (16 starts) between the two clubs, he went 5-3 with a 2.84 ERA, striking out 100 batters over 95 innings.

Sedlock did not play in a game in 2020 due to the cancellation of the minor league season because of the COVID-19 pandemic. He returned to action in 2021, making 24 appearances (16 starts) between Bowie and the Triple-A Norfolk Tides and registering a combined 6-6 record and 4.55 ERA with 100 strikeouts in 93 innings pitched. He was assigned to Triple-A Norfolk to begin the 2022 season.

On May 28, 2022, Baltimore selected Sedlock's contract and promoted him to the major leagues for the first time. In his debut, Sedlock worked three innings of relief against the Boston Red Sox, allowing 5 runs on 6 hits and 1 walk with 3 strikeouts. Sedlock was designated for assignment on June 7, following the waiver claim of Austin Voth. He cleared waivers and was sent outright to Triple-A Norfolk on June 10.

=== Detroit Tigers ===
On July 10, 2022, Sedlock was traded to the Detroit Tigers in exchange for cash considerations and was assigned to the Triple-A Toledo Mud Hens. Sedlock made 14 appearances for Toledo, recording a 3.51 ERA with 19 strikeouts in 25.2 innings pitched. He elected free agency following the season on November 10.

On March 8, 2023, Sedlock underwent Tommy John surgery.

=== Chicago White Sox ===
On April 15, 2024, Sedlock signed a minor league contract with the Chicago White Sox. In six appearances for the Triple–A Charlotte Knights, he struggled to an 18.00 ERA with 2 strikeouts across 5 innings of work. Sedlock was released by the White Sox organization on July 2.
