= Bren Spillane =

American baseball player (born 1996)

Down East Bird Dawgs – No. 32
- First baseman / Outfielder / Pitcher
- Born: September 21, 1996 (age 29); Hinsdale, Illinois, U.S.
- Bats: Right Throws: Right
- Stats at Baseball Reference

Career highlights and awards
- Collegiate Baseball Player of the Year (2018); Big Ten Player of the Year (2018)

Brenden Patrick Spillane (born September 21, 1996) is an American professional baseball pitcher for the Down East Bird Dawgs of the Frontier League.

== Amateur career ==
Spillane attended Wheeling High School in Wheeling, Illinois. During his high school career he captained the baseball team at Wheeling for three years and hit .429, .512 OBP, 8 HR, 23 RBI, 20 R, 38 SB as a senior. Spillane was named all-conference, all-area, all-state first team, and was drafted by the Pittsburgh Pirates in the 34th round of the 2015 MLB draft, but instead, he committed to the University of Illinois at Urbana Champaign to play college baseball. While in high school, Spillane underwent successful Tommy John surgery. Spillane was ranked 89th nationally and 7th in the State of Illinois by Prep Baseball Report in the 2015 recruiting class.

As a freshman in 2016, he appeared in 5 games with 2 starts. As a sophomore in 2017, Spillane batted .295 with six doubles, a triple, five homers and 23 RBIs in 36 games, missing some time after suffering a concussion. After the season, Spillane played Collegiate summer baseball with the Rockford Rivets of the Northwoods League.

As a junior, Spillane switched from playing the outfield to assume the role of first baseman duties. During his breakout junior season, Spillane was the first player ever to be named the Big Ten Player of the Week for three consecutive weeks and the first Illinois baseball player to be twice named Collegiate Baseball Newspaper's Player of the Week. On April 4, 2018, Spillane was named Midseason Player of the Year and Midseason First Team All-American by Perfect Game/Rawlings College Baseball after batting .494, .579 OBP, 1.149 OPS, 32 Runs, 43 Hits, 13 2B, 1 3B, 14 HR, 38 RBI, and 12 SB as of April 2. On May 22, 2018, Spillane was named First Team All-Big Ten Conference and was also the Big Ten Conference Baseball Player of the Year for 2018. Following the 2018 season, Spillane was named the Collegiate Baseball Player of the Year and was named to the Baseball America and Collegiate Baseball College Baseball All-America Teams. Spillane was one of three position players in the nation named unanimous first team All-Americans, along with Cal's Andrew Vaughn and Texas' Kody Clemens. Spillane led the nation in slugging percentage (.903), OPS (1.401), home runs per game (0.46) and weighted on-base average (.569). Spillane's single-season Illinois ranks included second in slugging (.903), second in home runs (23), second in Big Ten home runs (10), tied for fourth in total bases (158), tied for fourth in Big Ten total bases (67) and fifth in on-base percentage (.498). Spillane was the first player in Big Ten history to win three straight Big Ten Player of the Week awards (March 19 – April 2, 2018) and the first player in Illinois history to win two national player of the week awards.

== Professional career ==
=== Cincinnati Reds ===
On June 5, 2018, Spillane was drafted in the 2018 Major League Baseball draft in the third round (82nd overall) by the Cincinnati Reds. He was the highest drafted position player in University of Illinois baseball history. He signed with the Reds for $597,500 and was assigned to the Billings Mustangs. He spent the whole season there, batting .236 with five home runs and 22 RBI in 48 games.

Spillane spent the 2019 season with the Dayton Dragons, hitting .207 with five home runs and 19 RBI over 62 games. He did not play in a game in 2020 due to the cancellation of the minor league season because of the COVID-19 pandemic. Spillane would return to the Dragons for the 2021 season after the Dragons became the new High-A affiliate of the Reds. During this season he would hit .138 with two home runs and 6 RBI over 12 games.

Spillane was released by the Reds organization on April 1, 2022.

=== Windy City ThunderBolts ===
On May 11, 2022, Spillane signed with the Windy City ThunderBolts of the Frontier League. In 51 games, he hit .232/.321/.503 with 12 home runs and 40 RBI.

In 2023, Spillane played in 83 games for the ThunderBolts, batting .247/.355/.490 with 16 home runs, 45 RBI, and 27 stolen bases.

On February 2, 2024, Spillane, Jake Boone, and Dan Robinson were traded to the New England Knockouts of the Frontier League in exchange for a player to be named later. Spillane was released prior to the start of the season on April 27.

=== Schaumburg Boomers ===
On March 4, 2025, Spillane signed with the Schaumburg Boomers of the Frontier League. In 36 appearances for the Boomers, he batted .255/.348/.431 with five home runs and 26 RBI.

On December 18, 2025, Spillane re-signed with Schaumburg, and transitioned into a pitcher.

=== Down East Bird Dawgs ===
On July 26, 2026, Spillane signed with the Down East Bird Dawgs of the Frontier League.
