= Devin Taylor (baseball) =

American baseball player (born 2004)

Athletics
- Outfielder
- Born: January 6, 2004 (age 22); Cincinnati, Ohio, U.S.
- Bats: Left Throws: Right
- Stats at Baseball Reference

Devin Jerell Taylor (born January 6, 2004) is an American professional baseball outfielder in the Athletics organization. He played college baseball for the Indiana Hoosiers.

== Amateur career ==
Taylor attended La Salle High School in Cincinnati, Ohio, where he played on the school's baseball team. As a freshman in 2019, he had a .443 batting average with three home runs. Taylor did not play in 2020 due to the COVID-19 pandemic and missed time as a junior in 2021 due to injury, but returned to play as a senior in 2022 and hit .317 with five home runs. He went unselected in the 2022 Major League Baseball draft and enrolled at Indiana University to play college baseball for the Indiana Hoosiers.

As a freshman for Indiana in 2023, Taylor spent the season as Indiana's starting right fielder, also starting four games in left field. He played in 55 games (51 starts) and batted .315 with 16 home runs and 59 runs batted in (RBI). Taylor was named the Big Ten Conference Baseball Freshman of the Year. After the season, Taylor played in the New England Collegiate Baseball League with the Keene Swamp Bats. He hit .314 with eight home runs and 30 RBI and was named the NECBL Rookie of the Year. Over 59 games for Indiana as a sophomore in 2024, Taylor batted .357 with twenty home runs and 54 RBI. After the season, he played in the Cape Cod Baseball League with the Cotuit Kettleers. As a junior at Indiana in 2025, Taylor hit .374 with 18 home runs and 66 RBI over 55 games. He ended the season as Indiana's all-time home run leader with 54. Taylor was named a top prospect for the 2025 MLB draft.

== Professional career ==
Taylor was selected by the Athletics with the 48th overall pick in the 2025 Major League Baseball draft. He signed with the Athletics on July 24 for $2.5 million. After signing, he made his professional debut with the Single-A Stockton Ports. Across 28 games, he hit .264 with six home runs and 18 RBI.

Taylor was assigned to the High-A Lansing Lugnuts to open the 2026 season. He batted .292 with six home runs and 43 RBI across 57 games with Lansing and was promoted to the Double-A Midland RockHounds in June. With Midland, Taylor hit .323 with 14 home runs and 54 RBI over 68 games. On September 1, he was promoted to the Triple-A Las Vegas Aviators. Across 16 games with the Aviators, he batted .295 with three home runs and nine RBI. In total between the three clubs, he hit .308 with 23 home runs, 106 RBI, and 29 doubles across 141 games. Taylor's 167 hits for the season were second most in the minor leagues.
