= Indiana Hoosiers baseball =

- 2027 Indiana Hoosiers baseball team
- Overall record: 2,338-1,802-25 (.564)
- University: Indiana University
- Head coach: Jeff Mercer (8th season)
- Conference: Big Ten
- Location: Bloomington, Indiana
- Home stadium: Bart Kaufman Field (capacity: 2,500)
- Nickname: Hoosiers
- Colors: Crimson and cream

College World Series appearances
- 2013

NCAA regional champions
- 2013

NCAA tournament appearances
- 1996, 2009, 2013, 2014, 2015, 2017, 2018, 2019, 2023, 2024

Conference tournament champions
- 1996, 2009, 2013, 2014

Conference regular season champions
- 1925, 1932, 1938, 1949, 2013, 2014, 2019

The Indiana Hoosiers baseball team is the varsity intercollegiate athletic team of Indiana University in Bloomington, Indiana, United States. The team competes in the National Collegiate Athletic Association's Division I and are members of the Big Ten Conference. The team plays at Bart Kaufman Field, which opened for the 2013 season.

In conference postseason play, Indiana has won four Big Ten Conference baseball tournaments and made eight NCAA Regionals appearances, including one College World Series appearance in 2013. In regular season play, the Hoosiers have won seven Big Ten Conference titles. Coached by Jeff Mercer since 2018, the program has captured seven Big Ten regular-season titles (1925, 1932, 1938, 1949, 2013, 2014, 2019) and four Big Ten tournament championships (1996, 2009, 2013, 2014) .

== History ==
=== Andres, Lawrence, and Smith eras (1949–1983) ===
In 1949, the Hoosiers hired Indiana University alum and former MLB third baseman Ernie Andres to manage the team. Andres would eventually become the longest serving head coach of IU baseball, to date, amassing a 388–367–3 overall record (129–209 conference record) during his 25-year tenure. Andres' Hoosiers would capture one Big Ten conference championship, while also finishing third or better in conference standings three times.

In 1974, Bob Lawrence replaced longtime-tenured coach Ernie Andres. In seven seasons with the Hoosiers, Lawrence compiled a 132–164 overall record (44–71 conference record); Lawrence never led Indiana to a post-season appearance, with his highest conference final standing of third place occurred in 1976.

In 1981, Larry Smith replaced Bob Lawrence as head coach for the Hoosiers. During Smith's three-year tenure at Indiana, he compiled a 74–74–1 overall record (13–30 conference record) and never achieved a post-season appearance.

=== Bob Morgan era (1984–2005) ===
In 1984, Bob Morgan replaced Larry Smith as head coach of the Hoosiers. Morgan would take the Hoosiers to five Big Ten Conference baseball tournaments and one appearance in the NCAA Regionals. Indiana would lose in the opening round of the 1996 NCAA Midwest Regional to Wichita State, 4–0. Morgan would finish his career with Indiana in 2005, with an overall record of 782–499–4 in 21 years of managing the team as the second-longest tenured coach in Hoosiers' history.

=== Tracy Smith era (2006–2014) ===
On June 23, 2005, Indiana replaced long-time coach Bob Morgan with former Miami (OH) head coach Tracy Smith.

On June 9, 2013, the Hoosiers completed a sweep of Florida State in the best of 3 Super Regional to advance to their first College World Series in Omaha, Nebraska. The Hoosiers would eventually lose 1–0 to Oregon State in the second round. Consequently, the 2013 roster would also notably include future-Chicago Cubs player Kyle Schwarber and his eventual selection in the 2014 Major League Baseball draft.

Following the conclusion of the 2014 season, then-head coach Tracy Smith was hired by Arizona State to the same position. In nine years as head coach of the Hoosiers, Smith finished with a 287–237 overall record (127–111 conference record), two Big Ten Baseball Championships and three NCAA Regionals, including one College World Series appearance in 2013.

=== Chris Lemonis era (2015–2018) ===
On July 24, 2014, the Indiana Hoosier's Athletic Department hired former Louisville assistant coach Chris Lemonis to replace Smith as head coach. On June 25, 2018, Mississippi State confirmed that it had hired Lemonis as their new head baseball coach, formally ending Lemonis' tenure with the Hoosiers. Lemonis compiled a 141–91–2 overall record, 55–37-1 conference record and three NCAA tournament appearances, while head coach of the Hoosiers.

=== Jeff Mercer era (since 2019) ===
On July 2, 2018, Indiana University Athletics announced the hiring of former Wright State head coach Jeff Mercer, to the head coaching position for the Hoosiers. Mercer would then make a notable acquisition to the Hoosiers' coaching staff on July 18, 2018, with the hiring of former-MLB All Star third baseman Scott Rolen as Director of Player Development.

On May 18, 2019, the Hoosiers became the 2019 Big Ten regular season champions, following their win over Rutgers by a score of 13–3. Indiana would finish the regular season 36–19 overall and 17–7 in conference play.

Following the culmination of the regular season, on May 21, 2019, Jeff Mercer was named Big Ten Coach of the Year. With the award, Mercer became the third Hoosier manager to be bestowed the honor.

On March 12, 2020, it was announced that the remainder of the 2020 season would be cancelled, due to the COVID-19 virus outbreak.

== Indiana in the NCAA tournament ==
Year	Record	Pct	Notes
1996	1–2	.333	Midwest Regional
2009	0–2	.000	Louisville Regional
2013	6–2	.750	College World Series 5th place, hosted Bloomington Regional
2014	2–2	.500	Hosted Bloomington Regional
2015	1–2	.333	Nashville Regional
2017	1–2	.333	Lexington Regional
2018	2–2	.500	Austin Regional
2019	1–2	.333	Louisville Regional
2023	2–2	.500	Lexington Regional
2024	1–2	.333	Knoxville Regional
TOTALS	17-20	.459	

== Conference affiliations ==
- Independent (1895–1905, 1943)
- Big Ten Conference (1906–1942, 1944–present)
  - Known as the Big Nine Conference from 1906 to 1917

== Home fields ==
=== Jordan Field (1887–1950) ===
Created in 1887, Indiana's first athletic grounds, Jordan Field was originally named University Athletic Field before being renamed in 1898, in honor of then-Indiana University President David Starr Jordan. The field was a mixed-use facility utilized by both the football and baseball teams. Bleacher seating for 4,000 persons were added in 1901, with field drainage added the following year to alleviate flooding.

In 1904, a track and field component was added to the athletic facility; however, conditions of the field continued to be a problem for the Hoosiers. The track and field portion of Jordan Field was upgraded in 1915. The final varsity athletic event for Jordan Field, a baseball game, would occur in 1950 prior to the facility being turned into a parking lot for the nearby Indiana Memorial Union.

=== Sembower Field (1951–2012) ===
Sembower Field was the main baseball stadium utilized by the Hoosiers from 1951 to 2012. It was named after former Indiana baseball player Charles Sembower. The stadium was located just north of the Foster Quadrangle dormitory on Fee Lane, less than 1 mile southeast of the current Hoosier baseball facility: Bart Kaufman Field. The former site of Sembower Field is presently used as a recreational sports complex for university students.

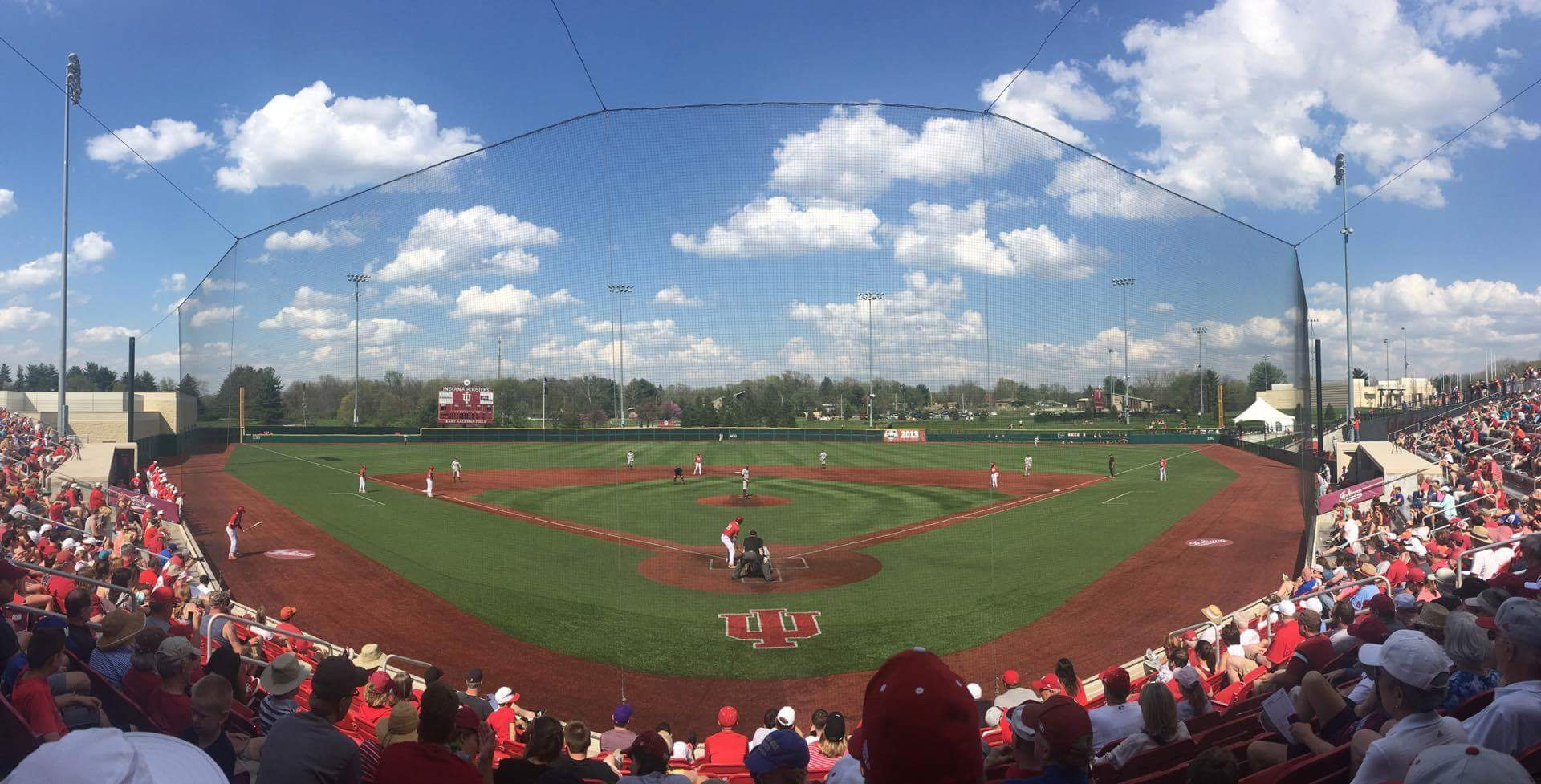
Bart Kaufman Field - 2017

=== Bart Kaufman Field (since 2013) ===
Bart Kaufman Field is the home of the Hoosiers and is located in Bloomington, Indiana, on the campus of Indiana University. Indiana alumnus Bart Kaufman (1960–1962) pledged $2.5 million to start construction on the facility, with the rest of the funding coming from private donations and the university. Construction of Bart Kaufman Field was completed in March 2013 and formally dedicated on April 26. Bart Kaufman Field hosted its first Big Ten baseball tournament from May 24 through 28, 2017.

== Notable players ==
=== Current and former Major League Baseball players ===
- Ernie Andres
- Caleb Baragar (Arizona Diamondbacks)
- Ralph Brickner
- John Corriden
- Doug DeVore
- Alex Dickerson (Atlanta Braves)
- Jake Dunning
- Scott Effross (New York Yankees)
- Sammy Esposito
- Kyle Hart (San Diego Padres)
- Micah Johnson
- Barry Jones
- Ron Keller
- Ted Kluszewski
- Mike Kosman
- Kevin Mahar
- Pinky May
- Zach McClellan
- Bruce Miller
- Mike Modak
- Mickey Morandini
- Kevin Orie
- Chris Peters
- Josh Phegley
- Andrew Saalfrank (Arizona Diamondbacks)
- Kyle Schwarber (Philadelphia Phillies)
- Mike Simon
- Aaron Slegers
- Jonathan Stiever (Chicago White Sox)
- Sam Travis
- Kermit Wahl
- John Wehner
- Bob Wellman
- Whitey Wilshere

=== Major League Baseball All-Stars ===
Year	Name	Position	Team	Notes
1940	Pinky May	3B	Philadelphia Phillies	
1953	Ted Kluszewski	1B	Cincinnati Reds	
1954	Ted Kluszewski	1B	Cincinnati Reds	NL Home Run Leader NL RBI Leader
1955	Ted Kluszewski	1B	Cincinnati Reds	
1956	Ted Kluszewski	1B	Cincinnati Reds	
1995	Mickey Morandini	SS	Philadelphia Phillies	
2021	Kyle Schwarber	OF	Washington Nationals	
2022	Kyle Schwarber	OF	Philadelphia Phillies	

→=== Notable Drafted Players ===

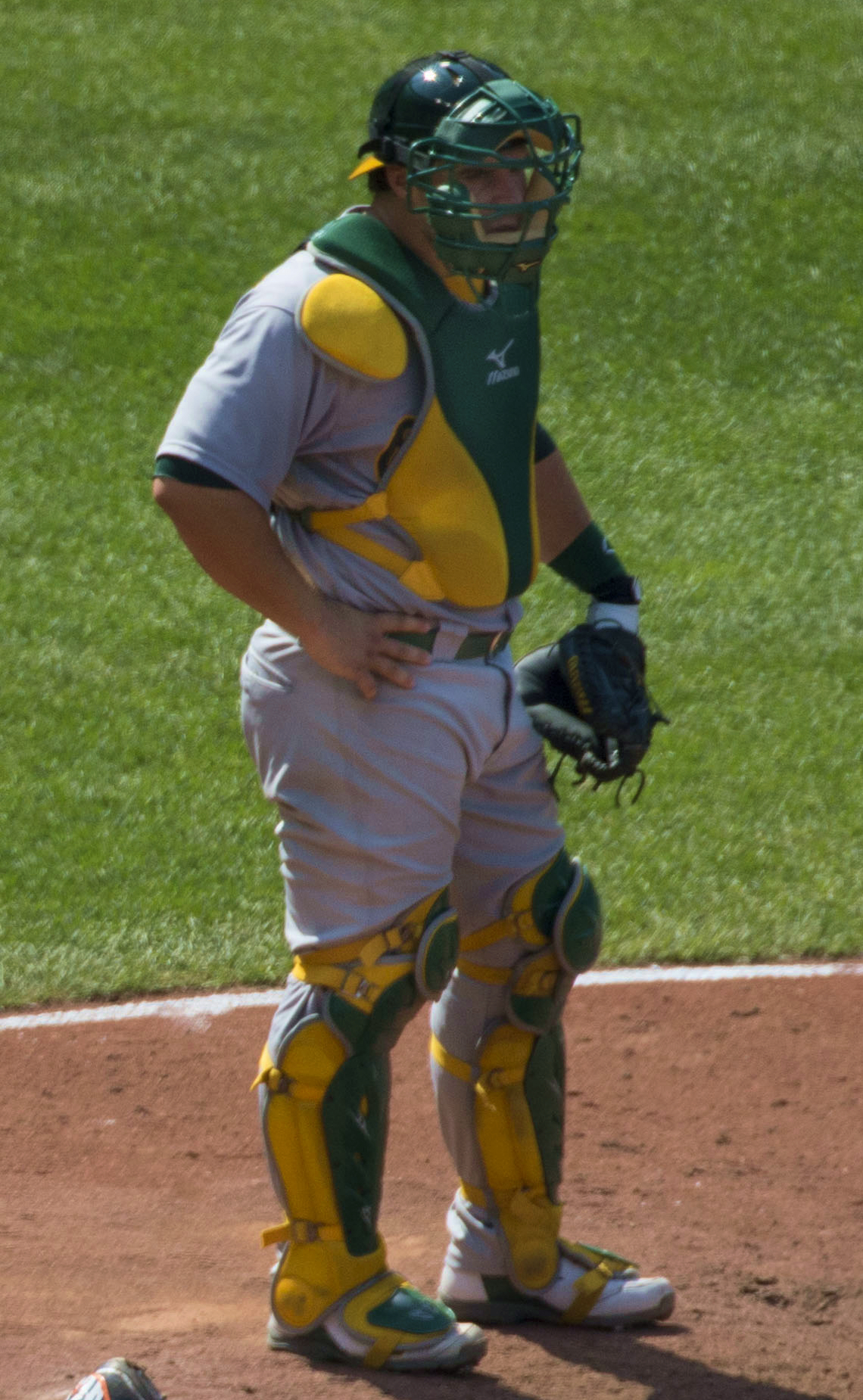
Josh Phegley was drafted in the first round, 38th overall.

Year	Round	Pick	Name	Position	Team
1965	8th	154	Ron Keller	RHP	Minnesota Twins
1970	20th	469	Bruce Miller	SS	Chicago White Sox
1984	3rd	69	Barry Jones	RHP	Pittsburgh Pirates
1988	5th	120	Mickey Morandini	SS	Philadelphia Phillies
1988	7th	174	John Wehner	3B	Pittsburgh Pirates
1993	1st (Comp A)	29	Kevin Orie	SS	Chicago Cubs
1993	37th	1046	Chris Peters	LHP	Pittsburgh Pirates
1999	12th	358	Doug DeVore	OF	Cincinnati Reds
2000	5th	134	Zach McClellan	RHP	Kansas City Royals
2005	19th	591	Brett Sheber	C	Houston Astros
2009	1st (Comp A)	38	Josh Phegley	C	Chicago White Sox
2009	33rd	987	Jake Dunning	RHP	San Francisco Giants
2011	3rd	91	Alex Dickerson	1B	Pittsburgh Pirates
2012	9th	291	Micah Johnson	2B	Chicago White Sox
2013	5th	140	Aaron Slegers	RHP	Minnesota Twins
2014	1st	4	Kyle Schwarber	C	Chicago Cubs
2014	2nd	67	Sam Travis	1B	Boston Red Sox
2015	15th	443	Scott Effross	RHP	Chicago Cubs
2016	19th	568	Kyle Hart	LHP	Boston Red Sox
2016	18th	527	Jake Kelzer	RHP	Philadelphia Phillies
2016	9th	275	Caleb Baragar	LHP	San Francisco Giants
2017	9th	267	Craig Dedelow	OF	Chicago White Sox
2017	31st	916	Luke Miller	3B	Minnesota Twins
2018	5th	138	Jonathan Stiever	RHP	Chicago White Sox
2018	22nd	647	Luke Miller	3B	Philadelphia Phillies
2018	28th	828	Logan Sowers	OF	Chicago White Sox
2018	29th	883	Tim Herrin	LHP	Cleveland Indians
2019	2nd	57	Matt Gorski	OF	Pittsburgh Pirates
2019	6th	182	Andrew Saalfrank	LHP	Arizona Diamondbacks
2019	6th	187	Tanner Gordon	RHP	Atlanta Braves
2019	15th	444	Matt Lloyd	OF	Cincinnati Reds
2019	23rd	680	Pauly Milto	RHP	Chicago White Sox
2019	36th	1077	Scotty Bradley	1B	Toronto Blue Jays
2019	36th	1080	Cam Beauchamp	LHP	Philadelphia Phillies
2019	37th	1116	Cole Barr	3B	Seattle Mariners
2019	40th	1204	Elijah Dunham	OF	Pittsburgh Pirates
2019	40th	1207	Cade Bunnell	2B	Atlanta Braves
2021	3rd	79	McCade Brown	RHP	Colorado Rockies
2021	7th	209	Gabe Bierman	RHP	Miami Marlins
2021	10th	286	Matt Litwicki	RHP	Boston Red Sox
2021	10th	305	Tommy Sommer	LHP	Chicago White Sox
2021	15th	444	Cole Barr	3B	Seattle Mariners
2021	17th	513	Grant Richardson	OF	New York Yankees
2022	5th	154	Jack Perkins	RHP	Oakland Athletics
2022	12th	347	Bradley Brehmer	RHP	Baltimore Orioles
2022	20th	587	Reese Sharp	RHP	Baltimore Orioles

== Year-by-year results ==
Below is a table of the program's yearly records.

Record table
Season	Coach	Overall	Conference	Standing	Postseason
Independent (1895–1905)
1895		11-1			
1896		6-3			
1897		5-3			
1898		3-1			
1899	James Horne	7-6			
1900	James Horne	3-2			
1901	Robert Wicker	3-3			
1902	George Moore	7-14			
1903	Philip O'Neil	6-6			
1904	Philip O'Neil	11-5			
1905	Zora Clevenger	11-11			
Independent:		73-55			
Big Nine/Big Ten (1906–1942)
1906	Zora Clevenger	5-12-1	1-5	t-6th	
1907	Jake Stahl	8-5	2-1	3rd	
1908	Bob Wicker	7-9	2-5	6th	
1909	Skel Roach	10-5	1-5	6th	
1910	Skel Roach	5-3	4-3	3rd	
1911	Skel Roach	6-7	3-3	t-4th	
1912	John J. Corbett	5-9	0-8	7th	
1913	Arthur Berndt	11-4	6-3	3rd	
1914	Arthur Berndt	6-6	4-5	5th	
1915	Arthur Berndt	2-7	1-7	9th	
1916	Frederick Beebe	8-4	4-3	3rd	
1917	Roy Whisman	5-9-1	5-4	3rd	
1918	Guy Rathbun	9-7	0-5	8th	
1919	Harry Scholler	13-9-1	2-5	6th	
1920	Harry Scholler	8-7	3-6	5th	
1921	George Levis	10-14	5-6	5th	
1922	George Levis	1-2	1-2	t-7th	
1923	Roscoe Minton	3-11	2-6	9th	
1924	Roscoe Minton	8-12-1	4-5	7th	
1925	Everett Dean	12-6	9-2	1st	
1926	Everett Dean	6-8-1	3-6	8th	
1927	Everett Dean	8-12-3	4-8	9th	
1928	Everett Dean	10-5	5-4	5th	
1929	Everett Dean	9-7-1	4-6	t-6th	
1930	Everett Dean	9-6	6-4	3rd	
1931	Everett Dean	12-6-1	4-4	7th	
1932	Everett Dean	13-2	6-2	1st	
1933	Everett Dean	16-3	3-2	t-4th	
1934	Everett Dean	19-5-1	6-3	2nd	
1935	Everett Dean	10-9-1	4-6	7th	
1936	Everett Dean	15-7	6-3	4th	
1937	Everett Dean	19-7	8-2	2nd	
1938	Everett Dean	14-7-1	7-3	t-1st	
1939	Paul Harrell	16-4	7-3	2nd	
1940	Paul Harrell	11-8	3-5	t-7th	
1941	Paul Harrell	15-8	7-5	t-4th	
1942	Paul Harrell	12-10	5-7	t-5th	
Independent (1943–1943)
1943	Paul Harrell	4-1			
Big Ten Conference (1944–present)
1944	Paul Harrell	7-13	2-8	9th	
1945	Paul Harrell	12-8-2	5-4	3rd	
1946	Paul Harrell	13-5	5-3	5th	
1947	Paul Harrell	12-7	4-6	7th	
1948	Donald Danielson	15-10	3-9	8th	
1949	Ernie Andres	18-5	8-4	t-1st	
1950	Ernie Andres	11-12	4-4	6th	
1951	Ernie Andres	16-10-1	6-4	3rd	
1952	Ernie Andres	7-19	1-13	10th	
1953	Ernie Andres	4-16	0-11	10th	
1954	Ernie Andres	12-14	4-9	8th	
1955	Ernie Andres	16-11	3-10	t-9th	
1956	Ernie Andres	13-15	5-6	6th	
1957	Ernie Andres	13-15	3-10	10th	
1958	Ernie Andres	17-15	7-8	t-6th	
1959	Ernie Andres	18-13	8-7	t-4th	
1960	Ernie Andres	17-13	5-9	9th	
1961	Ernie Andres	21-5-1	11-3	3rd	
1962	Ernie Andres	16-13	6-8	6th	
1963	Ernie Andres	15-14	4-10	10th	
1964	Ernie Andres	23-12	7-8	t-7th	
1965	Ernie Andres	20-15	6-7	6th	
1966	Ernie Andres	17-15-1	6-5	5th	
1967	Ernie Andres	14-23	6-12	8th	
1968	Ernie Andres	1912	5-8	7th	
1969	Ernie Andres	18-14	10-8	5th	
1970	Ernie Andres	18-23	7-11	8th	
1971	Ernie Andres	14-23	5-11	t-8th	
1972	Ernie Andres	11-24	2-13	10th	
1973	Ernie Andres	20-16	8-10	t-7th	
1974	Bob Lawrence	19-21	9-8	5th	
1975	Bob Lawrence	21-24	7-11	7th	
1976	Bob Lawrence	23-17	10-7	3rd	
1977	Bob Lawrence	21-26	4-14	9th	
1978	Bob Lawrence	20-23	5-8	7th	
1979	Bob Lawrence	11-28	3-13	9th	
1980	Bob Lawrence	17-25	6-10	t-6th	
1981	Larry Smith	23-25-1	5-9	5th (East)	
1982	Larry Smith	25-28	2-14	5th (East)	
1983	Larry Smith	26-21	6-7	3rd (East)	
1984	Bob Morgan	44-20	6-9	4th (East)	
1985	Bob Morgan	57-19-1	8-8	t-2nd (East)	
1986	Bob Morgan	43-17	7-9	t-3rd (East)	
1987	Bob Morgan	43-17	7-9	3rd (East)	
1988	Bob Morgan	39-19	11-17	t-8th	
1989	Bob Morgan	34-26	5-23	10th	
1990	Bob Morgan	30-27-1	14-14	t-5th	
1991	Bob Morgan	38-23-1	15-12	t-3rd	Big Ten tournament
1992	Bob Morgan	35-20	14-14	5th	
1993	Bob Morgan	38-21	15-12	4th	Big Ten tournament
1994	Bob Morgan	33-23	12-16	t-7th	
1995	Bob Morgan	33-23	12-16	t-8th	
1996	Bob Morgan	43-18	18-8	2nd	NCAA Regional
1997	Bob Morgan	33-22	8-16	8th	
1998	Bob Morgan	29-27	14-14	5th	
1999	Bob Morgan	37-17	14-14	5th	
2000	Bob Morgan	29-27	9-19	10th	
2001	Bob Morgan	24-31-1	7-19	10th	
2002	Bob Morgan	35-20	15-14	4th	Big Ten tournament
2003	Bob Morgan	34-22	16-15	6th	Big Ten tournament
2004	Bob Morgan	25-30	9-22	10th	
2005	Bob Morgan	26-30	9-23	10th	
2006	Tracy Smith	22-34	11-21	10th	
2007	Tracy Smith	19-35	8-23	10th	
2008	Tracy Smith	31-30	15-17	6th	Big Ten tournament
2009	Tracy Smith	32-27	16-7	3rd	NCAA Regional
2010	Tracy Smith	28-27	12-12	t-5th	Big Ten tournament
2011	Tracy Smith	30-25	11-13	7th	
2012	Tracy Smith	32-28	16-8	2nd	Big Ten tournament
2013	Tracy Smith	49-16	17-7	1st	College World Series
2014	Tracy Smith	42-13	21-3	1st	NCAA Regional
2015	Chris Lemonis	35-24	12-10	6th	NCAA Regional
2016	Chris Lemonis	32-24	15-9	t-3rd	Big Ten tournament
2017	Chris Lemonis	34-24-2	14-9-1	6th	NCAA Regional
2018	Chris Lemonis	40-19	14-9	5th	NCAA Regional
2019	Jeff Mercer	37-23	17-7	1st	NCAA Regional
2020	Jeff Mercer	9-6	0-0		No postseason due to COVID-19 pandemic
2021	Jeff Mercer	26-18	26-18	t-4th	
2022	Jeff Mercer	27-32	10-14	t-8th	Big Ten tournament
2023	Jeff Mercer	43-20	16-8	2nd	NCAA Regional
2024	Jeff Mercer	33-26-1	15-9	3rd	NCAA Regional
Big Ten:		2,343-1,814-26	850-1,025-1		
Total:		2,420-1,857-26			
National champion Postseason invitational champion Conference regular season champion Conference regular season and conference tournament champion Division regular season champion Division regular season and conference tournament champion Conference tournament champion

== Championships ==
=== Conference Regular season Championships ===
Season	Conference	Coach	Overall	Conference
1925	Big Ten	Everett Dean	12–6	9–2
1932	Big Ten	Everett Dean	13–2	6–2
1938	Big Ten	Everett Dean	14–7–1	7–3
1949	Big Ten	Ernie Andres	18–5	8–4
2013	Big Ten	Tracy Smith	49–16	17–7
2014	Big Ten	Tracy Smith	42–13	21–3
2019	Big Ten	Jeff Mercer	37–23	17–7
Total Regular season Conference Titles			7	

=== Conference Tournament championships ===
Season	Conference	Coach	Winning Team	Losing Team
1996	Big Ten	Bob Morgan	Indiana 6	Illinois 4
2009	Big Ten	Tracy Smith	Indiana 13	Minnesota 2
2013	Big Ten	Tracy Smith	Indiana 4	Nebraska 3
2014	Big Ten	Tracy Smith	Indiana 8	Nebraska 4
Total Conference Tournament championships			4	

== Honors & Awards ==
=== National Awards ===
Sporting News National Player of the Year

- Mike Smith (1992)

NCBWA National Player of the Year

- Mike Smith (1992)

NCAA Triple Crown Winner

- Mike Smith (1992)

ABCA/Rawlings Gold Glove

- Tony Butler, 2B (2016)

NCBWA National Coach of the Year

- Tracy Smith (2013)

=== Conference Awards ===
Big Ten Player of the Year

- Mike Smith (1992)
- Kennard Jones (2002)
- Alex Dickerson (2010)
- Sam Travis (2014)

Big Ten Pitcher of the Year

- Eric Arnett (2009)
- Aaron Slegers (2013)
- Joey DeNato (2014)
- Andrew Saalfrank (2019)

Big Ten Coach of the Year

- Bob Morgan (1991,1993)
- Tracy Smith (2013, 2014)
- Jeff Mercer (2019)

Big Ten Freshman of the Year

- Alex Dickerson (2009)
- Sam Travis (2012)
- Devin Taylor (2023)

=== All-Americans ===
Year	Name	Position	AA Team	Notes
1949	Don Ritter	1B	1st	
1962	Eddie LaDuke	2B	2nd	
1966	Jim DeNeff	SS	2nd	
1974	Ken St. Pierre	C	1st	
1988	Mickey Morandini	SS	2nd	
1992	Mike Smith	SS	1st	National Player of the Year Big Ten Player of the Year
2002	Vasili Spanos	3B	3rd	
2008	Josh Phegley	C	2nd	
2009	Eric Arnett	P	1st	Big Ten Pitcher of the Year
2009	Josh Phegley	C	3rd	
2010	Alex Dickerson	OF	1st	Big Ten Player of the Year
2011	Alex Dickerson	DH	1st	
2013	Kyle Schwarber	C	1st	
2013	Dustin DeMuth	3B	2nd	
2013	Aaron Slegers	P	3rd	Big Ten Pitcher of the Year
2014	Dustin DeMuth	3B	1st	
2014	Kyle Schwarber	C	1st	
2014	Joey DeNato	P	2nd	Big Ten Pitcher of the Year
2014	Sam Travis	1B	2nd	Big Ten Player of the Year
2018	Matt Lloyd	UTIL	2nd	
2019	Andrew Saalfrank	P	2nd	Big Ten Pitcher of the Year
2020	Grant Richardson	OF	3rd	

== See also ==
- Indiana Hoosiers
- List of Indiana University professional athletes
