= Alex Dickerson =

American baseball player (born 1990)

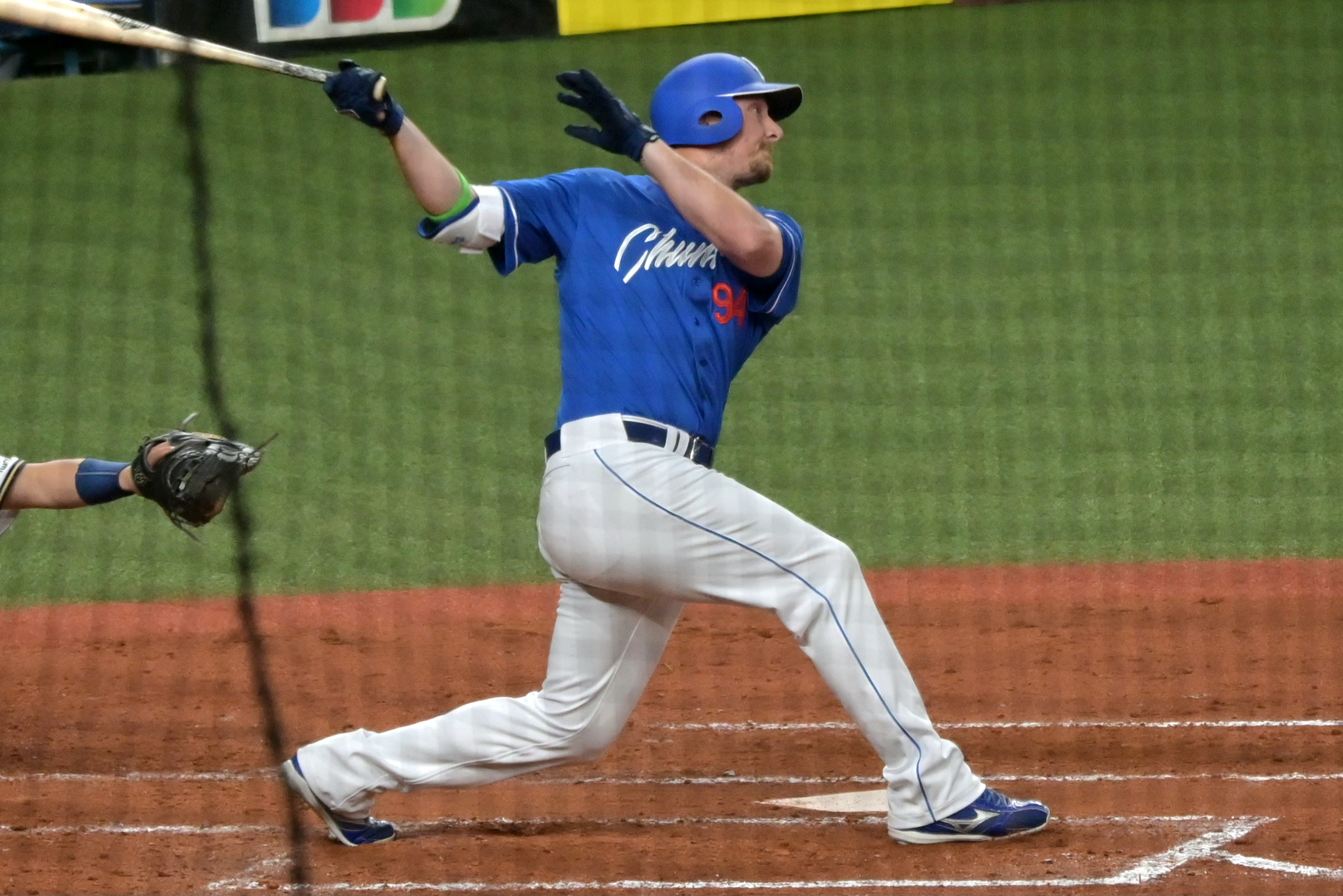
- Dickerson with the Chunichi Dragons in 2024
- Left fielder
- Born: May 26, 1990 (age 36); Poway, California, U.S.
- Batted: Left Threw: Left

Professional debut
- MLB: August 6, 2015, for the San Diego Padres
- NPB: March 29, 2024, for the Chunichi Dragons

Last appearance
- MLB: April 27, 2022, for the Atlanta Braves
- NPB: August 28, 2024, for the Chunichi Dragons

MLB statistics
- Batting average: .255
- Home runs: 40
- Runs batted in: 132

NPB statistics
- Batting average: .205
- Home runs: 3
- Runs batted in: 5
- Stats at Baseball Reference

Teams
- San Diego Padres (2015–2016, 2019); San Francisco Giants (2019–2021); Atlanta Braves (2022); Chunichi Dragons (2024)

Alexander Ross Dickerson (born May 26, 1990), nicknamed "Grandpa", is an American former professional baseball left fielder. He has previously played in Major League Baseball (MLB) for the San Diego Padres, San Francisco Giants, and Atlanta Braves, and in Nippon Professional Baseball (NPB) for the Chunichi Dragons.

In college at Indiana University he was a unanimous selection as the 2010 Big Ten Conference Baseball Player of the Year. Dickerson was drafted by the Pittsburgh Pirates in the third round of the 2011 Major League Baseball draft. He was the 2012 Florida State League Player of the Year, 2013 Eastern League Rookie of the Year, and 2015 Pacific Coast League Rookie of the Year. He made his MLB debut with the San Diego Padres in 2015. He underwent Tommy John surgery in 2018. Dickerson played for Team Israel in the 2023 World Baseball Classic.

== Amateur career ==
Dickerson attended Poway High School in Poway, California, and played on the baseball team as a first baseman and outfielder. He batted .354/.420/.686 as a junior, .455/.522/.851 as a senior, and was named All-San Diego Division I Player of the Year. At the age of fifteen Dickerson underwent back surgery, and first became known by the nickname Grandpa.

The Washington Nationals selected Dickerson in the 48th round of the 2008 Major League Baseball draft. He elected, however, to attend Indiana University, where he played outfield and designated hitter for the Indiana Hoosiers baseball team from 2009 to 2011. As a freshman, batting cleanup, Dickerson hit .370/.428/.618 with 14 home runs. He was named the Big Ten Conference's Freshman of the Year and received Freshman All-American honors.

Dickerson had a breakout season as a sophomore, slugging .805 (8th in the nation) and winning the Big Ten Triple Crown by leading the Big Ten in batting average (.419), home runs (24; second in the nation), and runs batted in (75). He was named the Big Ten Conference Baseball Player of the Year, and earned first-team All-American honors. In his junior season he batted .367/.440/.540.

In 2009 and 2010, he played collegiate summer baseball with the Wareham Gatemen of the Cape Cod Baseball League.

== Professional career ==
=== Pittsburgh Pirates ===
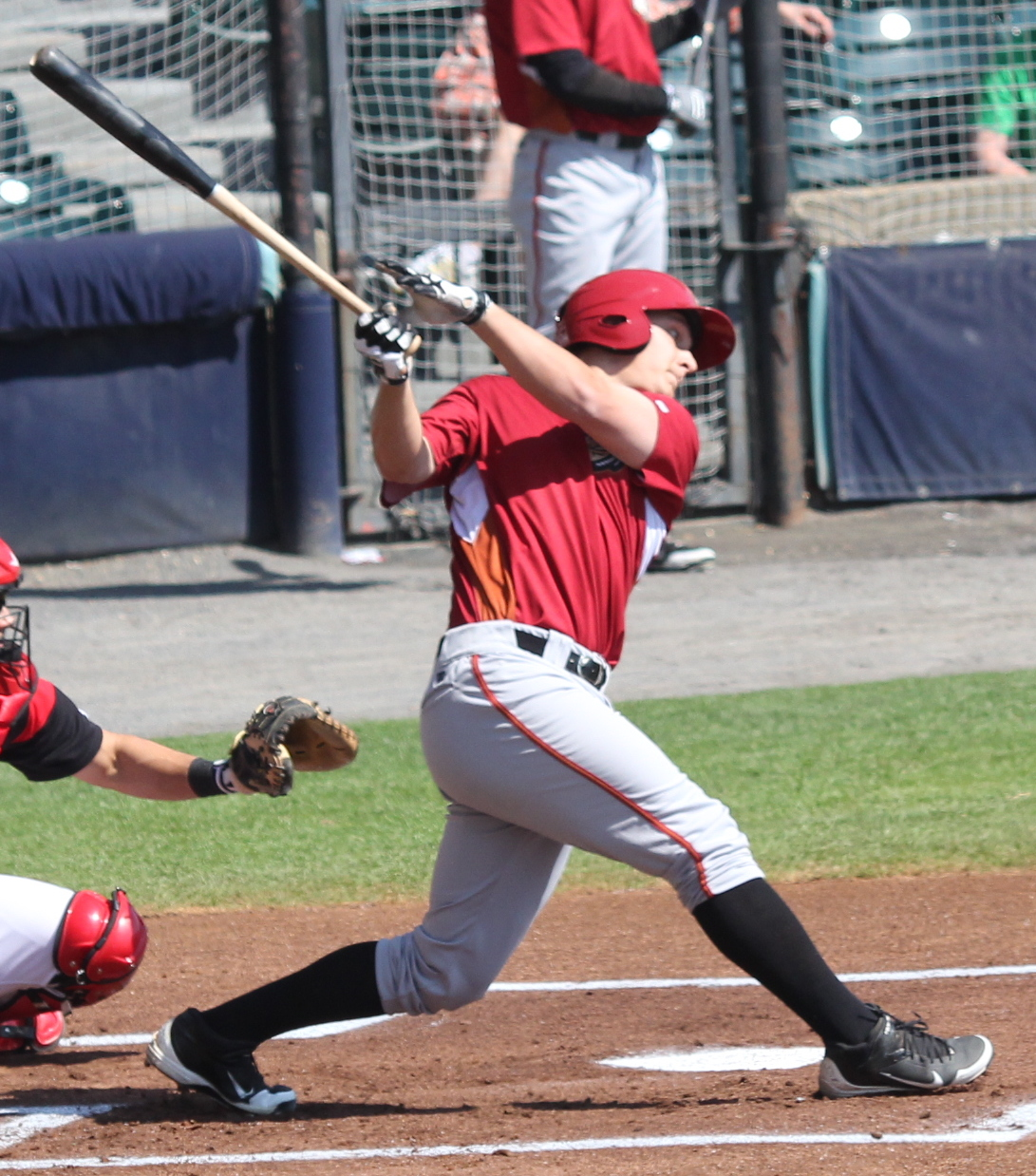
Dickerson with the Altoona Curve in 2013

The Pittsburgh Pirates selected Dickerson in the third round of the 2011 Major League Baseball draft. After signing for a signing bonus of $380,700, Dickerson spent most of the rest of the 2011 season with the State College Spikes, batting .313/.393/.493 with an .886 OPS (9th in the New York-Pennsylvania League) in 150 at bats; his 16 doubles were second among all short-season batters. Dickerson spent the 2012 season with the Bradenton Marauders, where he batted .295/.353/.451 with 31 doubles (4th in the league), 13 home runs (7th), and 90 RBIs (2nd) in 488 at bats and was named the Florida State League Player of the Year, a post-season All Star, and an MiLB organization All Star.

Prior to the 2013 season, Dickerson was named the 7th-best first base prospect in baseball by MLB.com. He spent 2013 with the Double-A Altoona Curve, where he moved from first base to the outfield. He batted .288/.337/.494 with 36 doubles (2nd in the league), 17 home runs, and 68 RBIs in 451 at bats and was named the Eastern League Rookie of the Year, a post-season All Star, and an MiLB organization All Star.

=== San Diego Padres ===
On November 25, 2013, the Pirates traded Dickerson to the San Diego Padres for Jaff Decker and Miles Mikolas. Dickerson sprained his left ankle in 2014 spring training with the Padres when he stepped on a sprinkler head, and an MRI later found a bone cyst in his left heel which required surgery and a bone graft. The surgery delayed his start to the 2014 season, but he finished with 34 games with the Double-A San Antonio Missions, batting .321/.367/.496 in 137 at bats. On November 20, 2014, the Padres added Dickerson to their 40-man roster to protect him from the Rule 5 draft.

Dickerson spent most of 2015 with the Triple-A El Paso Chihuahuas, hitting .307 (10th in the league)/.374/.503 with 82 runs (3rd), 36 doubles (6th), 9 triples (2nd), 12 home runs, and 71 RBIs in 459 at bats over 125 games, including 88 starts in left field. His performance earned him the Pacific Coast League Rookie of the Year Award, and he was named a post-season All Star and an MiLB organization All Star.

On August 6, 2015, Dickerson made his Major League debut with the San Diego Padres with a pinch-hitting appearance in the 8th inning. He was called up to replace Will Venable, who went on paternity leave. The next day, Dickerson collected his first Major League hit with a pinch single in extra innings. Dickerson returned to the Padres when rosters expanded in September. A tweaked hip flexor limited his playing opportunities, but Dickerson appeared in eight more games as a pinch hitter, and once as a defensive substitute in left field.

Dickerson started the 2016 season in Triple-A El Paso. On May 2, the Padres recalled Dickerson from Triple-A. On May 10 against the Chicago Cubs at Wrigley Field, Dickerson hit a pinch-hit grand slam off of Adam Warren for his first career home run and his first four career RBIs. He made his first Major League start in left field the following day, but was returned to El Paso on May 14. With the Chihuahuas, he continued a 28-game minor league hitting streak through the end of May. On June 28, Dickerson was recalled from El Paso when Jon Jay broke his forearm. Dickerson remained as the regular left fielder for the Padres for the remainder of the season. For the season, with El Paso he batted .382/.425/.622 with 10 home runs and 51 RBIs in 217 at bats. He finished the season with the Padres with a .257/.333/.455 batting line and 39 runs, 10 home runs, and 37 RBIs in 285 plate appearances. He made 65 starts in left field.

In spring training of 2017, Dickerson suffered a bulging disk. After initially trying to rehab the injury, Dickerson underwent back surgery by microdiscectomy to remove bulging disc material in his lower back which ended his season.

In spring training of 2018, while trying to come back from his back surgery, Dickerson tore his UCL in his elbow and underwent Tommy John surgery, costing him another full season. He was outrighted off the roster after the season. He elected free agency on November 3, 2018, and later re-signed to a minor league deal on December 11.

Playing for Triple–A El Paso in 2019, he hit .372/.469/.606 with 5 home runs and 20 RBI in 94 at–bats. Dickerson had his contract selected to the major leagues on May 3, 2019, but after 19 at–bats with the Padres was designated for assignment on June 5.

=== San Francisco Giants ===
On June 10, 2019, Dickerson was traded to the San Francisco Giants in exchange for Franklin van Gurp, one of the first trades with new Giants general manager Farhan Zaidi. He played seven games for the Triple-A Sacramento River Cats. On June 21, in his first game with the Giants, he hit a grand slam and had a career-high 6 runs batted in. With the Giants in 2019, he batted .290/.351/.529 with 28 runs, 6 home runs, and 26 RBIs in 155 at bats.

On September 1, 2020, Dickerson had a historic game which came as part of a 23–5 victory against the Rockies at Coors Field. He went 5–6 with 3 home runs and 2 doubles and tied the franchise records for runs scored (5) and total bases (16) in a game. His double in his last at bat traveled 414 feet and would have been a home run in any other MLB ballpark; thus he fell just short of tying Willie Mays' 4 home runs in a single game. In 2020 he batted .298/.371/.576 with 28 runs, 10 home runs, and 27 RBIs in 151 at bats. He played 41 games in left field, and 5 games in right field.

Avoiding arbitration, Dickerson and the Giants agreed on a $2.1 million salary for the 2021 season. During the season, he was on the injured list three times, with right shoulder, upper back, and right hamstring issues. In the 2021 regular season, he batted .233/.304/.420 with a career-high 13 home runs and 38 RBIs in 283 at bats. He played 82 games in left field, and his range factor per 9 innings of 1.78 was the fifth-best in the National League.

On November 22, 2021, Dickerson was designated for assignment by the Giants to make room for pitcher Anthony DeSclafani. On November 26, 2021, he was placed on unconditional release waivers.

=== Atlanta Braves ===
On March 16, 2022, Dickerson signed a non-guaranteed, major-league contract worth $1 million with the Atlanta Braves. The Braves designated Dickerson for assignment on April 28. Two days later, Dickerson was outrighted to the Gwinnett Stripers, for whom he batted .239/.305/.426 with 12 home runs and 43 RBIs in 322 at bats, playing 40 games in right field and 20 games in left field. He had four hits in 43 at bats for the Braves. On October 17, Dickerson elected free agency.

=== Acereros de Monclova ===
On April 8, 2023, Dickerson signed with the Acereros de Monclova of the Mexican League. In 12 games, he batted .261/.333/.370 with 12 hits and five RBI. Dickerson was released by Monclova on May 5.

=== Long Island Ducks ===
On May 12, 2023, Dickerson signed with the Long Island Ducks of the Atlantic League of Professional Baseball. In 115 games for the Ducks, Dickerson hit .314/.389/.576 with career–highs in home runs (26) and RBI (91).

=== Chunichi Dragons ===
On December 22, 2023, Dickerson signed with the Chunichi Dragons of Nippon Professional Baseball. In 32 games for Chunichi in 2024, slashing .205/.314/.352 with three home runs and five RBI. On October 26, 2024, the Dragons announced they would not bring Dickerson back for the 2025 season, making him a free agent.

=== High Point Rockers ===
On June 18, 2025, Dickerson signed with the High Point Rockers of the Atlantic League of Professional Baseball. In 78 appearances for High Point, he batted .265/.367/.514 with 19 home runs, 68 RBI, and two stolen bases.

On May 5, 2026, Dickerson re-signed with the Rockers. He retired from professional baseball on August 4. In 41 games he batted .278/.400/.503 with 8 home runs and 34 RBIs.

== Team Israel; World Baseball Classic ==
Dickerson played for Team Israel in the 2023 World Baseball Classic in Miami, in March 2023. He is eligible through his Jewish wife. He played for Team Israel manager and former All-Star Ian Kinsler, and alongside All-Star outfielder Joc Pederson and pitcher Dean Kremer, among others. He played right field and batted .250.

== Personal life ==
Dickerson and his wife Jennifer had a son in September 2020. They reside in San Diego.

== See also ==
- List of baseball players who underwent Tommy John surgery
