= Vasili Spanos =

American baseball player

- Third baseman
- Born: February 25, 1981 (age 44); Melrose Park, Illinois
- Bats: Right Throws: Right
- Stats at Baseball Reference

Vasili George Spanos (born February 25, 1981) is an American former professional baseball third baseman who played internationally for the Greece national baseball team at the 2004 Olympics, and professionally in the Oakland Athletics and Florida Marlins minor league systems from 2003 to 2008.

== Biography ==
A native of Melrose Park, Illinois, Spanos attended Indiana University Bloomington. In 2002, he played collegiate summer baseball for the Falmouth Commodores of the Cape Cod Baseball League, and was named a league all-star. Spanos was selected by Oakland in the 11th round of the 2003 MLB draft.
