= Joey DeNato =

American baseball player

Free agent
- Pitcher
- Born: March 17, 1992 (age 33); San Diego, California, U.S.
- Bats: Left Throws: Left
Medals
Men's baseball
Representing United States
WBSC Premier12
Silver medal – second place	2015 Tokyo	Team

Joey DeNato (born March 17, 1992) is an American former professional baseball pitcher who played internationally for the United States national baseball team.

== Career ==
=== Amateur career ===
DeNato attended Torrey Pines High School in the North County section of San Diego County, California. He attended Indiana University and played college baseball for the Indiana Hoosiers. In 2011 and 2012, he played collegiate summer baseball with the Yarmouth–Dennis Red Sox of the Cape Cod Baseball League. In 2014, he was named the Big Ten Conference's Pitcher of the Year.

=== Professional career ===
The Philadelphia Phillies selected DeNato in the 19th round of the 2014 Major League Baseball (MLB) draft.

DeNato signed with Philadelphia and spent 2014 with the Williamsport Crosscutters and Lakewood BlueClaws, posting a combined 4–1 record with a 1.93 ERA in 23 games.

In 2015, he pitched for both Lakewood and the Lehigh Valley IronPigs and compiled a 2–3 record, 1.67 ERA and 0.97 WHIP in 46 total relief appearances between the two clubs. After the season, he played for the United States national baseball team in the 2015 WBSC Premier12.

DeNato spent 2016 with the Clearwater Threshers and the Reading Fighting Phils, pitching to a 4.76 ERA in 56.2 relief innings.

In 2017, he played with Reading and Lehigh Valley, compiling a 6–2 record and 2.65 ERA in 33 total games between both teams.

In 2018, DeNato made four scoreless appearances for Reading before he was released from the organization on May 29, 2018.
