= Josh Phegley =

American baseball player (born 1988)

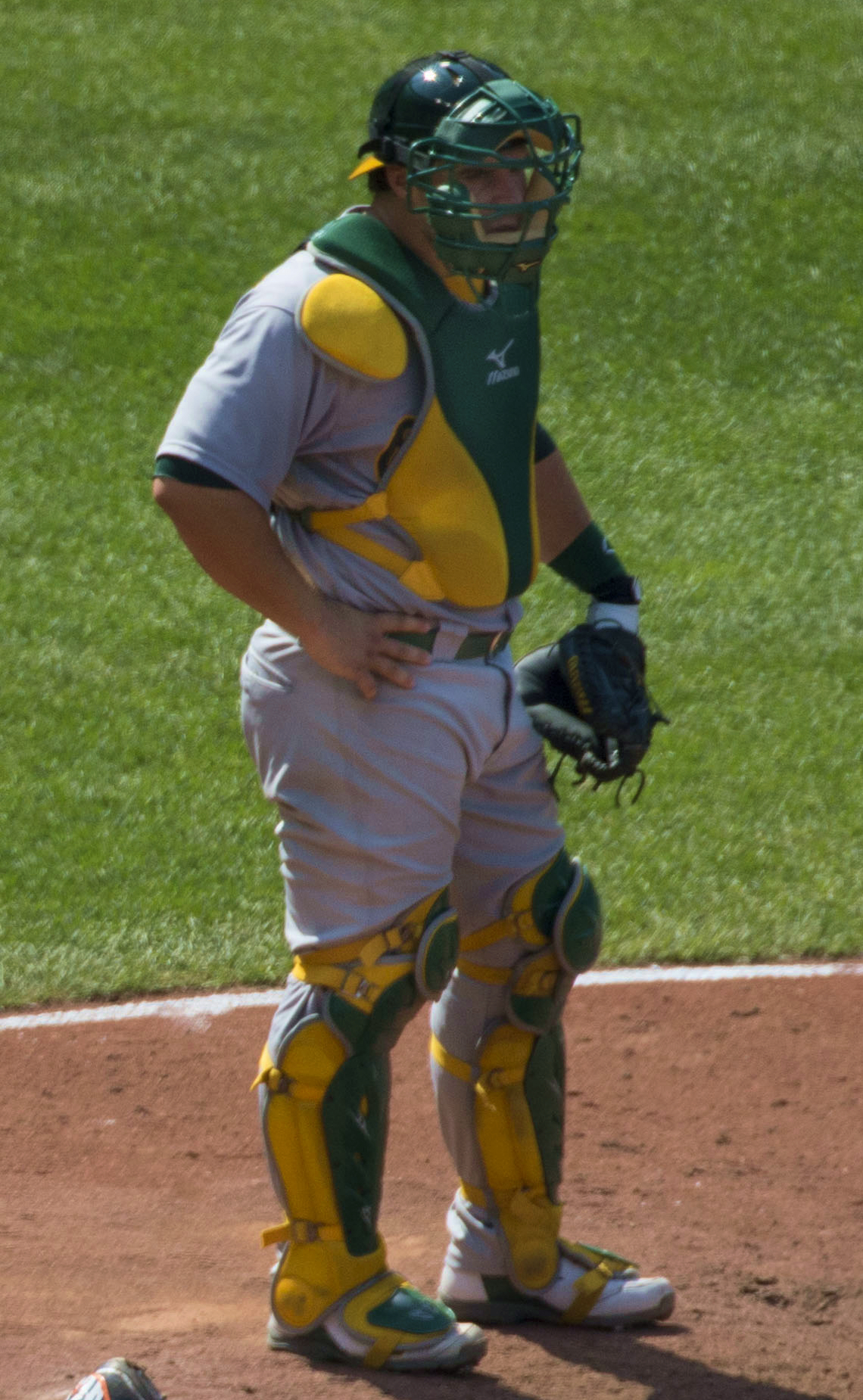
- Phegley with the Oakland Athletics
- Catcher
- Born: February 12, 1988 (age 38); Terre Haute, Indiana, U.S.
- Batted: Right Threw: Right

MLB debut
- July 5, 2013, for the Chicago White Sox

Last MLB appearance
- August 25, 2020, for the Chicago Cubs

MLB statistics
- Batting average: .225
- Home runs: 35
- Runs batted in: 162
- Stats at Baseball Reference

Teams
- Chicago White Sox (2013–2014); Oakland Athletics (2015–2019); Chicago Cubs (2020)

Joshua Aaron Phegley (born February 12, 1988) is an American former professional baseball catcher. He played in Major League Baseball (MLB) for the Chicago White Sox, Oakland Athletics, and Chicago Cubs.

== Amateur career ==
Phegley attended Terre Haute North Vigo High School in Terre Haute, Indiana. He was named Indiana's Mr. Baseball in 2006 after hitting .592 with 13 home runs and 50 RBIs. After high school, he attended Indiana University where he played college baseball for the Indiana Hoosiers baseball team. In 2007, he played collegiate summer baseball with the Wareham Gatemen of the Cape Cod Baseball League and was named a league all-star. In 2009, his junior year at Indiana, he slashed .344/.467/.633 with 17 home runs and 66 RBIs in 59 games.

== Professional career ==
=== Chicago White Sox ===
Phegley was drafted by the Chicago White Sox in the first round (38th overall) of the 2009 MLB draft. Phegley started his professional career in 2009 at Single–A with the Kannapolis hitting .224 with 9 home runs and 33 RBI in 52 games.

Then during an injury-plagued 2010 season, Phegley spent time at three different levels in the White Sox system, rookie league Bristol, High–A Winston-Salem and Double–A Birmingham. His totals for the 2010 season were a .284 batting average, five home runs and 26 RBI in 48 games. He did not play the full season because he was put on the disabled list more than once as he suffered from Idiopathic Thrombocytopenic Purpura (ITP), an uncommon blood autoimmune disorder that lowers platelet count and prevents blood from clotting. In November 2010 surgery he had his spleen removed, because doctors were of the view that the non-vital organ which is mainly a blood filter was where his platelets were being destroyed.

Phegley then began the 2011 season at Double-A Birmingham but was promoted to Triple–A Charlotte for the last month of the season. He hit a combined .242, with nine home runs and 56 RBI across 116 games. Phegley spent the entire 2012 season at Triple–A Charlotte where he hit .266 with six home runs and 48 RBI over 102 games. On November 19, 2012, the White Sox added Phegley to their 40-man roster to protect him from the Rule 5 draft.

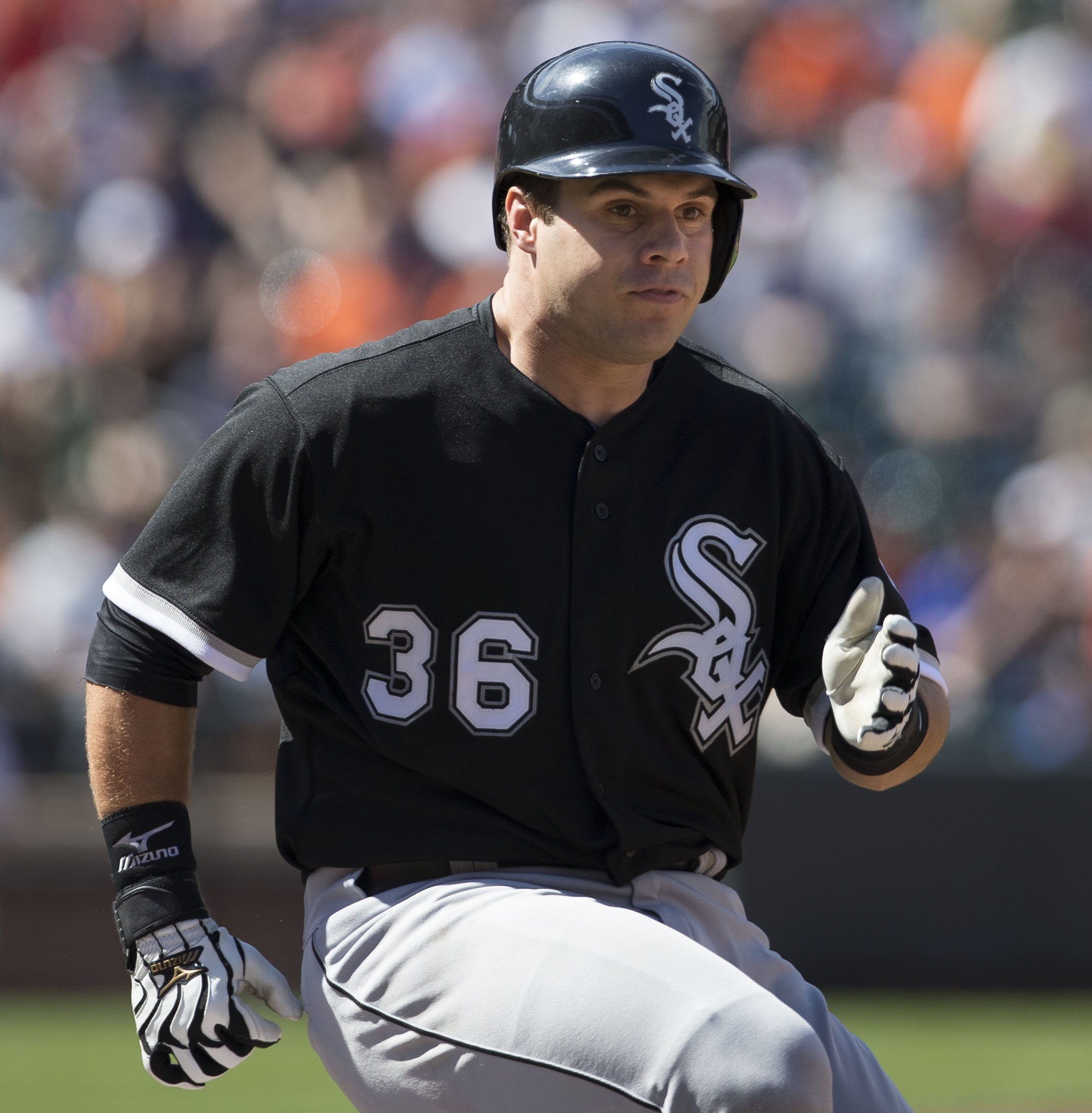
Phegley during his tenure with the Chicago White Sox in 2013

On July 5, 2013, Phegley was promoted to the major leagues for the first time after hitting .316 with 15 home runs, 18 doubles and 41 RBI with Charlotte. He collected his first major league hit and RBI on a single off of Tampa Bay Rays pitcher Jeremy Hellickson that same day. On July 7, Phegley recorded his first major league home run off of David Price. Phegley's first grand slam came four days later against Detroit's Aníbal Sánchez. In 65 games during his rookie campaign, Phegley batted .206/.223/.299 with four home runs and 22 RBI.

In 2014, Phegley played in 11 games for the White Sox and batted .216/.211/.514 with three home runs and seven RBI.

=== Oakland Athletics ===
On December 9, 2014, the White Sox traded Phegley, Marcus Semien, Chris Bassitt, and Rangel Ravelo to the Oakland Athletics in exchange for Jeff Samardzija and Michael Ynoa.

In 2015, he batted .249 with nine home runs and 34 RBIs in 73 games. His season concluded in mid-September because he suffered a concussion when Billy Butler inadvertently hit him in the back of his head with a bat during batting practice as Phegley was standing around the batting cage area.

In 2016, he batted .256/.314/.372 with a home run and 10 RBIs in 26 games, as his season was shortened by 97 games because he was twice on the disabled list with a strained and inflamed right knee suffering from synovitis (an inflammatory disease inside the membrane that lines the knee joint) for which he had surgery. He threw out 11% (1 of 9) of runners attempting to steal.

On May 7, 2019, he caught Mike Fiers' second career No-hitter. It was the first No-Hitter of the 2019 MLB season and the 300th No-Hitter in MLB history.99 Phegley was non-tendered by Oakland on December 2, 2019, and became a free agent.

=== Chicago Cubs ===
On January 17, 2020, Phegley signed a minor league contract with the Chicago Cubs. Phegley made the team out of Spring Training and was selected to the roster on July 23. On August 30, 2020, Phegley was designated for assignment. On September 30, 2020, the Cubs selected Phegley's contract. He became a free agent after the season.

On February 3, 2021, Phegley announced his retirement from professional baseball.

== Post-playing career ==
On August 18, 2022, Phegley was named the director of player development for Michigan.
