= Mickey Morandini =

American baseball player (born 1966)

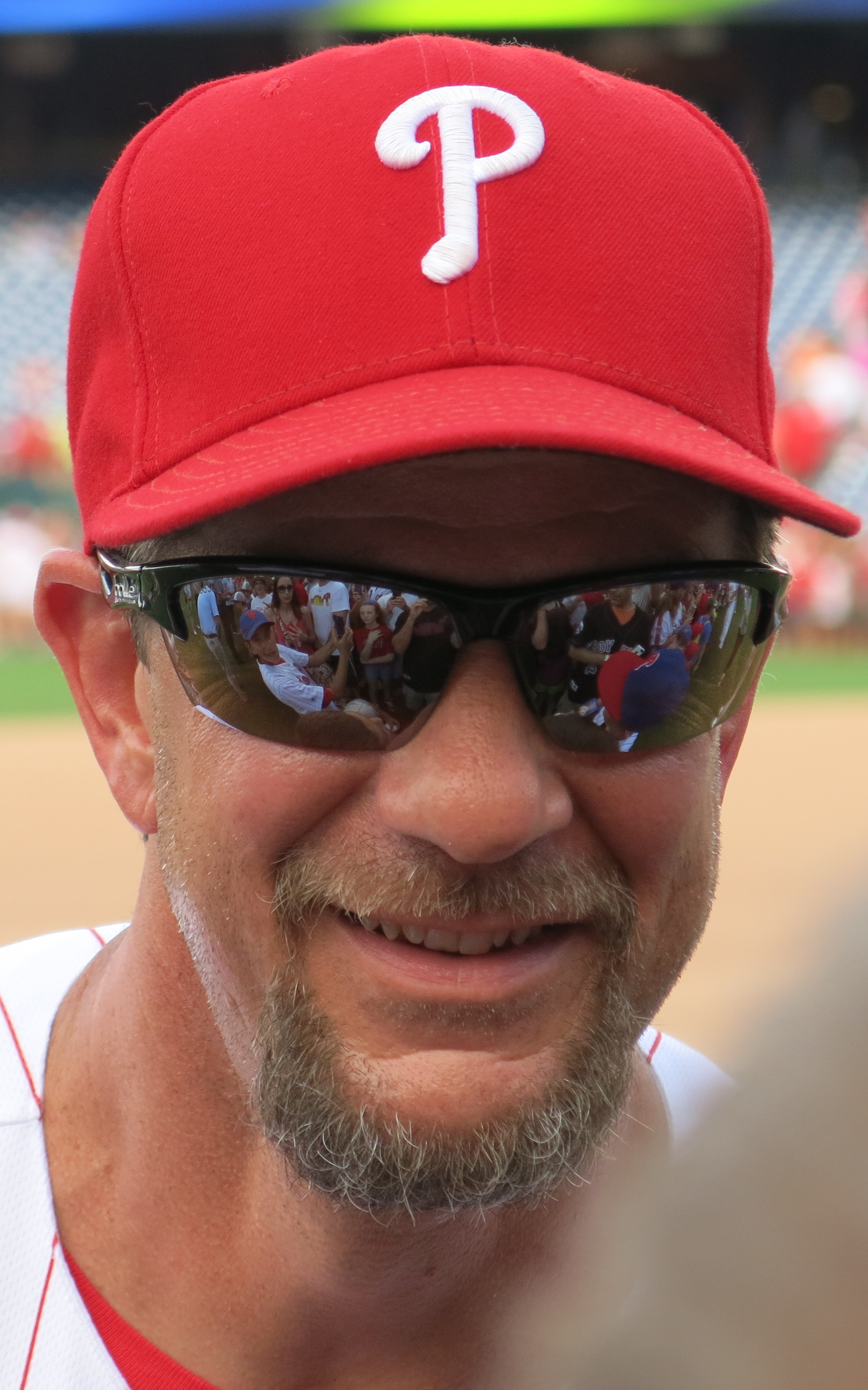
- Morandini with the Phillies in 2016
- Second baseman
- Born: April 22, 1966 (age 60); Kittanning, Pennsylvania, U.S.
- Batted: Left Threw: Right

MLB debut
- September 1, 1990, for the Philadelphia Phillies

Last MLB appearance
- October 1, 2000, for the Toronto Blue Jays

MLB statistics
- Batting average: .268
- Home runs: 32
- Runs batted in: 351
- Stats at Baseball Reference

Teams
- As player: Philadelphia Phillies (1990–1997); Chicago Cubs (1998–1999); Philadelphia Phillies (2000); Toronto Blue Jays (2000); As coach: Philadelphia Phillies (2016–2017)

Career highlights and awards
- All-Star (1995)
Medals
Men's baseball
Representing United States
Olympic Games
Gold medal – first place	1988 Seoul	Team
Baseball World Cup
Silver medal – second place	1988 Rome	Team
Intercontinental Cup
Silver medal – second place	1987 Havana	Team

Michael Robert "Mickey" Morandini (born April 22, 1966), is an American former professional baseball second baseman and coach, who played in Major League Baseball (MLB) for the Philadelphia Phillies, Chicago Cubs, and Toronto Blue Jays. His career highlights include selection as a 1995 National League (NL) All-Star, playing for the Phillies in the 1993 NL Championship Series and World Series, and appearing for the Cubs in the 1998 NL Division Series.

== Early life and career ==
Morandini grew up in the Pittsburgh suburb of Leechburg, Pennsylvania, where he attended Leechburg Area High School. After graduation, Morandini attended Indiana University, where he started his college career as a center fielder, moving to the infield as a third baseman and shortstop after his freshman year.

In 1987, he played collegiate summer baseball in the Cape Cod Baseball League (CCBL) for the Yarmouth-Dennis Red Sox, winning the league batting title, and being named league MVP. In 2005, he was inducted into the CCBL Hall of Fame.

Morandini declined the option to enter the Major League Baseball draft in 1987, citing his desire to play for the United States national team in the 1988 Summer Olympics in Seoul, South Korea. After appearing in one game during the Olympics, he returned to Indiana for his senior season; he was named a second-team All-American for the 1988 season.

Morandini graduated as the Indiana University record-holder in several statistical categories, including runs scored (277), doubles (61), triples (29), and stolen bases (127). The Philadelphia Phillies selected Morandini in the fifth round of the 1988 Major League Baseball draft.

=== Minor leagues ===
After drafting Morandini, the Phillies assigned him to the Spartanburg Phillies, one of their A-level affiliates in Spartanburg, South Carolina. He played in 63 games for Spartanburg in 1989, batting .338 with 19 doubles, earning him a promotion to the high-A Clearwater Phillies. In Florida, he notched 19 hits and 14 runs scored in 63 at-bats; he also batted in four runs. Finishing the season with the AA-level Reading Phillies, Morandini hit 5 home runs in 188 at-bats, posting a .351 average. Morandini won the 1989 Paul Owens Award as the top minor league position player in the Phillies organization. Morandini committed 22 errors in his first professional season as a shortstop and with Dickie Thon playing shortstop at the major league level, the Phillies organization shifted him to his eventual major league position, second base during the 1989 Florida Instructional league season.

Morandini spent the majority of the 1990 season with the AAA Scranton/Wilkes-Barre Red Barons. While playing in 139 games, he stole 16 bases and batted in 31 runs in 503 at-bats. He also batted .260 and scored 76 runs. During this season, Morandini was named 41st out of the top 50 prospects in Major League Baseball by Baseball America. The move to second base improved his fielding percentage greatly; Morandini cut his errors in half in only one season, posting 11 with Scranton/Wilkes-Barre. He also earned a short promotion to the major league club; he played in 25 games, hitting 4 doubles and 1 home run in 87 plate appearances.

== Major league career ==
=== 1990–1997: Philadelphia Phillies ===
After a short stint in Scranton to start 1991, Morandini returned to the major leagues for the remainder of his career. He amassed four triples and thirteen stolen bases in his first full season, highlighting his speed. The following season produced one of the most memorable moments of Morandini's career. In a game against the Pittsburgh Pirates on September 20, 1992, he turned an unassisted triple play. In the sixth inning, Morandini caught a line drive off of the bat of Jeff King, touched second base to put out Andy Van Slyke, and tagged out Barry Bonds coming from first base; the Pirates went on to win the game, 3–2, in extra innings. It was the first unassisted triple play since 1968, and the first in the National League since 1927. Morandini was also the first second baseman in National League history, and the first in the regular season, to turn an unassisted triple play; all previous occurrences were made by first basemen or shortstops. The only other second baseman to achieve the feat prior was Bill Wambsganss, who turned a triple play in the 1920 World Series.

The Phillies appeared in the World Series in 1993 with Morandini at the top of the lineup; he batted second in manager Jim Fregosi's batting order more often than any other position. During the season, he turned 48 double plays with infield partner Kevin Stocker. Morandini had a .247 batting average during the season, the lowest among the Phillies' starters; he was second on the team in stolen bases to Lenny Dykstra, and led the team in triples with nine. His triples total was also tied for third-best in the National League. In 1994, Morandini posted the highest on-base plus slugging percentage (OPS) of his career, with a .787 mark. He also walked 34 times in 316 plate appearances, but lost playing time to Mariano Duncan, who appeared at all four infield positions throughout the season. 1995 was arguably Morandini's finest season; he batted .283 with 6 home runs, 7 triples, and 49 RBI. He was also named to the 1995 All-Star team; he appeared in the game, going 0-for-1, and was one of five Phillies to be selected for the team.

Morandini racked up the highest stolen base total of his career in 1996, with 26, though it was a down year for him statistically. His batting average was .250, with 3 home runs, 6 triples, and 24 doubles. He struck out 87 times while walking 49, and amassed 135 hits in 606 plate appearances. The following year, his batting average was at its highest point during his career as a Phillie; Morandini hit .295 and slugged .380. He posted a fielding percentage of .990, making only 6 errors while recording 87 double plays; Morandini's defense throughout his career earned him the nickname "Dandy Little Glove Man". After the 1997 season, Morandini was traded to the Chicago Cubs for outfielder Doug Glanville.

=== 1998–1999: Chicago Cubs ===
In 1998, Morandini posted a .296 batting average, along with 172 hits, 8 home runs, and 53 RBI, all career highs. He and the Cubs also appeared in the 1998 National League Division Series, but lost to the Atlanta Braves. Morandini made his only appearance in the Most Valuable Player award balloting, tying with Javy López for 24th in the voting. Morandini's production declined in 1999, as he hit .241 and scored 60 runs, and he chose free agency after the season, signing with the Montreal Expos in January 2000.

=== 2000: Last season and retirement ===
Two months after signing with Montreal, the Phillies purchased his rights from the Expos, and he returned to Philadelphia for the 2000 season. After batting .252 and hitting four triples for the Phillies, they traded him to the Toronto Blue Jays in August for Rob Ducey. Morandini played his final two months in the American League, batting at the bottom of the order for the Jays. He had 29 hits in 107 at-bats, good for a .271 average, and stole a base.

=== Career statistics ===
In 1,298 games over 11 seasons, Morandini posted a .268 batting average (1,222-for-4,558) with 597 runs, 209 doubles, 54 triples, 32 home runs, 351 RBI, 123 stolen bases, 437 bases on balls, .338 on-base percentage and .359 slugging percentage. He finished his career with a .989 fielding percentage as a second baseman. In 10 postseason games, he batted .233 (7-for-30) with 3 runs, 1 triple, 3 RBI and 3 walks.

== Post-player activities ==
Morandini and his wife, Peg have three sons and reside in Chesterton, Indiana, where the family opened a stationery business. He was the head baseball coach at Valparaiso High School until accepting the manager's position for the Williamsport Crosscutters, one of the Phillies' A-level affiliates, for the 2011 season. On November 21, 2011, he was named the 10th manager of the Philadelphia Phillies A-level Affiliate Lakewood BlueClaws. On November 2, 2015, Morandini was named first base coach of the Philadelphia Phillies. After two years as a coach, the team promoted Morandini to an off-field role as club ambassador.

== See also ==
- List of celebrities who own wineries and vineyards

Sporting positions
Preceded by Juan Samuel	Philadelphia Phillies first base coach 2016-2017	Succeeded by José David Flores
