= Doug DeVore =

American baseball player (born 1977)

- Outfielder
- Born: December 14, 1977 (age 48); Columbus, Ohio, U.S.
- Batted: Left Threw: Left

MLB debut
- May 6, 2004, for the Arizona Diamondbacks

Last MLB appearance
- October 3, 2004, for the Arizona Diamondbacks

MLB statistics
- Batting average: .224
- Home runs: 3
- Runs batted in: 13
- Stats at Baseball Reference

Teams
- Arizona Diamondbacks (2004)

Douglas Rinehart DeVore (born December 14, 1977) is an American former Major League Baseball outfielder who played in 50 games for the Arizona Diamondbacks in 2004.

== Early life and college career ==
DeVore was born on December 14, 1977, in Columbus, Ohio. He played high school baseball at Dublin High School in Dublin, Ohio as a left-handed pitcher. He was drafted by the Cincinnati Reds in the 35th round of the 1996 Major League Baseball draft, but did not sign. The Reds had intended to take DeVore after the 10th round, but his placement fell after he expressed disinterest in play professionally out of high school. Instead, went on to play baseball for Indiana University Bloomington as an outfielder. DeVore was named a first-team All Big Ten selection in his junior year, finishing the season with a .360 batting average, 19 home runs and 65 runs batted in. He batted .322 from 1997 to 1999. The Arizona Diamondbacks drafted DeVore in the 12th round of the 1999 Major League Baseball draft and he signed a professional contract with the club in early June.

== Professional career ==
He began his minor league career with the Missoula Osprey of the Pioneer League in 1999, hitting .235 in 32 games for Arizona's Rookie level affiliate. He was promoted to the Single A South Bend Silver Hawks in 2000, ending the season with a .292 average and 15 home runs.

DeVore spent the entire 2001 season with the Double-A El Paso Diablos, hitting .294 with 74 RBI. In November, he was added to the Diamondbacks' 40-man roster. DeVore played the entire 2002 and 2003 seasons with the Triple-A Tucson Sidewinders. After the 2003 season, he had ulnar collateral ligament surgery on his left elbow and was designated for assignment. He began the 2004 season in Tucson, hitting .305, before being promoted to the Diamondbacks in late April, despite not being on the club's 40-man roster, after Richie Sexson was placed on the disabled list.

== Major leagues ==
On May 6, 2004, DeVore made his major league debut against the Chicago Cubs, going hitless as a pinch hitter. He recorded two hits in his 14 at bats before being optioned back to Tucson after Sexson returned from injury on May 21. Sexson returned to the disabled list the next day and DeVore was recalled. After hitting .170 through his first 24 games, he was designated for assignment once again and returned to the Sidewinders. After Arizona traded Roberto Alomar to the Chicago White Sox, DeVore was recalled for a third time on August 5. He returned to Tucson on August 21 when Arizona selected Jerry Gil's contract. DeVore returned to the Diamondbacks as a September call-up. Remaining with the club through the end of the season, DeVore finished with a .224 average, three home runs and 13 RBI in 50 games.

== Later career ==
DeVore signed a minor league contract with Arizona in January 2005 and began this season with Triple-A Tucson. Through his first 44 games, Devore had a .289 batting average and 32 RBI.

On June 3, with the Sidewinders in Fresno, California for a series against the Fresno Grizzlies, he was traded to the San Francisco Giants for Matt Herges and assigned to Fresno. He hit .299 in 65 games for Fresno, but was not called up to the majors. In the offseason, DeVore played for Yaquis de Obregón of the Mexican Pacific League. He played for both the Guerreros de Oaxaca of the Mexican League and the Newark Bears of the Atlantic League of Professional Baseball in 2006, before he announced his retirement in June.

DeVore was named as the hitting coach for the High-A Florida Fire Frogs in the Atlanta Braves organization for the 2019 season, the final in club history.
