= Andrew Saalfrank =

American baseball player (born 1997)

Free agent
- Pitcher
- Born: August 18, 1997 (age 29); Fort Wayne, Indiana, U.S.
- Bats: Left Throws: Left

MLB debut
- September 5, 2023, for the Arizona Diamondbacks

MLB statistics (through 2025 season)
- Win–loss record: 2–1
- Earned run average: 1.79
- Strikeouts: 25
- Stats at Baseball Reference

Teams
- Arizona Diamondbacks (2023–2025)

Andrew Jacob Saalfrank (born August 18, 1997) is an American professional baseball pitcher who is a free agent. He has previously played in Major League Baseball (MLB) for the Arizona Diamondbacks. He made his MLB debut in 2023.

== Amateur career ==
A native of Fort Wayne, Indiana, Saalfrank graduated from Heritage Junior/Senior High School. He enrolled at Indiana University Bloomington, where he played college baseball for the Indiana Hoosiers. In 2018, he played collegiate summer baseball with the Bourne Braves of the Cape Cod Baseball League.

== Professional career ==
The Arizona Diamondbacks selected Saalfrank in the sixth round, with the 182nd overall selection, of the 2019 Major League Baseball draft. Saalfrank made his professional debut with the rookie–level Arizona League Diamondbacks and was promoted to the Low–A Hillsboro Hops following that appearance. In 7 games (5 starts) for Hillsboro, he recorded a 3.86 ERA with 21 strikeouts in 11 2/3 innings pitched.

Saalfrank underwent Tommy John surgery prior to the 2021 season and missed the entire year as a result. He returned to action in 2022, splitting the season between High–A Hillsboro and the Double–A Amarillo Sod Poodles. In 38 total relief appearances, he registered a 3.52 ERA with 70 strikeouts in 53 2/3 innings pitched.

In 2023, Saalfrank split time between Amarillo and the Triple–A Reno Aces. In 44 combined appearances, he logged an 8–2 record and 2.53 ERA with 93 strikeouts and 2 saves in 64.0 innings of work. On September 4, 2023, Saalfrank was selected to the 40-man roster and promoted to the major leagues for the first time. In 10 appearances during his rookie campaign, he did not cede an earned run, striking out six in 10 1/3 innings.

Saalfrank was optioned to Triple–A Reno to begin the 2024 season. He made only two appearances for Arizona, surrendering four runs on four hits with no strikeouts in one inning pitched. On June 4, 2024, MLB suspended Saalfrank for one year for violating the league's gambling policy.

On June 5, 2025, Saalfrank was activated from the restricted list and optioned to the rookie-level Arizona Complex League Diamondbacks. On August 20, Saalfrank recorded his first career win, tossing 2/3 scoreless innings against the Cleveland Guardians. He made 28 appearances for the Diamondbacks during the regular season, compiling a 2–1 record and 1.24 ERA with 19 strikeouts and three saves over 29 innings of work.

On February 9, 2026, it was announced that Saalfrank had undergone season-ending shoulder surgery. On November 20, 2026, he was non-tendered by the Diamondbacks and became a free agent.
