= Zach McClellan =

American baseball player (born 1978)

- Relief pitcher
- Born: November 25, 1978 (age 47); Toledo, Ohio, U.S.
- Batted: Right Threw: Right

MLB debut
- April 16, 2007, for the Colorado Rockies

Last MLB appearance
- May 13, 2007, for the Colorado Rockies

MLB statistics
- Win–loss record: 1-0
- Earned run average: 5.79
- Strikeouts: 13
- Stats at Baseball Reference

Teams
- Colorado Rockies (2007)

Zachary Daniel McClellan (born November 25, 1978) is a former professional baseball pitcher. He has played part of one season in Major League Baseball with the Colorado Rockies in 2007, and is retired from professional baseball.

An alumnus of Indiana University, McClellan made his Major League Baseball debut with the Colorado Rockies on April 16, 2007, against the San Francisco Giants at Coors Field. His lone MLB victory came in relief on May 7, 2007. He became a free agent at the end of the 2008 season. After not pitching professionally in 2009, he pitched in four games for the independent Gary SouthShore RailCats in 2010.
