= Kevin Orie =

American baseball player (born 1972)

- Third baseman
- Born: September 1, 1972 (age 52); West Chester, Pennsylvania, U.S.
- Batted: Right Threw: Right

MLB debut
- April 1, 1997, for the Chicago Cubs

Last MLB appearance
- September 26, 2002, for the Chicago Cubs

MLB statistics
- Batting average: .249
- Home runs: 22
- Runs batted in: 116
- Stats at Baseball Reference

Teams
- Chicago Cubs (1997–1998); Florida Marlins (1998–1999); Chicago Cubs (2002)

Kevin Leonard Orie (born September 1, 1972) is an American former professional baseball third baseman. He is an alumnus of Indiana University, where he was a standout for the Hoosiers baseball team.

== Career ==
=== Chicago Cubs ===
The Chicago Cubs selected Orie with the 29th pick in the first round of the 1993 Major League Baseball draft. Orie made his Major League Baseball debut on April 1, 1997, as a member of the Chicago Cubs. It was in his rookie year of 1997 that Orie put up his best career statistics. In 114 games played, Orie compiled a .275 batting average with 8 home runs and 44 RBI. Orie was a finalist in the 1997 MLB Rookie of the Year Award balloting, losing out to the eventual winner, Scott Rolen.

Orie had a role in Kerry Wood's near perfect game on May 6, 1998, where he threw a one-hit, no walk, 20-strikeout shutout against the Houston Astros, tying Roger Clemens' record for strikeouts in a nine-inning game and breaking Bill Gullickson's single-game rookie record of 18 strikeouts in 1980. Wood allowed only two baserunners: an infield single by Ricky Gutierrez, and he hit Craig Biggio. The single went off third baseman Orie's glove.

=== Florida Marlins ===
Through the first 64 games of the 1998 season, Orie got off to a dismal start, compiling only a .181 batting average in over 200 at-bats. Subsequently, on the last day before the July 31 trading deadline, the Cubs sent Orie and minor leaguer Todd Noel to the Florida Marlins for Félix Heredia and minor leaguer Steve Hoff.

After concluding the 1998 season with the Marlins, Orie remained with Florida for the entire 1999 season, tallying a .254 batting average with 6 home runs and 29 RBI while appearing in 77 games.

=== Free agency ===
After the 1999 season, the Marlins needed to make room for their future third baseman, Mike Lowell, making Orie expendable. On November 12, 1999, the Marlins sent Orie to the Los Angeles Dodgers as part of a conditional deal. Although Orie put together an impressive spring training with the Dodgers prior to the 2000 season, the club already had two established third basemen on their roster: Adrián Beltré & Dave Hansen. Thus, the Dodgers released Orie on March 29, 2000, days before the season would begin.

Two months later, on June 15, 2000, Orie signed a free agent contract with the Kansas City Royals, only to be released two months later. The next suitor for Orie turned out to be the New York Yankees, who signed Orie two days after his Royals release. He remained in the Yankees minor league system the entire 2000 season, without making a single appearance at the major league level.

After the 2000 season, Orie was released. He signed another free agent contract prior to the 2001 season with the Philadelphia Phillies, and spent the length of the season in the minor leagues before being released.

On November 19, 2001, Orie was signed by one of his old teams, the Chicago Cubs. He appeared in 13 games with the Cubs in 2002, serving as a backup to starting third baseman Bill Mueller. On March 12, 2003, Orie's second stint with the Cubs ended.

Over the next three years, Orie was signed by three more teams: the Cleveland Indians, Houston Astros, and Milwaukee Brewers. He did not appear in the majors with any of the teams.

=== 2006 ===
Orie went to camp with the Houston Astros. Although Orie had played in only 13 major league games since the 1999 season concluded, he compiled impressive numbers every year in the minor leagues. Many thought that Orie still had the potential to stick in the major leagues and serve as a valuable backup third baseman for a number of teams. Orie didn't make the Astros and was assigned to the Triple-A Round Rock Express. Orie retired after the first game of the season.

=== Post-retirement ===
Orie is an associate specializing in retail with real estate management firm Grubb Ellis in Pittsburgh and later served as the pregame and postgame announcer for 93.7 The Fan in Pittsburgh.

== Personal life ==
Orie was married to Melissa Kratsa Orie, whom he had three daughters with. Melissa died on February 24, 2013.
