= Mike Smith (infielder) =

American baseball player

Michael Alexander Smith (born December 1, 1969, in Piqua, Ohio) is a former professional baseball infielder.

Smith attended Indiana University. While playing at Indiana from 1989 to 1992, Smith had one of the most explosive careers in NCAA baseball history. In 1992, he became the only Division I player ever to win the Triple Crown. He batted .490 with 27 home runs and 95 RBI during his senior campaign to lead the nation in all three categories. Those numbers earned him first-team All-America honors, a first team All-Big Ten selection for the second season in a row (1991–92), and Big Ten Player of the Year honors. He was also named the Sporting News National Player of the Year and was a recipient of the R.E. "Bob" Smith Award, which is awarded by the National College Baseball Writers Association (NCBWA) to its College Baseball Player of the Year.

Smith was drafted by the Texas Rangers in the 5th round (146th overall) of the 1992 Major League Baseball draft. He played five seasons in the minor leagues, all in the Rangers' farm system. His final professional season was 1996, which he spent with the Oklahoma City 89ers.
