= List of Nebraska Cornhuskers baseball seasons =

Season-by-season records of the Nebraska Cornhuskers baseball team

This is a list of Nebraska Cornhuskers baseball seasons. Nebraska competes as part of NCAA Division I, representing the University of Nebraska–Lincoln in the Big Ten.

Nebraska has been to the NCAA Division I tournament twenty times and advanced to three College World Series. The Cornhuskers have won eight regular season conference championships and six conference tournament championships across the Big Eight, Big 12, and Big Ten. The team has completed 121 seasons.

== Seasons ==
Regular season champion	Tournament champion	Regular season and tournament champion

Season	Coach (Note: Coaching history unavailable for 1899, 1900, 1905, 1910, and 1912.)	Overall	Conference	Standing	Postseason (Note: The NCAA began holding district playoffs in 1947, but considers these unofficial. The inaugural NCAA Division I baseball tournament was held in 1954.)	Final rank (Note: Baseball America began publishing a weekly college baseball poll in 1980.)
Independent (1889–1925)
1889	C. D. Chandler	1–2				
1890	C. D. Chandler	2–3				
1891	C. D. Chandler	1–0				
1892	Charles Stroman	0–2–1				
1893	Charles Stroman	3–0				
1894	Did not compete					
1895	Did not compete					
1896	Did not compete					
1897	Edward N. Robinson	8–5–1				
1898	F. B. Ryons	6–4				
1899	Unknown	8–4				
1900	Unknown	8–12				
1901	Mike Henderson	9–11				
1902	Geo P. Shidler	17–8				
1903	Did not compete					
1904	J. H. Bell	10–3				
1905	Unknown	5–16–1				
1906	S. S. Eager	5–12–1				
1907	Ducky Holmes	5–11–1				
1908	Billy Fox	4–12–2				
1909	Billy Fox	12–14				
1910	Unknown	7–7–1				
1911	Did not compete					
1912	Unknown	3–0				
1913	Did not compete (World War I)					
1914	Did not compete (World War I)					
1915	Did not compete (World War I)					
1916	Did not compete (World War I)					
1917	Did not compete (World War I)					
1918	Did not compete (World War I)					
1919	Paul J. Schissler	5–3				
1920	Paul J. Schissler	7–6				
1921	Paul J. Schissler	8–5				
1922	Owen Frank	12–4				
1923	Scotty Dye; Earl Carr (Note: Nebraska went 4–4 under Scotty Dye and 2–8 under Earl Carr in 1923.)	6–12				
1924	William G. Kline	10–8				
1925	William G. Kline	8–7				
1926	Did not compete					
1927	Did not compete					
1928	Did not compete					
MVIAA / Big Eight Conference (Note: In 1928, the ten member schools of the Missouri Valley Intercollegiate Athletic Association agreed to a splintering of the conference – Iowa State, Kansas, Kansas State, Missouri, Nebraska, and Oklahoma retained the MVIAA name and Drake, Grinnell, Oklahoma A&M (now Oklahoma State), and Washington University formed the Missouri Valley Conference. The MVIAA became commonly known as the Big Six, and later the Big Seven and Big Eight. Its name was officially changed to the Big Eight in 1964.) (1929–1996)
1929	John Rhodes	12–5–1	10–5	1st		
1930	John Rhodes	9–7	7–5	3rd		
1931	W. H. Browne	2–10	2–8	6th		
1932	Did not compete					
1933	W. W. Knight	3–1	–	–		
1934	W. W. Knight	5–9	2–8	–		
1935	W. W. Knight	4–12	2–7	5th		
1936	W. W. Knight	3–11	2–9	5th		
1937	W. W. Knight	5–12	4–9	4th		
1938	W. W. Knight	7–8	5–5	4th		
1939	W. W. Knight	5–13	4–6	3rd		
1940	W. W. Knight	4–12	3–9	5th		
1941	W. W. Knight	2–14	2–8	6th		
1942	Adolph J. Lewandowski	3–11	3–6	5th		
1943	Did not compete (World War II)					
1944	Did not compete (World War II)					
1945	Did not compete (World War II)					
1946	Frank Smagacz	9–7	9–5	2nd		
1947	Tony Sharpe	6–9–1	6–7	4th		
1948	Tony Sharpe	17–6	14–3	1st	NCAA District playoffs	
1949	Tony Sharpe	9–13	7–10	7th		
1950	Tony Sharpe	16–8	11–3	1st	NCAA District playoffs	
1951	Tony Sharpe	10–5	5–4	3rd		
1952	Tony Sharpe	13–7	8–5	7th		
1953	Tony Sharpe	12–5–2	10–3	2nd		
1954	Tony Sharpe	10–10	4–8	6th		
1955	Tony Sharpe	15–5	10–4	3rd		
1956	Tony Sharpe	12–8	8–4	2nd		
1957	Tony Sharpe	12–10	8–9	5th		
1958	Tony Sharpe	17–10	12–9	5th		
1959	Tony Sharpe	11–11	11–4	2nd		
1960	Tony Sharpe	9–12	6–11	7th		
1961	Tony Sharpe	9–14	7–11	6th		
1962	Tony Sharpe	15–11	10–10	5th		
1963	Tony Sharpe	10–16	5–15	6th		
1964	Tony Sharpe	9–18	7–14	6th		
1965	Tony Sharpe	12–8	12–6	2nd		
1966	Tony Sharpe	16–9	12–8	3rd		
1967	Tony Sharpe	8–16	7–11	6th		
1968	Tony Sharpe	10–15–1	7–13	7th		
1969	Tony Sharpe	9–15	4–12	8th		
1970	Tony Sharpe	14–12	11–8	3rd		
1971	Tony Sharpe	10–20	7–13	7th		
1972	Tony Sharpe	12–17	8–11	7th		
1973	Tony Sharpe	15–14–1	7–11	6th		
1974	Tony Sharpe	13–27	4–16	8th		
1975	Tony Sharpe	13–20	7–8	5th		
1976	Tony Sharpe	21–24–1	0–2	7th		
1977	Tony Sharpe	29–13	5–7	3rd (East)		
1978	John Sanders	36–20	7–7	3rd (East)		
1979	John Sanders	49–15	14–6	2nd (East)	NCAA Division I Regional	
1980	John Sanders	49–15	16–4	1st (East)	NCAA Division I Regional	14
1981	John Sanders	42–22	11–11	4th		
1982	John Sanders	44–13	15–5	2nd		10
1983	John Sanders	44–15	8–10	5th		
1984	John Sanders	46–20	15–6	3rd		29
1985	John Sanders	45–24	16–6	3rd	NCAA Division I Regional	16
1986	John Sanders	35–25	14–9	3rd		
1987	John Sanders	36–21	12–8	3rd		
1988	John Sanders	48–23	12–12	4th		
1989	John Sanders	27–31	8–16	7th		
1990	John Sanders	42–26	12–12	3rd		
1991	John Sanders	37–22	10–14	6th		
1992	John Sanders	31–25	11–13	5th		
1993	John Sanders	35–23	16–12	4th		
1994	John Sanders	32–28	14–16	5th		
1995	John Sanders	35–23	13–14	4th		
1996	John Sanders	27–27–1	8–17	7th		
Big 12 Conference (1997–2011)
1997	John Sanders	27–35	7–23	10th		
1998	Dave Van Horn	24–20	10–13	7th		
1999	Dave Van Horn	42–18	16–9	5th	NCAA Division I Regional	25
2000	Dave Van Horn	51–17	21–9	2nd	NCAA Division I Super Regional	11
2001	Dave Van Horn	50–16	20–8	1st	NCAA Division I College World Series	6
2002	Dave Van Horn	47–21	16–11	2nd	NCAA Division I College World Series	8
2003	Mike Anderson	47–18	20–7	1st	NCAA Division I Regional	13
2004	Mike Anderson	36–23	11–16	8th		12
2005	Mike Anderson	57–15	19–8	1st	NCAA Division I College World Series	5
2006	Mike Anderson	42–17	17–10	3rd	NCAA Division I Regional	15
2007	Mike Anderson	32–27	14–13	4th	NCAA Division I Regional	
2008	Mike Anderson	41–16–1	17–9–1	3rd	NCAA Division I Regional	20
2009	Mike Anderson	25–28–1	8–19	10th		
2010	Mike Anderson	27–27	10–17	9th		
2011	Mike Anderson	30–25	9–17	9th		
Big Ten Conference (2012–present)
2012	Darin Erstad	35–23	14–10	4th		
2013	Darin Erstad	29–30	15–9	2nd		
2014	Darin Erstad	41–21	18–6	2nd	NCAA Division I Regional	
2015	Darin Erstad	34–23	9–14	8th		
2016	Darin Erstad	37–22	16–8	2nd	NCAA Division I Regional	
2017	Darin Erstad	35–22–1	16–7–1	1st	NCAA Division I Regional	
2018	Darin Erstad	24–28	8–14	10th		
2019	Darin Erstad	32–24	15–9	3rd	NCAA Division I Regional	
2020	Will Bolt	7–8	Canceled (COVID-19)			
2021	Will Bolt	34–14	31–12	1st (Note: Big Ten Tournament not held.)	NCAA Division I Regional	20
2022	Will Bolt	23–30	10–14	9th		
2023	Will Bolt	33–23–1	15–9	4th		
2024	Will Bolt	40–22	16–8	2nd	NCAA Division I Regional	
2025	Will Bolt	32–27	15–15	8th	NCAA Division I Regional	
2026	Will Bolt	43–17	23–7	2nd	NCAA Division I Regional	20
