= 2005 Big 12 Conference baseball tournament =

American college baseball tournament

- Teams: 8
- Format: Double elimination
- Finals site: AT&T Bricktown Ballpark; Oklahoma City, Oklahoma
- Champions: Nebraska (4th title)
- Winning coach: Mike Anderson (1st title)
- MVP: Curtis Ledbetter (Nebraska)
- Attendance: 74,439

2005 Big 12 Conference baseball standings
	Conf.						Overall
Team	W		L		T	PCT	W		L		T	PCT
No. 6 Nebraska ‍†‍‡‍^{y}	19	–	8	–	0	.704	57	–	15	–	0	.792
No. 4 Baylor ‍†‍‍^{y}	19	–	8	–	0	.704	46	–	24	–	0	.657
No. 1 Texas ‍‍‍^{y}	16	–	10	–	0	.615	56	–	16	–	0	.778
Missouri ‍‍‍^{y}	16	–	11	–	0	.593	40	–	23	–	0	.635
Oklahoma ‍‍‍^{y}	14	–	13	–	0	.519	35	–	26	–	0	.574
Oklahoma State ‍‍‍	12	–	15	–	0	.444	34	–	25	–	0	.576
Kansas ‍‍‍	11	–	15	–	0	.423	36	–	28	–	0	.563
Texas Tech ‍‍‍	9	–	16	–	0	.360	34	–	25	–	0	.576
Texas A&M ‍‍‍	9	–	18	–	0	.333	30	–	25	–	1	.545
Kansas State ‍‍‍	8	–	19	–	0	.296	30	–	25	–	0	.545
† – Conference champion ‡ – Tournament champion y – Invited to the NCAA tournament Rankings from Collegiate Baseball

The 2005 Big 12 Conference baseball tournament was held at AT&T Bricktown Ballpark in Oklahoma City, OK from May 25 through 29. Nebraska won their fourth tournament in seven years and earned the Big 12 Conference's automatic bid to the 2005 NCAA Division I baseball tournament. This was the last year that the tournament mirrored the format of the College World Series, with two 4-team double-elimination brackets and a final championship game.

== Regular Season Standings ==
Place	Seed	Team	Conference					Overall			
Place	Seed	Team	W	L	T	%	GB	W	L	T	%
1	1	Nebraska	19	8	0	.704	–	57	15	0	.792
1	2	Baylor	19	8	0	.704	–	46	24	0	.657
3	3	Texas	16	10	0	.615	2.5	56	16	0	.778
4	4	Missouri	16	11	0	.593	3	40	23	0	.635
5	5	Oklahoma	14	13	0	.519	5	35	26	0	.574
6	6	Oklahoma State	12	15	0	.444	7	34	25	0	.576
7	7	Kansas	11	15	0	.423	7.5	36	28	0	.563
8	8	Texas Tech	9	16	0	.360	9	34	25	0	.576
9	–	Texas A&M	9	18	0	.333	10	30	25	1	.545
10	–	Kansas State	8	19	0	.296	11	30	25	0	.545

- Colorado and Iowa State did not sponsor baseball teams.

== Tournament ==
First round
6	Oklahoma State	10
3	Texas	4
2	Baylor	2*
7	Kansas	1*
3	Texas	9
7	Kansas	0
4	Missouri	8
5	Oklahoma	7
8	Texas Tech	5
1	Nebraska	3
5	Oklahoma	3
1	Nebraska	6

Second round
6	Oklahoma State	3
2	Baylor	8
3	Texas	6
6	Oklahoma State	1
4	Missouri	10
8	Texas Tech	1
1	Nebraska	2
8	Texas Tech	1

Semifinals
2	Baylor	9	-
3	Texas	8	-
4	Missouri	4	9
1	Nebraska	5	17

Finals
2	Baylor	0
1	Nebraska	1

- * indicates extra-inning game.
- Kansas State and Texas A&M did not make the tournament.

== All-Tournament team ==
Position	Player	School
1B	Curtis Ledbetter	Nebraska
2B	Michael Griffin	Baylor
3B	Alex Gordon	Nebraska
SS	Seth Johnston	Texas
C	Jacob Priday	Missouri
OF	Nick Peoples	Texas
OF	James Boone	Missouri
OF	Andy Gerch	Nebraska
DH	Zane Taylor	Missouri
SP	Randy Boone	Texas
SP	Brian Duensing	Nebraska
RP	Ryan LaMotta	Baylor
UT	Joe Simokaitis	Nebraska
MOP	Curtis Ledbetter	Nebraska

== See also ==
- College World Series
- NCAA Division I Baseball Championship
- Big 12 Conference baseball tournament
