= 2005 NCAA Division I baseball season =

Baseball season

- Duration: January 21-June 26, 2005
- Number of teams: 290
- Preseason No. 1: Cal State Fullerton (NCBWA)

Tournament
- Duration: June 3–June 26, 2005
- Most conference bids: SEC (9)

College World Series
- Duration: June 17–June 26, 2005
- Champions: Texas (6th title)
- Runners-up: Florida (5th CWS Appearance)
- Winning coach: Augie Garrido (5th title)
- MOP: David Maroul (Texas)

Seasons
- ← 2004 2006 →

The 2005 NCAA Division I baseball season play of college baseball in the United States, organized by the National Collegiate Athletic Association (NCAA) at the Division I level, began on January 21, 2005. The season progressed through the regular season, many conference tournaments and championship series, and concluded with the 2005 NCAA Division I baseball tournament and 2005 College World Series. The College World Series, which consisted of the eight remaining teams in the NCAA tournament, was held in its annual location of Omaha, Nebraska, at Rosenblatt Stadium. It concluded on June 26, 2005, with the final game of the best of three championship series. Texas defeated Florida two games to none to claim its sixth championship.

== Realignment ==
=== New programs ===
Four programs joined Division I for the 2005 season, all of which joined from Division II. The four new Division I members were Longwood, North Dakota State, South Dakota State, and UC Davis.

=== Dropped programs ===
Two programs left Division I following the 2004 season. Pace, formerly an Independent, dropped to Division II. Detroit, formerly a member of the Horizon League, discontinued its varsity baseball program.

=== Conference changes ===
The Atlantic Coast Conference added two members prior to the 2005 season. Miami, previously an Independent, and Virginia Tech, previously a member of the Big East Conference, both joined the conference.

Division I's four new members, Longwood, North Dakota State, South Dakota State, and UC Davis, all became independents.

== Conference standings ==
America East Conference
	Conf			Overall		
Team	W	L	Pct	W	L	Pct
Northeastern	14	6	.700	26	23	.531
Maine	14	7	.667	35	19	.648
Vermont	14	7	.667	29	19	.604
Binghamton	12	8	.600	23	26	.469
Albany	10	11	.476	20	19	.513
Stony Brook	10	11	.476	23	28	.451
UMBC	6	15	.286	16	34	.320
Hartford	3	18	.143	6	30	.167

Atlantic Coast Conference
	Conf			Overall		
Team	W	L	Pct	W	L	Pct
Georgia Tech	22	8	.733	45	19	.703
Clemson	21	9	.700	43	23	.652
Miami (FL)	19	10	.655	41	19	.683
Florida State	19	11	.633	53	20	.726
North Carolina	17	10	.630	41	19	.683
North Carolina State	17	13	.567	41	19	.683
Virginia	14	14	.500	41	20	.672
Wake Forest	12	18	.400	28	30	.483
Virginia Tech	7	19	.269	23	28	.451
Maryland	7	23	.233	25	31	.446
Duke	5	25	.167	14	39	.264

Atlantic Sun Conference
	Conf			Overall		
Team	W	L	Pct	W	L	Pct
Troy	23	7	.767	37	21	.638
Central Florida	19	11	.633	42	18	.700
Florida Atlantic	19	11	.633	37	24	.606
Stetson	16	14	.533	35	28	.556
Gardner–Webb	15	15	.500	28	30	.483
Georgia State	15	15	.500	25	32	.439
Campbell	13	17	.433	25	29	.463
Jacksonville	13	17	.433	23	31	.426
Belmont	12	18	.400	28	26	.519
Mercer	12	18	.400	28	26	.519
Lipscomb	8	22	.267	23	33	.411

Atlantic 10 Conference
	Conf			Overall		
Team	W	L	Pct	W	L	Pct
East
Rhode Island	18	6	.750	34	21	.618
Fordham	17	7	.708	34	21	.618
Massachusetts	9	15	.375	16	33	.327
St. Bonaventure	8	16	.333	24	25	.490
Temple	8	16	.333	17	33	.340
Saint Joseph's	8	16	.333	14	38	.269
West
George Washington	17	7	.708	41	19	.683
Dayton	16	8	.667	36	23	.610
Duquesne	13	11	.542	21	34	.382
Richmond	12	12	.500	22	35	.386
Xavier	9	15	.375	19	35	.352
La Salle	9	15	.375	18	34	.346

Big East Conference
	Conf			Overall		
Team	W	L	Pct	W	L	Pct
St. John's	19	4	.826	41	18	.695
Boston College	17	8	.680	37	20	.649
Notre Dame	14	9	.607	38	24	.613
Pittsburgh	15	10	.600	33	22	.600
Rutgers	12	12	.500	32	21	.604
Connecticut	11	12	.478	34	22	.607
West Virginia	10	15	.400	25	30	.455
Villanova	8	16	.333	28	21	.571
Seton Hall	8	17	.320	17	35	.327
Georgetown	7	18	.280	25	31	.446

Big South Conference
	Conf			Overall		
Team	W	L	Pct	W	L	Pct
Coastal Carolina	21	3	.875	50	16	.756
Winthrop	19	5	.792	44	22	.667
Birmingham–Southern	18	6	.750	36	21	.632
Liberty	14	10	.583	36	19	.655
VMI	11	13	.458	27	28	.491
Charleston Southern	8	16	.333	24	29	.453
Radford	8	16	.333	15	40	.273
High Point	6	18	.250	19	36	.345
UNC Asheville	3	21	.125	11	42	.208

Big Ten Conference
	Conf			Overall		
Team	W	L	Pct	W	L	Pct
Illinois	20	12	.625	33	23	.589
Purdue	17	11	.607	27	30	.474
Iowa	19	13	.594	28	29	.491
Michigan	17	12	.586	42	19	.689
Ohio State	17	12	.586	40	20	.667
Minnesota	17	15	.531	33	29	.532
Northwestern	14	18	.438	26	28	.481
Penn State	13	19	.406	28	27	.509
Michigan State	10	18	.357	22	31	.415
Indiana	9	23	.281	26	30	.464

Big 12 Conference
	Conf			Overall		
Team	W	L	Pct	W	L	Pct
Nebraska	19	8	.704	57	15	.792
Baylor	19	8	.704	46	24	.657
Texas	16	10	.615	56	16	.778
Missouri	16	11	.593	40	23	.635
Oklahoma	14	13	.519	35	26	.574
Oklahoma State	12	15	.444	34	25	.576
Kansas	11	15	.423	36	28	.563
Texas Tech	9	16	.360	34	25	.576
Texas A&M	9	18	.333	30	25	.545
Kansas State	8	19	.296	30	25	.545

Big West Conference
	Conf			Overall		
Team	W	L	Pct	W	L	Pct
Cal State Fullerton	16	5	.762	46	18	.719
Cal Poly	14	7	.667	36	20	.643
Long Beach State	14	7	.667	37	22	.627
UC Riverside	11	10	.524	28	27	.509
UC Irvine	10	11	.476	31	25	.554
Pacific	9	12	.429	30	28	.517
UC Santa Barbara	8	13	.381	26	30	.464
Cal State Northridge	2	19	.095	18	36	.333

Colonial Athletic Association
	Conf			Overall		
Team	W	L	Pct	W	L	Pct
UNC Wilmington	21	3	.875	40	19	.678
George Mason	15	9	.625	35	19	.648
Virginia Commonwealth	14	10	.583	33	22	.600
Towson	13	11	.542	34	24	.586
Delaware	13	11	.542	27	31	.466
Hofstra	10	14	.417	24	32	.429
William & Mary	9	15	.375	27	27	.500
James Madison	8	16	.333	20	35	.364
Old Dominion	5	19	.208	22	33	.400

Conference USA
	Conf			Overall		
Team	W	L	Pct	W	L	Pct
Tulane	24	6	.800	56	12	.824
Texas Christian	20	10	.667	41	20	.672
Southern Miss	20	10	.667	41	21	.661
East Carolina	18	12	.600	35	26	.574
Houston	16	13	.552	29	30	.492
Louisville	15	14	.517	32	24	.571
South Florida	15	14	.517	33	31	.516
UAB	14	16	.467	31	27	.534
Charlotte	13	17	.433	31	23	.574
Cincinnati	10	19	.345	25	30	.455
Saint Louis	8	22	.267	13	40	.245
Memphis	5	25	.167	13	42	.236

Horizon League
	Conf			Overall		
Team	W	L	Pct	W	L	Pct
Illinois–Chicago	14	6	.700	38	21	.644
Youngstown State	10	6	.625	29	27	.518
Wisconsin–Milwaukee	12	8	.600	26	31	.456
Wright State	11	9	.550	26	33	.441
Butler	4	12	.250	19	35	.352
Cleveland State	5	15	.250	14	36	.280

Ivy League
	Conf				Overall	
Team	W	L	Pct	W	L	Pct
Lou Gehrig
Cornell	11	9	.550	17	24	.415
Princeton	10	10	.500	17	24	.415
Penn	7	13	.350	11	26	.297
Columbia	5	15	.250	10	31	.244
Red Rolfe
Harvard	15	5	.750	29	17	.630
Brown	14	6	.700	23	19	.548
Yale	10	10	.500	23	17	.575
Dartmouth	8	12	.400	14	21	.400

Metro Atlantic Athletic Conference
	Conf			Overall		
Team	W	L	Pct	W	L	Pct
Marist	22	5	.815	33	21	.611
Siena	19	5	.792	29	23	.558
Manhattan	15	8	.652	27	21	.563
Niagara	16	9	.640	25	28	.472
Le Moyne	14	11	.560	25	22	.532
Rider	14	13	.519	21	29	.420
Fairfield	13	14	.481	15	33	.313
Iona	8	18	.308	11	38	.224
Canisius	5	21	.192	9	38	.191
Saint Peter's	2	24	.077	5	45	.100

Mid-American Conference
	Conf			Overall		
Team	W	L	Pct	W	L	Pct
East
Miami (OH)	17	4	.810	45	18	.714
Akron	11	8	.579	25	29	.463
Kent State	9	10	.474	33	20	.623
Ohio	9	10	.474	25	25	.500
Marshall	8	16	.333	16	34	.320
Buffalo	5	14	.263	19	30	.388
West
Ball State	17	5	.773	38	18	.679
Central Michigan	18	6	.750	42	18	.700
Western Michigan	13	8	.619	26	24	.520
Bowling Green	12	8	.600	33	18	.647
Eastern Michigan	8	14	.364	22	34	.393
Northern Illinois	6	18	.250	16	36	.308
Toledo	5	17	.227	15	39	.278

Mid-Continent Conference
	Conf			Overall		
Team	W	L	Pct	W	L	Pct
Oral Roberts	22	2	.917	42	20	.677
Western Illinois	14	10	.583	24	34	.414
Southern Utah	12	10	.545	26	28	.481
Centenary	12	12	.500	27	30	.474
Valparaiso	10	12	.455	21	31	.404
Oakland	9	15	.375	14	38	.269
Chicago State	3	21	.125	6	50	.107

Mid-Eastern Athletic Conference
	Conf			Overall		
Team	W	L	Pct	W	L	Pct
North Carolina A&T	12	6	.667	27	27	.500
Bethune–Cookman	11	6	.647	22	28	.440
Delaware State	10	7	.588	19	27	.413
Coppin State	10	7	.588	21	31	.404
Florida A&M	9	9	.500	19	33	.365
Norfolk State	8	9	.471	14	36	.280
Maryland–Eastern Shore	1	17	.056	6	41	.128

Missouri Valley Conference
	Conf			Overall		
Team	W	L	Pct	W	L	Pct
Creighton	17	7	.708	48	17	.738
Wichita State	16	8	.667	51	24	.680
Southern Illinois	15	9	.625	38	21	.644
Evansville	12	12	.500	35	23	.603
Bradley	10	14	.417	28	22	.560
Indiana State	10	14	.417	30	28	.517
Missouri State	10	14	.417	26	29	.473
Illinois State	9	15	.375	26	27	.491
Northern Iowa	9	15	.375	26	28	.481

Mountain West Conference
	Conf			Overall		
Team	W	L	Pct	W	L	Pct
UNLV	23	7		35	29	.547
BYU	21	9	.700	39	19	.672
San Diego State	17	13	.567	26	35	.426
New Mexico	15	15	.500	26	32	.448
Utah	10	20	.333	19	36	.345
Air Force	4	26	.133	9	44	.170

Northeast Conference
	Conf			Overall		
Team	W	L	Pct	W	L	Pct
Quinnipiac	17	6	.739	26	24	.520
Sacred Heart	16	8	.667	20	33	.377
Monmouth	15	8	.652	30	24	.556
Wagner	13	10	.565	22	27	.449
Mount St. Mary's	12	11	.522	18	27	.400
Fairleigh Dickinson	10	13	.435	12	26	.316
Central Connecticut	10	14	.417	19	28	.404
Long Island	9	15	.375	13	25	.342
St. Francis (NY)	3	20	.130	7	37	.159

Ohio Valley Conference
	Conf			Overall		
Team	W	L	Pct	W	L	Pct
Jacksonville State	19	8	.704	35	25	.583
Austin Peay	16	11	.593	38	24	.613
Morehead State	15	11	.577	29	28	.509
Murray State	15	12	.556	28	31	.475
Southeast Missouri State	15	12	.556	24	32	.429
Eastern Kentucky	14	12	.538	26	31	.456
Eastern Illinois	14	13	.519	17	39	.304
Samford	13	14	.481	20	36	.357
Tennessee Tech	6	20	.231	13	42	.236
Tennessee–Martin	6	20	.231	12	43	.218

Pacific-10 Conference
	Conf			Overall		
Team	W	L	Pct	W	L	Pct
Oregon State	19	5	.792	46	12	.793
Arizona	17	7	.708	39	21	.650
USC	15	9	.625	41	22	.651
Arizona State	15	9	.625	42	25	.627
California	13	11	.542	34	23	.596
Washington	12	12	.500	33	22	.600
Stanford	12	12	.500	34	25	.576
UCLA	4	20	.167	15	41	.268
Washington State	1	23	.042	21	37	.362

Patriot League
	Conf			Overall		
Team	W	L	Pct	W	L	Pct
Army	17	3	.850	39	14	.736
Lehigh	12	8	.600	26	21	.553
Bucknell	10	10	.500	16	26	.381
Lafayette	6	10	.375	18	26	.409
Holy Cross	5	11	.313	13	23	.361
Navy	6	14	.300	12	33	.267

Southeastern Conference
Team	W	L	Pct	W	L	Pct
East
Florida	20	10	.667	48	23	.676
Tennessee	18	11	.621	46	21	.687
South Carolina	16	14	.533	41	23	.641
Vanderbilt	13	17	.433	34	21	.618
Georgia	12	17	.414	30	25	.545
Kentucky	7	22	.241	29	27	.518
West
Ole Miss	18	12	.600	48	20	.706
LSU	18	12	.600	40	22	.645
Alabama	17	13	.567	40	23	.635
Mississippi State	13	16	.448	42	22	.656
Arkansas	13	17	.433	39	22	.639
Auburn	13	17	.433	34	26	.567

Southern Conference
	Conf			Overall		
Team	W	L	Pct	W	L	Pct
College of Charleston	27	3	.900	48	15	.762
Georgia Southern	18	11	.621	38	22	.633
Western Carolina	18	12	.600	33	23	.589
Elon	18	12	.600	32	25	.561
UNC Greensboro	17	13	.567	31	22	.585
The Citadel	14	16	.467	25	34	.424
East Tennessee State	13	16	.448	31	22	.585
Furman	13	16	.448	30	29	.508
Davidson	13	17	.433	26	24	.520
Wofford	7	23	.233	17	37	.315
Appalachian State	5	24	.172	10	42	.192

Southland Conference
	Conf			Overall		
Team	W	L	Pct	W	L	Pct
Northwestern State	22	5	.815	41	20	.672
Lamar	16	11	.593	38	23	.623
Texas State	15	12	.556	32	26	.552
Texas–Arlington	14	13	.519	26	32	.448
Texas–San Antonio	14	13	.519	27	34	.443
Southeastern Louisiana	13	14	.481	29	31	.483
Sam Houston State	13	14	.481	24	29	.453
McNeese State	12	15	.444	23	31	.426
Louisiana–Monroe	9	18	.333	26	29	.473
Nicholls State	7	20	.259	22	31	.415

Southwestern Athletic Conference
	Conf			Overall		
Team	W	L	Pct	W	L	Pct
East
Mississippi Valley State	18	6	.750	19	30	.388
Alcorn State	14	9	.609	22	18	.550
Jackson State	14	9	.609	24	22	.522
Alabama State	11	13	.458	15	28	.349
Alabama A&M	2	22	.083	10	32	.238
West
Southern	17	7	.708	29	18	.617
Texas Southern	17	7	.708	22	25	.468
Prairie View A&M	13	11	.542	31	27	.534
Grambling State	7	16	.304	12	31	.279
Arkansas–Pine Bluff	5	18	.217	9	39	.188

Sun Belt Conference
	Conf			Overall		
Team	W	L	Pct	W	L	Pct
Louisiana–Lafayette	16	8	.667	48	19	.716
South Alabama	15	9	.625	35	27	.565
Florida International	14	10	.583	38	21	.644
Middle Tennessee	13	10	.565	32	23	.582
New Mexico State	13	11	.542	28	29	.491
Arkansas State	12	12	.500	33	23	.589
New Orleans	10	14	.417	20	39	.339
Western Kentucky	8	16	.333	21	37	.362
Arkansas–Little Rock	6	17		23	33	.411

Western Athletic Conference
	Conf			Overall		
Team	W	L	Pct	W	L	Pct
Rice	21	9	.700	45	19	.703
Fresno State	16	14	.533	30	29	.508
Hawaii	15	14	.517	28	27	.509
Nevada	15	15	.500	26	27	.491
San Jose State	13	17	.433	28	28	.500
Louisiana Tech	9	20	.310	17	39	.304

West Coast Conference
	Conf			Overall		
Team	W	L	Pct	W	L	Pct
Coast
Loyola Marymount	18	12	.600	31	27	.534
San Diego	16	14	.533	30	27	.526
Gonzaga	15	15	.500	28	26	.519
Saint Mary's	12	18	.400	20	30	.400
West
Pepperdine	21	9	.700	41	23	.641
San Francisco	20	10	.667	38	18	.679
Santa Clara	11	19	.367	28	28	.500
Portland	7	23	.233	17	36	.321

Division I Independents
Team	W	L	Pct
Texas A&M–Corpus Christi	31	21	.596
Dallas Baptist	32	23	.582
NYIT	24	22	.522
Savannah State	22	21	.512
IPFW	24	25	.490
UC Davis	27	29	.482
Northern Colorado	22	34	.393
Sacramento State	20	36	.357
Longwood	16	32	.333
South Dakota State	17	38	.309
Utah Valley	17	39	.304
Texas–Pan American	15	39	.278
North Dakota State	10	43	.189
Hawaii–Hilo	6	35	.146

Team won the conference tournament and the automatic bid to the NCAA tournament
Conference does not have conference tournament, so team won the autobid for finishing in first
Team received at-large bid to NCAA tournament

== College World Series ==
The 2005 season marked the fifty ninth NCAA baseball tournament, which culminated with the eight team College World Series. The College World Series was held in Omaha, Nebraska. The eight teams played a double-elimination format, with Texas claiming their sixth championship with a two games to none series win over Florida in the final.

=== Bracket ===
First round
Tennessee	4
7	Florida	6
Arizona State	3
3	Nebraska	5
Tennessee	2
Arizona State	4
8	Oregon State	1
1	Tulane	3
Texas	5
4	Baylor	1
8	Oregon State	3
4	Baylor	4^{10}

Second round
7	Florida	7
3	Nebraska	4
Arizona State	8^{11}
3	Nebraska	7
1	Tulane	0
Texas	5
4	Baylor	8
1	Tulane	7

Semifinals
7	Florida	1	6
Arizona State	6	3
Texas	4	—
4	Baylor	3	—

Finals
7	Florida	2	2	—
Texas	4	6	—
