= List of Nebraska Cornhuskers head baseball coaches =

This list of Nebraska Cornhuskers head baseball coaches shows the coaches or managers who have led the University of Nebraska–Lincoln's baseball program in a permanent or interim capacity. Nebraska has had twenty-six full-time head coaches and has been led by Will Bolt since 2020.

== History ==
In its early years, Nebraska's program cycled through head coaches, most of whom led the program for a single year. The Cornhuskers competed as an independent until 1929, when John Rhodes led the team to the MVIAA championship. W. W. Knight, hired forty-four years after the program's first season of competition, was Nebraska's first head coach to hold the position for more than three years.

After decades of heavy coaching turnover, the hire of Tony Sharpe in 1947 brought stability to the program for the first time; Sharpe and his successor John Sanders led Nebraska for a combined fifty-one years. However, this consistency did not translate to on-field success, as the two coaches combined for just three NCAA Tournament appearances. NU's first national success arrived with the hire of Dave Van Horn in 1998, who took the program to its first College World Series appearances in 2001 and 2002. When Van Horn resigned to return to his alma mater Arkansas after the 2002 season, assistant Mike Anderson succeeded him and led NU to a program-record fifty-seven wins and another College World Series appearance in 2005.

== Coaching history ==
No.	Coach (Note: Coaching information not available from 1899, 1900, 1905, 1907, or 1912. Nebraska did not field a team in 1903, from 1913 to 1918, from 1926 to 1928, in 1932, or from 1943 to 1945.)	Tenure	Overall	Conference (Note: Nebraska competed as an independent until 1929.)	Accomplishments
1	C. D. Chandler	1889–1891	4–5 (.444)		
2	Charles Stroman	1892–1893	3–2–1 (.583)		
3	Edward N. Robinson	1897	8–5–1 (.607)		
4	F. B. Ryons	1898	6–4 (.600)		
5	Mike Henderson	1901	9–11 (.450)		
6	Geo P. Shidler	1902	17–8 (.680)		
7	J. H. Bell	1904	10–3 (.769)		
8	S. S. Eager	1906	5–12–1 (.306)		
9	Ducky Holmes	1907	5–11–1 (.324)		
10	Billy Fox	1908–1909	16–26–2 (.386)		
11	Paul J. Schissler	1919–1921	20–14 (.588)		
12	Owen Frank	1922	12–4 (.750)		
13	Scotty Dye	1923 (Note: Scotty Dye and Earl Carr each separately coached part of the 1923 season.)	4–4 (.500)		
14	Earl Carr	1923	2–8 (.200)		
15	William G. Kline	1924–1925	18–15 (.545)		
16	John Rhodes	1929–1930	12–12–1 (.500)	17–10 (.630)	1x MVIAA champion
17	W. H. Browne	1931	2–10 (.167)	2–8 (.200)	
18	W. W. Knight	1933–1941	38–92 (.292)	24–61 (.282)	
19	Adolph J. Lewandowski	1942	3–11 (.214)	3–6 (.333)	
20	Frank Smagacz	1946	9–7 (.563)	9–5 (.643)	
21	Tony Sharpe	1947–1977	399–389–6 (.506)	240–260 (.480)	2x MVIAA champion
22	John Sanders	1978–1997	767–453–1 (.629)	239–221 (.520)	1x Big Eight champion
23	Dave Van Horn	1998–2002	214–92 (.699)	83–50 (.624)	2x College World Series; 1x Big 12 champion 3x Big 12 tournament champion 1x National coach of the year
24	Mike Anderson	2003–2011	337–196–2 (.632)	125–116–1 (.519)	1x College World Series; 2x Big 12 champion 1x Big 12 tournament champion
25	Darin Erstad	2012–2019	267–193–1 (.580)	111–77–1 (.590)	1x Big Ten champion
26	Will Bolt	2020–present	174–129–1 (.574)	87–58 (.600)	1x Big Ten champion 2x Big Ten tournament champion
