= 2005 Baylor Bears baseball team =

American college baseball season

2005 Baylor Bears baseball

Big 12 Regular Season Champions

College World Series, 3rd
- Conference: Big 12 Conference
- South

Ranking
- Coaches: No. 4
- CB: No. 4
- Record: 46–24 (19–8 Big 12)
- Head coach: Steve Smith (11th season)
- Hitting coach: Mitch Thompson (11th season)
- Pitching coach: Steve Johnigan (11th season)
- Home stadium: Baylor Ballpark

2005 Big 12 Conference baseball standings
| | Conf. | | | | | | Overall |
| Team | W | | L | | T | PCT | W | | L | | T | PCT |
|---|---|---|---|---|---|---|---|---|---|---|---|---|
| No. 6 Nebraska ‍†‍‡‍^{y} | 19 | – | 8 | – | 0 | .704 | 57 | – | 15 | – | 0 | .792 |
| No. 4 Baylor ‍†‍‍^{y} | 19 | – | 8 | – | 0 | .704 | 46 | – | 24 | – | 0 | .657 |
| No. 1 Texas ‍‍‍^{y} | 16 | – | 10 | – | 0 | .615 | 56 | – | 16 | – | 0 | .778 |
| Missouri ‍‍‍^{y} | 16 | – | 11 | – | 0 | .593 | 40 | – | 23 | – | 0 | .635 |
| Oklahoma ‍‍‍^{y} | 14 | – | 13 | – | 0 | .519 | 35 | – | 26 | – | 0 | .574 |
| Oklahoma State ‍‍‍ | 12 | – | 15 | – | 0 | .444 | 34 | – | 25 | – | 0 | .576 |
| Kansas ‍‍‍ | 11 | – | 15 | – | 0 | .423 | 36 | – | 28 | – | 0 | .563 |
| Texas Tech ‍‍‍ | 9 | – | 16 | – | 0 | .360 | 34 | – | 25 | – | 0 | .576 |
| Texas A&M ‍‍‍ | 9 | – | 18 | – | 0 | .333 | 30 | – | 25 | – | 1 | .545 |
| Kansas State ‍‍‍ | 8 | – | 19 | – | 0 | .296 | 30 | – | 25 | – | 0 | .545 |
† – Conference champion ‡ – Tournament champion y – Invited to the NCAA tournament Rankings from Collegiate Baseball

The 2005 Baylor Bears baseball team represented Baylor University in the 2005 NCAA Division I baseball season. The head coach was Steve Smith, serving his 11th year. The team played its home games at Baylor Ballpark in Waco, Texas.

== Season summary ==
The Bears played one of the toughest schedules in the nation and managed a 39–21 record going into NCAA postseason play. The team won the Big 12 Conference behind a 19–8 conference record and hosted an NCAA Regional in Waco. The Bears defeated UTSA, TCU, and Stanford, to progress to an NCAA Super Regional. The Clemson Tigers, out of the ACC Conference, came to Waco for the two-of-three series. The Bears lost the Saturday night game but rebounded on Sunday and Monday to advance to the 2005 College World Series.

In the CWS, the Bears were matched against the University of Texas, whom they had beaten 3 times during conference play. The Longhorns defeated the Bears in Game 1, putting Baylor into an elimination bracket with Oregon State. In an extra innings contest, the Bears defeated Oregon State, 4–3, to advance to play #1 Tulane. After being down 7-0 early in the game, Baylor scored 8 runs in the 7th, 8th, and 9th innings, including 3 runs in the 9th, to beat the highly ranked Green Wave, 8–7. In a rematch against the University of Texas, Baylor led 3–2 in the 8th inning, but fell to the Longhorns 4–3 to end the season. The strength of the 2005 team was their pitching, with a weekend rotation of Trey Taylor, Cory VanAllen, and Mark McCormick with closers Abe Woody and Ryan LaMotta. The offense was criticized heavily in the regular season for lack of power, but produced in postseason play. Many players from this team continue to play baseball.

== Roster ==
2005 Baylor Bears baseball team
Players
Coaches

| # | Pos. | Name | B/T | Height | Weight | Year | Home town |
|---|---|---|---|---|---|---|---|
| | INF | Wes Bennefield | / | — | — | Fr | Franklin, Tennessee |
| | INF | Drew Bias | / | — | — | Fr | Pflugerville, Texas |
| | OF | Reid Brees | / | — | — | Sr | Austin, Texas |
| | RHP | Tyler Bullock | R/R | 6 ft 3 in (1.91 m) | 225 lb (102 kg) | Jr | Fort Worth, Texas |
| | RHP | Nick Cassavechia | R/R | 6 ft 0 in (1.83 m) | 185 lb (84 kg) | Fr | Dallas, Texas |
| | C | Zach Dillon | L/R | 5 ft 10 in (1.78 m) | 210 lb (95 kg) | Jr | Urbandale, Iowa |
| | C | Josh Ford | R/R | 6 ft 1 in (1.85 m) | 225 lb (102 kg) | Sr | Baytown, Texas |
| | OF | Seth Fortenberry | L/L | 6 ft 2 in (1.88 m) | 175 lb (79 kg) | Jr | Waco, Texas |
| | RHP | Kerr Foster | /R | — | — | Fr | Athens, Texas |
| | OF | Chase Gerdes | / | — | — | So | Uvalde, Texas |
| | INF | Michael Griffin | R/R | 5 ft 9 in (1.75 m) | 200 lb (91 kg) | Sr | Dallas, Texas |
| | RHP | Ryan LaMotta | R/R | 5 ft 10 in (1.78 m) | 200 lb (91 kg) | Jr | Sugar Land, Texas |
| | RHP | Randall Linebaugh | R/R | 6 ft 0 in (1.83 m) | 170 lb (77 kg) | Sr | Mesquite, Texas |
| | RHP | Jeff Mandel | S/R | 6 ft 3 in (1.91 m) | 190 lb (86 kg) | Sr | Houston, Texas |
| | LHP | Xerxer Martin | /L | — | — | Fr | Dallas, Texas |
| | RHP | Mark McCormick | R/R | 6 ft 2 in (1.88 m) | 195 lb (88 kg) | Jr | Houston, Texas |
| | OF | Paul Miles | / | — | — | Fr | Houston, Texas |
| | OF | Mike Pankratz | / | — | — | Jr | Houston, Texas |
| | RHP | Andy Pape | /R | — | — | Jr | San Antonio, Texas |
| | INF | Kyle Reynolds | L/R | 6 ft 2 in (1.88 m) | 190 lb (86 kg) | Jr | Houston, Texas |
| | INF | Jake Rippee | / | — | — | So | Kerrville, Texas |
| | INF | Kevin Russo | R/R | 5 ft 11 in (1.8 m) | 190 lb (86 kg) | Jr | Boulder, Colorado |
| | OF | Kevin Sevigny | / | — | — | Jr | Springvale, Maine |
| | LHP | Trey Taylor | R/L | 6 ft 2 in (1.88 m) | 200 lb (91 kg) | Sr | Mansfield, Texas |
| | INF | Jason Thompson | / | — | — | So | Euless, Texas |
| | LHP | Cory VanAllen | L/L | 6 ft 3 in (1.91 m) | 180 lb (82 kg) | So | Sugar Land, Texas |
| | RHP | Sean Walker | R/R | 6 ft 1 in (1.85 m) | 175 lb (79 kg) | Sr | La Mesa, California |
| | INF | Paul Witt | R/R | 5 ft 11 in (1.8 m) | 180 lb (82 kg) | Sr | Pine Bluff, Arkansas |
| | RHP | Abe Woody | R/R | 5 ft 11 in (1.8 m) | 200 lb (91 kg) | Jr | Round Rock, Texas |

Head coach

Steve Smith

Assistant coach(es)

Chris Berry

Hitting coach(es)

Mitch Thompson

Pitching coach(es)

Steve Johnigan

Legend

- (C) Team captain
- (S) Suspended
- (I) Ineligible
- Injured
- Current redshirt

== Schedule ==
2005 Baylor Bears baseball game log
Regular season
February (6–4)

| # | Date | Opponent | Site/stadium | Score | Overall record | Big 12 record |
|---|---|---|---|---|---|---|
| 1 | February 11 | vs Houston | Minute Maid Park • Houston, Texas | 8–6 | 1–0 | – |
| 2 | February 12 | vs Tennessee | Minute Maid Park • Houston, Texas | 3–2 | 2–0 | – |
| 3 | February 13 | at Rice | Minute Maid Park • Houston, Texas | 6–1 | 3–0 | – |
| 4 | February 15 | UT Arlington | Baylor Ballpark • Waco, Texas | 6–9 | 3–1 | – |
| 5 | February 18 | Oral Roberts | Baylor Ballpark • Waco, Texas | 3–9 | 3–2 | – |
| 6 | February 19 | Oral Roberts | Baylor Ballpark • Waco, Texas | 2–1 | 4–2 | – |
| 7 | February 20 | Oral Roberts | Baylor Ballpark • Waco, Texas | 4–0 | 5–2 | – |
| 8 | February 25 | at Arizona State | Packard Stadium • Tempe, Arizona | 3–5 | 5–3 | – |
| 9 | February 26 | at Arizona State | Packard Stadium • Tempe, Arizona | 4–12 | 5–4 | – |
| 10 | February 27 | at Arizona State | Packard Stadium • Tempe, Arizona | 8–7 | 6–4 | – |

March (12–5)

| # | Date | Opponent | Site/stadium | Score | Overall record | Big 12 record |
|---|---|---|---|---|---|---|
| 11 | March 1 | at UTSA | Roadrunner Field • San Antonio, Texas | 4–2 | 7–4 | – |
| 12 | March 4 | Long Beach State | Baylor Ballpark • Waco, Texas | 2–4 | 7–5 | – |
| 13 | March 5 | Long Beach State | Baylor Ballpark • Waco, Texas | 6–7 | 7–6 | – |
| 14 | March 6 | Long Beach State | Baylor Ballpark • Waco, Texas | 7–1 | 8–6 | – |
| 15 | March 8 | Northwestern State | Baylor Ballpark • Waco, Texas | 4–5 | 8–7 | – |
| 16 | March 11 | at Vanderbilt | McGugin Field • Nashville, Tennessee | 9–4 | 9–7 | – |
| 17 | March 12 | at Vanderbilt | McGugin Field • Nashville, Tennessee | 16–5 | 10–7 | – |
| 18 | March 13 | at Vanderbilt | McGugin Field • Nashville, Tennessee | 4–1 | 11–7 | – |
| 19 | March 13 | TCU | Baylor Ballpark • Waco, Texas | 4–3 | 12–7 | – |
| 20 | March 18 | at Texas | Disch-Falk Field • Austin, Texas | 3–2 | 13–7 | 1–0 |
| 21 | March 19 | Texas | Baylor Ballpark • Waco Texas | 9–1 | 14–7 | 2–0 |
| 22 | March 20 | Texas | Baylor Ballpark • Waco Texas | 4–3 | 15–7 | 3–0 |
| 23 | March 22 | at Texas State | Bobcat Field • San Marcos, Texas | 4–3 | 16–7 | 3–0 |
| 24 | March 25 | at Oklahoma State | Allie P. Reynolds Stadium • Stillwater, Oklahoma | 1–7 | 16–8 | 3–1 |
| 25 | March 26 | at Oklahoma State | Allie P. Reynolds Stadium • Stillwater, Oklahoma | 6–3 | 17–8 | 4–1 |
| 26 | March 27 | at Oklahoma State | Allie P. Reynolds Stadium • Stillwater, Oklahoma | 2–3 | 17–9 | 4–2 |
| 27 | March 29 | Texas Southern | Baylor Ballpark • Waco, Texas | 10–3 | 18–9 | 4–2 |

April (12–7)

| # | Date | Opponent | Site/stadium | Score | Overall record | Big 12 record |
|---|---|---|---|---|---|---|
| 28 | April 1 | Oklahoma | Baylor Ballpark • Waco, Texas | 5–3 | 19–9 | 5–2 |
| 29 | April 2 | Oklahoma | Baylor Ballpark • Waco, Texas | 2–5 | 19–10 | 5–3 |
| 30 | April 3 | Oklahoma | Baylor Ballpark • Waco, Texas | 6–2 | 20–10 | 6–3 |
| 31 | April 5 | Houston | Baylor Ballpark • Waco, Texas | 3–9 | 20–11 | 6–3 |
| 32 | April 8 | Kansas State | Baylor Ballpark • Waco, Texas | 8–3 | 21–11 | 7–3 |
| 33 | April 9 | Kansas State | Baylor Ballpark • Waco, Texas | 11–3 | 22–11 | 8–3 |
| 34 | April 10 | Kansas State | Baylor Ballpark • Waco, Texas | 8–4 | 23–11 | 9–3 |
| 35 | April 12 | at UT Arlington | Clay Gould Ballpark • Arlington, Texas | 0–2 | 23–12 | 9–3 |
| 36 | April 15 | at Kansas | Hoglund Ballpark • Lawrence, Kansas | 8–4 | 24–12 | 10–3 |
| 37 | April 16 | at Kansas | Hoglund Ballpark • Lawrence, Kansas | 13–2 | 25–12 | 11–3 |
| 38 | April 17 | at Kansas | Hoglund Ballpark • Lawrence, Kansas | 3–2 | 26–12 | 12–3 |
| 39 | April 19 | at TCU | Lupton Stadium • Fort Worth, Texas | 1–2 | 26–13 | 12–3 |
| 40 | April 20 | Prairie View A&M | Baylor Ballpark • Waco, Texas | 4–3 | 27–13 | 12–3 |
| 41 | April 22 | at Nebraska | Haymarket Park • Lincoln, Nebraska | 4–8 | 27–14 | 12–4 |
| 42 | April 23 | at Nebraska | Haymarket Park • Lincoln, Nebraska | 4–1 | 28–14 | 13–4 |
| 43 | April 24 | at Nebraska | Haymarket Park • Lincoln, Nebraska | 3–4 | 28–15 | 13–5 |
| 44 | April 26 | UT Arlington | Baylor Ballpark • Waco, Texas | 8–5 | 29–15 | 13–5 |
| 45 | April 29 | Texas Tech | Baylor Ballpark • Waco, Texas | 6–1 | 30–15 | 14–5 |
| 46 | April 30 | Texas Tech | Baylor Ballpark • Waco, Texas | 2–3 | 30–16 | 14–6 |

May (7–3)

| # | Date | Opponent | Site/stadium | Score | Overall record | Big 12 record |
|---|---|---|---|---|---|---|
| 47 | May 1 | Texas Tech | Baylor Ballpark • Waco, Texas | 8–5 | 31–16 | 15–6 |
| 48 | May 3 | UTSA | Baylor Ballpark • Waco, Texas | 6–5 | 32–16 | 15–6 |
| 49 | May 11 | at Rice | Reckling Park • Houston, Texas | 0–7 | 32–17 | 15–6 |
| 50 | May 13 | Texas A&M | Baylor Ballpark • Waco, Texas | 10–9 | 33–17 | 16–6 |
| 51 | May 14 | at Texas A&M | Olsen Field at Blue Bell Park • College Station, Texas | 3–1 | 34–17 | 17–6 |
| 52 | May 15 | at Texas A&M | Olsen Field at Blue Bell Park • College Station, Texas | 6–4 | 35–17 | 18–6 |
| 53 | May 17 | Texas State | Baylor Ballpark • Waco, Texas | 7–4 | 36–17 | 18–6 |
| 54 | May 20 | Missouri | Baylor Ballpark • Waco, Texas | 7–5 | 37–17 | 19–6 |
| 55 | May 21 | Missouri | Baylor Ballpark • Waco, Texas | 4–7 | 37–18 | 19–7 |
| 56 | May 22 | Missouri | Baylor Ballpark • Waco, Texas | 4–10 | 37–19 | 19–8 |

Postseason
Big 12 Conference Tournament (3–1)

| # | Date | Opponent | Site/stadium | Score | Overall record | Big 12 record |
|---|---|---|---|---|---|---|
| 57 | May 25 | vs Kansas | AT&T Bricktown Ballpark • Oklahoma City, Oklahoma | 2–1 | 38–19 | 19–8 |
| 58 | May 26 | vs Oklahoma State | AT&T Bricktown Ballpark • Oklahoma City, Oklahoma | 8–3 | 39–19 | 19–8 |
| 59 | May 28 | vs Texas | AT&T Bricktown Ballpark • Oklahoma City, Oklahoma | 9–8 | 40–19 | 19–8 |
| 60 | May 29 | vs Nebraska | AT&T Bricktown Ballpark • Oklahoma City, Oklahoma | 0–1 | 40–20 | 19–8 |

NCAA Regional (3–0)

| # | Date | Opponent | Site/stadium | Score | Overall record | Big 12 record |
|---|---|---|---|---|---|---|
| 61 | June 4 | UTSA | Baylor Ballpark • Waco, Texas | 8–3 | 41–20 | 19–8 |
| 62 | June 5 | TCU | Baylor Ballpark • Waco, Texas | 8–3 | 42–20 | 19–8 |
| 63 | June 6 | Stanford | Baylor Ballpark • Waco, Texas | 4–3 | 43–20 | 19–8 |

NCAA Super Regional (2–1)

| # | Date | Opponent | Site/stadium | Score | Overall record | Big 12 record |
|---|---|---|---|---|---|---|
| 64 | June 11 | Clemson | Baylor Ballpark • Waco, Texas | 2–4 | 43–21 | 19–8 |
| 65 | June 12 | Clemson | Baylor Ballpark • Waco, Texas | 7–1 | 44–21 | 19–8 |
| 66 | June 13 | Clemson | Baylor Ballpark • Waco, Texas | 6–1 | 45–21 | 19–8 |

2005 College World Series (2–2)

| # | Date | Opponent | Site/stadium | Score | Overall record | Big 12 record |
|---|---|---|---|---|---|---|
| 67 | June 18 | vs Texas | Johnny Rosenblatt Stadium • Omaha, Nebraska | 1–5 | 45–22 | 19–8 |
| 68 | June 20 | vs Oregon State | Johnny Rosenblatt Stadium • Omaha, Nebraska | 4–3 | 46–22 | 19–8 |
| 69 | June 21 | vs Tulane | Johnny Rosenblatt Stadium • Omaha, Nebraska | 8–7 | 47–22 | 19–8 |
| 70 | June 22 | vs Texas | Johnny Rosenblatt Stadium • Omaha, Nebraska | 3–4 | 47–23 | 19–8 |
