= 2005 Texas Longhorns baseball team =

American college baseball season

2005 Texas Longhorns baseball

National champions
- Conference: Big 12 Conference

Ranking
- Coaches: No. 1
- CB: No. 1
- Record: 56–16 (16–10 Big 12)
- Head coach: Augie Garrido (9th season)
- Assistant coaches: Tommy Harmon (16th season); Tom Holliday (2nd season)
- Home stadium: Disch–Falk Field

2005 Big 12 Conference baseball standings
	Conf.						Overall
Team	W		L		T	PCT	W		L		T	PCT
No. 6 Nebraska ‍†‍‡‍^{y}	19	–	8	–	0	.704	57	–	15	–	0	.792
No. 4 Baylor ‍†‍‍^{y}	19	–	8	–	0	.704	46	–	24	–	0	.657
No. 1 Texas ‍‍‍^{y}	16	–	10	–	0	.615	56	–	16	–	0	.778
Missouri ‍‍‍^{y}	16	–	11	–	0	.593	40	–	23	–	0	.635
Oklahoma ‍‍‍^{y}	14	–	13	–	0	.519	35	–	26	–	0	.574
Oklahoma State ‍‍‍	12	–	15	–	0	.444	34	–	25	–	0	.576
Kansas ‍‍‍	11	–	15	–	0	.423	36	–	28	–	0	.563
Texas Tech ‍‍‍	9	–	16	–	0	.360	34	–	25	–	0	.576
Texas A&M ‍‍‍	9	–	18	–	0	.333	30	–	25	–	1	.545
Kansas State ‍‍‍	8	–	19	–	0	.296	30	–	25	–	0	.545
† – Conference champion ‡ – Tournament champion y – Invited to the NCAA tournament Rankings from Collegiate Baseball

The 2005 Texas Longhorns baseball team represented the University of Texas in the 2005 NCAA Division I baseball season. The Longhorns played their home games at UFCU Disch-Falk Field. The team was coached by Augie Garrido in his 9th season at Texas.

The Longhorns won the College World Series, defeating the Florida Gators in the championship series. This just so happened to coincide with the title success of the football team that same year.

== Roster ==
2005 Texas Longhorns baseball team
Players
Coaches

#	Pos.	Name	B/T	Height	Weight	Year	Home town
3	RHP	Adrian Alaniz	R/R	6 ft 2 in (1.88 m)	202 lb (92 kg)	Fr	Sinton, TX
15	OF	Calvin Beamon	L/L	6 ft 1 in (1.85 m)	195 lb (88 kg)	Jr	Aurora, CO
40	RHP	Drew Bishop	R/R	6 ft 0 in (1.83 m)	182 lb (83 kg)	Fr	Rockwall, TX
36	RHP	Randy Boone	R/R	6 ft 3 in (1.91 m)	199 lb (90 kg)	So	Yoakum, TX
14	C	Preston Clark	R/R	5 ft 11 in (1.8 m)	199 lb (90 kg)	Fr	Rockwall, TX
46	LHP	Buck Cody	L/L	6 ft 2 in (1.88 m)	201 lb (91 kg)	Sr	Oklahoma City, OK
44	RHP	J. B. Cox	R/R	6 ft 4 in (1.93 m)	206 lb (93 kg)	Jr	Bay City, TX
26	INF	Will Crouch	R/R	6 ft 3 in (1.91 m)	224 lb (102 kg)	Sr	Austin, TX
33	RHP	Brent Dawson	R/R	6 ft 1 in (1.85 m)	205 lb (93 kg)	Jr	San Antonio, TX
28	RHP	Zach Gallenkamp	R/R	6 ft 0 in (1.83 m)	206 lb (93 kg)	So	Austin, TX
4	C	Todd Gilfillan	R/R	6 ft 2 in (1.88 m)	193 lb (88 kg)	Fr	Austin, TX
24	LHP	Bryan Herrera	L/L	5 ft 9 in (1.75 m)	182 lb (83 kg)	Jr	Austin, TX
6	INF	Robby Hudson	R/R	6 ft 0 in (1.83 m)	165 lb (75 kg)	Sr	Redlands, CA
29	OF	Thomas Incaviglia	S/R	6 ft 3 in (1.91 m)	193 lb (88 kg)	So	Monterey, CA
2	INF	Seth Johnston	R/R	6 ft 3 in (1.91 m)	200 lb (91 kg)	Sr	Boerne, TX
32	OF	Carson Kainer	R/R	6 ft 2 in (1.88 m)	202 lb (92 kg)	So	Tomball, TX
30	RHP	Kenn Kasparek	R/R	6 ft 10 in (2.08 m)	235 lb (107 kg)	Fr	Weimar, TX
35	C	Pack Landfair	R/R	6 ft 1 in (1.85 m)	211 lb (96 kg)	Sr	Springfield, VA
8	INF	David Maroul	R/R	6 ft 2 in (1.88 m)	215 lb (98 kg)	Sr	Benbrook, TX
23	RHP	Kyle McCulloch	R/R	6 ft 3 in (1.91 m)	178 lb (81 kg)	So	Houston, TX
1	INF	Nick Peoples	R/R	5 ft 11 in (1.8 m)	186 lb (84 kg)	So	Round Rock, TX
7	LHP	Dooley Prince	L/L	5 ft 10 in (1.78 m)	183 lb (83 kg)	Sr	Sulphur, LA
48	RHP	Andy Reese	R/R	6 ft 0 in (1.83 m)	188 lb (85 kg)	Fr	Austin, TX
47	RHP	Clayton Stewart	R/R	6 ft 5 in (1.96 m)	225 lb (102 kg)	Sr	Angleton, TX
5	LHP	Jordon Street	L/L	5 ft 10 in (1.78 m)	167 lb (76 kg)	Fr	Austin, TX
27	RHP	Juston Street	R/R	6 ft 2 in (1.88 m)	190 lb (86 kg)	Fr	Austin, TX
13	OF	Drew Stubbs	R/R	6 ft 4 in (1.93 m)	199 lb (90 kg)	So	Atlanta, TX
31	C	Taylor Teagarden	R/R	6 ft 1 in (1.85 m)	201 lb (91 kg)	Jr	Carrollton, TX
9	INF	Clay Van Hook	R/R	5 ft 9 in (1.75 m)	160 lb (73 kg)	So	Brenham, TX
34	INF	Chance Wheeless	L/L	6 ft 5 in (1.96 m)	207 lb (94 kg)	So	Round Rock, TX

Head coach

16 Augie Garrido (9th year)

Assistant coach(es)

22 Tommy Harmon (16th year)
50 Tom Holliday (2nd year)

Legend

- (C) Team captain
- (S) Suspended
- (I) Ineligible
- Injured
- Current redshirt

== Schedule ==
2005 Texas Longhorns baseball game log (56–16)
Regular season (43–12)
February (15–0)

Date	Opponent	Rank	Site/stadium	Score	Overall record	Big 12 record
February 4	at San Diego State	No. 1	Tony Gwynn Stadium	W 7–3	1–0	–
February 5	at San Diego State	No. 1	Tony Gwynn Stadium	W 13–5	2–0	–
February 6	at San Diego State	No. 1	Tony Gwynn Stadium	W 7–0	3–0	–
February 9	Texas–Pan American	No. 1	Disch–Falk Field	W 7–1	4–0	–
February 11	UNLV	No. 1	Disch–Falk Field	W 4–3	5–0	–
February 12	UNLV	No. 1	Disch–Falk Field	W 7–6	6–0	–
February 13	UNLV	No. 1	Disch–Falk Field	W 12–3	7–0	–
February 15	UTSA	No. 1	Disch–Falk Field	W 10–0	8–0	–
February 18	No. 6 Stanford	No. 1	Disch–Falk Field	W 5–4	9–0	–
February 19	No. 6 Stanford	No. 1	Disch–Falk Field	W 8–7	10–0	–
February 20	No. 6 Stanford	No. 1	Disch–Falk Field	W 5–4	11–0	–
February 22	Texas–Arlington	No. 1	Disch–Falk Field	W 5–4	12–0	–
February 25	Youngstown State	No. 1	Disch–Falk Field	W 14–0	13–0	–
February 27	Youngstown State	No. 1	Disch–Falk Field	W 8–0	14–0	–
February 27	Youngstown State	No. 1	Disch–Falk Field	W 8–2	15–0	–

March (9–4)

Date	Opponent	Rank	Site/stadium	Score	Overall record	Big 12 record
March 4	at No. 14 Arizona	No. 1	Sancet Stadium	W 5–4	16–0	–
March 5	at No. 14 Arizona	No. 1	Sancet Stadium	L 3–8	16–1	–
March 6	at No. 14 Arizona	No. 1	Sancet Stadium	W 5–4	17–1	–
March 9	No. 7 Rice	No. 1	Disch–Falk Field	W 7–0	18–1	–
March 11	Purdue	No. 1	Disch–Falk Field	W 9–1	19–1	–
March 12	Purdue	No. 1	Disch–Falk Field	W 8–6	20–1	–
March 13	Purdue	No. 1	Disch–Falk Field	W 8–0	21–1	–
March 18	No. 26 Baylor	No. 1	Disch–Falk Field	L 2–3	21–2	0–1
March 19	at No. 26 Baylor	No. 1	Baylor Ballpark	L 1–9	21–3	0–2
March 20	at No. 26 Baylor	No. 1	Baylor Ballpark	L 3–4	21–4	0–3
March 24	Texas Tech	No. 7	Disch–Falk Field	W 7–3	22–4	1–3
March 25	Texas Tech	No. 7	Disch–Falk Field	W 8–7	23–4	2–3
March 29	Texas A&M–Corpus Christi	No. 5	Disch–Falk Field	W 2–1	24–4	–

April (12–5)

Date	Opponent	Rank	Site/stadium	Score	Overall record	Big 12 record
April 1	Kansas State	No. 5	Disch–Falk Field	W 8–0	25–4	3–3
April 2	Kansas State	No. 5	Disch–Falk Field	W 5–4	26–4	4–3
April 3	Kansas State	No. 5	Disch–Falk Field	L 3–5	26–5	4–4
April 5	Texas State	No. 5	Disch–Falk Field	W 3–2	27–5	–
April 8	at No. 4 Nebraska	No. 5	Haymarket Park	L 3–4	27–6	4–5
April 9	at No. 4 Nebraska	No. 5	Haymarket Park	W 11–4	28–6	5–5
April 10	at No. 4 Nebraska	No. 5	Haymarket Park	W 6–5	29–6	6–5
April 15	Oklahoma	No. 3	Disch–Falk Field	W 2–0	30–6	7–5
April 16	Oklahoma	No. 3	Disch–Falk Field	W 4–0	31–6	8–5
April 17	Oklahoma	No. 3	Disch–Falk Field	W 11–7	32–6	9–5
April 20	at Rice	No. 3	Reckling Park	W 7–6	33–6	–
April 22	at No. 27 Oklahoma State	No. 3	Allie P. Reynolds Stadium	W 4–3	34–6	10–5
April 23	at No. 27 Oklahoma State	No. 3	Allie P. Reynolds Stadium	W 12–8	35–6	11–5
April 24	at No. 27 Oklahoma State	No. 3	Allie P. Reynolds Stadium	L 2–3	35–7	11–6
April 27	Texas State	No. 2	Disch–Falk Field	L 1–2	35–8	–
April 29	No. 16 Missouri	No. 2	Disch–Falk Field	W 4–1	36–8	12–6
April 30	No. 16 Missouri	No. 2	Disch–Falk Field	L 2–7	36–9	12–7

May (7–3)

Date	Opponent	Rank	Site/stadium	Score	Overall record	Big 12 record
May 1	No. 16 Missouri	No. 2	Disch–Falk Field	W 6–1	37–9	13–7
May 3	Texas-Pan American	No. 3	Disch–Falk Field	W 12–0	38–9	–
May 6	at Kansas	No. 3	Hoglund Ballpark	L 2–5	38–10	13–8
May 7	at Kansas	No. 3	Hoglund Ballpark	L 1–2	38–11	13–9
April 6	at Kansas	No. 3	Hoglund Ballpark	W 16–5	39–11	14–9
May 14	Dallas Baptist	No. 4	Disch–Falk Field	W 9–2	40–11	–
May 14	Dallas Baptist	No. 4	Disch–Falk Field	W 3–2	41–11	–
May 20	at Texas A&M	No. 4	Olsen Field	L 7–8	41–12	14–10
May 21	Texas A&M	No. 4	Disch–Falk Field	W 2–1	42–12	15–10
May 22	Texas A&M	No. 4	Disch–Falk Field	W 11–1	43–12	16–10

Postseason (13–4)
Big 12 Tournament (2–2)

Date	Opponent	Seed/Rank	Site/stadium	Score	Overall record	B12T record
May 25	vs. (6) Oklahoma State	(3) No. 5	Chickasaw Bricktown Ballpark	L 4–10	43–13	0–1
May 26	vs. (7) Kansas	(3) No. 5	Chickasaw Bricktown Ballpark	W 9–0	44–13	1–1
May 27	vs. (6) Oklahoma State	(3) No. 5	Chickasaw Bricktown Ballpark	W 6–1	45–13	2–1
May 28	vs. (2) No. 10 Baylor	(3) No. 5	Chickasaw Bricktown Ballpark	L 8–9	45–14	2–2

NCAA tournament: Austin Regional (4–1)

Date	Opponent	Seed/Rank	Site/stadium	Score	Overall record	NCAAT record
June 3	vs. (4) Quinnipiac	(1) No. 7	Disch–Falk Field	W 20–2	46–14	1–0
June 4	vs. (2) Arkansas	(1) No. 7	Disch–Falk Field	L 2–9	46–15	1–1
June 4	vs. (3) Miami (OH)	(1) No. 7	Disch–Falk Field	W 12–5	47–15	2–1
June 5	vs. (2) Arkansas	(1) No. 7	Disch–Falk Field	W 19–8	48–15	3–1
June 6	vs. (2) Arkansas	(1) No. 7	Disch–Falk Field	W 5–2	49–15	4–1

NCAA tournament: Oxford Super Regional (3–1)

Date	Opponent	Seed/Rank	Site/stadium	Score	Overall record	NCAAT record
June 12	vs. (5) No. 9 Ole Miss	No. 7	Swayze Field	L 4–6	49–16	4–2
June 12	vs. (5) No. 9 Ole Miss	No. 7	Swayze Field	W 3–1	50–16	5–2
June 13	vs. (5) No. 9 Ole Miss	No. 7	Swayze Field	W 6–4	51–16	6–2

NCAA tournament: College World Series (5–0)

Date	Opponent	Seed/Rank	Site/stadium	Score	Overall record	CWS record
June 18	vs. (4) No. 4 Baylor	No. 5	Rosenblatt Stadium	W 5–1	52–16	1–0
June 20	vs. (1) No. 1 Tulane	No. 5	Rosenblatt Stadium	W 5–0	53–16	2–0
June 22	vs. (4) No. 4 Baylor	No. 5	Rosenblatt Stadium	W 4–3	54–16	3–0
June 25	vs. (7) No. 6 Florida	No. 5	Rosenblatt Stadium	W 4–2	55–16	4–0
June 26	vs. (7) No. 6 Florida	No. 5	Rosenblatt Stadium	W 6–2	56–16	5–0

== Awards and honors ==
Adrian Alaniz

- Freshman All-America
- All-Big 12 Honorable Mention

Randy Boone

- All-Big 12 Honorable Mention

J. B. Cox

- All-America First Team
- College World Series All-Tournament Team
- All-Big 12 First Team

Will Crouch

- College World Series All-Tournament Team

Seth Johnston

- All-America First Team
- College World Series All-Tournament Team
- All-Big 12 First Team

Carson Kainer

- All-Big 12 Honorable Mention

Kenn Kasparek

- Freshman All-America

David Maroul

- College World Series Most Outstanding Player
- All-Big 12 Honorable Mention

Kyle McCulloch

- College World Series All-Tournament Team
- All-Big 12 First Team

Nick Peoples

- All-Big 12 Honorable Mention

Clayton Stewart

- All-Big 12 Honorable Mention

Drew Stubbs

- All-America Third Team
- All-Big 12 First Team

Taylor Teagarden

- College World Series All-Tournament Team
- All-Big 12 First Team

Clay Van Hook

- All-Big 12 Second Team

Chance Wheeless

- All-Big 12 Honorable Mention

== Longhorns in the 2005 MLB draft ==
The following members of the Texas Longhorns baseball program were drafted in the 2005 Major League Baseball draft.

Player	Position	Round	Overall	MLB team
J. B. Cox	RHP	2nd	63rd	New York Yankees
Taylor Teagarden	C	3rd	99th	Texas Rangers
Seth Johnston	2B	5th	158th	San Diego Padres
Buck Cody	LHP	16th	492nd	San Francisco Giants
David Maroul	3B	23rd	702nd	San Francisco Giants
Clayton Stewart	RHP	28th	847th	Philadelphia Phillies

== Rankings ==
Ranking movements Legend: ██ Increase in ranking ██ Decrease in ranking
	Week																				
Poll	Pre	1	2	3	4	5	6	7	8	9	10	11	12	13	14	15	16	17	18	19	Final
Coaches'	1	1*	1	1	1	1	1	4	1	1	1	1	1	2	4	3	3	5	5*	5*	1
Baseball America																					1
Collegiate Baseball^	1	1	1	1	1	1	1	7	5	5	3	3	2	3	4	4	5	7	7	5	1
NCBWA†	1	1	1	1	1	1	1	6	4	1	1	1	1	2	4	3	3	5	5	4	1

^ Collegiate Baseball ranked 40 teams in their preseason poll, but only ranked 30 teams weekly during the season.
† NCBWA ranks 30 teams in their preseason poll, but only ranks 25 teams weekly during the season.
* A new poll was not released for this week, so for comparison purposes, the previous week's ranking is inserted in this week's slot.
