= 2005 Nebraska Cornhuskers baseball team =

American college baseball season

2005 Nebraska Cornhuskers baseball

Crowne Plaza/Rice Invitational champion Big 12 regular season champion Big 12 Tournament champion

College World Series, 5th place
- Conference: Big 12 Conference

Ranking
- Coaches: No. 6
- Record: 57–15 (19–8 Big 12)
- Head coach: Mike Anderson
- Hitting coach: Andy Sawyers
- Pitching coach: Rob Childress
- Home stadium: Hawks Field

2005 Big 12 Conference baseball standings
	Conf.						Overall
Team	W		L		T	PCT	W		L		T	PCT
No. 6 Nebraska ‍†‍‡‍^{y}	19	–	8	–	0	.704	57	–	15	–	0	.792
No. 4 Baylor ‍†‍‍^{y}	19	–	8	–	0	.704	46	–	24	–	0	.657
No. 1 Texas ‍‍‍^{y}	16	–	10	–	0	.615	56	–	16	–	0	.778
Missouri ‍‍‍^{y}	16	–	11	–	0	.593	40	–	23	–	0	.635
Oklahoma ‍‍‍^{y}	14	–	13	–	0	.519	35	–	26	–	0	.574
Oklahoma State ‍‍‍	12	–	15	–	0	.444	34	–	25	–	0	.576
Kansas ‍‍‍	11	–	15	–	0	.423	36	–	28	–	0	.563
Texas Tech ‍‍‍	9	–	16	–	0	.360	34	–	25	–	0	.576
Texas A&M ‍‍‍	9	–	18	–	0	.333	30	–	25	–	1	.545
Kansas State ‍‍‍	8	–	19	–	0	.296	30	–	25	–	0	.545
† – Conference champion ‡ – Tournament champion y – Invited to the NCAA tournament Rankings from Collegiate Baseball

The 2005 Nebraska Cornhuskers baseball team was Mike Anderson's third year as head coach. The Huskers played their home games at Hawks Field.

== 2004 ==
Nebraska posted a 36–23 record, with 14 of the losses being by two runs or less as they barely missed their first NCAA regional appearance since 1998. However, the Huskers were the only Big 12 team not shut out during the whole season, and they established a school record and ranked eighth nationally with a .975 fielding percentage shattering the previous best of .971. A few honors include Big 12 player of the years and first-team All-American third baseman Alex Gordon and All-Big 12 selections Zach Kroenke, Curtis Ledbetter and Joe Simokaitis.

== Preseason ==
- The Huskers returned six everyday position players along with three of their top four weekend starters
- Will Bolt was promoted to volunteer assistant coach overseeing the infielders and assist with the hitters. He was on the staff serving as a graduate manager for the 2004 season.
- Collegiate Baseball rated Nebraska's class of 23 newcomers, which includes 16 freshmen, six junior college transfers and Nebraska-Kearney transfer Joba Chamberlain, 16th nationally ranking which is the highest ever for a class of Husker newcomers.
- Four high school seniors and four junior college transfers have signed National Letters-of-Intent to play baseball at Nebraska beginning in the 2005–06 season.
- Alex Gordon was selected to the Brooks Wallace Award Watch List, Preseason NCBWA All-America First-Team, and was the Collegiate Baseball Preseason Player of the Year.

== Roster ==
Number	Name	Height/Weight	Position	Class
2	Joe Simokaitis	6–1 / 195	Shortstop	Senior
3	Jake Opitz	5–11 / 190	Second base	Freshman
4	Alex Gordon	6–1 / 215	Third base	Junior
5	Adam Moore	6–3 / 220	Catcher	(redshirt) Junior
8	Jesse Boyer	6–1 / 195	Outfield	Senior
9	Trey Adams	6–1 / 190	Outfield	Junior
10	Ryan Wehrle	6–3 / 195	Second base / Shortstop	Freshman
11	Tyler Vaughn	6–2 / 205	Infield	(redshirt) Sophomore
12	Daniel Bruce	6–0 / 185	Outfield	Senior
13	Ryan Hines	6–5 / 225	Pitcher	Freshman
14	Brandon Fusilier	6–3 / 220	Outfield	Senior
15	Curtis Ledbetter	6–3 / 215	First base	Senior
16	Jeff Christy	6–1 / 210	Catcher	Junior
17	Casey Klapperich	5–11 / 185	Infield	(redshirt) Freshman
18	Brian Duensing	6–0 / 195	Pitcher	Junior
19	Brandon Buckman	6–6 / 220	DH / First base	Junior
20	Luke Wertz	6–1 / 175	Pitcher	Freshman
21	Nick Sullivan	5–11 / 200	Outfield	(redshirt) Freshman
22	Jon Klausing	6–6 / 200	Pitcher	Sophomore
23	Johnny Dorn	6–3 / 205	Pitcher	Freshman
24	Bryce Nimmo	5–11 / 170	Outfield	Freshman
25	Ryan Bohanan	6–1 / 200	Pitcher	Freshman
26	Andy Gerch	6–1 / 205	Outfield	Freshman
28	Matt Wagner	6–4 / 225	Infield	(redshirt) Freshman
30	Tony Watson	6–4 / 195	Pitcher	Freshman
31	Tim Radmacher	6–0 / 170	Pitcher	(redshirt) Freshman
32	Al Smith	6–2 / 225	First base	Sophomore
33	Brett Jensen	6–7 / 190	Pitcher	Junior
34	Zach Kroenke	6–2 / 205	Pitcher	Junior
35	Phil Shirek	6–3 / 210	Pitcher	Senior
36	Matt Foust	6–3 / 220	Pitcher	Freshman
38	Dustin Timm	6–4 / 185	Pitcher	Senior
39	Mike Harmelink	6–0 / 200	Pitcher	Sophomore
40	Charlie Shirek	6–3 / 190	Pitcher	(redshirt) Freshman
42	Jeremy Becker	5–11 / 220	Pitcher	Senior
43	Deric Manrique	5–10 / 175	Outfield	(redshirt) Freshman
44	Joba Chamberlain	6–3 / 225	Pitcher	Sophomore
45	Mark Hightower	5–11 / 195	Catcher	Freshman
47	Drew Schwab	6–4 / 185	Pitcher	(redshirt) Freshman
50	Jake Mort	5–10 / 170	Infield	(redshirt) Freshman

== Schedule ==
2005 Nebraska Cornhuskers baseball Game Log

Regular Season
Date	Location	NU Rank	Opponent	Winning Pitcher	Losing Pitcher	Save by	Result	Record (Big 12)
Feb. 17	Hilo, Hawaii	NR	Hawaii-Hilo	Timm (1–0)	Biggs (0–4)		W 12–4	1–0
Feb. 18	Hilo, Hawaii	NR	Hawaii-Hilo	Jensen (1–0)	Matson (0–4)		W 2–1	2–0
Feb. 18	Hilo, Hawaii	NR	Hawaii-Hilo	Duensing (1–0)	Olszewski	Bohanan (1)	W 5–1	3–0
Feb. 19	Hilo, Hawaii	NR	Hawaii-Hilo	Watson (1–0)	Pinasco (0–2)	Jensen (1)	W 6–3	4–0
Feb. 20	Hilo, Hawaii	NR	Hawaii-Hilo	P. Shirek (1–0)	Neuberger (0–1)		W 8–1	5–0
Feb. 25	Houston, Texas,	27	New Mexico	Chamberlain (1–0)	Fernandez (2–2)		W 12–0	6–0
Feb. 27	Houston, Texas	27	#7 Rice	Duensing (2–0)	Cox (0–1)	Jensen (2)	W 6–3	7–0
March 4	Round Rock, Texas,	18	#7 Rice	Chamberlain (2–0)	Savery (2–1)	Timm (1)	W 4–3	8–0
March 5	Round Rock, Texas	18	Texas State	Moore (3–0)	Dorn (0–1)		L 1 - 2	8–1
March 6	Round Rock, Texas	18	USC	Koss (1–0)	Watson (1–1)	Smith (1)	L 4–5	8–2
March 11	Hawks Field	22	South Dakota State	Chamberlain (3–0)	Bothof (1–1)		W 7–2	9–2
March 12	Hawks Field	22	South Dakota State	Kroenke (1–0)	Torres (0–3)		W 15–1	10–2
March 12	Hawks Field	22	South Dakota State	Dorn (1–1)	Decker (0–1)		W 15–3	11–2
March 13	Hawks Field	22	South Dakota State	P. Shirek (2–0)	Elliott (0–3)		W 17–4	12–2
March 15	Hawks Field	21	Northern Colorado	Duensing (3–0)	Leines (1–1)		W 15–4	13–2
March 16	Hawks Field	21	Northern Colorado	Watson (2–1)	Ayers (0–5)	Jensen (3)	W 5–2	14–2
March 17	Hawks Field	21	Northern Colorado	Dorn (2–1)	Sands (0–1)		W 10–2	15–2
March 18	Hawks Field	21	Seton Hall	Chamberlain (4–0)	Haggerty (2–2)	Jensen (4)	W 6–2	16–2
March 19	Hawks Field	21	Seton Hall	Kroenke (2–0)	Sabo (0–3)		W 11–2	17–2
March 20	Hawks Field	21	Seton Hall	P. Shirek (3–0)	Irwin (0–1)		W 10–3	18–2
March 22	Hawks Field	Canceled						
March 23	Hawks Field	9	Western Illinois	Watson (3–1)	Navin (0–5)	Jensen (5)	W 6–3	19–2
March 26	Lawrence, Kansas	9	Kansas	Czyz (2–1)	Jensen (1–1)		L 6–7	19–3 (0–1)
March 26	Lawrence, Kansas	9	Kansas	Kroenke (3–0)	Land (2–2)	Dorn (1)	W 9–3	20–3 (1–1)
March 27	Lawrence, Kansas	9	Kansas	Duensing (4–0)	Quick (7–2)		W 9–4	21–3 (2–1)
March 29	Hawks Field	7	Creighton	Dorn (3–1)	Bilek (2–1)		W 10–2	22–3 (2–1)
April 1	Hawks Field	7	#29 Oklahoma State	Timm(2–0)	Cowley (6–2)		W 8–4	23–3 (3–1)
April 2	Hawks Field	7	#29 Oklahoma State	Kroenke (4–0)	Rivas (1–2)		W 6–0	24–3 (4–1)
April 3	Hawks Field	7	#29 Oklahoma State	Duensing (5–0)	Richmond (2–2)		W 10–0	25–3 (5–1)
April 5	Rosenblatt Stadium	4	Creighton	Reese (8–0)	Timm (2–1)		L 3–4	25–4 (5–1)
April 6	Hawks Field	4	Iowa	Dorn (4–1)	Sweet (0–2)		W 6–1	26–4 (5–1)
April 8	Hawks Field	4	#1 Texas	Timm (3–1)	Cody (3–1)		W 4–3	27–4 (6–1)
April 9	Hawks Field	4	#1 Texas	Alaniz (2–0)	Kroenke (4–1)	Cody (1)	L 4–11	27–5 (6–2)
April 10	Hawks Field	4	#1 Texas	Stewart (7–0)	P. Shirek (3–1)	J.B. Cox (8)	L 5–6	27–6 (6–3)
April 12	Hawks Field	Postponed						
April 13	Hawks Field	10	North Dakota State	Watson (4–1)	Tchida (0–4)		W 12–1	28–6 (6–3)
April 13	Hawks Field	10	North Dakota State	Bohanan (1–0)	Branca (0–1)	Foust (1)	W 10–0	29–6 (6–3)
April 15	College Station, Texas,	10	Texas A&M	Chamberlain (5–0)	Meyer (5–2)		W 2–1	30–6 (7–3)
April 16	College Station, Texas	10	Texas A&M	Turner (2–2)	Jensen (1–2)		L 4–5	30–7 (7–4)
April 17	College Station, Texas	10	Texas A&M	Dorn (5–1)	Corgan (3–2)		W 6–4	31–7 (8–4)
April 20	Des Moines, Iowa	7	Northern Iowa	Becker (1–0)	Rinnan (0–1)	Jensen (6)	W 7–4	32-7 (8–4)
April 22	Hawks Field	7	#8 Baylor	Chamberlain (6–0)	Taylor (4–4)		W 8–4	33–7 (9–4)
April 23	Hawks Field	7	#8 Baylor	McCormick (6–2)	Kroenke (4–2)	LaMotta (4)	L 1–4	33–8 (9–5)
April 24	Hawks Field	7	#8 Baylor	Dorn (6–1)	VanAllen (6–3)		W 4–3	34–8 (10–5)
April 27	Wichita, Kansas	5	Wichita State	P. Shirek (4–1)	Touchatt (3–1)	Jensen (7)	W 4–2	35-8 (10–5)
April 28	Norman, Oklahoma	5	Oklahoma	McCutchen (2–3)	Chamberlain (6–1)		L 1–5	35–9 (10–6)
April 29	Norman, Oklahoma	5	Oklahoma	Kroenke (5–2)	Guerra (4–5)		W 8–1	36–9 (11–6)
April 30	Norman, Oklahoma	5	Oklahoma	Dorn (7–1)	Patterson		W 7–1	37–9 (12–6)
May 6	Hawks Field	5	#17 Missouri	Scherzer (7–2)	Chamberlain (6–2)		L 1–2	37–10 (12–7)
May 7	Hawks Field	5	#17 Missouri	Timm (4–1)	Admire (2–1)	Jensen (8)	W 7–5	38–10 (13–7)
May 8	Hawks Field	5	#17 Missouri	Jensen (2–2)	Johnston (2–3)		W 6–5	39–10 (14–7)
May 10	Rosenblatt Stadium	3	Creighton	Reese (10–0)	Bohanan (1–1)	Bird (5)	L 3–5	39–11 (14–7)
May 13	Lubbock, Texas,	3	Texas Tech	Duensing (6–0)	Carnline (6–3)		W 9–4	40–11 (15–7)
May 14	Lubbock, Texas	3	Texas Tech	Dorn (8–1)	Richardson (1–1)		W 6–1	41–11 (16–7)
May 15	Lubbock, Texas	3	Texas Tech	Carnline (7–3)	Jensen (2–3)		L 6–7	41–12 (16–8)
May 17	Hawks Field	5	Northern Illinois	Watson (5–1)	J. Hall (0–1)		W 10–2	42–12 (16–8)
May 18	Hawks Field	5	Northern Illinois	Wertz (1–0)	N. Hall (3–7)	Jensen (9)	W 3–2	43–12 (16–8)
May 20	Hawks Field	5	Kansas State	Chamberlain (7–2)	Mitchell (7–6)	Jensen (10)	W 5–4	44–12 (17–8)
May 21	Hawks Field	5	Kansas State	Dorn (9–1)	Hutt (2–1)	Jensen (11)	W 10–6	45–12 (18–8)
May 22	Hawks Field	5	Kansas State	Kroenke (6–2)	Cowart (5–3)		W 3–1	46–12 (19–8)

Postseason
Big 12 Tournament
Date	Location	NU Rank	Opponent	Winning Pitcher	Losing Pitcher	Save by	Result	Record (Big 12)
May 25	Oklahoma City, Oklahoma	4	Texas Tech	Lawford (4–6)	Jensen (2–4)		L 3–5	46–13 (19–8)
May 26	Oklahoma City, Oklahoma	4	Oklahoma	Chamberlain (8–2)	Patterson (6–3)	Kroenke (1)	W 6–3	47–13 (19–8)
May 27	Oklahoma City, Oklahoma	4	Texas Tech	Dorn (10–1)	Ta., McElroy (2–4)		W 2–1	48–13 (19–8)
May 28	Oklahoma City, Oklahoma	4	Missouri	Jensen (3–4)	Johnston (4–4)		W 5–4	49–13 (19–8)
May 28	Oklahoma City, Oklahoma	4	Missouri	Watson (6–1)	Admire (2–3)	P. Shirek (1)	W 17–9	50–13 (19–8)
May 29	Oklahoma City, Oklahoma	4	Baylor	Duensing (7–0)	McCormick (7–3)	Jensen(12)	W 1–0	51–13 (19–8)
Lincoln Regional
Date	Location	NU Rank	Opponent	Winning Pitcher	Losing Pitcher	Save by	Result	Record (Big 12)
June 3	Hawks Field	3	Illinois-Chicago	Duensing (8–0)	Zink (8–6)	Jensen (13)	W 8–6	52–13 (19–8)
June 4	Hawks Field	3	Creighton	Dorn (11–1)	Schaecher (6–4)	Watson (1)	W 10–8	53–13 (19–8)
June 5	Hawks Field	3	Creighton	Kroenke (7–2)	Mancuso (1–1)		W 10–2	54–13 (19–8)
Lincoln Super Regional
Date	Location	NU Rank	Opponent	Winning Pitcher	Losing Pitcher	Save by	Result	Record (Big 12)
June 10	Hawks Field	3	Miami	Chamberlain (9–2)	Carrillo (13–3)	Jensen (14)	W 3–1	55–13 (19–8)
June 11	Hawks Field	3	Miami	Dorn (12–1)	Camardese (6–1)	Jensen (15)	W 6–3	56–13 (19–8)
College World Series
Date	Location	NU Rank	Opponent	Winning Pitcher	Losing Pitcher	Save by	Result	Record (Big 12)
June 17	Rosenblatt Stadium	2	Arizona State	Chamberlain (10–2)	Zinicola (3–4)	Jensen (16)	W 5–3	57–13 (19–8)
June 19	Rosenblatt Stadium	2	Florida	O'Day (8–3)	Dorn (12–2)		L 4–7	57–14 (19–8)
June 21	Rosenblatt Stadium	2	Arizona State	Zinicola (4–4)	Jensen (3–5)		L 7–8	57–15 (19–8)

== Season review ==
During the final weekend of the season, the Huskers were two games behind Baylor in the conference race. Nebraska won its first two games against Kansas State, while Baylor and Missouri split their first two contests, putting the Huskers in position to earn a share of the league crown. Behind Kroenke's complete-game gem on Senior Day, Nebraska posted a 3–1 victory, while Missouri capped NU's title hopes by beating Baylor in Waco later that day, giving the two teams a share of the Big 12 crown. The two teams would meet one week later with the Big 12 Tournament title on the line. The game was scoreless until the sixth when Andy Gerch's sacrifice fly plated Gordon for the game's only run. Duensing and Jensen combined on a three-hit shutout to give NU a 1–0 win over the Bears and the Huskers’ fourth Big 12 Tourney crown since 1999 and winning the regular-season and tournament titles in the same season for the second time in school history (2001).

During the College World Series in Omaha, trailing 5–3 in the ninth inning, the Huskers were down to their last at-bat, looking to extend the season. As they had done 20 times during the season, Nebraska began to rally, opening the inning with two hits before Alex Gordon's RBI single pulled NU within 5–4. Two batters later, freshman Andy Gerch sent an 0–2 pitch into the left-field bleachers, giving the Huskers a 7–5 lead. The lead was short-lived, as Arizona State scored twice in the bottom of the ninth – including a game-tying homer by Jeff Larish – before ending two innings later for an 8–7 ASU win.

For head coach Mike Anderson, the heart shown by the Huskers was a characteristic that he saw develop throughout the year. "This was a resilient group all year long," Anderson said. "We fought and fought, and it didn’t surprise me at all that we scored those runs in the ninth." While its resiliency allowed the Huskers to never be out of a contest, Anderson credited the team's selflessness as the catalyst for going from eighth to first in the Big 12 and returning to the College World Series for the first time since 2002.

For Nebraska's eight seniors, 2005 capped a remarkable five-year run in which NU won 237 games, claimed three Big 12 titles and made three College World Series appearances.

A total of six Huskers were selected in the Major League Baseball First-Year Player Draft, including four players in the top 10 rounds. Alex Gordon became Nebraska's fifth first-round pick, as he was chosen by Kansas City with the No. 2 overall pick. Brian Duensing and Zach Kroenke joined Gordon as players taken in the first five rounds, as they were picked in the third and fifth rounds, respectively. The trio's selections marked the first time that three Huskers were taken in the first five rounds of the draft.

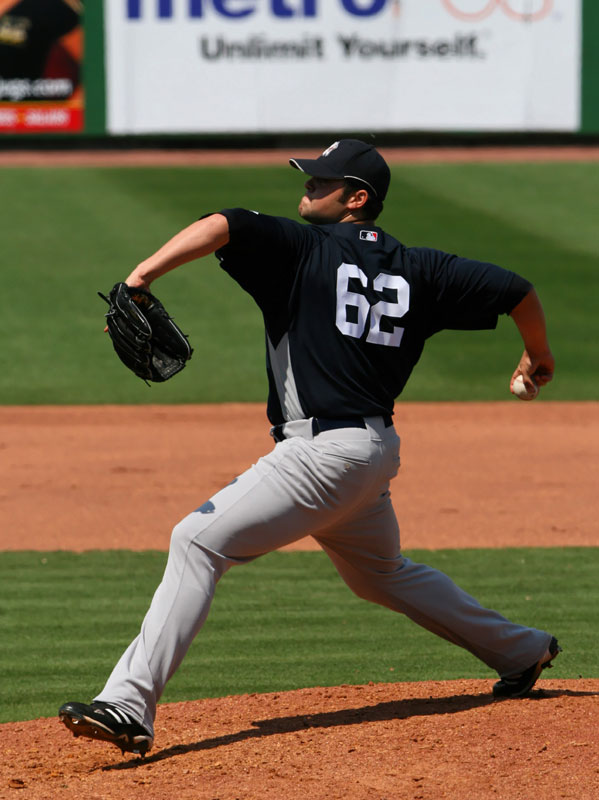
Joba Chamberlain in 2008 spring training for the New York Yankees

Pitching

Nebraska relied on the combination of a dominant pitching staff, strong defense and clutch hitting to put together a 57–15 record and sweep the Big 12 regular season and tournament titles en route to a berth in the College World Series. The 57 wins topped the previous school mark of 51 set in 2000. The Huskers finished the year ranked as high as fifth in the national polls after opening the year at No. 50 in Baseball America's preseason issue. Also, their No. 2 ranking in Baseball America heading into the College World Series is its highest in any national poll since the 2001 season (a year the Huskers were ranked first for two weeks by Baseball America).

On the mound, Nebraska put together one of the most dominant staffs in Big 12 history. The Huskers ranked second nationally with a Big 12-low 2.69 ERA, the best by a Husker staff since 1969, holding 54 of its 72 opponents to four runs or less tying for the second lowest single-season ERA in school history. It also finished .03 off the Big 12 mark of 2.66 set by Texas in 2004. NU set single-season records for wins (57), saves (23) and strikeouts (538), while holding opponents to a .227 average. The heart of the staff was a four-man rotation of right-handers Joba Chamberlain and Johnny Dorn and southpaws Brian Duensing and Zach Kroenke. They won 15 straight decisions until Johnny Dorn's loss to Florida on June 19 at the College World Series. The quartet combined for a 37–6 record, as all earned All-Big 12 honors in 2005.

A transfer from Division II Nebraska-Kearney, Chamberlain went 10–2 with a 2.81 ERA en route to third-team All-America honors. The Big 12 Newcomer of the Year and a first-team all league pick, Chamberlain was second in the Big 12 with 130 strikeouts and ranked in the top 10 in seven categories. The sophomore right-hander recorded five double-digit strikeout performances, including 15 against New Mexico in just his second start as a Husker. Chamberlain saved his best performance of the year until the Super Regional against Miami, which he fanned 13 and allowed one run over eight innings to out-duel Cesar Carillo in a 3–1 win.

Dorn became one of the Big 12's top freshmen, going 12–2 to capture third-team All-America honors. The Big 12 Freshman of the Year and a first-team all conference selection, Dorn went 12–2 with a 2.16 ERA, tying for the league lead in wins and ranking among the top five in the Big 12 in wins, ERA and opponent batting average. Dorn was superb in conference play, going 5–0 with a 2.08 ERA, as he earned the clinching win in five of NU's eight series victories.

Duensing returned from missing nearly two full seasons with an elbow injury to post an 8–0 record and earn All-Big 12 honors. Duensing split time between the rotation and the bullpen, he tossed 7.2 innings of shutout ball at the Big 12 title game, as NU blanked Baylor, 1–0, to win the conference tournament title.

Kroenke went 7–2 with a 2.82 ERA to pick up second-team all-conference accolades. The Omaha native saved his best efforts for NU's biggest moments, tossing a complete game against Kansas State to help clinch the Big 12 title. Two weeks later, Kroenke struck out a career-high 13 in a complete-game masterpiece against Creighton in the regional title game.

While NU's rotation was the envy of much of college baseball, the Huskers also relied on a talented bullpen led by closer Brett Jensen. The junior ranked third in the country with 16 saves to earn All-Big 12 honors, while set-up man Dustin Timm also earned All-Big 12 honors.

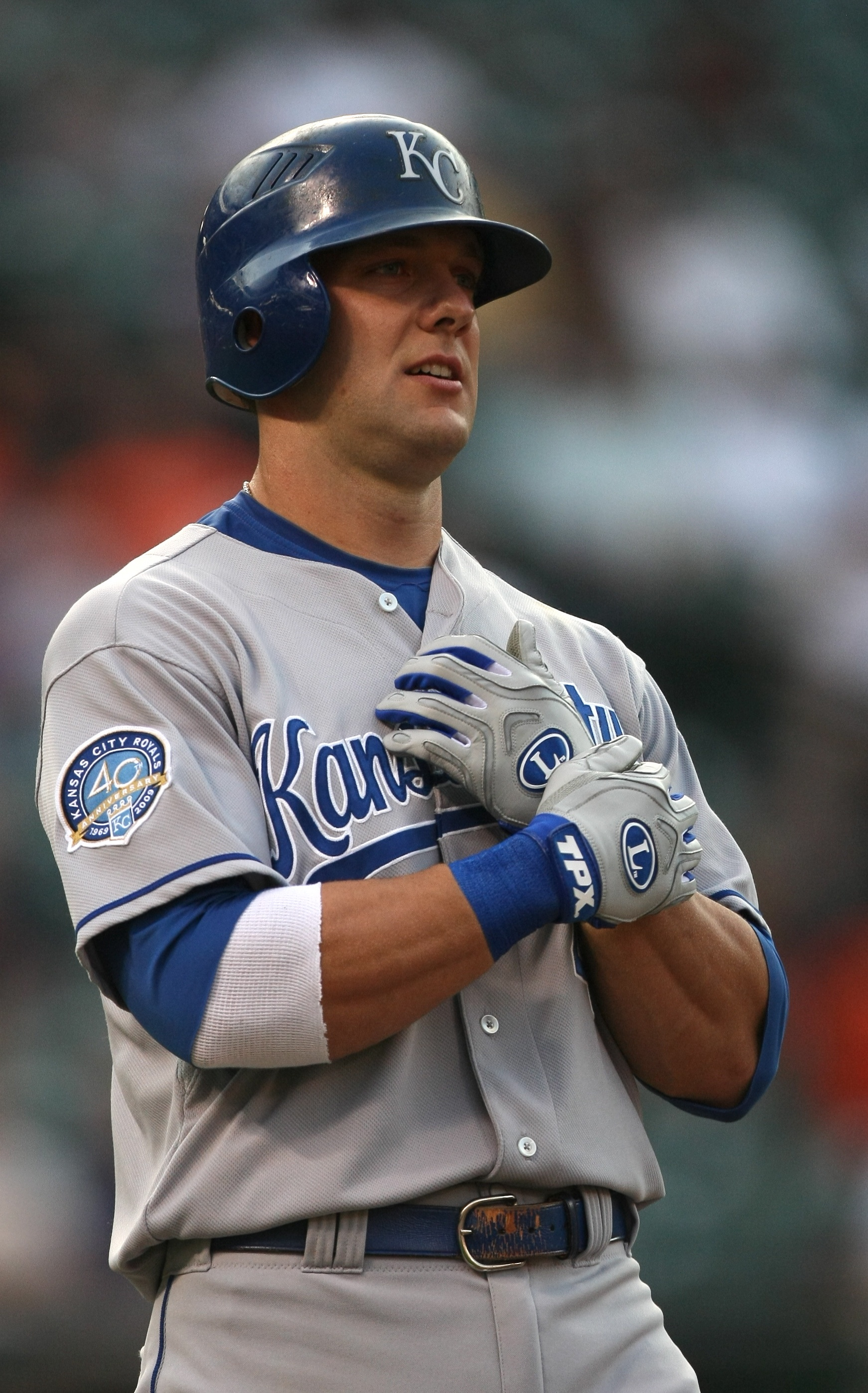
Alex Gordon was the #2 overall pick in the 2005 MLB draft

Offense

Offensively, the Huskers were led by the leadership and all-around abilities of third baseman Alex Gordon. A two-time All-American, Gordon made Husker history by becoming the first NU baseball player to be named national player of the year. the junior from Lincoln hit .372 with 19 home runs, 66 RBIs and 23 stolen bases. He led the Big 12 in six statistical categories and was named the conference player of the year for a second consecutive season.

Gordon was one of four hitters to receive All-Big 12 honors in 2005. Senior first baseman Curtis Ledbetter garnered first-team All-Big 12 honors, hitting .319 with 13 homers and 55 RBIs. He ranked fourth in the Big 12 in homers and was named MVP of the Big 12 Tournament, leading NU back to its fourth conference tournament title since 1999.

While Gordon and Ledbetter provided most of the offensive firepower, seniors Joe Simokaitis and Daniel Bruce provided leadership on the field to instrumental roles in 2005.

the junior from Lincoln hit .372 with 19 home runs, 66 RBIs and 23 stolen bases. He led the Big 12 in six statistical categories and was named the conference player of the year for a second consecutive season.Simokaitis finished his career as the Big 12's all-time leader in assists. Selected in the 10th round of the MLB Draft, Simokaitis batted .310 with three home runs, 37 RBIs and 18 stolen bases during the season.

Bruce shined in both the classroom and on the diamond in 2005. A second-team CoSIDA Academic All-American, he was named Nebraska's Male Student-Athlete of the Year and earned an NCAA postgraduate scholarship. Bruce also hit .322 with five homers and 32 RBIs to earn All-Big 12 honors.

Fans also turned out in record numbers to watch the Huskers in 2005, as NU averaged a school-record 4,984 fans per home game to rank sixth nationally. Hawks Field drew seven of its 10 largest crowds in 2005, highlighted by a school-record crowd of 8,771 for the Super Regional clinching win over Miami. NU enjoyed immense success at home, going 33–4 at its home park, including a perfect 5–0 during the NCAA tournament breaking the previous single-season home mark for wins of 29 set five times (1980, 1988, 2002, 2003 and 2008).

While Nebraska was dominant at home, the Huskers put themselves in position to reach the postseason with success on the road. NU went 15–6 in road games during the regular season, a total that ranked third nationally. In Big 12 play, the Huskers stayed in contention for the league title, going 8–4 away from Hawks Field and winning every conference road series for the first time since 1938.

Nine of Nebraska's 15 losses this season were by one run, as the Huskers finished 11–9 in one-run games. After having just one multi-homer game in 2004, Nebraska had eight this season, including four by first baseman/catcher Curtis Ledbetter and two by All-American third baseman Alex Gordon.

== Stats ==
Hitting

Player	G	BA	AB	H	2B	3B	HR	TB	SLG	R	RBI	BB	SO	SB
Adams, Trey	52	.238	101	24	3	3	1	36	.356	18	9	19	15	7
Bohanan, Ryan	28	.306	62	19	3	0	1	25	.403	11	14	7	9	0
Boyer, Jesse	49	.271	177	48	11	1	1	64	.362	34	17	20	29	4
Bruce, Daniel	69	.322	230	74	22	2	5	115	.500	47	32	15	48	9
Buckman, Brandon	49	.335	161	54	10	0	2	70	.435	26	30	19	28	4
Christy, Jeff	67	.237	190	45	5	0	1	53	.279	32	32	33	36	4
Fusilier, Brandon	57	.282	188	53	6	1	12	97	.516	37	45	17	43	14
Gerch, Andy	57	.364	151	55	7	2	4	78	.517	33	35	14	23	3
Gordon, Alex	72	.372	253	94	22	4	19	181	.715	79	66	63	38	23
Hightower, Mark	18	.400	10	4	0	0	0	4	.400	1	3	1	3	1
Ledbetter, Curtis	71	.319	288	92	18	1	13	151	.524	52	55	15	47	3
Nimmo, Bryce	46	.207	82	17	1	0	2	24	.293	19	12	12	12	4
Opitz, Jake	52	.256	129	33	6	0	3	48	.372	19	14	17	24	3
Simokaitis, Joe	69	.310	277	86	8	0	3	103	.372	53	37	34	33	18
Wehrle, Ryan	57	.275	149	41	6	1	0	49	.329	26	25	21	17	4

Pitching

Player	App	GS	W	L	SV	ERA	CG	SHO	IP	H	R	ER	BB	SO
Becker, Jeremy	10	0	1	0	0	2.57	0	0	7.0	8	2	2	0	5
Bohanan, Ryan	21	1	1	1	1	2.79	0	0	29.0	25	11	9	10	22
Chamberlain, Joba	18	18	10	2	0	2.81	1	0	118.7	91	44	37	33	130
Dorn, Johnny	20	13	12	2	1	2.16	1	0	104.0	75	33	25	21	76
Duensing, Brian	23	10	8	0	0	3.00	1	1	84.0	69	28	28	28	52
Foust, Matt	5	0	0	0	1	2.57	0	0	7.0	6	2	2	3	5
Harmelink, Mike	5	0	0	0	0	3.00	0	0	6.0	5	2	2	4	8
Jensen, Brett	33	0	3	5	16	1.96	0	0	46.0	36	17	10	9	46
Klausing, Jon	2	0	0	0	0	-	0	0	2.7	80	0	0	1	0
Kroenke, Zach	20	16	7	2	1	2.78	4	1	97.0	80	37	30	28	88
Shirek, Phil	14	7	4	1	1	3.32	0	0	40.7	42	17	15	10	26
Timm, Dustin	19	0	4	1	1	2.13	0	0	38.0	30	13	9	9	23
Watson, Tony	23	5	6	1	1	2.82	0	0	44.7	41	20	14	26	39
Wertz, Luke	10	2	1	0	0	4.43	0	0	18.3	22	9	9	5	18

== Awards ==
Mike Anderson

- Big 12 Coach of the Year
- Collegebaseballinsider National Coach of the Year Finalist

Jeremy Becker

- First-Team Academic All-Big 12

Daniel Bruce

- Second-Team All-Big 12
- ESPN the Magazine Second-Team Academic All-American
- Nebraska Male Student-Athlete of the Year
- First-Team Academic All-Big 12
- Big 12 Postgraduate Scholarship
- NCAA Postgraduate Scholarship

Joba Chamberlain

- Collegiate Baseball Third-Team All-American
- First-Team All-Big 12
- Big 12 Newcomer Pitcher of the Year
- Second-Team ABCA All-Midwest Region
- Big 12 Pitcher of the Week (3/1 & 4/25)
- Collegiate Baseball National Pitcher of the Week (3/1)

Johnny Dorn

- Baseball America First-Team Freshman All-American
- Collegiate Baseball Freshman All-American
- Collegiate Baseball, ABCA and NCBWA Third-Team All-American
- First-Team All-Big 12
- Big 12 Freshman Pitcher of the Year
- First-Team ABCA All-Midwest Region
- 2005 Team USA Invitee

Brian Duensing

- Honorable-Mention All-Big 12
- Big 12 All-Tournament Team
- First-Team Academic All-Big 12
- Collegiate Baseball National Pitcher of the Week (5/30)

Andy Gerch

- College World Series All-Tournament Team
- NCAA Lincoln Regional Most Outstanding Player
- NCAA Lincoln Regional All-Tournament Team
- Big 12 All-Tournament Team

Alex Gordon

- USA Baseball Golden Spikes Award Winner
- Xanthus Dick Howser Trophy Winner
- Brooks Wallace Award Winner
- ABCA National Player of the Year
- Baseball America National Player of the Year
- ESPY Award Finalist for Male College Athlete of the Year
- Omaha World-Herald Ware Award Winner
- Lincoln Journal Star Husker Athlete of the Year
- Baseball America, Sports Weekly, NCBWA, ABCA and Collegiate Baseball First-Team All-American
- NCBWA District VI Player of the Year
- Big 12 Player of the Year
- First-Team All-Big 12
- First-Team ABCA All-Midwest Region Team
- NCAA Lincoln Regional All-Tournament Team
- Big 12 All-Tournament Team
- Husker Power Lifter of the Year
- Two Time Big 12 Player of the Week (3/22 & 3/29)

Brett Jensen

- Second-Team All-Big 12

Zach Kroenke

- Second-Team All-Big 12
- NCAA Lincoln Regional All-Tournament Team

Curtis Ledbetter

- First-Team All-Big 12
- Big 12 Tournament MVP
- Big 12 All-Tournament Team
- NCAA Lincoln Regional All-Tournament Team
- Second-Team ABCA All-Midwest Region Team

Phil Shirek

- Second-Team Academic All-Big 12

Joe Simokaitis

- Honorable-Mention All-Big 12
- Big 12 All-Tournament Team

Dustin Timm

- Honorable-Mention All-Big 12
- First-Team Academic All-Big 12

Tony Watson

- Collegiate Baseball Freshman All-American

Ryan Wehrle

- Honorable-Mention All-Big 12

== Rankings ==
Ranking movements Legend: ██ Increase in ranking ██ Decrease in ranking — = Not ranked RV = Received votes
	Week																				
Poll	Pre	1	2	3	4	5	6	7	8	9	10	11	12	13	14	15	16	17	18	19	Final
Coaches'	—	—*	—	—	21	22	21	16	16	10	11	9	6	5	5	7	5	4	4	4	6
Baseball America	50	—	—	—	—	—	23	20	20	17	17	11	8	7	6	7	4	3	4	2	5
Collegiate Baseball^	31	30	—	27	18	23	21	9	7	4	10	7	5	5	3	5	4	4	4	3	6
NCBWA†	—	RV	RV	32	19	25	20	19	8	8	10	8	6	4	3	6	5	4	4	3	6

^ Collegiate Baseball ranked 40 teams in their preseason poll, but only ranked 30 teams weekly during the season.
† NCBWA ranks 30 teams in their preseason poll, but only ranks 25 teams weekly during the season.
* A new poll was not released for this week, so for comparison purposes, the previous week's ranking is inserted in this week's slot.

== Huskers in the MLB draft ==
2005

Player	Position	Round	Overall	MLB Org.
Alex Gordon	3B	1	2	Kansas City Royals
Brian Duensing	LHP	3	84	Minnesota Twins
Zach Kroenke	LHP	5	169	New York Yankees
Joe Simokaitis	SS	10	310	Chicago Cubs
Curtis Ledbetter	1B	18	533	Seattle Mariners
Brett Jensen*	RHP	23	684	Washington Nationals

2006

Player	Position	Round	Overall	MLB Org.
Joba Chamberlain	RHP	1	41	New York Yankees
Jeff Christy	C	6	186	Minnesota Twins
Brett Jensen	RHP	14	412	Detroit Tigers
Tony Watson*	LHP	17	505	Baltimore Orioles
Ryan Wehrle	SS	18	534	Cincinnati Reds
Brandon Buckman	1B	19	586	St. Louis Cardinals

2007

Player	Position	Round	Overall	MLB Org.
Matt Foust	RHP	6	188	Pittsburgh Pirates
Tony Watson	LHP	9	278	Pittsburgh Pirates
Luke Wertz	RHP	13	413	Philadelphia Phillies
Charlie Shirek	RHP	23	719	Chicago White Sox

2008

Player	Position	Round	Overall	MLB Org.
Jake Opitz	2B	12	371	Chicago Cubs
Johnny Dorn	RHP	15	448	Florida Marlins

- Did not sign

== See also ==
- 2005 Big 12 baseball tournament
- 2005 NCAA Division I baseball tournament
- 2005 College World Series
