= Mike Anderson (baseball coach) =

American baseball coach and former outfielder

Current position
- Title: Head coach
- Team: Northern Colorado
- Conference: Summit League
- Record: 45–105–1

Biographical details
- Born: June 8, 1965 (age 61); Brighton, Colorado, U.S.

Playing career
- 1983–1986: Northern Colorado
- 1986–1989: California Angels organization
- Position: Outfielder

Coaching career (HC unless noted)
- 1989–1994: American Legion
- 1991–1994: Northern Colorado Lab School
- 1992–1993: Northern Colorado (Asst.)
- 1994: Nebraska (Asst.)
- 1995–2002: Nebraska (Asst.)
- 2003–2011: Nebraska
- 2012–2013: Regis Jesuit High School
- 2014–2017: Oklahoma (Asst.)
- 2023–present: Northern Colorado

Head coaching record
- Overall: 382–301–3
- Tournaments: NCAA: 12–10

Accomplishments and honors

Championships
- Big 12 Conference (2003, 2005); Big 12 Conference tournament (2005)

Awards
- Big 12 Coach of the Year (2003, 2005)

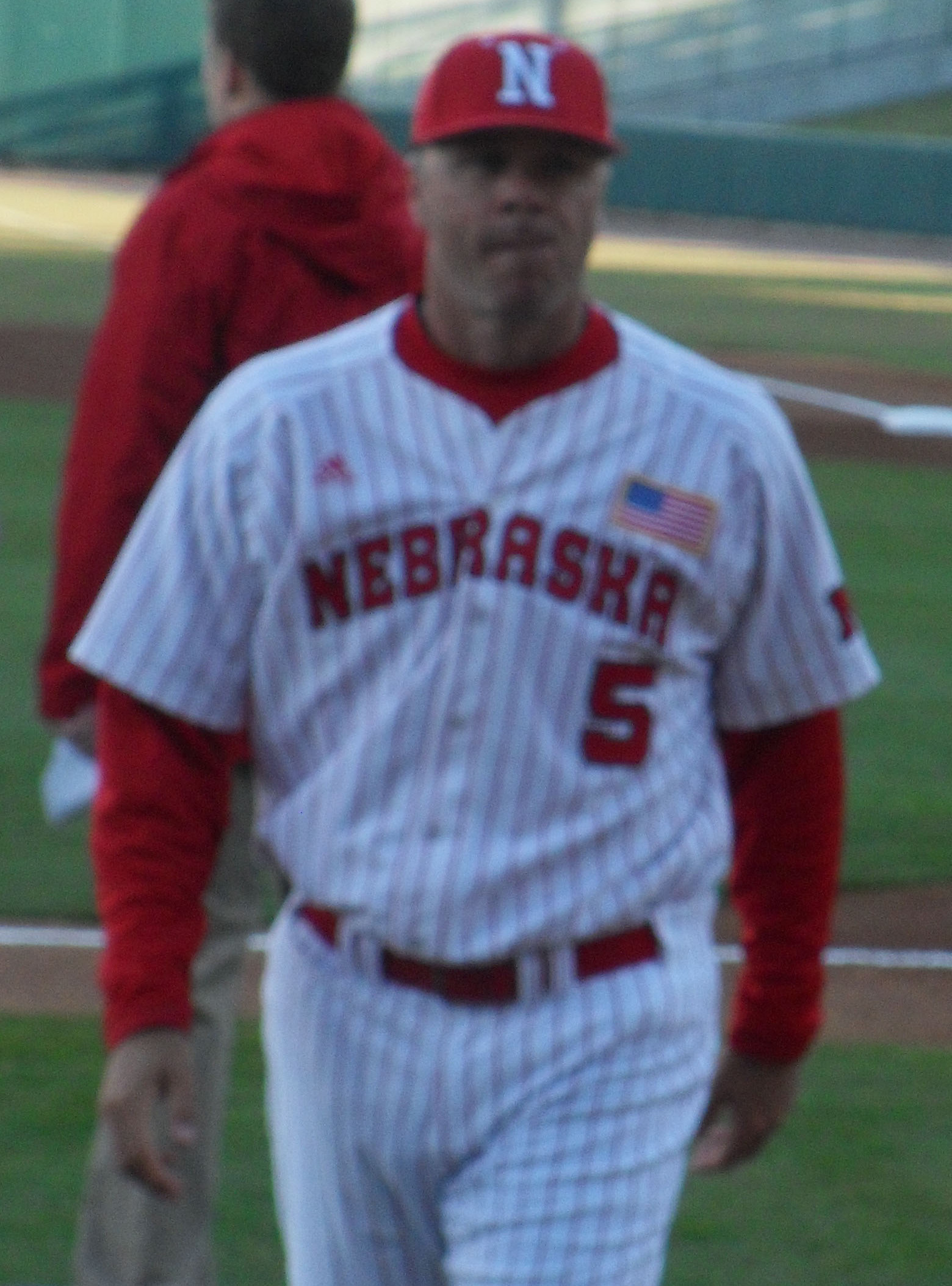
Anderson in 2011

Michael Anderson (born June 8, 1965) is an American baseball coach and former outfielder, who is the current head baseball coach of the Northern Colorado Bears. He played college baseball at Northern Colorado from 1983 to 1986. He played in Minor League Baseball (MiLB) for 4 seasons from 1986 to 1989. He served as the head coach of the Nebraska Cornhuskers (2003–2011).

In his first five seasons as the head coach, he compiled a 214–100 record. His greatest success came in 2005, when he guided Nebraska to a 57–15 record, while also taking the school to its first-ever College World Series win. The team finished with a school record national ranking of 5th, and it set a school record for highest national seed in the NCAA Division I Baseball Championship tournament (3rd). Anderson won Big 12 coach of the Year honors in 2003 and 2005, and in both seasons his team won the Big 12 conference title. The 2003 Big 12 championship made Anderson only the second Nebraska baseball coach since 1929 to win a conference title in his first season. In 2006, his team earned only the school's third-ever national seed (6th). He previously had served as an assistant with Nebraska from 1995 to 2002, a period when the school's baseball program began having success, most notably being the Huskers' first College World Series appearances in 2001 and 2002

== Coaching career ==
On May 22, 2011, Anderson was fired by Nebraska Athletic Director Tom Osborne.

On July 2, 2013, after a brief stint coaching Regis Jesuit High School in Aurora, Colorado, Anderson accepted an assistant coaching job for the Oklahoma Sooners to join Pete Hughes as hitting coach.

On June 23, 2022, Anderson was named the head coach at Northern Colorado.

== Head coaching record ==
Record table
Season	Team	Overall	Conference	Standing	Postseason
Nebraska Cornhuskers (Big 12 Conference) (2003–2011)
2003	Nebraska	47–18	20–7	1st	NCAA Regional
2004	Nebraska	36–23	11–16	8th	
2005	Nebraska	57–15	19–8	1st	College World Series
2006	Nebraska	42–17	17–10	4th	NCAA Regional
2007	Nebraska	32–27	14–13	4th	NCAA Regional
2008	Nebraska	41–16–1	17–9–1	3rd	NCAA Regional
2009	Nebraska	25–28–1	8–19	10th	
2010	Nebraska	27–27	10–17	9th	
2011	Nebraska	30–25	9–17	9th	
Nebraska:		337–196–2 (.632)	125–116–1 (.519)		
Northern Colorado Bears (Summit League) (2023–present)
2023	Northern Colorado	11–34	8–16	T–5th	
2024	Northern Colorado	16–38–1	13–16–1	T–4th	Summit League tournament
2025	Northern Colorado	18–33	9–21	6th	
Northern Colorado:		45–105–1 (.301)	30–53–1 (.363)		
Total:		382–301–3 (.559)			
National champion Postseason invitational champion Conference regular season champion Conference regular season and conference tournament champion Division regular season champion Division regular season and conference tournament champion Conference tournament champion
