= 2005 NCAA Division I baseball tournament =

American college sports championship

- Season: 2005
- Teams: 64
- Finals site: Johnny Rosenblatt Stadium; Omaha, Nebraska
- Champions: Texas (6th title)
- Runner-up: Florida (5th CWS Appearance)
- Winning coach: Augie Garrido (5th title)
- MOP: David Maroul (Texas)

The 2005 NCAA Division I baseball tournament was held from May 30 through June 26, 2005. Sixty-four NCAA Division I college baseball teams met after having played their way through a regular season, and for some, a conference tournament, to play in the NCAA tournament. The tournament culminated with 8 teams in the College World Series at historic Rosenblatt Stadium in Omaha, Nebraska.

A major format change for the regionals began in 2005. Rather than play both games of the championship round on the third day (usually Sunday) of the tournament, the "if necessary" championship game would be played on the fourth day of the tournament (usually Monday), allowing a team in the loser's bracket to rest some of its pitchers for a winner-take-all contest.

The home-state Nebraska Cornhuskers won their first College World Series game after going winless in their previous two appearances.

Texas went undefeated in the College World Series, earning its spot in the championship series with a walk-off home run against Big 12 Conference rival Baylor, before sweeping Florida in the championship series.

== Bids ==
=== Automatic bids ===
Conference champions from 30 Division I conferences earned automatic bids to regionals. The remaining 34 spots were awarded to schools as at-large invitees.

Conference	School	Berth type
America East	Maine	Tournament champion
ACC	Georgia Tech	Tournament champion
Atlantic Sun	Stetson	Tournament champion
A-10	Rhode Island	Tournament champion
Big 12	Nebraska	Tournament champion
Big East	Notre Dame	Tournament champion
Big South	Winthrop	Tournament champion
Big Ten	Ohio State	Tournament champion
Big West	Cal State Fullerton	Regular-season champion
CAA	VCU	Tournament champion
Conference USA	Tulane	Tournament champion
Horizon League	UIC	Tournament champion
Ivy League	Harvard	Championship series winner
MAAC	Marist	Tournament champion
MAC	Miami (OH)	Tournament champion
Mid-Con	Oral Roberts	Tournament champion
MEAC	North Carolina A&T	Tournament champion
Missouri Valley	Wichita State	Tournament champion
MWC	UNLV	Tournament champion
NEC	Quinnipiac	Tournament champion
OVC	Austin Peay	Tournament champion
Pac-10	Oregon State	Regular-season champion
Patriot League	Army	Tournament champion
SEC	Mississippi State	Tournament champion
SoCon	Furman	Tournament champion
Southland	UTSA	Tournament champion
SWAC	Southern	Tournament champion
Sun Belt	South Alabama	Tournament champion
WAC	Rice	Regular-season champion
WCC	Pepperdine	Championship series winner

=== Bids by conference ===
Conference	Total	Schools
Southeastern	9	Alabama, Arkansas, Auburn, Florida, LSU, Mississippi State, Ole Miss, South Carolina, Tennessee
Atlantic Coast	7	Clemson, Florida State, Georgia Tech, Miami (FL), North Carolina, NC State, Virginia
Big 12	5	Baylor, Missouri, Nebraska, Oklahoma, Texas
Pacific-10	5	Arizona, Arizona State, Oregon State, Southern California, Stanford
Conference USA	4	East Carolina, Southern Miss, TCU, Tulane
Atlantic Sun	2	Florida Atlantic, Stetson
Big East	2	Notre Dame, St. John's
Big South	2	Coastal Carolina, Winthrop
Big Ten	2	Michigan, Ohio State
Big West	2	Cal State Fullerton, Long Beach State
Missouri Valley	2	Creighton, Wichita State
Southern	2	College of Charleston, Furman
Southland	2	Northwestern State, UTSA
Sun Belt	2	Louisiana–Lafayette, South Alabama
America East	1	Maine
Atlantic 10	1	Rhode Island
Colonial Athletic	1	VCU
Horizon	1	UIC
Ivy	1	Harvard
Metro Atlantic	1	Marist
Mid-American	1	Miami (OH)
Mid-Continent	1	Oral Roberts
Mid-Eastern	1	North Carolina A&T
Mountain West	1	UNLV
Northeast	1	Quinnipiac
Ohio Valley	1	Austin Peay
Patriot	1	Army
Southwestern Athletic	1	Southern
Western Athletic	1	Rice
West Coast	1	Pepperdine

== Tournament notes ==
- North Carolina A&T, Quinnipiac and Rhode Island were making their first NCAA tournament appearance.

=== CWS records tied or broken ===
- Total attendance: 263,475 (previous record was 260,091 in 2003)
- Average single session attendance: 23,952
- No game was decided by more than five runs, making the 2005 CWS the closest-contended in history
- For the first time in CWS history, not a single player hit a triple
- Texas closer J. B. Cox tied the CWS record with five pitching appearances

== National seeds ==
Bold indicates CWS participant.

1. **Tulane**
2. Georgia Tech
3. **Nebraska**
4. **Baylor**
5. Ole Miss
6. Cal State Fullerton
7. **Florida**
8. **Oregon State**

== Regionals and super regionals ==
Bold indicates winner.

=== New Orleans Super Regional ===
First round	Second round
1	**Tulane**	**17**
4	Southern	7
1	**Tulane**	**10**
2	Alabama	4
3	Louisiana–Lafayette	5
2	**Alabama**	**7**
New Orleans Regional–Turchin Stadium
4	Southern	1
3	**Louisiana–Lafayette**	**9**
3	Louisiana–Lafayette	3
2	**Alabama**	**4**
1	**LSU**	**14**
4	Marist	5
1	LSU	7
2	**Rice**	**9**
3	Northwestern State	3
2	**Rice**	**7**
Baton Rouge Regional–Alex Box Stadium
4	Marist	3
3	**Northwestern State**	4
3	Northwestern State	4
1	**LSU**	**12**

Regional finals
1	**Tulane**	**7**	—
2	Alabama	4	—
2	**Rice**	**5**	—
1	LSU	4	—

Super regionals
1	**Tulane**	5	**7**	**9**
Rice	**9**	0	6

=== Atlanta Super Regional ===
First round	Second round
1	**Georgia Tech**	**5**^{10}
4	Furman	4
1	**Georgia Tech**	**10**
2	South Carolina	2
3	Michigan	5
2	**South Carolina**	**6**
Atlanta Regional–Russ Chandler Stadium
4	Furman	3
3	**Michigan**	**6**
3	Michigan	3
2	**South Carolina**	**4**
1	**Tennessee**	**7**
4	Austin Peay	5
1	**Tennessee**	**3**
2	Winthrop	2
3	Wichita State	1
2	**Winthrop**	**2**
Knoxville Regional–Lindsey Nelson Stadium
4	Austin Peay	1
3	**Wichita State**	**5**
3	**Wichita State**	**3**
2	Winthrop	2

Regional finals
1	**Georgia Tech**	3	**5**
2	South Carolina	**8**	0
1	**Tennessee**	**12**	—
3	Wichita State	2	—

Super regionals
2	Georgia Tech	2	3	—
**Tennessee**	**3**	**13**	—

=== Lincoln Super Regional ===
First round	Second round
1	**Nebraska**	**8**
4	UIC	6
1	**Nebraska**	**10**
3	Creighton	8
3	**Creighton**	**8**
2	NC State	3
Lincoln Regional–Haymarket Park
4	UIC	7
2	**NC State**	**9**
2	NC State	9
3	**Creighton**	**11**
1	**Miami (FL)**	**6**
4	VCU	2
1	**Miami (FL)**	**4**
2	Mississippi State	1
3	Florida Atlantic	2
2	**Mississippi State**	**11**
Coral Gables Regional–Mark Light Field
4	VCU	1
3	**Florida Atlantic**	**3**
3	Florida Atlantic	4
2	**Mississippi State**	**8**

Regional finals
1	**Nebraska**	**10**	—
3	Creighton	2	—
1	**Miami (FL)**	**10**	—
2	Mississippi State	4	—

Super regionals
3	**Nebraska**	**3**	**6**	—
Miami (FL)	1	3	—

=== Waco Super Regional ===
First round	Second round
1	**Baylor**	**8**
4	UTSA	3
1	**Baylor**	**8**
2	TCU	3
3	Stanford	1
2	**TCU**	**5**
Waco Regional–Baylor Ballpark
4	UTSA	2
3	**Stanford**	**6**
3	**Stanford**	**12**
2	TCU	4
1	**Clemson**	**12**
4	North Carolina A&T	2
1	**Clemson**	**6**
2	College of Charleston	0
3	Oral Roberts	2
2	**College of Charleston**	**5**
Clemson Regional–Doug Kingsmore Stadium
4	North Carolina A&T	3
3	**Oral Roberts**	**6**
3	**Oral Roberts**	**6**
2	College of Charleston	0

Regional finals
1	**Baylor**	**4**^{12}	—
3	Stanford	3	—
1	**Clemson**	**8**	—
3	Oral Roberts	3	—

Super regionals
4	**Baylor**	2	**7**	**6**
Clemson	**4**	1	1

=== Oxford Super Regional ===
First round	Second round
1	**Ole Miss**	**5**
4	Maine	0
1	**Ole Miss**	**7**
3	Oklahoma	3
3	**Oklahoma**	**5**
2	Southern Miss	4
Oxford Regional–Swayze Field
4	**Maine**	**12**
2	Southern Miss	2
4	Maine	10
3	**Oklahoma**	**11**
1	**Texas**	**20**
4	Quinnipiac	2
1	Texas	2
2	**Arkansas**	**9**
3	Miami (OH)	5
2	**Arkansas**	**9**
Austin Regional–Disch–Falk Field
4	Quinnipiac	8
3	**Miami (OH)**	**35**
3	Miami (OH)	5
1	**Texas**	**12**

Regional finals
1	**Ole Miss**	**20**	—
3	Oklahoma	5	—
2	Arkansas	8	2
1	**Texas**	**19**	**5**

Super regionals
5	Ole Miss	**6**	1	4
**Texas**	4	**3**	**6**

=== Fullerton Super Regional ===
First round	Second round
1	**Cal State Fullerton**	**19**
4	Harvard	5
1	Cal State Fullerton	5
2	**Arizona**	**6**
3	Missouri	3
2	**Arizona**	**5**
Fullerton Regional–Goodwin Field
4	Harvard	6
3	**Missouri**	**14**
3	Missouri	6
1	**Cal State Fullerton**	**8**
1	**Coastal Carolina**	**12**
4	UNLV	8
1	Coastal Carolina	3
2	**Arizona State**	**11**
3	East Carolina	6
2	**Arizona State**	**9**
Tempe Regional–Packard Stadium
4	**UNLV**	**5**
3	East Carolina	3
4	UNLV	10
1	**Coastal Carolina**	**14**

Regional finals
2	Arizona	2	3
1	**Cal State Fullerton**	**7**	**6**
2	**Arizona State**	**9**	—
1	Coastal Carolina	5	—

Super regionals
6	Cal State Fullerton	**3**	2	8
**Arizona State**	2	**6**	**9**

=== Gainesville Super Regional ===
First round	Second round
1	**Florida**	**8**
4	Stetson	3
1	**Florida**	**5**
2	North Carolina	2
3	Notre Dame	1
2	**North Carolina**	**5**
Gainesville Regional–McKethan Stadium
4	Stetson	4
3	**Notre Dame**	**7**
3	**Notre Dame**	**3**
2	North Carolina	0
1	**Florida State**	**3**
4	Army	2
1	**Florida State**	**4**
2	Auburn	3
3	South Alabama	5
2	**Auburn**	**13**
Tallahassee Regional–Dick Howser Stadium
4	**Army**	**8**
3	South Alabama	5
4	Army	3
2	**Auburn**	**12**

Regional finals
1	**Florida**	**23**	—
3	Notre Dame	3	—
1	**Florida State**	**10**	—
2	Auburn	4	—

Super regionals
7	**Florida**	**8**	**8**	—
Florida State	1	5	—

=== Corvallis Super Regional ===
First round	Second round
1	**Oregon State**	**4**
4	Ohio State	3
1	**Oregon State**	**11**
3	St. John's	1
3	**St. John's**	**5**
2	Virginia	3
Corvallis Regional–Goss Stadium
4	**Ohio State**	**2**
2	Virginia	1
4	Ohio State	1
3	**St. John's**	**11**
1	**Long Beach State**	**11**
4	Rhode Island	2
1	Long Beach State	4
2	**Southern California**	**6**
3	Pepperdine	3
2	**Southern California**	**7**
Long Beach Regional–Blair Field
4	Rhode Island	1
3	**Pepperdine**	**2**
3	**Pepperdine**	**6**
1	Long Beach State	3

Regional finals
1	**Oregon State**	**19**	—
3	St. John's	3	—
2	**Southern California**	2	**5**
3	Pepperdine	**9**	2

Super regionals
8	**Oregon State**	**10**	8	**10**
Southern California	4	**9**^{10}	8

== College World Series ==
=== Participants ===
School	Conference	Record (conference)	Head coach	CWS appearances	Best CWS finish	CWS record Not including this year
Tulane	C-USA	55–10 (24–6)	Rick Jones	2 (last: 2001)	5th (2001)	1–2
Tennessee	SEC	43–19 (18–11)	Rod Delmonico	3 (last: 2001)	2nd (1951)	8–6
Nebraska	Big 12	56–13 (19–8)	Mike Anderson	2 (last: 2002)	7th (2001, 2002)	0–4
Baylor	Big 12	44–22 (19–8)	Steve Smith	2 (last: 1978)	7th (1977, 1978)	0–4
Texas	Big 12	51–16 (16–10)	Augie Garrido	31 (last: 2004)	1st (1949, 1950, 1975, 1983, 2002)	73–53
Arizona State	Pac-10	39–23 (15–9)	Pat Murphy	18 (last: 1998)	1st (1965, 1967, 1969, 1977, 1981)	55–30
Florida	SEC	45–20 (20–10)	Pat McMahon	4 (last: 1998)	3rd (1991, 1996)	5–8
Oregon State	Pac-10	46–10 (19–5)	Pat Casey	1 (last: 1952)	7th (1952)	0–2

=== Bracket ===
First round
Tennessee	4
7	**Florida**	**6**
Arizona State	3
3	**Nebraska**	**5**
Tennessee	2
**Arizona State**	**4**
8	Oregon State	1
1	**Tulane**	**3**
**Texas**	**5**
4	Baylor	1
8	Oregon State	3
4	**Baylor**	**4**^{10}

Second round
7	**Florida**	**7**
3	Nebraska	4
**Arizona State**	**8**^{11}
3	Nebraska	7
1	Tulane	0
**Texas**	**5**
4	**Baylor**	**8**
1	Tulane	7

Semifinals
7	**Florida**	1	**6**
Arizona State	**6**	3
**Texas**	**4**	—
4	Baylor	3	—

Finals
7	Florida	2	2	—
**Texas**	**4**	**6**	—

=== National championship series ===
==== Game 1 – Texas 4, Florida 2 ====
Saturday, June 25, 2005 6:14 pm (CT) at Johnny Rosenblatt Stadium in Omaha, Nebraska Game 1
Team	1	2	3	4	5	6	7	8	9	R	H	E
**Texas**	1	0	1	2	0	0	0	0	0	**4**	**8**	**2**
Florida	0	0	0	0	0	0	0	2	0	**2**	**4**	**3**
WP: Adrian Alaniz (8–3) LP: Stephen Locke (5–2) Sv: J. Brent Cox (18); Attendance: 25,958; Boxscore

==== Game 2 – Texas 6, Florida 2 ====
Sunday, June 26, 2005 2:11 pm (CT) at Johnny Rosenblatt Stadium in Omaha, Nebraska Game 2
Team	1	2	3	4	5	6	7	8	9	R	H	E
Florida	0	0	0	0	0	0	2	0	0	**2**	**6**	**1**
**Texas**	0	1	0	1	0	4	0	0	X	**6**	**10**	**0**
WP: Kyle McCulloch (12–4) LP: Bryan Ball (7–6) Sv: J. Brent Cox (19); Attendance: 19,836; Notes: Texas wins sixth CWS title Boxscore

=== All-Tournament Team ===
The following players were members of the College World Series All-Tournament Team.

Position	Player	School
P	J. B. Cox	Texas
P	Kyle McCulloch	Texas
C	Taylor Teagarden	Texas
1B	Jeff Larish	Arizona State
2B	Joey Hooft	Arizona State
3B	**David Maroul (MOP)**	Texas
SS	Seth Johnston	Texas
OF	Travis Buck	Arizona State
OF	Colin Curtis	Arizona State
OF	Andy Gerch	Nebraska
DH	Will Crouch	Texas
