= Taylor Teagarden =

American baseball player (born 1983)

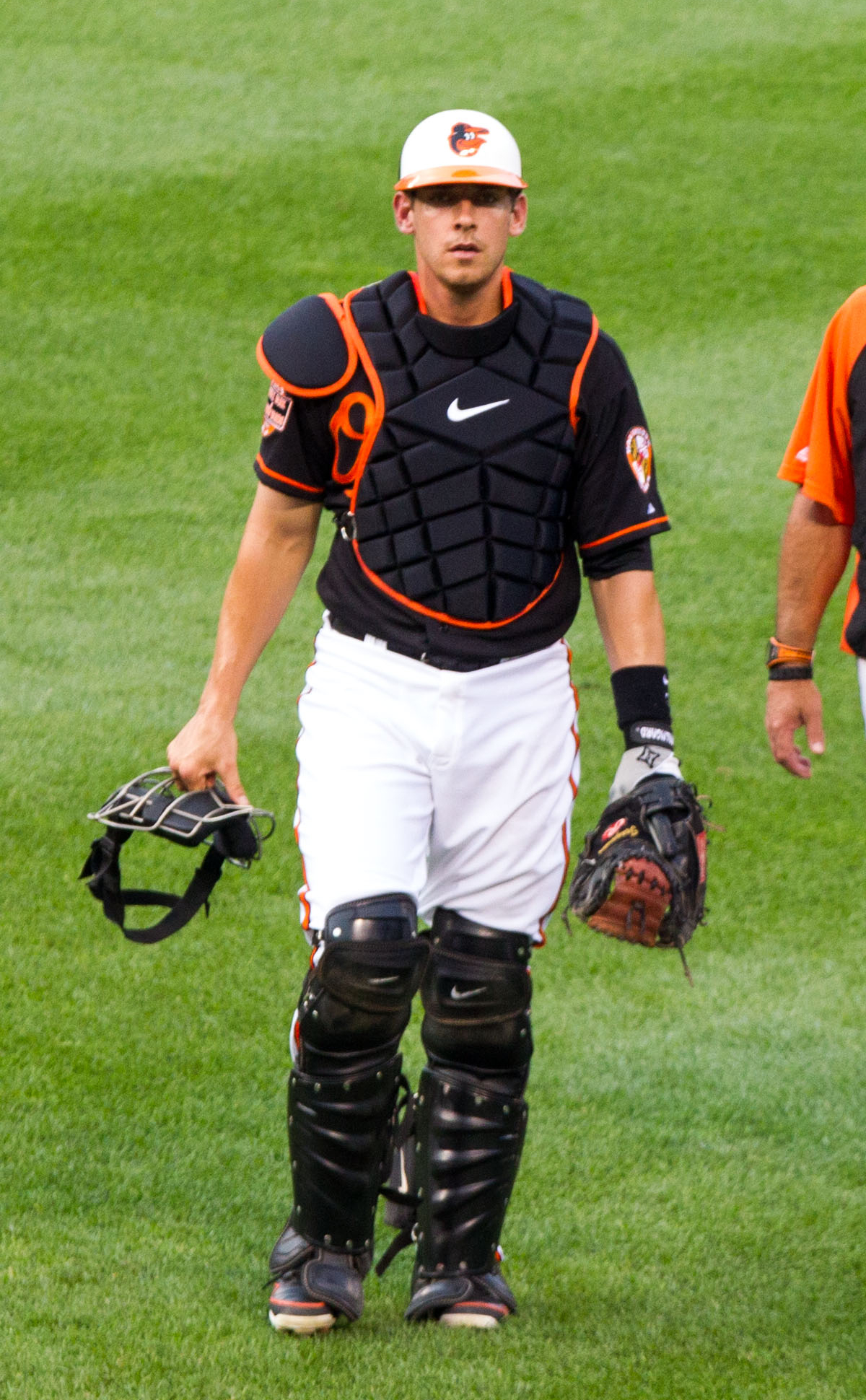
- Teagarden with the Baltimore Orioles in 2012
- Catcher
- Born: December 21, 1983 (age 42); Dallas, Texas, U.S.
- Batted: Right Threw: Right

MLB debut
- July 18, 2008, for the Texas Rangers

Last MLB appearance
- July 26, 2015, for the Chicago Cubs

Career statistics
- Batting average: .202
- Home runs: 21
- Runs batted in: 70
- Stats at Baseball Reference

Teams
- Texas Rangers (2008–2011); Baltimore Orioles (2012–2013); New York Mets (2014); Chicago Cubs (2015)
Medals
Men's baseball
Representing United States
Olympic Games
Bronze medal – third place	2008 Beijing	Team competition
World University Championship
Gold medal – first place	2004 Tainan	National team

Taylor Hill Teagarden (born December 21, 1983) is an American former professional baseball catcher. He played in Major League Baseball (MLB) from 2008 to 2015 for the Texas Rangers, Baltimore Orioles, New York Mets, and Chicago Cubs.

== Early life ==
Teagarden graduated from Creekview High School in Carrollton, Texas in 2002.

Teagarden attended the University of Texas at Austin, where he was a catcher on the Texas Longhorns baseball team. Most notably, Teagarden played on the Longhorns' 2005 NCAA Championship team, which won the College World Series.

== Professional career ==
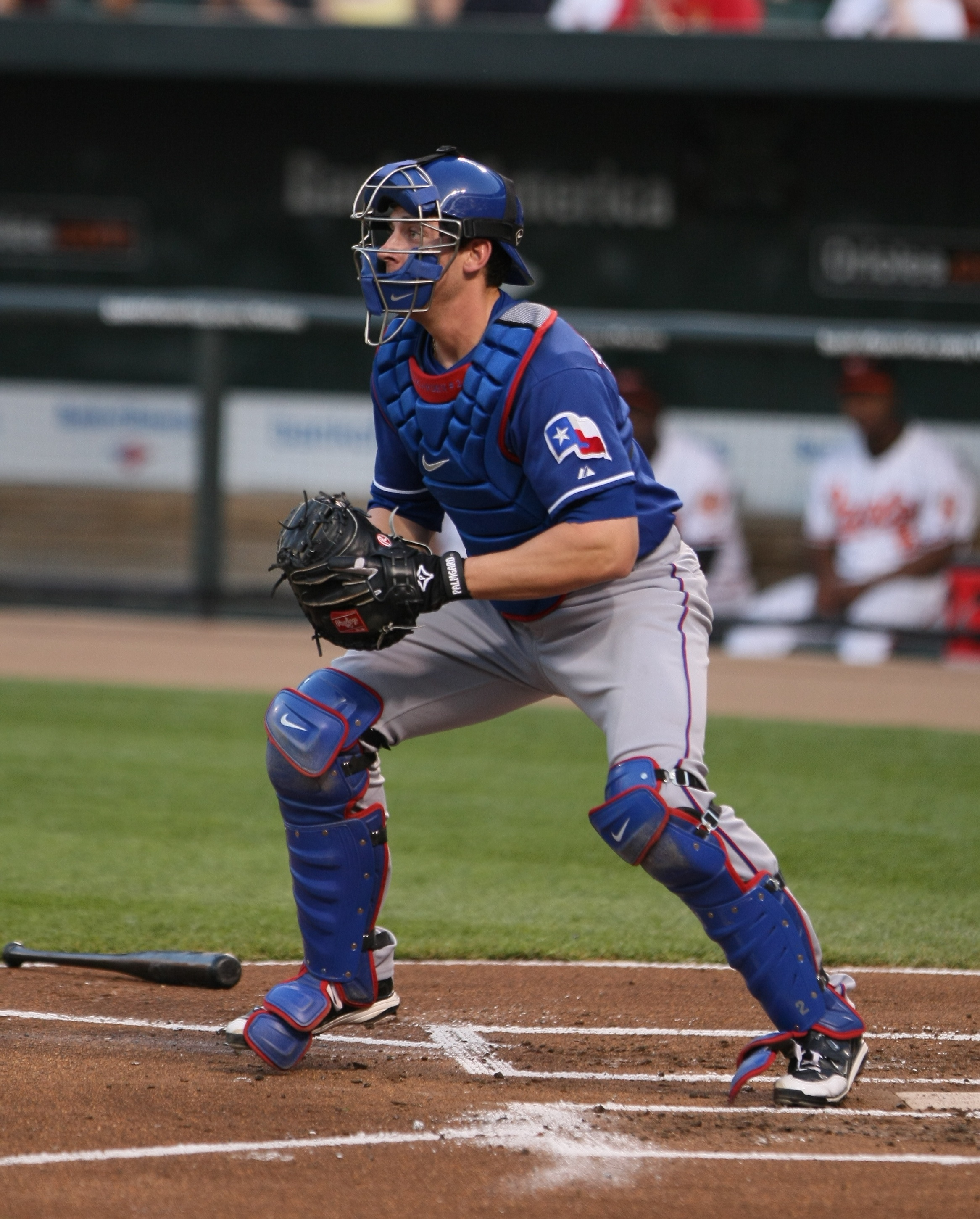
Teagarden playing for the Texas Rangers in 2009

=== Texas Rangers ===
Taylor was drafted in the third round of the 2005 Major League Baseball draft by the Texas Rangers. His first major league hit (a solo home run) happened on July 20, 2008. It came off Minnesota Twins pitcher Scott Baker in the top of the 6th, who, until then, had not given up a hit all game. It would end up being the only run of the game in a Rangers 1–0 victory. In his first 40 plate appearances he had 10 extra base hits, a record tied in 2018 by first baseman Rowdy Tellez for the most by any ballplayer since 1913. Teagarden played for the 2008 USA Olympic Team.

Sent to the Double-A Frisco RoughRiders early in the 2010 season, Teagarden was called back up to the Majors in July 2010 due to the injuries of catcher Matt Treanor. While at Double-A Frisco, he finished fourth in the fan vote for A.L. catcher for the 2010 All-Star game with 631,674 votes, above Major League catchers John Buck of the Blue Jays, Mike Napoli of the Angels and A. J. Pierzynski of the White Sox. Teagarden hit three home runs in his first five games after his July recall from the minors.

=== Baltimore Orioles ===
On December 1, 2011, Teagarden was traded to the Baltimore Orioles in exchange for minor league pitcher Randy Henry. However, he began the 2012 season on the disabled list due to lower-back injuries. Teagarden was cleared to begin baseball activities on June 1, 2012, and began his minor league rehab games with the Double-A Bowie Baysox on July 6. On the same day, he was activated by the Orioles off the disabled list on July 14, he hit a two-run, two-out homer off Joaquín Benoit to end a 13-inning 8–6 victory over the Detroit Tigers at Camden Yards. In 22 games for Baltimore, Teagarden batted .158/.226/.316 with two home runs and nine RBI.

Teagarden made 23 appearances for the Orioles during the 2013 campaign, slashing .167/.180/.300 with two home runs and five RBI. He was designated for assignment by Baltimore on September 1, 2013, following the promotion of Chris Snyder, On September 5, Teagarden cleared waivers and was sent outright to the Triple-A Norfolk Tides. He became a free agent on October 1.

=== New York Mets ===
Teagarden signed a minor league deal with the New York Mets with an invite to Spring Training on January 6, 2014. The Mets selected Teagarden's contract from the Triple-A Las Vegas 51s on June 8. He hit a grand slam in his first game for the Mets on June 10 against the Milwaukee Brewers, the second grand slam of his career. In nine appearances for New York, Teagarden went 4-for-28 (.143) with one home run and five RBI. Teagarden elected free agency on October 6.

=== Chicago Cubs ===
On January 10, 2015, Teagarden signed a minor league contract with the Chicago Cubs. On July 4, the Cubs needed catching depth and called up Teagarden to backup starter Miguel Montero behind the plate. Teagarden was batting .294 with 19 RBI in 43 games for the Triple-A Iowa Cubs. In 8 games for Chicago, he went 3-for-15 (.200) with 2 RBI. On August 2, Teagarden was designated for assignment by the Cubs. He cleared waivers and was sent outright to Triple-A Iowa on August 7.

=== PED usage ===
On December 26, 2015, Teagarden was named in an Al Jazeera report linking him to performance-enhancing drugs (PED) usage. Teagarden is shown in an undercover video talking about his PED usage in years past. Teagarden initially made no comment on the video. On April 1, 2016 Teagarden was suspended 80 games for violating the MLB's Joint Drug Prevention and Treatment Program.

Teagarden ended his career following the conclusion of the 2017 season.
