= Joe Simokaitis =

American college baseball coach and player

Biographical details
- Born: December 27, 1982 (age 43); St. Louis, Missouri, U.S.

Playing career
- 2002–2005: Nebraska
- 2005: Peoria Chiefs
- 2006: Daytona Cubs
- 2007–2008: Tennessee Smokies
- 2007–2008: Iowa Cubs
- 2008: High Desert Mavericks
- 2009: Arizona League Cubs
- 2009: Boise Hawks
- 2009: Daytona Cubs
- Position: Shortstop

Coaching career (HC unless noted)
- 2011–2012: Nebraska (undergrad)
- 2013–2014: St. Louis (MO) St. Mary's HS
- 2016–2018: St. Louis Community College–Meramec (assistant)
- 2019: Saint Louis (assistant)

Joe Simokaitis (born December 27, 1982) is an American college baseball coach and former professional baseball shortstop. After playing with the Cornhuskers, Simokaitis played for four years in the Chicago Cubs system. He retired in 2010 and returned to Nebraska.

== High school ==
Simokaitis went to St. Mary's High School in St. Louis and earned 12 letters (four each in football, basketball and baseball). He did better in his junior year than his senior year as he hit .420 with 7 homers and 43 RBIs. He led the team to a 3rd-place finish in the state tournament in his senior season. According to Baseball America, he was the top high school prospect in the state with a .386 average and 2 home runs, 19 RBIs, and 24 runs. He became an All-South Metro St. Louis and a first-team all-state selection both years. He selected Nebraska over St. Louis, Wichita State, Southwest Missouri State, Florida and Missouri. He also became a two-time all-district selection in football. In his senior year he had 1,200 all-purpose yards on offense and had 56 tackles and 6 interceptions on defense becoming the conference player of the year. He was recruited by Missouri and Illinois.

== Nebraska ==
Simokaitis played for Nebraska all 4 years in his college career. In 2002, he was 1 of 2 freshman in the everyday lineup but played at shortstop in only 41 games. He hit a .236 average with 16 RBIs and led the team with 9 sacrifice bunts helping the huskers reach the 2002 College World Series going 2-5 and 2 runs scored in Omaha. As a sophomore, Joe became the full starter at shortstop. He hit .293 with 39 RBIs, 70 hits, 53 runs and a homer. He led the team again in sac bunts with 16 and second with 9 stolen bases. He broke Nebraska's single season record with 194 assists. Simokaitis started in 56 of the Huskers' 59 games in 2004, hitting .278 with 33 RBIs, 31 runs and a home run. After the 2004 season, he played collegiate summer baseball with the Bourne Braves of the Cape Cod Baseball League. In his senior season Simokaitis hit .310 with 37 RBIs, 53 runs, 86 hits and 3 homers, helping the team to the 2005 College World Series. He was drafted by the Chicago Cubs in the 10th round of the 2005 Major League Baseball draft.

== Minor League ==
In 2006 Simokaitis played for the Class A Advanced Daytona Cubs in the Florida State League, hitting .259 in 110 games with 83 hits, 32 RBIs and 47 runs. He was promoted to the AA Tennessee Smokies in the Southern League for the 2007 season and had a .257 average with 54 hits, 15 RBIs and 3 homers in 76 games. He was promoted to the AAA Cubs where he hit .253 in 19 games. On August 10, 2009, Simokaitis was released by the Chicago Cubs.

== Awards ==
- 2000 First-Team All-State
- 2001 First-Team All-State
- 2003 Dairy Queen Classic All-Tournament Team
- 2003 Honorable-Mention All-Big 12
- 2004 Honorable-Mention All-Big 12
- 2005 Second-Team All-Big 12

== Sources ==
- Career statistics from Baseball Reference (Minors)
- Simokaitis' leadership has been key to Nebraska's Big 12, NCAA success Lincoln Journal Star, June 8, 2005
- Joe Simokaitis 2005 Baseball Bio at University of Nebraska
- Joe Simokaitis Stats, Highlights, Bio at MiLB
- Joe Simokaitis at The Baseball Cube
