= J. B. Cox =

American baseball player

J. Brent Cox
- Pitcher
- Born: May 13, 1984 (age 41); Bay City, Texas, U.S.
- Bats: Left Throws: Right
- Stats at Baseball Reference

J. Brent Cox (born May 13, 1984) is an American former baseball relief pitcher.

== Career ==
Cox attended the University of Texas. With the Texas Longhorns baseball team, Cox set the record for the most appearances in the College World Series with 13 and in 2005 tied the UT record with Charlie Thames for most saves in a single season with 19.

Cox was drafted by the New York Yankees in the 2nd round of the 2005 Major League Baseball draft. Cox had a 6-2 win–loss record and a 1.75 earned run average for the Trenton Thunder of the Class AA Eastern League in 2006. That year, Mark Feinsand of MLB.com wrote, "Some are projecting him as the eventual replacement for all-world closer Mariano Rivera."

In 2006, Cox was named to the Olympic Qualifying Team roster. He pitched in three games for the U.S. national team, allowing one run in 5.2 innings. In 2007, Cox was listed as the eighth best prospect in the New York Yankees organization and owning the best slider in the farm system.

The Yankees invited Cox to spring training in 2007, but rescinded the invitation after he broke a bone in his pitching hand in a bar fight in December 2006. He had elbow surgery and missed the entire 2007 season. After a bad game in June 2009, Cox left the Thunder without permission. He returned to Texas to complete his college degree. Noticing that his arm was beginning to feel better, he returned to professional baseball in 2010. In September 2010, he got into an altercation with Thunder manager Tony Franklin after Franklin removed him from a game. He retired after the season.

Cox was hired as a volunteer student assistant for the Texas Longhorns after retiring from playing.
