= 2017 Indiana Hoosiers baseball team =

Baseball team iteration

2017 Indiana Hoosiers baseball

Lexington Regional, L 9–14 vs. Kentucky
- Conference: Big Ten Conference
- Record: 34–24–2 (14–9–1 Big Ten)
- Head coach: Chris Lemonis (3rd season)
- Pitching coach: Kyle Bunn (3rd season)
- Captains: Tony Butler; Luke Stephenson
- Home stadium: Bart Kaufman Field (Capacity: 2,500)

2017 Big Ten Conference baseball standings
	Conf.						Overall
Team	W		L		T	PCT	W		L		T	PCT
Nebraska ‍†‍‍^{y}	16	–	7	–	1	.688	35	–	22	–	1	.612
Michigan ‍‍‍^{y}	16	–	8	–	0	.667	42	–	17	–	0	.712
Minnesota ‍‍‍	15	–	8	–	0	.652	36	–	21	–	0	.632
Iowa ‍‍‡‍^{y}	15	–	9	–	0	.625	39	–	22	–	0	.639
Maryland ‍‍‍^{y}	15	–	9	–	0	.625	38	–	23	–	0	.623
Indiana ‍‍‍^{y}	14	–	9	–	1	.604	34	–	24	–	2	.583
Northwestern ‍‍‍	13	–	11	–	0	.542	27	–	30	–	0	.474
Purdue ‍‍‍	12	–	12	–	0	.500	29	–	27	–	0	.518
Michigan State ‍‍‍	10	–	14	–	0	.417	29	–	23	–	0	.558
Illinois ‍‍‍	9	–	15	–	0	.375	23	–	28	–	0	.451
Ohio State ‍‍‍	8	–	16	–	0	.333	22	–	34	–	0	.393
Rutgers ‍‍‍	7	–	16	–	0	.304	19	–	34	–	0	.358
Penn State ‍‍‍	4	–	20	–	0	.167	18	–	37	–	0	.327
† – Conference champion ‡ – Tournament champion y – Invited to the NCAA tournament Rankings from Collegiate Baseball

The 2017 Indiana Hoosiers baseball team is a baseball team that represented Indiana University in the 2017 NCAA Division I baseball season. The Hoosiers are members of the Big Ten Conference and played their home games at Bart Kaufman Field in Bloomington, Indiana. They were led by third-year head coach Chris Lemonis.

Following the conclusion of the regular season, the Hoosiers were selected to play in the 2017 NCAA tournament, beginning in the Lexington Regional. The Hoosiers would eventually lose in the second round of the Lexington Regional to Kentucky by a score of 9–14. Two players from the team (Craig Dedelow and Luke Miller) were selected in the MLB draft.

== Previous season ==
The Hoosiers finished the 2016 NCAA Division I baseball season 32–24 overall (15–9 conference) and fourth place in conference standings. The Hoosiers would lose in the second round of the 2016 Big Ten Conference baseball tournament to Maryland, 3–0. Indiana would not be selected to play in the 2016 NCAA Division I baseball tournament.

=== MLB draft ===
The following Hoosiers on the 2016 roster were selected in the 2016 Major League Baseball draft:

List of Drafted Players
Name	2016 Class	Pos.	Team	Round	Signed/Returned
Caleb Baragar	Senior	LHP	San Francisco Giants	9th	Signed*
Jake Kelzer	Senior	RHP	Philadelphia Phillies	18th	Signed*
Kyle Hart	Senior	LHP	Boston Red Sox	19th	Signed*
Craig Dedelow	Junior	CF	Pittsburgh Pirates	34th	Returned

* indicates draftee had no more college eligibility

== Preseason ==
On August 22, 2016, head coach Lemonis promoted pitching coach Kyle Bunn to Associate head coach. On December 12, 2016, Lemonis named senior infielder Tony Butler and senior right-handed pitcher Luke Stephenson to Captain status for the 2017 year. On January 19, 2017, the Big Ten Conference announced that the 2017 Big Ten baseball tournament will be held at Bart Kaufman Field.

== Roster ==
2017 Indiana Hoosiers baseball team
Players
Coaches

#	Pos.	Name	B/T	Height	Weight	Year	Previous school	Home town
1	INF	Jeremy Houston	R/R	5 ft 8 in (1.73 m)	175 lb (79 kg)	Fr	Mount Carmel	Chicago, Illinois
2	OF	Alex Krupa	L/L	5 ft 8 in (1.73 m)	182 lb (83 kg)	Sr	Greenwood	Greenwood, Indiana
4	INF	Tony Butler	R/R	6 ft 1 in (1.85 m)	198 lb (90 kg)	Sr	Sun Prairie	Sun Prairie, Wisconsin
6	RHP	Kade Kryzsko	R/R	6 ft 2 in (1.88 m)	185 lb (84 kg)	Jr	Kentwood	Kent, Washington
7	INF	Matt Gorski	R/R	6 ft 4 in (1.93 m)	195 lb (88 kg)	Fr	Hamilton Southeastern	Fishers, Indiana
8	INF	Luke Miller	R/R	6 ft 3 in (1.91 m)	184 lb (83 kg)	So	Cowen	Muncie, Indiana
9	LHP	Tim Herrin	L/L	6 ft 5 in (1.96 m)	212 lb (96 kg)	So	South Vigo	Terre Haute, Indiana
12	LHP	B.J. Sabol	L/L	6 ft 1 in (1.85 m)	195 lb (88 kg)	Jr	Lake Country Lutheran	Hartland, Wisconsin
13	RHP	Cal Krueger	R/R	6 ft 0 in (1.83 m)	185 lb (84 kg)	Fr	Jasper	Jasper, Indiana
14	INF	Matt Lloyd	L/R	6 ft 1 in (1.85 m)	195 lb (88 kg)	So	Foothills Composite	Okotoks, Alberta, Canada
15	RHP	Pauly Milto	R/R	6 ft 3 in (1.91 m)	240 lb (109 kg)	So	Roncalli	Greenwood, Indiana
16	C	Eric Hansen	R/R	5 ft 9 in (1.75 m)	182 lb (83 kg)	So	Marist	Homer Glen, Illinois
17	OF	Laren Eustace	L/L	5 ft 9 in (1.75 m)	175 lb (79 kg)	Jr	Batavia	Batavia, Illinois
18	INF	Austin Cangelosi	R/R	6 ft 1 in (1.85 m)	204 lb (93 kg)	Sr	Carl Sandburg	Orland Park, Illinois
19	RHP	Brad Littleton	R/R	6 ft 1 in (1.85 m)	190 lb (86 kg)	Fr	Coal City	Coal City, Illinois
21	C	Jake Matheny	R/R	6 ft 2 in (1.88 m)	185 lb (84 kg)	Fr	Westminster Christian	St. Louis, Missouri
23	LHP	Andrew Saalfrank	L/L	6 ft 3 in (1.91 m)	205 lb (93 kg)	Fr	Heritage	Hoagland, Indiana
24	LHP	Matt Petrosino	L/L	6 ft 1 in (1.85 m)	180 lb (82 kg)	Fr	Don Bosco	Oakland, New Jersey
26	OF	Chris Lowe	R/R	6 ft 2 in (1.88 m)	197 lb (89 kg)	Jr	Poway	Poway, California
28	INF	Pat Loeffler	L/R	6 ft 1 in (1.85 m)	195 lb (88 kg)	Fr	Stevenson	Vernon Hills, Illinois
29	C	Ryan Fineman	R/R	6 ft 0 in (1.83 m)	215 lb (98 kg)	So	Agoura	Westlake Village, California
30	INF	Scotty Bradley	L/R	6 ft 2 in (1.88 m)	221 lb (100 kg)	So	Hopewell Valley Central	Pennington, New Jersey
33	LHP	Austin Foote	L/L	6 ft 3 in (1.91 m)	179 lb (81 kg)	Jr	Lake Zurich	Lake Zurich, Illinois
34	RHP	Jonathan Stiever	R/R	6 ft 1 in (1.85 m)	188 lb (85 kg)	So	Cedarburg	Cedarburg, Wisconsin
35	RHP	Brandon Kelley	R/R	6 ft 3 in (1.91 m)	200 lb (91 kg)	Jr	Homeschooled	Evansville, Indiana
36	INF	Colby Stratten	R/R	6 ft 1 in (1.85 m)	165 lb (75 kg)	Jr	Bloomington North	Bloomington, Indiana
39	OF	Craig Dedelow	L/R	6 ft 4 in (1.93 m)	194 lb (88 kg)	Sr	Munster	Munster, Indiana
40	RHP	Brian Hobbie	R/R	6 ft 4 in (1.93 m)	227 lb (103 kg)	Jr	Glenwood	Springfield, Illinois
42	RHP	Grant Sloan	R/R	6 ft 4 in (1.93 m)	190 lb (86 kg)	So	Zionsville Community High School	Zionsville, Indiana
42	RHP	Luke Stephenson	R/R	6 ft 2 in (1.88 m)	195 lb (88 kg)	Sr	Triton Central	Indianapolis, Indiana
44	LHP	Cameron Beauchamp	L/L	6 ft 2 in (1.88 m)	205 lb (93 kg)	Sr	Peru High School	Peru, Indiana
45	RHP	Justin Reed	R/R	6 ft 1 in (1.85 m)	185 lb (84 kg)	Fr	Lawrence North	Lawrence, Indiana
51	OF	Logan Sowers	R/R	6 ft 4 in (1.93 m)	220 lb (100 kg)	Jr	McCutcheon	Lafayette, Indiana

Head coach

Chris Lemonis

Assistant coach(es)

Kyle Bunn

Legend

- (C) Team captain
- (S) Suspended
- (I) Ineligible
- Injured
- Current redshirt

Roster
Last update: March 2, 2017

== Schedule ==
Legend
Indiana win
Indiana loss
Postponement

2017 Indiana Hoosiers baseball game log
Regular season
February

#	Date	Opponent	Venue	Score	Overall record	B1G Record
1	February 17	vs #5 Oregon State	Surprise Stadium • Surprise, Arizona	0–1	0–1	–
2	February 18	vs Gonzaga	Surprise Stadium • Surprise, Arizona	12–3	1–1	–
3	February 18	vs Gonzaga	Surprise Stadium • Surprise, Arizona	5–1	2–1	–
4	February 19	vs #5 Oregon State	Surprise Stadium • Surprise, Arizona	1–4	2–2	–
5	February 24	at Florida Atlantic	FAU Baseball Stadium • Boca Raton, Florida,	8–4	3–2	–
6	February 25	at Florida Atlantic	FAU Baseball Stadium • Boca Raton, Florida	2–6	3–3	–
7	February 26	at Florida Atlantic	FAU Baseball Stadium • Boca Raton, Florida	6–6	3–3–1	–

March

#	Date	Opponent	Venue	Score	Overall record	B1G Record
8	March 1	at Cincinnati	Marge Schott Stadium • Cincinnati, Ohio,	1–6	3–4–1	–
9	March 3	at Samford	Joe Lee Griffin Stadium • Birmingham, Alabama	10–5	4–4–1	–
10	March 4	at Samford	Joe Lee Griffin Stadium • Birmingham, Alabama	5–6	4–5–1	–
11	March 5	at Samford	Joe Lee Griffin Stadium • Birmingham, Alabama	3–5	4–6–1	–
12	March 7	at Evansville	Charles H. Braun Stadium • Evansville, Indiana	Cancelled	4–6–1	–
13	March 10	Middle Tennessee	Bart Kaufman Field • Bloomington, Indiana	3–5	4–7–1	–
14	March 11	Middle Tennessee	Bart Kaufman Field • Bloomington, Indiana	12–1	5–7–1	–
15	March 12	Middle Tennessee	Bart Kaufman Field • Bloomington, Indiana	6–0	6–7–1	–
16	March 15	at Hawaii	Les Murakami Stadium • Honolulu, Hawaii	7–6	7–7–1	–
17	March 16	at Hawaii	Les Murakami Stadium • Honolulu, Hawaii	4–3	8–7–1	–
18	March 17	at Hawaii	Les Murakami Stadium • Honolulu, Hawaii	8–5	9–7–1	–
19	March 18	at Hawaii	Les Murakami Stadium • Honolulu, Hawaii	10–11	9–8–1	–
20	March 22	Cincinnati	Bart Kaufman Field • Bloomington, Indiana	3–2	10–8–1	–
21	March 24	at Northwestern	Rocky Miller Park • Evanston, Illinois,	13–9	11–8–1	1–0
22	March 25	at Northwestern	Rocky Miller Park • Evanston, Illinois	6–5	12–8–1	2–0
23	March 26	at Northwestern	Rocky Miller Park • Evanston, Illinois	10–9	13–8–1	3–0
24	March 28	Evansville	Bart Kaufman Field • Bloomington, Indiana	6–3	14–8–1	3–0
25	March 29	Indiana State	Bart Kaufman Field • Bloomington, Indiana	3–7	14–9–1	3–0
25	March 31	Nebraska	Bart Kaufman Field • Bloomington, Indiana	3–7	14–10–1	3–1

April

#	Date	Opponent	Venue	Score	Overall record	B1G Record
26	April 1	Nebraska	Bart Kaufman Field • Bloomington, Indiana	1–3	14–11–1	3–2
27	April 2	Nebraska	Bart Kaufman Field • Bloomington, Indiana	1–1	14–11–2	3–2–1
28	April 4	Ball State	Bart Kaufman Field • Bloomington, Indiana	3–2	15–11–2	3–2–1
29	April 7	at Purdue	Alexander Field • West Lafayette, Indiana	5–6	15–12–2	3–3–1
30	April 8	at Purdue	Alexander Field • West Lafayette, Indiana	3–7	15–13–2	3–4–1
31	April 9	at Purdue	Alexander Field • West Lafayette, Indiana	14–9	16–13–2	4–4–1
32	April 11	at Indiana State	Bob Warn Field at Sycamore Stadium • Terre Haute, Indiana	2–0	17–13–2	4–4–1
33	April 14	Minnesota	Bart Kaufman Field • Bloomington, Indiana	0–11	17–14–2	4–5–1
34	April 15	Minnesota	Bart Kaufman Field • Bloomington, Indiana	13–12	18–14–2	5–5–1
35	April 16	Minnesota	Bart Kaufman Field • Bloomington, Indiana	4–0	19–14–2	6–5–1
36	April 19	Butler	Bart Kaufman Field • Bloomington, Indiana	5–7	19–15–2	6–5–1
37	April 21	Michigan	Ray Fisher Stadium • Ann Arbor, Michigan,	1–0	20–15–2	7–5–1
38	April 22	Michigan	Ray Fisher Stadium • Ann Arbor, Michigan	12–9	21–15–2	8–5–1
39	April 23	Michigan	Ray Fisher Stadium • Ann Arbor, Michigan	5–12	21–16–2	8–6–1
40	April 25	vs Ball State	Victory Field • Indianapolis, Indiana	4–3	22–16–2	8–6–1
41	April 28	Maryland	Bart Kaufman Field • Bloomington, Indiana	9–2	23–16–2	9–6–1
42	April 29	Maryland	Bart Kaufman Field • Bloomington, Indiana	2–9	23–17–2	9–7–1
43	April 30	Maryland	Bart Kaufman Field • Bloomington, Indiana	6–3	24–17–2	10–7–1

May

#	Date	Opponent	Venue	Score	Overall record	B1G Record
44	May 5	Xavier	Bart Kaufman Field • Bloomington, Indiana	1–0	25–17–2	10–7–1
45	May 6	Xavier	Bart Kaufman Field • Bloomington, Indiana	14–3	26–17–2	10–7–1
46	May 7	Xavier	Bart Kaufman Field • Bloomington, Indiana	11–7	27–17–2	10–7–1
47	May 9	at Kentucky	Cliff Hagan Stadium • Lexington, Kentucky,	2–5	27–18–2	10–7–1
48	May 12	Penn State	Bart Kaufman Field • Bloomington, Indiana	2–5	27–19–2	10–8–1
49	May 13	Penn State	Bart Kaufman Field • Bloomington, Indiana	5–2	28–19–2	11–8–1
50	May 14	Penn State	Bart Kaufman Field • Bloomington, Indiana	10–2	29–19–2	12–8–1
51	May 16	Louisville	Bart Kaufman Field • Bloomington, Indiana	4–3	30–19–2	12–8–1
52	May 18	at Ohio State	Bill Davis Stadium • Columbus, Ohio,	4–7	30–20–2	12–9–1
53	May 19	at Ohio State	Bill Davis Stadium • Columbus, Ohio	8–4	31–20–2	13–9–1
54	May 20	at Ohio State	Bill Davis Stadium • Columbus, Ohio	4–3	32–20–2	14–9–1

Post-season
B1G Tournament

#	Date	Opponent	Venue	Score	Overall record	B1G Record
55	May 24	Minnesota	Bart Kaufman Field • Bloomington, Indiana	4–5	32–21–2	14–9–1
56	May 25	Michigan	Bart Kaufman Field • Bloomington, Indiana	5–4^{(13)}	33–21–2	14–9–1
57	May 26	Minnesota	Bart Kaufman Field • Bloomington, Indiana	8–9	33–22–2	14–9–1

NCAA tournament

#	Date	Opponent	Venue	Score	Overall record	B1G Record
58	June 2	NC State	Cliff Hagan Stadium • Lexington, Kentucky,	6–7	33–23–2	14–9–1
59	June 3	Ohio	Cliff Hagan Stadium • Lexington, Kentucky,	11–2	34–23–2	14–9–1
60	June 4	Kentucky	Cliff Hagan Stadium • Lexington, Kentucky,	9–14	34–24–2	14–9–1

== Lexington Regional ==
Lexington Regional Teams
(1) Kentucky Wildcats	(2) Indiana Hoosiers	(3) NC State Wolfpack	(4) Ohio Bobcats

First round
1	Kentucky	6
4	Ohio	4
3	NC State	7
2	Indiana	6
Lower round 1
4	Ohio	2
2	Indiana	11

Regional semifinals
1	Kentucky	4
3	NC State	5
Lower final
1	Kentucky	14
2	Indiana	9

Regional finals
3	NC State	6	5
1	Kentucky	8	10

- Lexington Regional Scores Source

== Awards and honors ==
=== Regular season awards ===
Weekly Awards
Player	Award	Date awarded	Ref.
Jake Matheny	Big Ten Baseball Freshman of the Week	February 20, 2017	
Andrew Saalfrank	Big Ten Baseball Co-Freshman of the Week	March 13, 2017	
Alex Krupa	Big Ten Baseball Player of the Week	March 20, 2017	
Matt Lloyd	Collegiate Baseball National Player of the Week	March 27, 2017	
Matt Lloyd	Big Ten Player of the Week	March 27, 2017	
Matt Lloyd	National Collegiate Baseball Writers Association Hitter of the Week	March 28, 2017	
Matt Lloyd	Perfect Game's Player of the Week	March 28, 2017	
Cal Krueger	Big Ten Baseball Freshman of the Week	May 15, 2017	
Matt Lloyd	Mideast-ABCA/Rawlings All-Region Team	June 14, 2017	

=== Conference awards ===
Awards
Player	Award	Date awarded	Ref.
Matt Lloyd	Second team All-Big Ten	May 23, 2017	
Logan Sowers	Second team All-Big Ten	May 23, 2017	
Craig Dedelow	Third team All-Big Ten	May 23, 2017	
Pauly Milto	Third team All-Big Ten	May 23, 2017	
Matt Gorski	Freshman team All-Big Ten	May 23, 2017	
Jeremy Houston	Freshman team All-Big Ten	May 23, 2017	
Cal Krueger	Freshman team All-Big Ten	May 23, 2017	
Tony Butler	Indiana's Sportsmanship Award	May 23, 2017	

== See also ==
- 2017 Big Ten Conference baseball tournament
- 2017 NCAA Division I baseball tournament
