= 2016 Indiana Hoosiers baseball team =

American college baseball season

2016 Indiana Hoosiers baseball
- Conference: Big Ten Conference
- Record: 32–24 (15–9 B1G)
- Head coach: Chris Lemonis (2nd season)
- Pitching coach: Kyle Bunn (2nd season)
- Captains: Kyle Hart; Jake Kelzer; Brian Wilhite
- Home stadium: Bart Kaufman Field (Capacity: 2,500)

2016 Big Ten Conference baseball standings
| | Conf. | | | | | | Overall |
| Team | W | | L | | T | PCT | W | | L | | T | PCT |
|---|---|---|---|---|---|---|---|---|---|---|---|---|
| Minnesota ‍†‍‍^{y} | 16 | – | 7 | – | 0 | .696 | 35 | – | 21 | – | 0 | .625 |
| Nebraska ‍‍‍^{y} | 16 | – | 8 | – | 0 | .667 | 37 | – | 22 | – | 0 | .627 |
| Ohio St. ‍‍‡‍^{y} | 15 | – | 9 | – | 0 | .625 | 44 | – | 20 | – | 1 | .685 |
| Indiana ‍‍‍ | 15 | – | 9 | – | 0 | .625 | 32 | – | 24 | – | 0 | .571 |
| Michigan ‍‍‍ | 13 | – | 10 | – | 0 | .565 | 36 | – | 21 | – | 0 | .632 |
| Michigan State ‍‍‍ | 13 | – | 11 | – | 0 | .542 | 36 | – | 20 | – | 0 | .643 |
| Maryland ‍‍‍ | 13 | – | 11 | – | 0 | .542 | 30 | – | 27 | – | 0 | .526 |
| Illinois ‍‍‍ | 12 | – | 12 | – | 0 | .500 | 28 | – | 23 | – | 0 | .549 |
| Iowa ‍‍‍ | 12 | – | 12 | – | 0 | .500 | 30 | – | 26 | – | 0 | .536 |
| Penn State ‍‍‍ | 12 | – | 12 | – | 0 | .500 | 28 | – | 27 | – | 0 | .509 |
| Rutgers ‍‍‍ | 9 | – | 15 | – | 0 | .375 | 27 | – | 28 | – | 0 | .491 |
| Northwestern ‍‍‍ | 7 | – | 17 | – | 0 | .292 | 15 | – | 39 | – | 0 | .278 |
| Purdue ‍‍‍ | 2 | – | 22 | – | 0 | .083 | 10 | – | 44 | – | 0 | .185 |
† – Conference champion ‡ – Tournament champion y – Invited to the NCAA tournament As of June 5, 2016; Rankings from Collegiate Baseball

The 2016 Indiana Hoosiers baseball team represented Indiana University during the 2016 NCAA Division I baseball season. The Hoosiers played their home games at Bart Kaufman Field as a member of the Big Ten Conference. They were led by head coach Chris Lemonis, in his second year at Indiana. The Hoosiers finished the season 32–24 (4th overall) in the 2016 Big Ten Conference baseball standings.

== Previous season ==
In 2015, the Hoosiers finished 6th in the Big Ten Conference with a record of 35–24 overall and 12–10 in conference play. They qualified for the 2015 Big Ten Conference baseball tournament, and lost in the semifinals to Maryland. They qualified for the 2015 NCAA Division I baseball tournament and were placed in the Champaign Regional. The Hoosiers won their opening series against Radford, but lost to eventual College World Series runner up Vanderbilt in the second round of the regionals.

== Roster ==
2016 Indiana Hoosiers baseball team
Players
Coaches

| # | Pos. | Name | B/T | Height | Weight | Year | Previous school | Home town |
|---|---|---|---|---|---|---|---|---|
| 2 | OF | Alex Krupa | L/L | 5 ft 8 in (1.73 m) | 182 lb (83 kg) | Jr | Greenwood | Greenwood, Indiana |
| 4 | INF | Tony Butler | R/R | 6 ft 1 in (1.85 m) | 198 lb (90 kg) | Jr | Sun Prairie | Sun Prairie, Wisconsin |
| 6 | INF | Isaiah Pasteur | R/R | 6 ft 2 in (1.88 m) | 185 lb (84 kg) | So | Winters Mill High School | Westminster, Maryland |
| 8 | RHP | Evan Bell | /R | 6 ft 8 in (2.03 m) | 219 lb (99 kg) | Sr | Blue Valley High School | Stillwell, Kansas |
| 9 | LHP | Tim Herrin | L/L | 6 ft 5 in (1.96 m) | 212 lb (96 kg) | Fr | South Vigo | Terre Haute, Indiana |
| 11 | INF | Brian Wilhite | /R | 6 ft 3 in (1.91 m) | 204 lb (93 kg) | Sr | St. Viator High School | Barrington, Illinois |
| 12 | LHP | B.J. Sabol | L/L | 6 ft 1 in (1.85 m) | 195 lb (88 kg) | So | Lake Country Lutheran | Hartland, Wisconsin |
| 14 | LHP | Kyle Hart | /L | 6 ft 5 in (1.96 m) | 205 lb (93 kg) | Sr | Sycamore High School | Cincinnati, Ohio |
| 15 | RHP | Pauly Milto | R/R | 6 ft 3 in (1.91 m) | 240 lb (109 kg) | Fr | Roncalli | Greenwood, Indiana |
| 16 | C | Eric Hansen | R/R | 5 ft 9 in (1.75 m) | 182 lb (83 kg) | Fr | Marist | Homer Glen, Illinois |
| 18 | INF | Austin Cangelosi | R/R | 6 ft 1 in (1.85 m) | 204 lb (93 kg) | Jr | Carl Sandburg | Orland Park, Illinois |
| 23 | OF | Laren Eustace | L/L | 5 ft 9 in (1.75 m) | 175 lb (79 kg) | So | Batavia | Batavia, Illinois |
| 24 | LHP | Sullivan Stadler | /L | 6 ft 1 in (1.85 m) | 188 lb (85 kg) | Fr | Glenbrook South High School | Glenview, Illinois |
| 25 | RHP | Chandler Sedat | /R | 6 ft 0 in (1.83 m) | 188 lb (85 kg) | Fr | West Bloomfield High School | West Bloomfield, Michigan |
| 26 | OF | Chris Lowe | R/R | 6 ft 2 in (1.88 m) | 197 lb (89 kg) | So | Poway | Poway, California |
| 29 | C | Ryan Fineman | R/R | 6 ft 0 in (1.83 m) | 215 lb (98 kg) | Fr | Agoura | Westlake Village, California |
| 30 | INF | Scotty Bradley | L/R | 6 ft 2 in (1.88 m) | 221 lb (100 kg) | Fr | Hopewell Valley Central | Pennington, New Jersey |
| 32 | OF | Luke Miller | R/R | 6 ft 3 in (1.91 m) | 184 lb (83 kg) | Fr | Cowan High School | Muncie, Indiana |
| 33 | LHP | Austin Foote | L/L | 6 ft 3 in (1.91 m) | 179 lb (81 kg) | So | Lake Zurich | Lake Zurich, Illinois |
| 34 | RHP | Jonathan Stiever | R/R | 6 ft 1 in (1.85 m) | 188 lb (85 kg) | Fr | Cedarburg | Cedarburg, Wisconsin |
| 35 | LHP | Will Coursen-Carr | /L | 6 ft 4 in (1.93 m) | 220 lb (100 kg) | Sr | South Side | Fort Wayne, Indiana |
| 36 | INF | Colby Stratten | R/R | 6 ft 1 in (1.85 m) | 165 lb (75 kg) | So | Bloomington North | Bloomington, Indiana |
| 38 | OF | Kent Williams | L/R | 6 ft 3 in (1.91 m) | 202 lb (92 kg) | Jr | Noblesville High School | Noblesville, Indiana |
| 39 | OF | Craig Dedelow | L/R | 6 ft 4 in (1.93 m) | 194 lb (88 kg) | Jr | Munster | Munster, Indiana |
| 40 | RHP | Brian Hobbie | R/R | 6 ft 4 in (1.93 m) | 227 lb (103 kg) | So | Glenwood | Springfield, Illinois |
| 41 | C | Lukas Veinbergs | / | 6 ft 0 in (1.83 m) | 183 lb (83 kg) | Fr | Pinckney High School | Pinckney, Michigan |
| 42 | RHP | Thomas Belcher | /R | 6 ft 4 in (1.93 m) | 208 lb (94 kg) | Jr | Bolles School | Jacksonville, Florida |
| 43 | RHP | Luke Stephenson | R/R | 6 ft 2 in (1.88 m) | 195 lb (88 kg) | Jr | Triton Central | Indianapolis, Indiana |
| 44 | RHP | Jake Kelzer | /R | 6 ft 8 in (2.03 m) | 229 lb (104 kg) | Jr | Bloomington High School South | Bloomington, Indiana |
| 45 | LHP | Caleb Baragar | /L | 6 ft 3 in (1.91 m) | 205 lb (93 kg) | Fr | Jenison, Michigan |
| 51 | OF | Logan Sowers | R/R | 6 ft 4 in (1.93 m) | 220 lb (100 kg) | Jr | McCutcheon | Lafayette, Indiana |

Head coach

Chris Lemonis

Assistant coach(es)

Matt Reida

Pitching coach(es)

Kyle Bunn

Legend

- (C) Team captain
- (S) Suspended
- (I) Ineligible
- Injured
- Current redshirt

Roster
Last update: April 12, 2017

== Schedule ==
Legend
| Indiana win |
| Indiana loss |
| Postponement |

2016 Indiana Hoosiers baseball game log
Regular season
February

| # | Date | Opponent | Venue | Score | Overall record | B1G Record |
|---|---|---|---|---|---|---|
| 1 | February 19 | vs Middle Tennessee | Reese Smith Jr. Field • Murfreesboro, Tennessee, | 14–4 | 1–0 | – |
| 2 | February 20 | vs Middle Tennessee | Reese Smith Jr. Field • Murfreesboro, Tennessee | 2–3 | 1–1 | – |
| 3 | February 20 | vs Middle Tennessee | Reese Smith Jr. Field • Murfreesboro, Tennessee | 4–5 | 1–2 | – |
| 4 | February 26 | vs Cal State Fullerton | Goodwin Field • Fullerton, California | 3–8 | 1–3 | – |
| 5 | February 27 | at Cal State Fullerton | Goodwin Field • Fullerton, California | 2–3 | 1–4 | – |
| 6 | February 28 | at Cal State Fullerton | Goodwin Field • Fullerton, California | 1–6 | 1–5 | – |

March

| # | Date | Opponent | Venue | Score | Overall record | B1G Record |
|---|---|---|---|---|---|---|
| 7 | March 3 | vs Seton Hall | Charlotte Sports Park • Port Charlotte, Florida, | 2–7 | 1–6 | – |
| 8 | March 4 | vs Illinois State | Charlotte Sports Park • Port Charlotte, Florida | 14–1 | 2–6 | – |
| 9 | March 5 | vs Seton Hall | Charlotte Sports Park • Port Charlotte, Florida | 4–6 | 2–7 | – |
| 10 | March 6 | vs Butler | Charlotte Sports Park • Port Charlotte, Florida | 2–1 | 3–7 | – |
| 11 | March 11 | Western Carolina | Bart Kaufman Field • Bloomington, Indiana | 3–2 | 4–7 | – |
| 12 | March 12 | Western Carolina | Bart Kaufman Field • Bloomington, Indiana | 1–4 | 4–8 | – |
| 13 | March 12 | Western Carolina | Bart Kaufman Field • Bloomington, Indiana | 9–1 | 5–8 | – |
| 14 | March 15 | Evansville | Charles H. Braun Stadium • Evansville, Indiana | 7–6 | 6–8 | – |
| 15 | March 18 | Toledo | Bart Kaufman Field • Bloomington, Indiana | 9–6 | 7–8 | – |
| 16 | March 19 | Toledo | Bart Kaufman Field • Bloomington, Indiana | 1–3 | 7–9 | – |
| 17 | March 20 | Toledo | Bart Kaufman Field • Bloomington, Indiana | 8–0 | 8–9 | – |
| 18 | March 20 | Toledo | Bart Kaufman Field • Bloomington, Indiana | 5–1 | 9–9 | – |
| 19 | March 23 | Butler | Bart Kaufman Field • Bloomington, Indiana | 27–1 | 10–9 | – |
| 20 | March 25 | at Indiana State | Bob Warn Field at Sycamore Stadium • Terre Haute, Indiana | 7–5 | 11–9 | – |
| 21 | March 26 | Indiana State | Bart Kaufman Field • Bloomington, Indiana | 1–5 | 11–10 | – |
| 22 | March 27 | Indiana State | Bart Kaufman Field • Bloomington, Indiana | 5–3 | 12–10 | – |
| 23 | March 29 | Cincinnati | Bart Kaufman Field • Bloomington, Indiana | 0–5 | 12–11 | – |
| 24 | March 30 | Evansville | Bart Kaufman Field • Bloomington, Indiana | Cancelled | 12–11 | – |

April

| # | Date | Opponent | Venue | Score | Overall record | B1G Record |
|---|---|---|---|---|---|---|
| 25 | April 1 | at Rutgers | Bainton Field • Piscataway, New Jersey, | 1–7 | 12–12 | 0–1 |
| 26 | April 2 | at Rutgers | Bainton Field • Piscataway, New Jersey | 2–3 | 12–13 | 0–2 |
| 27 | April 2 | at Rutgers | Bainton Field • Piscataway, New Jersey | 9–2 | 13–13 | 1–2 |
| 28 | April 6 | at Cincinnati | Marge Schott Stadium • Cincinnati, Ohio, | 7–3 | 14–13 | 1–2 |
| 29 | April 8 | Purdue | Bart Kaufman Field • Bloomington, Indiana | 10–9 | 15–13 | 2–2 |
| 30 | April 9 | Purdue | Bart Kaufman Field • Bloomington, Indiana | 3–2 | 16–13 | 3–2 |
| 31 | April 10 | Purdue | Bart Kaufman Field • Bloomington, Indiana | 7–6 | 17–13 | 4–2 |
| 32 | April 13 | Ball State | Bart Kaufman Field • Bloomington, Indiana | 4–3 | 18–13 | 4–2 |
| 33 | April 15 | Iowa | Bart Kaufman Field • Bloomington, Indiana | 7–1 | 19–13 | 5–2 |
| 34 | April 16 | Iowa | Bart Kaufman Field • Bloomington, Indiana | 8–2 | 20–13 | 6–2 |
| 35 | April 17 | Iowa | Bart Kaufman Field • Bloomington, Indiana | 5–6 | 20–14 | 6–3 |
| 36 | April 20 | Xavier | J. Page Hayden Field • Cincinnati, Ohio, | 8–0 | 21–14 | 6–3 |
| 37 | April 22 | at Michigan State | Drayton McLane Baseball Stadium at John H. Kobs Field • East Lansing, Michigan, | 3–2 | 22–14 | 7–3 |
| 38 | April 23 | at Michigan State | Drayton McLane Baseball Stadium at John H. Kobs Field • East Lansing, Michigan | 0–9 | 22–15 | 7–4 |
| 39 | April 24 | at Michigan State | Drayton McLane Baseball Stadium at John H. Kobs Field • East Lansing, Michigan | 8–4 | 23–15 | 8–4 |
| 40 | April 26 | vs Notre Dame | Victory Field • Indianapolis, Indiana | 0–5 | 23–16 | 8–4 |
| 41 | April 27 | Xavier | Bart Kaufman Field • Bloomington, Indiana | Cancelled | 23–16 | 8–4 |
| 42 | April 29 | Northwestern | Bart Kaufman Field • Bloomington, Indiana | 2–1 | 24–16 | 9–4 |
| 43 | April 29 | Northwestern | Bart Kaufman Field • Bloomington, Indiana | 4–3 | 25–16 | 10–4 |

May

| # | Date | Opponent | Venue | Score | Overall record | B1G Record |
|---|---|---|---|---|---|---|
| 44 | May 1 | Northwestern | Bart Kaufman Field • Bloomington, Indiana | 7–6 | 26–16 | 11–4 |
| 45 | May 6 | at Minnesota | Siebert Field • Minneapolis, Minnesota, | 12–8 | 27–16 | 12–4 |
| 46 | May 7 | at Minnesota | Siebert Field • Minneapolis, Minnesota | 6–8 | 27–17 | 12–5 |
| 47 | May 8 | at Minnesota | Siebert Field • Minneapolis, Minnesota | 3–2 | 28–17 | 13–5 |
| 48 | May 10 | Kentucky | Bart Kaufman Field • Bloomington, Indiana | 3–2 | 29–17 | 13–5 |
| 49 | May 13 | Illinois | Bart Kaufman Field • Bloomington, Indiana | 1–2 | 29–18 | 13–6 |
| 50 | May 14 | Illinois | Bart Kaufman Field • Bloomington, Indiana | 3–1 | 30–18 | 14–6 |
| 51 | May 15 | Illinois | Bart Kaufman Field • Bloomington, Indiana | 4–1 | 31–18 | 15–6 |
| 52 | May 17 | at Louisville | Jim Patterson Stadium • Louisville, Kentucky, | 2–9 | 31–19 | 15–6 |
| 53 | May 19 | at Nebraska | Haymarket Park • Lincoln, Nebraska, | 1–4 | 31–20 | 15–7 |
| 54 | May 20 | at Nebraska | Haymarket Park • Lincoln, Nebraska | 0–2 | 31–21 | 15–8 |
| 55 | May 21 | at Nebraska | Haymarket Park • Lincoln, Nebraska | 0–3 | 31–22 | 15–9 |

Postseason
B1G Tournament

| # | Date | Opponent | Venue | Score | Overall record | B1G Record |
|---|---|---|---|---|---|---|
| 56 | May 25 | vs Maryland | TD Ameritrade Park Omaha • Omaha, Nebraska, | 3–5 | 31–23 | – |
| 57 | May 26 | vs Nebraska | TD Ameritrade Park Omaha • Omaha, Nebraska | 6–2 | 32–23 | – |
| 58 | May 27 | vs Maryland | TD Ameritrade Park Omaha • Omaha, Nebraska | 0–3 | 32–24 | – |

== Awards and honors ==
=== Big Ten Players of the Week ===
Weekly Awards
| Player | Award | Date awarded | Ref. |
|---|---|---|---|
| Kyle Hart | Big Ten Baseball Co-Pitcher of the Week | March 7, 2016 | |
| Caleb Baragar | Big Ten Baseball Co-Pitcher of the Week | March 21, 2016 | |
| Brian Wilhite | Big Ten Player of the Week | March 28, 2016 | |
| Kyle Hart | Big Ten Pitcher of the Week | April 18, 2016 | |

=== Award Watch List ===
| Player | Award | Date awarded | Ref. |
|---|---|---|---|
| Jake Kelzer | NCBWA Stopper of the Year Watch List | February 15, 2016 | |
| Ryan Fineman | Johnny Bench Award Watch List | May 3, 2016 | |

=== Awards ===
| Player | Award | Date awarded | Ref. |
|---|---|---|---|
| Kyle Hart | First Team All-Big Ten | May 24, 2016 | |
| Brian Wilhite | Third Team All-Big Ten | May 24, 2016 | |
| Scotty Bradley | Freshman All-Big Ten | May 24, 2016 | |
| Ryan Fineman | Freshman All-Big Ten | May 24, 2016 | |
| Luke Miller | Freshman All-Big Ten | May 24, 2016 | |
| Austin Cangelosi | Big Ten Sportsmanship Award | May 24, 2016 | |
| Luke Miller | Louisville Slugger Freshman All-American | June 8, 2016 | |
| Tony Butler | ABCA/Rawlings Gold Glove Team | June 19, 2016 | |

== MLB draft ==
Four players were selected in the 2016 MLB draft.

| Round | Overall Pick | Name | Position | Team |
|---|---|---|---|---|
| 9th | 275 | Caleb Baragar | LHP | San Francisco Giants |
| 18th | 527 | Jake Kelzer | RHP | Philadelphia Phillies |
| 19th | 568 | Kyle Hart | LHP | Boston Red Sox |
| 34th | 1,035 | Craig Dedelow | OF | Pittsburgh Pirates |

- Craig Dedelow declined to sign with the Pirates and returned to Indiana for his senior year.
