= 2017 Purdue Boilermakers baseball team =

American college baseball season

2017 Purdue Boilermakers baseball

Big Ten Conference Tournament, L, Maryland 2-5
- Conference: Big Ten Conference
- Record: 29–27 (12–12 Big Ten)
- Head coach: Mark Wasikowski (1st season)
- Assistant coach: Jack Marder (1st season)
- Hitting coach: Wally Crancer (4th season)
- Pitching coach: Steve Holm (1st season)
- Home stadium: Alexander Field

2017 Big Ten Conference baseball standings
| | Conf. | | | | | | Overall |
| Team | W | | L | | T | PCT | W | | L | | T | PCT |
|---|---|---|---|---|---|---|---|---|---|---|---|---|
| Nebraska ‍†‍‍^{y} | 16 | – | 7 | – | 1 | .688 | 35 | – | 22 | – | 1 | .612 |
| Michigan ‍‍‍^{y} | 16 | – | 8 | – | 0 | .667 | 42 | – | 17 | – | 0 | .712 |
| Minnesota ‍‍‍ | 15 | – | 8 | – | 0 | .652 | 36 | – | 21 | – | 0 | .632 |
| Iowa ‍‍‡‍^{y} | 15 | – | 9 | – | 0 | .625 | 39 | – | 22 | – | 0 | .639 |
| Maryland ‍‍‍^{y} | 15 | – | 9 | – | 0 | .625 | 38 | – | 23 | – | 0 | .623 |
| Indiana ‍‍‍^{y} | 14 | – | 9 | – | 1 | .604 | 34 | – | 24 | – | 2 | .583 |
| Northwestern ‍‍‍ | 13 | – | 11 | – | 0 | .542 | 27 | – | 30 | – | 0 | .474 |
| Purdue ‍‍‍ | 12 | – | 12 | – | 0 | .500 | 29 | – | 27 | – | 0 | .518 |
| Michigan State ‍‍‍ | 10 | – | 14 | – | 0 | .417 | 29 | – | 23 | – | 0 | .558 |
| Illinois ‍‍‍ | 9 | – | 15 | – | 0 | .375 | 23 | – | 28 | – | 0 | .451 |
| Ohio State ‍‍‍ | 8 | – | 16 | – | 0 | .333 | 22 | – | 34 | – | 0 | .393 |
| Rutgers ‍‍‍ | 7 | – | 16 | – | 0 | .304 | 19 | – | 34 | – | 0 | .358 |
| Penn State ‍‍‍ | 4 | – | 20 | – | 0 | .167 | 18 | – | 37 | – | 0 | .327 |
† – Conference champion ‡ – Tournament champion y – Invited to the NCAA tournament Rankings from Collegiate Baseball

The 2017 Purdue Boilermakers baseball team were a baseball team that represented Purdue University in the 2017 NCAA Division I baseball season. The Boilermakers were members of the Big Ten Conference and played their home games at Alexander Field in West Lafayette, Indiana. They were led by first-year head coach Mark Wasikowski. The Boilermakers finished the regular season 29–27 overall and 12–12 in conference play.

== Previous season ==
In 2016, Purdue compiled a 10–44 record (2–22 in conference play) during the regular season, failing to qualify for a postseason for the fourth straight season. On May 21, 2016 Doug Schreiber announced he would be resigning at the end of the season.

On June 24, 2016, Purdue hired Wasikowski to be the head coach of the baseball team. Wasikowski had been an assistant coach at Oregon the previous five seasons. After retaining Wally Crancer, Wasikowski hired Jack Marder as a volunteer assistant. On June 15, 2016, Wasikowski completed his staff with the hiring of Steve Holm as his pitching coach.

== Preseason ==
=== MLB draft ===
The following Boilermakers on the 2016 roster were selected in the 2016 Major League Baseball draft:

List of Drafted Players
| Name | 2016 Class | Pos. | Team | Round | Signed/Returned |
|---|---|---|---|---|---|
| Matt Frawley | Junior | RHP | Pittsburgh Pirates | 17th | Signed |

* indicates draftee had no more college eligibility

== Roster ==
2017 Purdue Boilermakers baseball team
Players
Coaches

| # | Pos. | Name | B/T | Height | Weight | Year | Previous school | Home town |
|---|---|---|---|---|---|---|---|---|
| 1 | INF | Logan Poisall | R/R | 5 ft 11 in (1.8 m) | 188 lb (85 kg) | RS Jr | Fresno City College | Clovis, California |
| 3 | INF | Mike Madej | S/R | 5 ft 10 in (1.78 m) | 172 lb (78 kg) | Fr | Providence H. S. | Manhattan, Illinois |
| 4 | | Skyler Hunter | S/R | 5 ft 10 in (1.78 m) | 185 lb (84 kg) | Fr | Hood River Valley H. S. | Hood River, Oregon |
| 5 | INF | Harry Shipley | L/R | 5 ft 9 in (1.75 m) | 165 lb (75 kg) | Jr | Cathedral H. S. | Fishers, Indiana |
| 6 | INF | Evan Warden | R/R | 5 ft 10 in (1.78 m) | 165 lb (75 kg) | RS So | Western H. S. | Kokomo, Indiana |
| 8 | | Drew Bertram | R/R | 6 ft 1 in (1.85 m) | 190 lb (86 kg) | Fr | Zionsville Community H. S. | Zionsville, Indiana |
| 9 | C | Nick Dalesandro | R/R | 6 ft 1 in (1.85 m) | 175 lb (79 kg) | So | Joliet Catholic Academy | Plainfield, Illinois |
| 10 | INF | Hayden Grant | R/R | 6 ft 2 in (1.88 m) | 190 lb (86 kg) | Sr | Cathedral Catholic H. S. | Solana Beach, California |
| 11 | OF | Alec Olund | R/R | 6 ft 1.5 in (1.87 m) | 186 lb (84 kg) | Jr | Lake Central H. S. | Crown Point, Indiana |
| 13 | RHP | Tanner Andrews | R/R | 6 ft 3 in (1.91 m) | 207 lb (94 kg) | Jr | Tippecanoe Valley H. S. | Rochester, Indiana |
| 15 | INF | Evan Kennedy | L/R | 6 ft 2.5 in (1.89 m) | 213 lb (97 kg) | Jr | Lafayette Central Catholics Jr/Sr H. S. | Lafayette, Indiana |
| 17 | INF | Stephen Kalina | L/R | 5 ft 10 in (1.78 m) | 177 lb (80 kg) | RS So | Edina H. S. | Edina, Minnesota |
| 21 | RHP | Mike Kornacker | R/R | 6 ft 3.5 in (1.92 m) | 213 lb (97 kg) | RS So | St. Laurence H. S. | Lemont, Illinois |
| 22 | C | Bryce Bonner | R/R | 5 ft 9 in (1.75 m) | 187 lb (85 kg) | Fr | Jesuit College Preparatory School of Dallas | Katy, Texas |
| 23 | RHP | Jack Dellinger | R/R | 6 ft 6 in (1.98 m) | 212 lb (96 kg) | Fr | Issaquah H. S. | Issaquah, Washington |
| 25 | OF | Milo Beam | L/L | 6 ft 3 in (1.91 m) | 170 lb (77 kg) | Fr | Westfield H. S. | Westfield, Indiana |
| 26 | LHP | Ross Learnard | R/L | 6 ft 2 in (1.88 m) | 180 lb (82 kg) | Jr | Parkland College | Catlin, Illinois |
| 27 | C | Jacson McGowan | R/R | 6 ft 2.5 in (1.89 m) | 212 lb (96 kg) | So | Brownsburg H. S. | Brownsburg, Indiana |
| 28 | LHP | Nick Wojtysiak | L/L | 5 ft 11 in (1.8 m) | 196 lb (89 kg) | Jr | Paradise Valley Community College | Fountain Hills, Arizona |
| 29 | OF | John LeGare | R/R | 6 ft 2 in (1.88 m) | 177 lb (80 kg) | Fr | St. Charles North H. S. | St. Charles, Illinois |
| 31 | RHP | Cameron Williams | R/R | 6 ft 7 in (2.01 m) | 221 lb (100 kg) | Jr | Angelina College | Seabrook, Texas |
| 32 | LHP | Gareth Stroh | L/L | 6 ft 1 in (1.85 m) | 200 lb (91 kg) | So | Coffeyville Community College | Kearney, Nebraska |
| 33 | INF | Brice McDaniel | L/L | 6 ft 2 in (1.88 m) | 228 lb (103 kg) | Fr | Columbus North H. S. | Columbus, Indiana |
| 34 | RHP | Andrew Bohm | R/R | 6 ft 1.5 in (1.87 m) | 227 lb (103 kg) | Fr | Hamilton Southeastern H. S. | Fishers, Indiana |
| 36 | OF | Ted Snidanko | R/R | 6 ft 4 in (1.93 m) | 199 lb (90 kg) | Sr | Lockport Township H. S. | Homer Glen, Illinois |
| 37 | RHP | Alex Lyons | R/R | 6 ft 4 in (1.93 m) | 210 lb (95 kg) | Sr | Vincennes University | Richmond, Indiana |
| 39 | RHP | Brian Ghiselli | R/R | 6 ft 3 in (1.91 m) | 226 lb (103 kg) | RS Sr | West Lafayette Junior-Senior H. S. | West Lafayette, Indiana |
| 40 | RHP | Dalton Parker | R/R | 6 ft 4 in (1.93 m) | 216 lb (98 kg) | Fr | St. Joseph-Ogden H. S. | St. Joseph, Illinois |
| 41 | LHP | Kyle Van Hoeck | L/L | 6 ft 3 in (1.91 m) | 180 lb (82 kg) | Jr | St. Benedict at Auburndale | Memphis, Tennessee |
| 42 | LHP | Matt Moore | L/L | 6 ft 3 in (1.91 m) | 219 lb (99 kg) | Fr | Avon H. S. | Avon, Indiana |
| 43 | RHP | Tanner Schumacher | R/R | 6 ft 5.5 in (1.97 m) | 227 lb (103 kg) | RS Sr | Wabash Valley College | Blaine, Minnesota |
| 45 | RHP | Adam Dressler | R/R | 6 ft 0 in (1.83 m) | 194 lb (88 kg) | Sr | Hinsdale Central H. S. | Clarendon Hills, Illinois |
| 46 | RHP | Kyle Schweiger | R/R | 6 ft 0.5 in (1.84 m) | 210 lb (95 kg) | RS Jr | Chipola College | Rochester, Michigan |
| 47 | LHP | Hunter Wolfe | L/L | 6 ft 1 in (1.85 m) | 172 lb (78 kg) | Fr | Clay City H. S. | Clay City, Indiana |

Head coach

44 Mark Wasikowski

Assistant coach(es)

Miles Miller

Hitting coach(es)

7 Wally Crancer

Pitching coach(es)

20 Steve Holm

Legend

- (C) Team captain
- (S) Suspended
- (I) Ineligible
- Injured
- Current redshirt

Roster
Last update: February 20, 2017

== Schedule ==
2017 Purdue Boilermakers baseball game log
Regular season
February

| # | Date | Opponent | Site/stadium | Score | Win | Loss | Save | Attendance | Overall record | B1G record |
|---|---|---|---|---|---|---|---|---|---|---|
| 1 | February 17 | Texas State | Bobcat Ballpark • San Marcos, Texas | 9–3 | Andrews (1–0) | Reich (0–1) | None | 2,068 | 1–0 | – |
| 2 | February 18 | Texas State | Bobcat Ballpark • San Marcos, Texas | 12–8 | Parker (1–0) | Lews (0–1) | None | 1,702 | 2–0 | – |
| 3 | February 18 | Texas State | Bobcat Ballpark • San Marcos, Texas | 11–13 | B. Walden (1–0) | Schumacher (0–1) | None | 1,702 | 2–1 | – |
| 4 | February 19 | Texas State | Bobcat Ballpark • San Marcos, Texas | 5–14 | Engle (1–0) | Dellinger (0–1) | None | 1,253 | 2–2 | – |
| 5 | February 24 | Little Rock | Gary Hogan Field • Little Rock, Arkansas | 6–4 | Andrews (2–0) | McDowell (0–2) | Parker (1) | 324 | 3–2 | – |
| 6 | February 25 | Little Rock | Gary Hogan Field • Little Rock, Arkansas | 0–2 | Malcom (1–0) | Stroh (0–1) | Corbett (1) | 389 | 3–3 | – |
| 7 | February 26 | Little Rock | Gary Hogan Field • Little Rock, Arkansas | 0–13 | Fidel (1–1) | Schumacher (0–2) | None | 263 | 3–4 | – |

March

| # | Date | Opponent | Site/stadium | Score | Win | Loss | Save | Attendance | Overall record | B1G record |
|---|---|---|---|---|---|---|---|---|---|---|
| 8 | March 3 | Southeast Missouri State | Capaha Field • Cape Girardeau, Missouri | 4–0 | Andrews (3–0) | Chander (2–1) | None | 568 | 4–4 | – |
| 9 | March 4 | Southeast Missouri State | Capaha Field • Cape Girardeau, Missouri | 13–5 | Stroh (1–1) | Losman (0–1) | Parker (2) | 2,216 | 5–4 | – |
| 10 | March 5 | Southeast Missouri State | Capaha Field • Cape Girardeau, Missouri | 7–17 | Murphy (2–0) | Schumacher (0–2) | None | 314 | 5–5 | – |
| 11 | March 10 | Cal State Northridge | Matador Field • Northridge, California | 8–16 | Weston (3–1) | Andrews (3–1) | None | 260 | 5–6 | – |
| 12 | March 11 | Cal State Northridge | Matador Field • Northridge, California | 1–4 | Myers (2–1) | Stroh (1–2) | None | 284 | 5–7 | – |
| 13 | March 12 | Cal State Northridge | Matador Field • Northridge, California | 4–5 | Vanderford (3–1) | Parker (1–1) | O'Neil (3) | 261 | 5–8 | – |
| 14 | March 13 | Cal State Northridge | Matador Field • Northridge, California | 9–3 | Schweiger (1–0) | Nicol (0–1) | None | 153 | 6–8 | – |
| 15 | March 16 | Santa Clara | Stephen Schott Stadium • Santa Clara, California | 12–4 | Learnard (1–0) | Steffens (1–3) | None | 111 | 7–8 | – |
| 16 | March 17 | Santa Clara | Stephen Schott Stadium • Santa Clara, California | 3–0 | Andrews (4–1) | Lex (1–4) | Parker (3) | 123 | 8–8 | – |
| 17 | March 18 | Santa Clara | Stephen Schott Stadium • Santa Clara, California | 8–7 | Williams (1–0) | Buckley (0–1) | Parker (4) | 2017 | 9–8 | – |
| 18 | March 18 | Santa Clara | Stephen Schott Stadium • Santa Clara, California | 10–5 | McGowan (1–0) | Spagnuolo (1–2) | None | 207 | 10–8 | – |
| 19 | March 22 | Ball State | Ball Diamond • Muncie, Indiana | 16–4 | Dellinger (1–1) | Harmon (0–1) | None | 184 | 11–8 | – |
| 20 | March 24 | Iowa | Duane Banks Field • Iowa City, Iowa | 2–0 | Parker (2–1) | Robison (1–2) | Williams (1) | 490 | 12–8 | 1–0 |
| 21 | March 25 | Iowa | Duane Banks Field • Iowa City, Iowa | 1–5 | Daniels (4–1) | Williams (1–1) | Ritter (2) | 436 | 12–9 | 1–1 |
| 22 | March 26 | Iowa | Duane Banks Field • Iowa City, Iowa | 2–7 | Shimp (2–1) | Wojtysiak (0–1) | None | 507 | 12–10 | 1–2 |
| 23 | March 28 | Kent State | Alexander Field • West Lafayette, Indiana | 3–2 | Learnard (2–0) | Spangler (0–1) | None | 646 | 13–10 | 1–2 |
| 24 | March 29 | Valparaiso | Alexander Field • West Lafayette, Indiana | 1–5 | Inman (3–2) | Schumacher (0–3) | None | 1,055 | 13–11 | 1–2 |
| 25 | March 31 | Ohio State | Bill Davis Stadium • Columbus, Ohio | 2–13 | Pavlopoulos (2–2) | Andrews (4–2) | None | 661 | 13–12 | 1–3 |

April

| # | Date | Opponent | Site/stadium | Score | Win | Loss | Save | Attendance | Overall record | B1G record |
|---|---|---|---|---|---|---|---|---|---|---|
| 26 | April 1 | Ohio State | Bill Davis Stadium • Columbus, Ohio | 6–1 | Stroh (2–2) | Feltner (0–5) | Learnard (1) | 683 | 14–12 | 2–3 |
| 27 | April 2 | Ohio State | Bill Davis Stadium • Columbus, Ohio | 2–1 | Kornacker (1–0) | Post (1–2) | Williams (2) | 1,067 | 15–12 | 3–3 |
| 28 | April 4 | Indiana State | Alexander Field • West Lafayette, Indiana | 2–5 | Polly (2–1) | Dellinger (1–2) | Conway (5) | 734 | 15–13 | 3–3 |
| 29 | April 7 | Indiana | Alexander Field • West Lafayette, Indiana | 6–5 | Schweiger (2–0) | Lloyd (2–1) | Learnard (2) | 1,299 | 16–13 | 4–3 |
| 30 | April 8 | Indiana | Alexander Field • West Lafayette, Indiana | 7–3 | Stroh (3–2) | Hobbie (2–3) | Williams (3) | 2,312 | 17–13 | 5–3 |
| 31 | April 9 | Indiana | Alexander Field • West Lafayette, Indiana | 9–14 | Milto (2–2) | Kornacker (1–1) | None | 2,035 | 17–14 | 5–4 |
| 32 | April 11 | #2 Louisville | Jim Patterson Stadium • Louisville, Kentucky | 2–13 | Hummel (4–0) | Dellinger (1–3) | None | 1,579 | 17–15 | 5–4 |
| 33 | April 14 | Rutgers | Bainton Field • Piscataway, New Jersey | 7–6 | Andrews (5–2) | Rosa (3–3) | Learnard (3) | 373 | 18–15 | 6–4 |
| 34 | April 15 | Rutgers | Bainton Field • Piscataway, New Jersey | 6–7 | Brito (2–6) | Stroh (3–3) | Herrmann (5) | 427 | 18–16 | 6–5 |
| 35 | April 16 | Rutgers | Bainton Field • Piscataway, New Jersey | 2–8 | O'Rielly (3–5) | Kornacker (1–2) | None | 267 | 18–17 | 6–6 |
| 36 | April 18 | Ball State | Alexander Field • West Lafayette, Indiana | 3–5 | Floyd (1–0) | Williams (1–2) | None | 969 | 18–18 | 6–6 |
| 37 | April 19 | Indiana State | Sycamore Stadium • Terre Haute, Indiana | 10–7 | Schumacher (1–3) | Larrison (1–2) | Stroh (1) | 898 | 19–18 | 6–6 |
| 38 | April 21 | Illinois | Alexander Field • West Lafayette, Indiana | 4–2 | Andrews (6–2) | Weber (2–4) | Parker (5) | 935 | 20–18 | 7–6 |
| 39 | April 22 | Illinois | Alexander Field • West Lafayette, Indiana | 4–1 | Stroh (1–3) | Watson (1–4) | None | 1,153 | 21–18 | 8–6 |
| 40 | April 23 | Illinois | Alexander Field • West Lafayette, Indiana | 2–1 | Leonard (3–0) | Thompson (2–2) | None | 1,010 | 22–18 | 9–6 |
| 41 | April 25 | Fort Wayne | Alexander Field • West Lafayette, Indiana | 18–0 | Dellinger (2–3) | Helm (2–2) | None | 811 | 23–18 | 9–6 |
| 42 | April 28 | Saint Louis | Alexander Field • West Lafayette, Indiana | 5–2 | Andrews (7–2) | Hogan (7–1) | Parker (6) | 575 | 24–18 | 9–6 |
| 43 | April 29 | Saint Louis | Alexander Field • West Lafayette, Indiana | 4–3 | Learnard (4–0) | Lefner (0–4) | None | 559 | 25–18 | 9–6 |
| 44 | April 30 | Saint Louis | Alexander Field • West Lafayette, Indiana | Cancelled | – | – | – | – | 25–18 | 9–6 |

May

| # | Date | Opponent | Site/stadium | Score | Win | Loss | Save | Attendance | Overall record | B1G record |
|---|---|---|---|---|---|---|---|---|---|---|
| 45 | May 5 | Northwestern | Alexander Field • West Lafayette, Indiana | 2–7 | Wetherbee (2–2) | Andrews (7–3) | Hofman (2) | 884 | 25–19 | 9–7 |
| 46 | May 6 | Northwestern | Alexander Field • West Lafayette, Indiana | 2–1 | Learnard (5–0) | Lawrence (3–3) | None | 1,078 | 26–19 | 10–7 |
| 47 | May 7 | Northwestern | Alexander Field • West Lafayette, Indiana | 7–8 | Lass (2–0) | Dellinger (2–4) | Hofman (3) | 1,133 | 26–20 | 10–8 |
| 48 | May 9 | Valparaiso | Emory G. Bauer Field • Valparaiso, Indiana | Cancelled | – | – | – | – | 26–20 | 10–8 |
| 49 | May 10 | Butler | Alexander Field • West Lafayette, Indiana | 2–4 | Hubbe (1–0) | Ghiselli (0–1) | Dattolo (4) | 833 | 26–21 | 10–8 |
| 50 | May 12 | #16 Michigan | Alexander Field • West Lafayette, Indiana | 0–2 | Jaskie (7–2) | Andrews (7–4) | Lamb (11) | 1,144 | 26–22 | 10–9 |
| 51 | May 13 | #16 Michigan | Alexander Field • West Lafayette, Indiana | 4–9 | Nutof (6–2) | Stroh (4–4) | None | 1,427 | 26–23 | 10–10 |
| 52 | May 14 | #16 Michigan | Alexander Field • West Lafayette, Indiana | 1–5 | Hendrickson (6–2) | Schumacher (1–4) | None | 1,002 | 26–24 | 10–11 |
| 53 | May 16 | Fort Wayne | Kokomo Municipal Stadium • Kokomo, Indiana | 9–7 | Learnard (6–0) | Boyd (0–9) | None | 200 | 27–24 | 10–11 |
| 54 | May 18 | Minnesota | Siebert Field • Minneapolis, Minnesota | 5–2 | Andrews (8–4) | Gilbreath (5–2) | Learnard (4) | 330 | 28–24 | 11–11 |
| 55 | May 19 | Minnesota | Siebert Field • Minneapolis, Minnesota | 11–1 | Stroh (5–4) | Schulze (4–3) | None | – | 29–24 | 12–11 |
| 56 | May 19 | Minnesota | Siebert Field • Minneapolis, Minnesota | 2–9 | Meyer (4–1) | Parker (2–2) | None | 496 | 29–25 | 12–12 |

Postseason
B1G Tournament

| # | Date | Opponent | Site/stadium | Score | Win | Loss | Save | Attendance | Overall record | B1G record |
|---|---|---|---|---|---|---|---|---|---|---|
| 57 | May 24 | #23 Nebraska | Bart Kaufman Field • Bloomington, Indiana | 9–15 | Hohensee 7–4 | Schumacher (1–5) | Palkert (2) | 1,163 | 29–26 | 12–12 |
| 58 | May 25 | Maryland | Bart Kaufman Field • Bloomington, Indiana | 2–5 | Murphy (1–0) | Parker (2–3) | Selmer (8) | 1,467 | 29–27 | 12–12 |

== Awards and honors ==
=== Weekly awards ===
Weekly Awards
| Player | Award | Date Awarded | Ref. |
|---|---|---|---|
| Tanner Andrews | Big Ten Pitcher of the Week | February 20, 2017 | |
| Tanner Andrews | Big Ten Pitcher of the Week | March 6, 2017 | |
| Skyler Hunter | Big Ten Co-Freshman of the Week | March 20, 2017 | |
| Gareth Stroh | Big Ten Pitcher of the Week | April 24, 2017 | |

=== Conference awards ===
Awards
| Player | Award | Date Awarded | Ref. |
|---|---|---|---|
| Gareth Stroh | Third team All-Big Ten | May 23, 2017 | |
| Bryce Bonner | Freshman team All-Big Ten | May 23, 2017 | |
| Skyler Hunter | Freshman team All-Big Ten | May 23, 2017 | |
| Bryce Bonner | Purdue's Sportsmanship Award | May 23, 2017 | |
