= 2017 Big Ten baseball tournament =

2017 athletic competition

2017 Big Ten Conference baseball tournament
- Teams: 8
- Format: Double-elimination
- Finals site: Bart Kaufman Field; Bloomington, Indiana
- Champions: Iowa Hawkeyes (1st title)
- Winning coach: Rick Heller (1st title)
- MVP: Chris Whelan (Iowa)
- Television: BTN

2017 Big Ten Conference baseball standings
	Conf.						Overall
Team	W		L		T	PCT	W		L		T	PCT
Nebraska ‍†‍‍^{y}	16	–	7	–	1	.688	35	–	22	–	1	.612
Michigan ‍‍‍^{y}	16	–	8	–	0	.667	42	–	17	–	0	.712
Minnesota ‍‍‍	15	–	8	–	0	.652	36	–	21	–	0	.632
Iowa ‍‍‡‍^{y}	15	–	9	–	0	.625	39	–	22	–	0	.639
Maryland ‍‍‍^{y}	15	–	9	–	0	.625	38	–	23	–	0	.623
Indiana ‍‍‍^{y}	14	–	9	–	1	.604	34	–	24	–	2	.583
Northwestern ‍‍‍	13	–	11	–	0	.542	27	–	30	–	0	.474
Purdue ‍‍‍	12	–	12	–	0	.500	29	–	27	–	0	.518
Michigan State ‍‍‍	10	–	14	–	0	.417	29	–	23	–	0	.558
Illinois ‍‍‍	9	–	15	–	0	.375	23	–	28	–	0	.451
Ohio State ‍‍‍	8	–	16	–	0	.333	22	–	34	–	0	.393
Rutgers ‍‍‍	7	–	16	–	0	.304	19	–	34	–	0	.358
Penn State ‍‍‍	4	–	20	–	0	.167	18	–	37	–	0	.327
† – Conference champion ‡ – Tournament champion y – Invited to the NCAA tournament Rankings from Collegiate Baseball

The 2017 Big Ten Conference baseball tournament was held at Bart Kaufman Field on the campus of Indiana University in Bloomington, Indiana from May 24 through 28. The Iowa Hawkeyes claimed the Big Ten Conference's automatic bid to the 2017 NCAA Division I baseball tournament. The event aired on the Big Ten Network. The event was held in Bloomington for one year before returning to Omaha, Nebraska, site of the College World Series.

== Format and seeding ==
The 2017 tournament was an 8 team double-elimination tournament.

The top eight teams based on conference regular season winning percentage earned invites to the tournament.

The teams then played a double-elimination tournament leading to a single championship game.

== Tournament ==
First round
1	Nebraska	15
8	Purdue	9
4	Maryland	8
5	Iowa	9
8	Purdue	2
4	Maryland	5
2	Michigan	4
7	Northwestern	6
3	Minnesota	5
6	Indiana	4
2	Michigan	4
6	Indiana	5^{(13)}

Second round
1	Nebraska	0
5	Iowa	2
4	Maryland	8
1	Nebraska	5
7	Northwestern	11
3	Minnesota	7
6	Indiana	8
3	Minnesota	9

Semifinals
5	Iowa	3	7^{13}
3	Minnesota	9	5
7	Northwestern	5	6
4	Maryland	9	5

Final
5	Iowa	13
7	Northwestern	4
