= All Sports Stadium =

Former stadium in Oklahoma, United States

Coordinates: 35.47615°N 97.57679°W

- Interactive map of All Sports Stadium
- Location: Oklahoma City, Oklahoma
- Operator: Oklahoma State Fair Park
- Capacity: 15,000
- Surface: Natural grass

Construction
- Opened: 1961
- Closed: 1997
- Demolished: 2005

Tenants
- Oklahoma City 89ers (AA) (1962–1997)

All Sports Stadium was a stadium located at the State Fairgrounds in Oklahoma City, Oklahoma. It had a capacity of 15,000 people and opened in 1961. It was named for the All-Sports Association, a nonprofit charged to recruit amateur and collegiate events to the city.

== History ==
While it was primarily used for baseball and was the home of Oklahoma City 89ers, it was also a popular outdoor concert venue in Oklahoma City. The 89ers baseball team was renamed to Oklahoma RedHawks and moved to AT&T Bricktown Ballpark in 1998. The stadium also hosted various college baseball events, such as Bedlam Baseball between the University of Oklahoma and Oklahoma State University and the Big Eight Conference baseball tournament for more than twenty years.

The stadium was closed in 1997 and demolished in 2005.

== Concerts ==
A popular concert venue dating back to the 1970s, All Sports Stadium hosted a number of bands and musical festivals over the years. Here is a compilation of music events that occurred at the stadium over the years:

=== 1984 ===
- July 12 – Beach Boys

=== 1985 ===
- June 25 – Beach Boys
- August 13 – Jimmy Buffett

=== 1986 ===
- June 9 – Beach Boys

=== 1991 ===
- May 12 – Beach Boys

=== 1998 ===
- July 1 – Lilith Fair, with Sarah McLachlan, Natalie Merchant and Sinéad O'Connor
- July 15 – The Smashing Pumpkins
- September 6 – Seven Mary Three

=== 1999 ===
- May 29 – Sammy Hagar and the Wabos
- August 22 – Mötley Crüe, with opening acts Scorpions and Laidlaw

=== 2000 ===
- June 2 – Stone Temple Pilots
- July 7 – Poison, Cinderella, Dokken and Slaughter
