= Sembower Field =

Baseball stadium in Bloomington, Indiana

Coordinates: 39°10′37″N 86°31′3″W

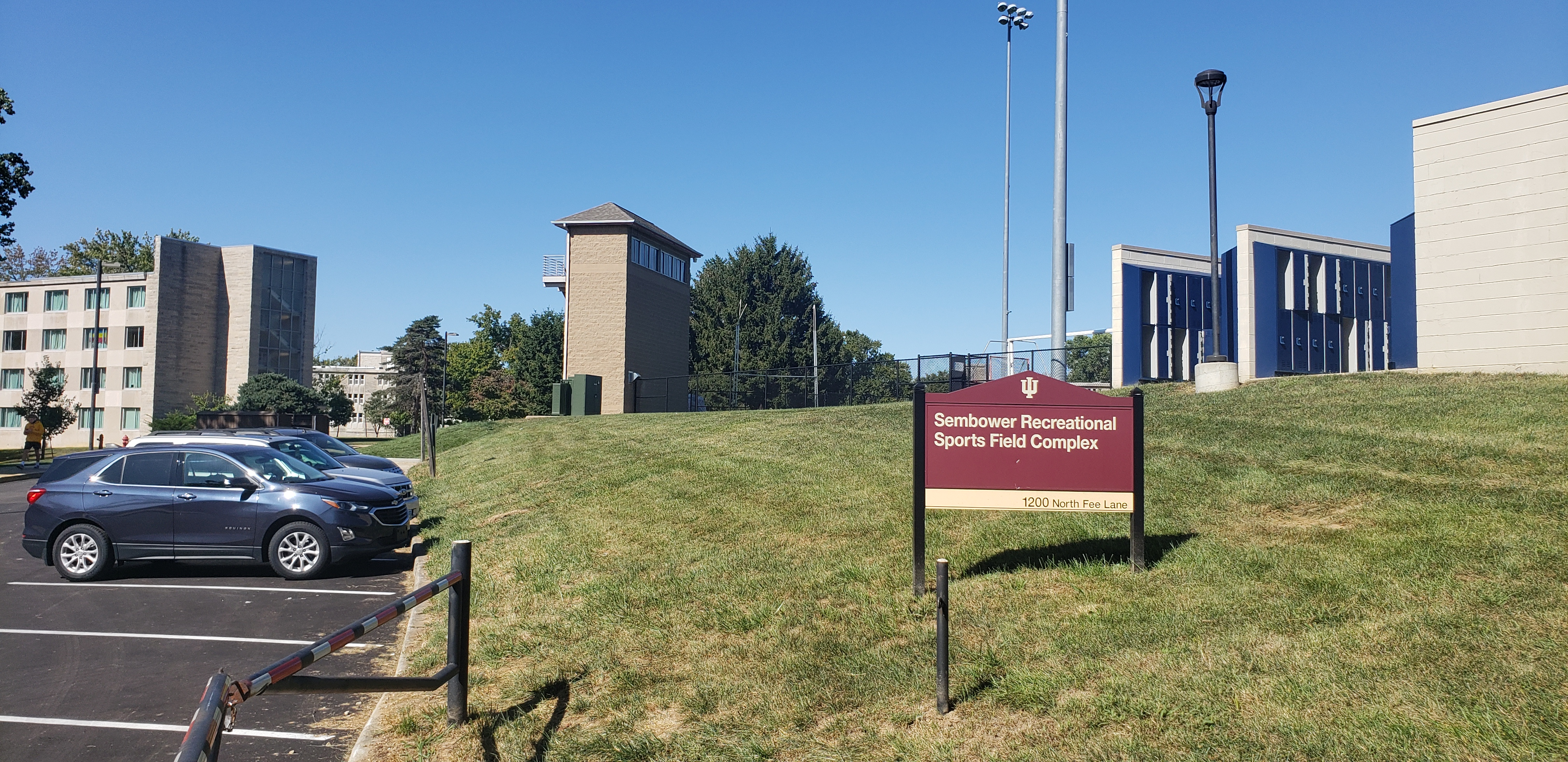
Sembower Field

Sembower Field was a baseball stadium in Bloomington, Indiana. It was the home field of the Indiana University Hoosiers college baseball from 1951 until 2012 and held 2,250 people. It was named after a poet, former Indiana alumni, and avid baseball enthusiast Charles Sembower.

Sembower Field was replaced in the spring of 2013 with a $19.8 million ballpark called Bart Kaufman Field at nearby Fee Lane and IN-46.

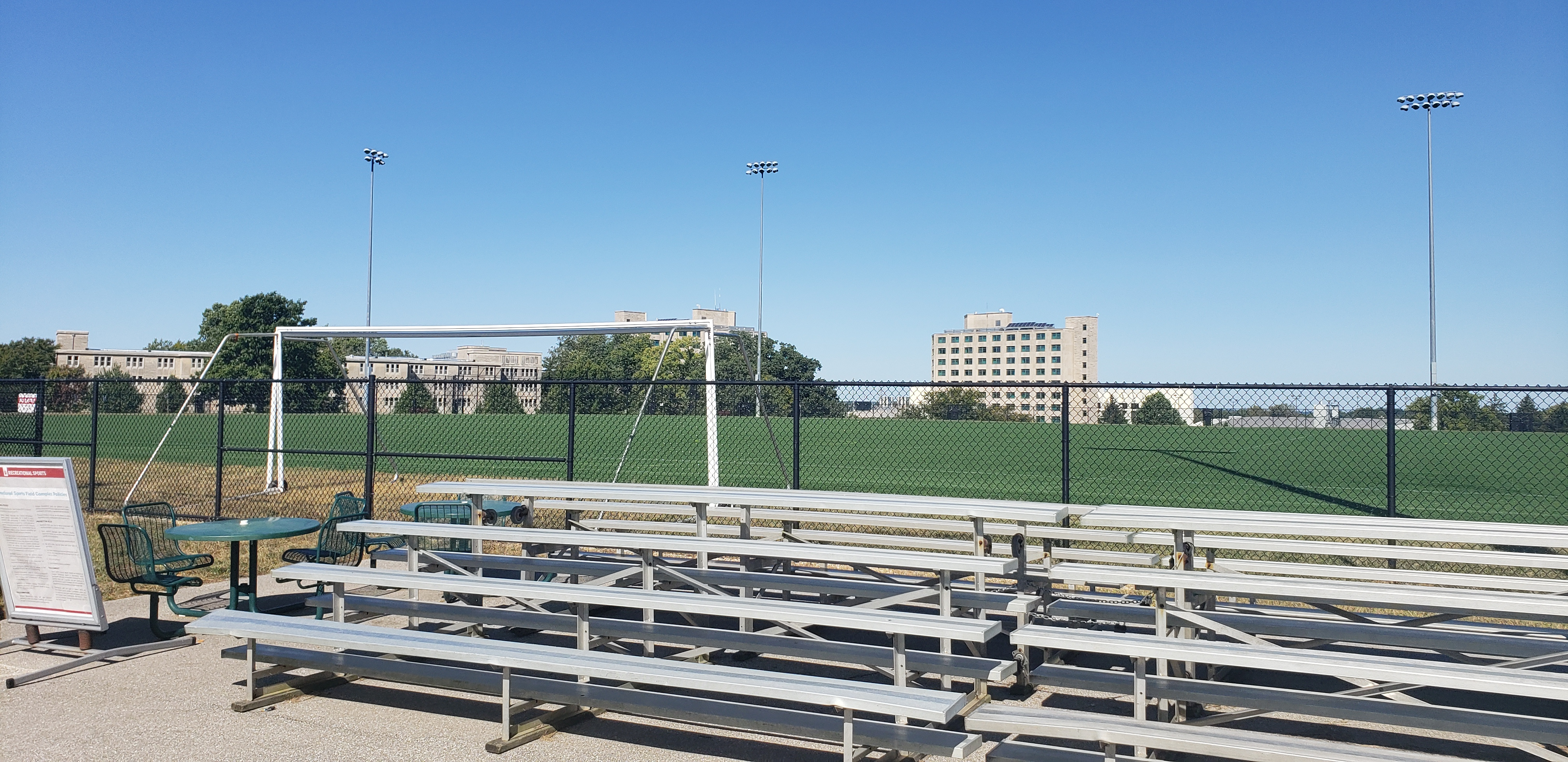
Bleachers at Sembower Field
