= 2016 Big Ten baseball tournament =

2016 Big Ten Conference baseball tournament
- Teams: 8
- Format: Double-elimination
- Finals site: TD Ameritrade Park Omaha; Omaha, NE
- Champions: Ohio State (9th title)
- Winning coach: Greg Beals (1st title)
- MVP: Ronnie Dawson (Ohio State)
- Television: BTN

2016 Big Ten Conference baseball standings
	Conf.						Overall
Team	W		L		T	PCT	W		L		T	PCT
Minnesota ‍†‍‍^{y}	16	–	7	–	0	.696	35	–	21	–	0	.625
Nebraska ‍‍‍^{y}	16	–	8	–	0	.667	37	–	22	–	0	.627
Ohio St. ‍‍‡‍^{y}	15	–	9	–	0	.625	44	–	20	–	1	.685
Indiana ‍‍‍	15	–	9	–	0	.625	32	–	24	–	0	.571
Michigan ‍‍‍	13	–	10	–	0	.565	36	–	21	–	0	.632
Michigan State ‍‍‍	13	–	11	–	0	.542	36	–	20	–	0	.643
Maryland ‍‍‍	13	–	11	–	0	.542	30	–	27	–	0	.526
Illinois ‍‍‍	12	–	12	–	0	.500	28	–	23	–	0	.549
Iowa ‍‍‍	12	–	12	–	0	.500	30	–	26	–	0	.536
Penn State ‍‍‍	12	–	12	–	0	.500	28	–	27	–	0	.509
Rutgers ‍‍‍	9	–	15	–	0	.375	27	–	28	–	0	.491
Northwestern ‍‍‍	7	–	17	–	0	.292	15	–	39	–	0	.278
Purdue ‍‍‍	2	–	22	–	0	.083	10	–	44	–	0	.185
† – Conference champion ‡ – Tournament champion y – Invited to the NCAA tournament As of June 5, 2016; Rankings from Collegiate Baseball

The 2016 Big Ten Conference baseball tournament was held at TD Ameritrade Park Omaha in Omaha, Nebraska, from May 25 through 29. Ohio State claimed the Big Ten Conference's automatic bid to the 2016 NCAA Division I baseball tournament. The event aired on the Big Ten Network.

== Format and seeding ==
The 2016 tournament will be an 8 team double-elimination tournament. The top eight teams based on conference regular season winning percentage earn invites to the tournament. The teams will then play a double-elimination tournament leading to a single championship game. Ties were broken, first, on the basis of head-to-head play (when the tied teams played each other) and, after that, on the basis of record against common opponents. Because Penn State, Illinois, and Iowa did not all play each other, the tie was broken first on common opponents, and, once Penn State was eliminated from the 3-way tie, on the head-to-head series between Iowa and Illinois.

Seed	Team	W	L	Pct	GB	1st Tiebreak	2nd Tiebreak	3rd Tiebreak
1	Minnesota	16	7	.696	—			
2	Nebraska	16	8	.667	.5			
3	Indiana	15	9	.625	1.5	0–0 vs. OSU	10–5 vs. comm. opp.	
4	Ohio State	15	9	.625	1.5	0–0 vs. IND	9–6 vs. comm. opp.	
5	Michigan	13	10	.565	3			
6	Maryland	13	11	.542	3.5	2–1 vs. MSU		
7	Michigan State	13	11	.542	3.5	1–2 vs. UMD		
8	Iowa	12	12	.500	4.5	(did not play PSU)	2–1 vs. comm. opp.	2–1 vs. ILL
—	Illinois	12	12	.500	4.5	—	2–1 vs. comm. opp.	1–2 vs. IA
—	Penn State	12	12	.500	4.5	(did not play IA)	1-2 vs. comm. opp.	—
—	Rutgers	9	15	.375	7.5			
—	Northwestern	7	17	.292	9.5			
—	Purdue	2	22	.083	14.5			

== Tournament ==
First round
1	Minnesota	2
8	Iowa	8
4	Ohio State	8
5	Michigan	3
3	Indiana	6
2	Nebraska	2
2	Nebraska	1
7	Michigan State	5
3	Indiana	3
6	Maryland	5
1	Minnesota	2
5	Michigan	3

Second round
8	Iowa	5
4	Ohio State	4
3	Indiana	0
6	Maryland	3
7	Michigan State	4
6	Maryland	3
4	Ohio State	11
5	Michigan	4

Semifinals
8	Iowa	11	-
6	Maryland	0	-
7	Michigan State	2	3
4	Ohio State	3	7

Final
8	Iowa	7
4	Ohio State	8

== Schedule ==
Game	Time*	Matchup^{#}	Television	Attendance
Wednesday, May 25
1	10:00 a.m.	#3 Indiana vs. #6 Maryland	Big Ten Network	—
2	2:00 p.m.	#2 Nebraska vs. #7 Michigan State	Big Ten Network	—
3	6:00 p.m.	#1 Minnesota vs. #8 Iowa	Big Ten Network	—
4	10:00 p.m.	#4 Ohio State vs. #5 Michigan	Big Ten Network	9,866
Thursday, May 26
5	10:00 a.m.	#3 Indiana vs. #2 Nebraska	Big Ten Network	—
6	2:00 p.m.	#1 Minnesota vs. #5 Michigan	Big Ten Network	—
Friday, May 27
7	10:00 a.m.	#6 Maryland vs. #7 Michigan State	Big Ten Network	—
8	2:00 p.m.	#8 Iowa vs. #4 Ohio State	Big Ten Network	—
9	6:00 p.m.	#3 Indiana vs. #6 Maryland	Big Ten Network	—
10	10:00 p.m.	#5 Michigan vs. #4 Ohio State	Big Ten Network	—
Saturday, May 28
11	10:00 a.m.	#8 Iowa vs. #6 Maryland	Big Ten Network	—
10 (cont)	2:00 p.m.	#5 Michigan vs. #4 Ohio State	Big Ten Network	—
12	6:00 p.m.	#7 Michigan State vs. #4 Ohio State	Big Ten Network	4,810
14^	10:00 a.m. (5/29)	#4 Ohio State vs. #7 Michigan State	Big Ten Network	—
Championship – Sunday, May 29
15	2:00 p.m.	#8 Iowa vs. #4 Ohio State	Big Ten Network	—
*Game times in EDT. # – Rankings denote tournament seed. ^If necessary

Games 7 and 8, originally scheduled for May 26, were postponed to May 27 due to inclement weather. Games 9 and 10 were moved to later start times on May 27. Game 10 postponed in-game on May 27 due to inclement weather, moved to May 28.
