= Big Eight Conference baseball tournament =

Big Eight Conference baseball tournament (defunct)
- Conference baseball championship
- Sport: Baseball
- Conference: Big Eight Conference
- Played: 1976–1996

Host stadiums
- All Sports Stadium (1976–1996)

Host locations
- Oklahoma City, Oklahoma (1976–1996)

The Big Eight Conference baseball tournament was the conference baseball championship of the NCAA Division I Big Eight Conference from 1976 through 1996. The winner of the tournament received an automatic berth to the NCAA Division I Baseball Championship. Throughout the tournament's history, the event was held in Oklahoma City, Oklahoma. Oklahoma State won seventeen titles, including the final sixteen. Oklahoma and Missouri won two titles each.

== Champions ==
=== By year ===
The following is a list of conference champions and sites listed by year.

Year	Program	Site
1976	Missouri	All Sports Stadium • Oklahoma City, Oklahoma
1977	Oklahoma	All Sports Stadium • Oklahoma City, Oklahoma
1978	Oklahoma State	All Sports Stadium • Oklahoma City, Oklahoma
1979	Oklahoma	All Sports Stadium • Oklahoma City, Oklahoma
1980	Missouri	All Sports Stadium • Oklahoma City, Oklahoma
1981	Oklahoma State	All Sports Stadium • Oklahoma City, Oklahoma
1982	Oklahoma State	All Sports Stadium • Oklahoma City, Oklahoma
1983	Oklahoma State	All Sports Stadium • Oklahoma City, Oklahoma
1984	Oklahoma State	All Sports Stadium • Oklahoma City, Oklahoma
1985	Oklahoma State	All Sports Stadium • Oklahoma City, Oklahoma
1986	Oklahoma State	All Sports Stadium • Oklahoma City, Oklahoma
1987	Oklahoma State	All Sports Stadium • Oklahoma City, Oklahoma
1988	Oklahoma State	All Sports Stadium • Oklahoma City, Oklahoma
1989	Oklahoma State	All Sports Stadium • Oklahoma City, Oklahoma
1990	Oklahoma State	All Sports Stadium • Oklahoma City, Oklahoma
1991	Oklahoma State	All Sports Stadium • Oklahoma City, Oklahoma
1992	Oklahoma State	All Sports Stadium • Oklahoma City, Oklahoma
1993	Oklahoma State	All Sports Stadium • Oklahoma City, Oklahoma
1994	Oklahoma State	All Sports Stadium • Oklahoma City, Oklahoma
1995	Oklahoma State	All Sports Stadium • Oklahoma City, Oklahoma
1996	Oklahoma State	All Sports Stadium • Oklahoma City, Oklahoma

=== By school ===
The following is a list of conference champions listed by school.

Program	No. of titles	Title years
Oklahoma State	17	1978, 1981, 1982, 1983, 1984, 1985, 1986, 1987, 1988, 1989, 1990, 1991, 1992, 1993, 1994, 1995, 1996
Missouri	2	1976, 1980
Oklahoma	2	1977, 1979
