= Nebraska Cornhuskers baseball =

NCAA Division I college baseball team

- 2026 Nebraska Cornhuskers baseball team
- Founded: 1889; 137 years ago
- University: University of Nebraska–Lincoln
- Athletic director: Troy Dannen
- Head coach: Will Bolt (7th season)
- Conference: Big Ten
- Location: Lincoln, Nebraska
- Home stadium: Hawks Field (capacity: 8,486)
- Nickname: Cornhuskers
- Colors: Scarlet and cream

College World Series appearances
- 2001, 2002, 2005

NCAA regional champions
- 2000, 2001, 2002, 2005

NCAA tournament appearances
- 1979, 1980, 1985, 1999, 2000, 2001, 2002, 2003, 2005, 2006, 2007, 2008, 2014, 2016, 2017, 2019, 2021, 2024, 2025, 2026

Conference tournament champions
- 1999, 2000, 2001, 2005, 2024, 2025

Conference regular season champions
- 1929, 1948, 1950, 2001, 2003, 2005, 2017, 2021

The Nebraska Cornhuskers baseball team competes as part of NCAA Division I, representing the University of Nebraska–Lincoln in the Big Ten Conference. Nebraska plays its home games at Hawks Field at Haymarket Park, built in 2001 to replace the aging Buck Beltzer Stadium. The program has been coached by Will Bolt since 2020.

Nebraska established a baseball program in 1889, making it the school's oldest active varsity sport. The team was disjointed in its first decades, often disbanding for years at a time. The hiring of Tony Sharpe in 1947 brought stability but limited success – Sharpe and his successor John Sanders combined to lead fifty-one seasons, making just three postseason appearances. Dave Van Horn was hired in 1998 and established a national power, culminating in Nebraska's first College World Series appearances in 2001 and 2002, a landmark moment for a state that has hosted the event since 1950. Assistant Mike Anderson took over for Van Horn and led NU to its best-ever season, finishing 57–15 and reaching another College World Series in 2005. Anderson did not sustain this success and was fired in 2011, the same year Nebraska transitioned to the Big Ten. Since joining the conference, NU has been competitive in the Big Ten but achieved little national success.

Nebraska has appeared in twenty NCAA Division I baseball tournaments and three College World Series. The Cornhuskers have won eight regular season conference championships and six conference tournament championships. Sixteen players have been named first-team All-Americans and Alex Gordon won the 2005 Golden Spikes Award as the country's best amateur player.

== History ==
=== Early history ===
Baseball was established as the University of Nebraska–Lincoln's first organized sport in 1883. Players were divided amongst three nine-player teams based on skill level and participated in scrimmages across campus. The first of these scrimmages was a 31–23 victory for the varsity team over the junior varsity team that had to be cut short because the only available bat broke. This continued for several years until the school played its first intercollegiate baseball game in 1889, a 23–6 victory over Doane College (now Doane University). The program was loosely organized throughout its first decades; most of its early head coaches, including College Football Hall of Famer Edward N. Robinson, led the team for only a single year. In many seasons Nebraska did not play a single intercollegiate game.

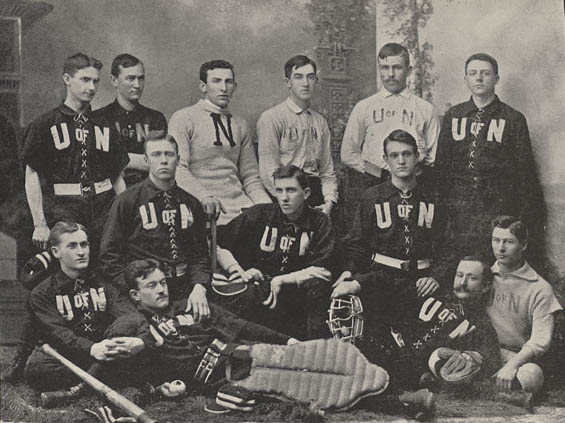
1892 Nebraska baseball team

Following a decade of relative stability, Nebraska's baseball program was discontinued after the 1910 season at the request of the Missouri Valley Intercollegiate Athletic Association (later the Big Eight Conference), despite Nebraska's baseball team competing as an independent. The MVIAA claimed that several of Nebraska's players had played for, and received payment from, minor league teams over the summer, violating the amateur status required of college athletes. After a year without a baseball team of any sort, the program was briefly revived in 1912, playing three games, before shuttering entirely. The ending of World War I and subsequent influx of male students, along with the University of Nebraska's departure from the MVIAA, meant the school's baseball team could be revived under the guidance of Paul J. Schissler in 1919. Schissler led NU's baseball and basketball programs until his departure for Lombard College in 1921; he later served as head coach of the National Football League's Chicago Cardinals and Brooklyn Dodgers and is credited with helping establish the Pro Bowl.

After a second hiatus, Nebraska's baseball program was again revived in 1929 under the guidance of state native John Rhodes. Nebraska rejoined the MVIAA for baseball in 1929, winning the championship in its first-ever season of conference competition. Rhodes left for Wyoming in 1930 and Nebraska struggled through the next decade, never finishing higher than third in the MVIAA.

=== Sharpe and Sanders stability ===
In 1947, following a three-year stoppage for World War II, NU hired Tony Sharpe to lead its baseball program. Sharpe quickly turned the Huskers into a conference contender, winning the conference in 1948 and 1950. In both of these seasons Nebraska appeared in the NCAA District playoffs, the predecessor of the NCAA Super Regionals as they exist today. Bob Cerv became Nebraska's first baseball All-American in 1950; Cerv also played basketball and was the school's first four-year varsity letterwinner in multiple sports. Richard Geier threw the first perfect game in Nebraska baseball history on April 20, 1954. Geier struck out ten on his way to retiring twenty-seven consecutive batters in a 1–0 Cornhuskers victory over Kansas.

Despite the early successes, Sharpe's program stagnated and did not win another conference title for the rest of his thirty-one year tenure as head coach. He earned his 300th victory at Nebraska on March 28, 1972, a 4–3 victory over Houston in the first game of a doubleheader; Houston head coach Lovette Hill earned his 300th victory in the second game, also 4–3. Sharpe retired in 1977 following a 29–13 season that was the program's best in decades.

John Sanders was named Sharpe's replacement after serving for two seasons as an assistant coach. Athletic director Bob Devaney credited Sanders for revitalizing Sharpe's program, which finished 1977 with a school-record twenty-nine wins. Sanders's tenure began in the same way Sharpe's did; the Cornhuskers twice appeared in the NCAA tournament and won the Big Eight Conference in 1980. NU finished the 1980 season ranked fourteenth in the inaugural year of the Baseball America weekly poll. In Nebraska's May 3, 1980 victory over Kansas, pitcher Cliff Faust retired all twenty-one Jayhawks batters who came to the plate, the second perfect game in school history. Faust allowed only five balls hit out of the infield, including a sinking line drive that became the final out of the game when left fielder Joe Scherger made a diving catch.

Sanders was very well-liked by players and supporters, and was sometimes known as "Big Red" due to his imposing stature and red hair. Following his death in 2022, Sanders was praised by former player Jeff Rhein, an African-American, for his support following a 1991 incident in which several Huskers were the target of racial slurs. Under Sanders, Darin Erstad became the No. 1 selection in the 1995 MLB draft.

Despite his popularity and passion for baseball, Sanders's program stalled after a promising start in the same way his predecessor Sharpe's did. After winning the Big Eight in 1980, Nebraska finished nationally ranked three more times under Sanders and appeared in the 1985 NCAA tournament, but never won another conference championship. Sanders was fired following Nebraska's first season in the Big 12 Conference, departing the school with a 767–453–1 record across twenty years. He had only two losing seasons, including his final one. Sanders's 767 wins stood as a school record for any sport until softball coach Rhonda Revelle won her 768th game in 2013.

=== Rise to national prominence ===
Northwestern State head coach Dave Van Horn was hired to replace Sanders just thirty-five days before the 1998 season. In his second season, the Cornhuskers won the program's first conference tournament title, and first championship of any kind since 1950. NU reached the NCAA tournament for the first time since 1985, finishing the season 42–18. On March 16 of the 1999 season, Nebraska defeated Chicago State 50–3, setting NCAA records for runs scored (50), margin of victory (47), and runs batted in (48). Nebraska scored at least four runs in every inning until the game was called following the top of the seventh due to a twelve-run mercy rule. Eight Huskers accounted for nine home runs in the game; Ken Harvey scored a Big 12-record seven runs and Craig Moore became the third NU player to drive in ten runs in a game. Eleven Huskers had at least two hits and seven had at least three hits.

In 2000, led by Big 12 Player of the Year Shane Komine, Nebraska earned the top seed in an NCAA Regional (though it was played in Minneapolis, Minnesota) and won three consecutive games to advance to an NCAA Super Regional for the first time. NU defeated Stanford 7–3 in the first game of the series, but lost the next two. Nebraska began the following season ranked in the national top ten for the first time in school history. A thirteen-game win streak propelled NU to a No. 4 ranking in the Baseball America weekly poll, its highest ever, and the program's first regular-season conference title since 1950. Nebraska went 4–0 in the Big 12 Tournament to win it for the third consecutive year, becoming the first team in the Big 12's short history to win the regular-season and tournament title in the same season. The Cornhuskers earned the No. 8 overall seed in the NCAA tournament and hosted a regional for the first time in school history, defeating Northern Iowa and Rutgers. They advanced to a super regional and swept Rice in the final games played at Buck Beltzer Stadium. In the school's first College World Series appearance, Nebraska lost consecutive one-run games to top-ranked Cal State Fullerton and Tulane. NU finished 50–16, their second straight fifty-win season; Komine won his second Big 12 Pitcher of the Year award and Van Horn was named Baseball America's National Coach of the Year. The University of Nebraska–Lincoln opened Hawks Field at Haymarket Park in 2002, a multi-use facility including stadiums for baseball and softball. The Cornhuskers swept seven teams during the season, including an eleven-game win streak that ended with a loss to Texas in the Big 12 Tournament championship game. Dave Van Horn won his 200th game at Nebraska on May 10 and Jed Morris became the first catcher in school history to earn All-America honors. Nebraska advanced through a regional for the third straight year before hosting Richmond in an NCAA Super Regional. NU defeated the Spiders in three games to advance to Omaha for the second straight season, where they lost to Clemson and South Carolina in the College World Series. After the 2002 season, Van Horn accepted the head coaching position at Arkansas, his alma mater. He departed Nebraska with a record of 214–92 and three straight Big 12 Tournament championships in his five-year tenure.

Longtime assistant coach Mike Anderson was named head coach after Van Horn's departure. Nebraska lost just one conference series in Anderson's first season, going 20–7 and winning the Big 12 again. The Cornhuskers hosted a regional but were eliminated by Southwestern Missouri State, ending the season 47–18. Alex Gordon earned Collegiate Baseball Freshman All-America honors and was named Big 12 Freshman of the Year. In 2004, NU fell to eighth in the Big 12 and failed to win forty games for the first time since 1998, missing the NCAA tournament entirely.

Anderson's third season as head coach became the most successful in program history. Nebraska started the season with a five-game sweep of Hawaii-Hilo and followed by winning twenty of twenty-three games. NU lost just one conference series and split the Big 12 regular season championship with Baylor. After dropping the first game of the Big 12 Tournament, Nebraska won five games in four days, including a 1–0 win over Baylor in the championship game, to win the tournament for the fourth time in six years. The Huskers were named the national No. 3 seed and swept through the regional and super regional rounds, defeating Miami (FL) to advance to the College World Series for the third time in five years. The Cornhuskers defeated Arizona State 5–3 for the first College World Series win in program history, but lost the next two games and were eliminated. Nebraska's fifty-seven wins, including thirty-three at home, were the most in the country and a school record. Led by Johnny Dorn and Big 12 Newcomer of the Year Joba Chamberlain, NU ranked second nationally in ERA, and Alex Gordon won the Golden Spikes Award as the top amateur baseball player in the country.

=== Decline and move to the Big Ten ===
Nebraska spent much of the 2006 season in the top five nationally, reaching as high as No. 2, but lost eleven of its last seventeen games and failed to advance out of its regional. The following season followed a similar trajectory; NU began the season ranked ninth nationally, but finished just fourth in the Big 12 and were eliminated a game short of reaching a super regional. NU lost eight pitchers to the MLB draft prior to 2008, and despite a fourteen-game win streak which helped the young team reach a No. 5 national ranking, the Huskers again lost in a home regional. Nebraska lost several key players, including star pitcher Johnny Dorn, following the 2008 season, and the program's tenth-place Big 12 finish in 2009 was its worst since 1997. Anderson was fired in 2011 after missing the postseason entirely in each of his last three seasons, departing with a 337–196–2 record across nine seasons.

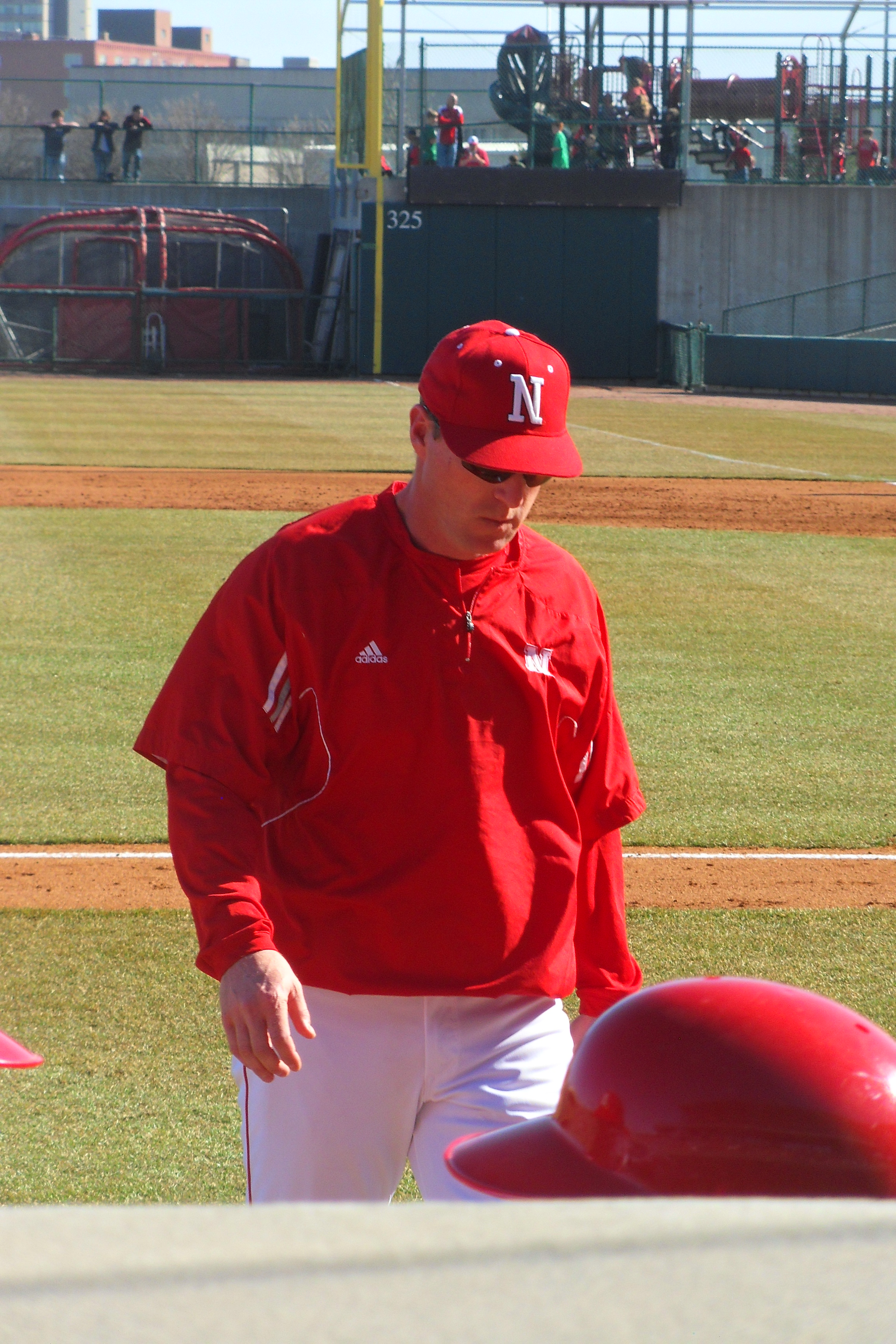
Darin Erstad

Before Nebraska began its first season in the Big Ten in 2012, the school hired former Husker outfielder and Major League Baseball All-Star Darin Erstad as head coach. Ted Silva was hired as Erstad's pitching coach and former Huskers Will Bolt and Jeff Christy were named assistants. Nebraska earned the No. 4 seed in the Big Ten Tournament in Erstad's first season, the program's first postseason appearance of any kind since 2008.

Nebraska lost its first seven games of the 2013 season, its worst start since 1976. The team improved significantly as conference play began, and on April 16 three NU pitchers combined to no-hit twelfth-ranked Arkansas, led by former Huskers head coach Dave Van Horn. Despite a second-place Big Ten finish and the No. 31 RPI rank in the country, normally strong enough to qualify for the NCAA tournament, NU's sub-.500 record disqualified them from consideration. NU again finished second in the Big Ten in 2014, returning to the NCAA tournament for the first time in six years. After three conference runner-up finishes under Erstad, Nebraska won its first Big Ten regular-season championship in 2017. The Cornhuskers lost to Maryland in the second round of the conference tournament; their quick elimination from the NCAA tournament dropped Erstad's record as a head coach in NCAA Regionals to 0–6. Nebraska won its first NCAA tournament game under Erstad in 2019, but a blown eighth-inning lead against Oklahoma State and a blowout loss to Connecticut again eliminated the Huskers. Erstad resigned as head coach following the 2019 season, citing his desire to spend time with his family.

Will Bolt was named Nebraska's twenty-sixth head coach after Erstad's retirement. After his first season was cut short due to the COVID-19 pandemic, Bolt's team won the 2021 Big Ten regular-season championship and won multiple games in the NCAA tournament for the first time since 2007.

== Conference affiliations ==
- Independent (1889–1925)
- Missouri Valley Intercollegiate Athletic Association / Big Eight Conference (1929–1996) (Note: In 1928, the ten member schools of the Missouri Valley Intercollegiate Athletic Association agreed to a splintering of the conference – Iowa State, Kansas, Kansas State, Missouri, Nebraska, and Oklahoma retained the MVIAA name and Drake, Grinnell, Oklahoma A&M (now Oklahoma State), and Washington University formed the Missouri Valley Conference. The MVIAA became commonly known as the Big Six, and later the Big Seven and Big Eight. Its name was officially changed to the Big Eight in 1964.)
- Big 12 Conference (1997–2011)
- Big Ten Conference (2012–present)

== Coaches ==
=== Coaching history ===
In its early years, Nebraska's program cycled through head coaches, most of whom led the program for a single year. The Cornhuskers competed as an independent until 1929, when John Rhodes led the team to the MVIAA championship. W. W. Knight, hired forty-four years after the program's first season of competition, was Nebraska's first head coach to hold the position for more than three years.

After decades of heavy coaching turnover, the hire of Tony Sharpe in 1947 brought stability to the program for the first time; Sharpe and his successor John Sanders led Nebraska for a combined fifty-one years. However, this consistency did not translate to on-field success, as the two coaches combined for just three NCAA tournament appearances. NU's first national success arrived with the hire of Dave Van Horn in 1998, who took the program to its first College World Series appearances in 2001 and 2002. When Van Horn resigned to return to his alma mater Arkansas after the 2002 season, assistant Mike Anderson succeeded him and led NU to a program-record fifty-seven wins and another College World Series appearance in 2005.

Nebraska has been coached by Will Bolt since 2020.

=== Coaching staff ===
Coach	Position	First year	Alma mater
Will Bolt	Head coach	2020	Nebraska
Rob Childress	Assistant coach	2024	Northwood
Lance Harvell	Assistant coach	2020	Texas A&M
Mike Sirianni	Assistant coach	2024	Arkansas State

== Venues ==
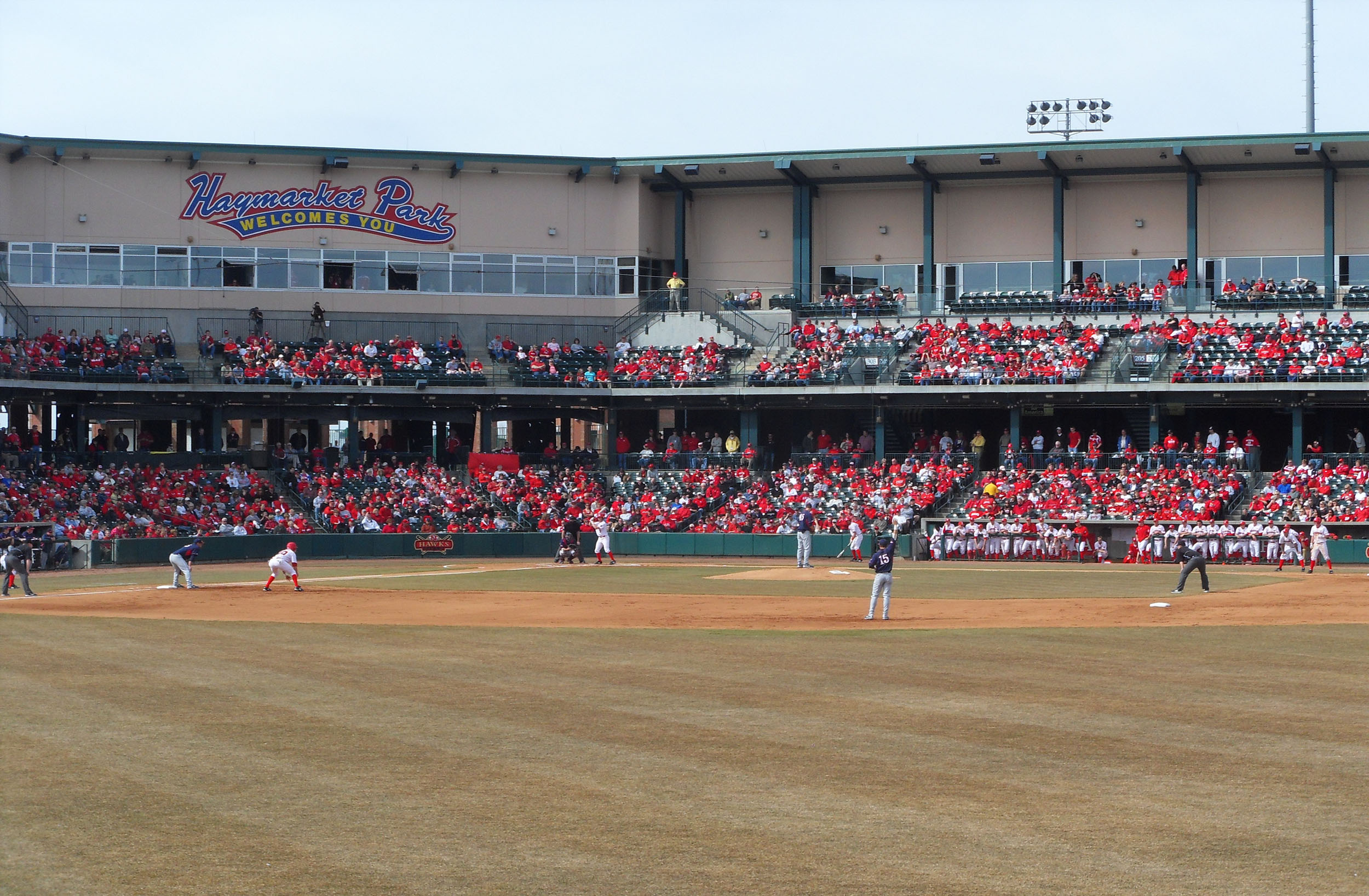
Nebraska vs. Fresno State at Hawks Field at Haymarket Park on Mar. 11, 2011

=== Buck Beltzer Stadium ===
The Cornhuskers played at Buck Beltzer Stadium (originally The Nebraska Diamond) from the 1940s until 2001. It was named after Oren "Buck" Beltzer, a standout football and baseball player in the early 1900s. The stadium was located northeast of Memorial Stadium and adjacent to Interstate 180. Its 1,500-seat capacity was expanded with additional bleacher sections shipped in for NCAA tournament games. The five NCAA tournament games hosted at Buck Beltzer Stadium produced its five largest-ever crowds. Nebraska's final game at the stadium was a 9–6 win over Rice to send the program to its first College World Series.

By the time of its closing, Buck Beltzer Stadium was considered out-of-date and lacked many features common among similar venues. The stadium did not have a warning track or a permanent fence because Nebraska's football team used the outfield to practice for games to be played on grass. These practices meant the outfield was often covered in divots, making ground balls difficult for outfielders to properly field (termed "the bounce of the Buck" or "the Buck bounce"). Despite its shortcomings, Buck Beltzer Stadium was generally well-liked by Nebraska's players and supporters due to its unique features and intimate environment. Nebraska's all-time record at Buck Beltzer Stadium was 527–137.

=== Hawks Field at Haymarket Park ===
The University of Nebraska–Lincoln announced plans to construct a new baseball and softball stadium complex on July 30, 1999. Haymarket Park broke ground on April 12, 2000, just off U.S. Route 6 and Charleston Street west of downtown Lincoln. The baseball portion of the facility was oriented such that downtown Lincoln, and especially Memorial Stadium, can be clearly viewed over the outfield walls. Nebraska played its first game at Hawks Field on March 4, 2002, a 23–1 victory over Nebraska–Kearney.

Hawks Field is named for Myrna Hawks, the wife of prominent Omaha businessman Howard Hawks; the couple were significant donors to the construction of the complex. Hawks Field has a listed capacity of 8,486; NU ranked fourteenth nationally in total attendance in 2025 and regularly leads the Big Ten Conference in attendance. The highest recorded attendance at Hawks Field was on April 14, 2006, when 8,757 watched Nebraska defeat Texas A&M 4–3.

Alex Gordon Training Complex

Nebraska constructed the $4.75-million Alex Gordon Training Complex in 2011, adjacent to Bowlin Stadium and just northeast of Hawks Field. The facility was named for former NU All-American and Major League Baseball All-Star Alex Gordon, who donated one million dollars to the project.

== Championships and awards ==
=== NCAA Division I tournament ===
- College World Series appearances: 2001, 2002, 2005
- Regional championships: 2000, 2001, 2002, 2005

=== Conference championships ===
Regular season

- MVIAA / Big Eight: 1929, 1948, 1950
- Big 12: 2001, 2003, 2005
- Big Ten: 2017, 2021

Tournament

- Big 12: 1999, 2000, 2001, 2005
- Big Ten: 2024, 2025

=== NCAA records ===
- Runs in a game: 50 (Mar. 16, 1999 vs. Chicago State)
- Runs batted in in a game: 48 (Mar. 16, 1999 vs. Chicago State)
- Total bases in a game: 73 (Mar. 16, 1999 vs. Chicago State)

== Postseason results ==
=== NCAA Division I tournament ===
Nebraska has appeared in twenty NCAA Division I tournaments with a record of 39-39, including three trips to the College World Series. The school made two appearances in the district playoffs, which the NCAA does not consider official tournament appearances.

Year	Seed	Round	Opponent	Result
1948 (Note: Nebraska twice appeared in the NCAA Baseball District playoffs, a predecessor of super regionals in which the winner of a best-of-three series advanced to the College World Series. These are not counted as NCAA tournament appearances according to the official NCAA record book. The NCAA Division I tournament was established in 1954.)		District playoff	Oklahoma A&M	W 7–5, L 5–4, L 8–5
1950		District playoff	Bradley	L 10–6, L 8–4
1979		Regional	St. John's; Navy; Connecticut	L 5–0; W 13–4; L 15–0
1980		Regional	BYU; Michigan	W 12–0, W 12–4; L 7–0, L 12–3
1985		Regional	Pepperdine; Stanford	W 4–2, L 7–6; L 9–8
1999	2	Regional	(3) Mississippi State (4) Bowling Green	L 18–14, L 13–7; W 10–5
2000	1	Regional	(4) Butler (3) Minnesota (2) Wichita State	W 2–1; W 4–1; W 8–1
2000	1	Super regional	(1) Stanford	W 7–3, L 7–1, L 5–3
2001	1	Regional	(4) Northern Iowa (2) Rutgers	W 16–6; W 5–4, W 14–10
2001	1	Super regional	(1) Rice	W 7–0, W 9–6
2001	8	College World Series	(1) Cal State Fullerton (5) Tulane	L 5–4; L 6–5
2002	1	Regional	(4) Milwaukee (3) Marist (2) Southwest Missouri State	W 16–6; W 5–4; W 14–3
2002	1	Super regional	(1) Richmond	W 2–0, L 6–2, W 11–6
2002		College World Series	(2) Clemson (6) South Carolina	L 11–10; L 10–8
2003	1	Regional	(4) Eastern Michigan (2) Southwest Missouri State	W 16–11, W 18–2; L 4–2, W 9–5, L 7–0
2005	1	Regional	(4) UIC (3) Creighton	W 8–6; W 10–8, W 10–2
2005	1	Super regional	(1) Miami (FL)	W 3–1, W 6–3
2005	3	College World Series	Arizona State (7) Florida	W 5–3, L 8–7; L 7–4
2006	1	Regional	(4) Manhattan (3) San Francisco	L 4–1; L 5–1
2007	3	Regional	(2) UC Riverside (4) Monmouth (1) Arizona State	L 10–5, W 11–1; W 6–5; L 19–7
2008	1	Regional	(4) Eastern Illinois (2) UC Irvine (3) Oral Roberts	W 13–10; L 3–2; L 8–0
2014	2	Regional	(3) Cal State Fullerton (4) Binghamton	L 5–1, L 4–3; W 8–6
2016	3	Regional	(2) Oklahoma State (4) Western Carolina	L 6–0; L 4–1
2017	2	Regional	(3) Yale (4) Holy Cross	L 5–1; L 7–4
2019	3	Regional	(2) Connecticut (1) Oklahoma State	W 8–5, L 16–1; L 6–5
2021	2	Regional	(3) Northeastern (1) Arkansas (4) NJIT	W 8–6; L 5–1, W 5–3, L 6–2; W 18–4
2024	2	Regional	(3) Florida (4) Niagara	L 5–2, L 17–11; W 7–5
2025	3	Regional	(2) Oklahoma (4) Holy Cross	L 7–4, L 17–1; W 4–1
2026	1	Regional	(4) South Dakota State (2) Ole Miss (3) Arizona State	W 4–1; L 6–3; L 11–8

=== Conference tournament ===
Nebraska has appeared in thirty-six conference tournaments across the Big Eight, Big 12, and Big Ten with a record of 71–59, including six championships.

Year	Seed	Record	Finish
Big Eight Conference (Note: The Big Eight did not sponsor a baseball tournament until 1976.) (1976–1996)
1976		0–2	First round
1979	2E	2–2	Runner-up
1980	1E	2–2	Runner-up
1981	4	3–2	Runner-up
1982	2	1–2	Third place
1983	5	2–2	Semifinal
1984	3	1–2	Third place
1985	3	1–2	Third place
1986	3	0–2	Fourth place
1987	3	0–2	Fourth place
1988	4	0–2	Fourth place
1990	3	1–2	Third place
1993	4	2–2	Third place
1994	5	2–2	Third place
1995	4	1–2	Semifinal
Big 12 Conference (1997–2011)
1999	5	4–0	Champion
2000	2	5–1	Champion
2001	1	4–0	Champion
2002	2	3–1	Runner-up
2003	1	2–2	Semifinal
2004	8	1–2	Second round
2005	1	5–1	Champion
2006	4	3–1	Runner-up
2007	4	1–2	Pool play
2008	3	1–2	Pool play
Big Ten Conference (2012–present)
2012	4	1–2	Second round
2013	3	4–2	Runner-up
2014	2	3–1	Runner-up
2015	8	0–2	First round
2016	2	0–2	First round
2017	1	1–2	Second round
2019	5	3–2	Runner-up
2023	4	2–2	Second round
2024	2	5–1	Champion
2025	8	4-0	Champion
2026	2	1-1	Semifinal

== Rivalries ==
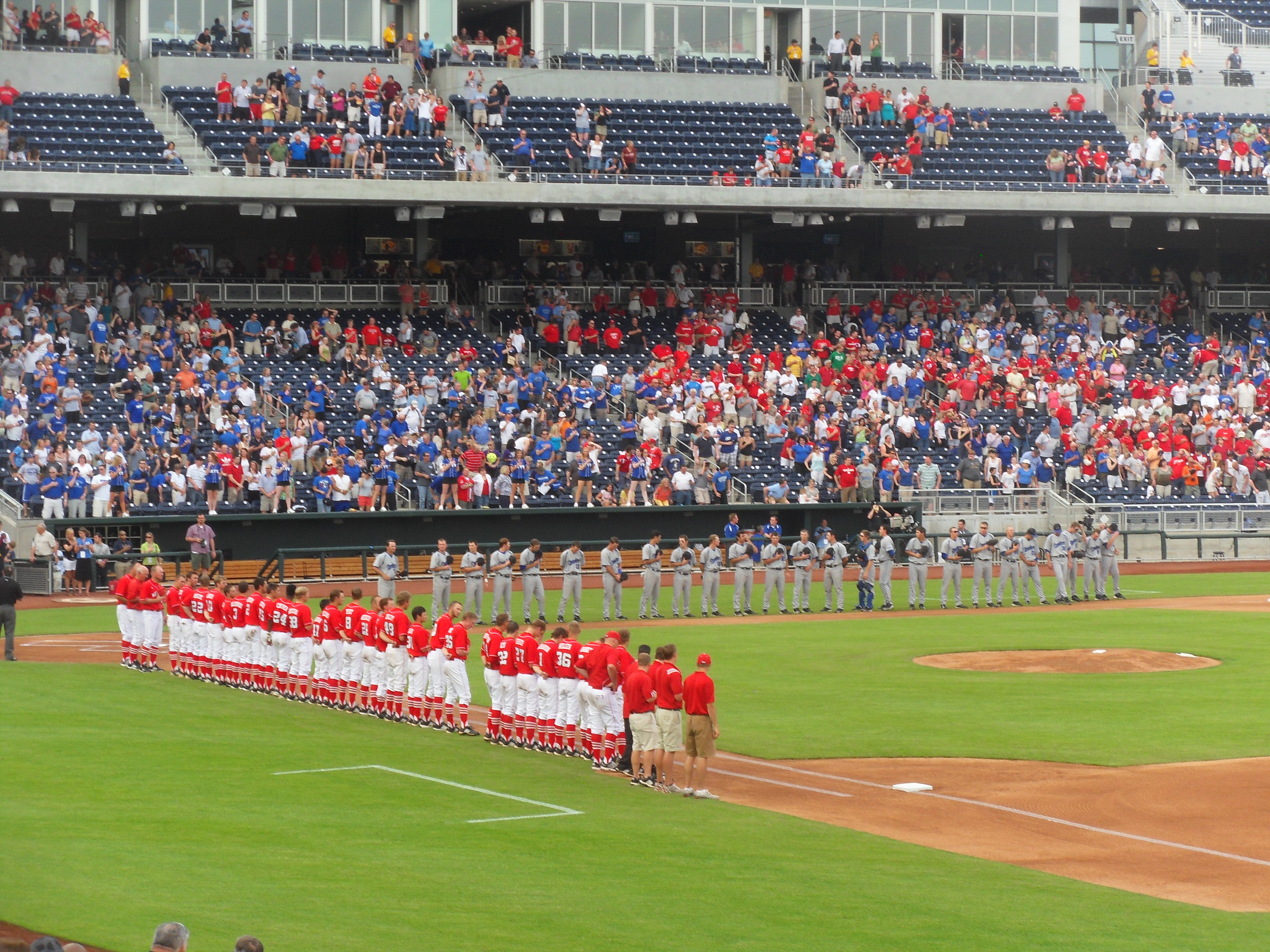
Nebraska vs. Creighton at TD Ameritrade Park on April 19, 2011

Nebraska and Creighton have competed in an in-state rivalry since their first meeting in 1902, a 9–3 Nebraska win. The Huskers and Bluejays play a non-consecutive series each year, switching venues for each game. Creighton originally played home games at the Creighton Sports Complex and occasionally Rosenblatt Stadium before moving to TD Ameritrade Park (now Charles Schwab Field) in 2011. The Huskers defeated the Bluejays 2–1 in the first game between the teams at TD Ameritrade Park on April 19, 2011. Nebraska leads the series 87–57–2. However, Creighton has won the last 10 out of 12 matchups dating back to 2017.

Nebraska also plays a non-consecutive series against Omaha each year. Nebraska leads the series 61–12.

== After Nebraska ==
=== MLB players ===
Forty-six former Cornhuskers have played at least one Major League Baseball game.

- Ad Liska – 1929–1933
- Bob Cerv – 1951–1962
- Dwight Siebler – 1963–1967
- Stan Bahnsen – 1966–1982
- Dave McDonald – 1969–1971
- Gary Neibauer – 1969–1973
- Buddy Hunter – 1971–1975
- Ryan Kurosaki – 1975
- Pete O'Brien – 1982–1993
- Tim Burke – 1985–1992
- Bob Sebra – 1985–1990
- Steve Stanicek – 1987, 1989
- Bill McGuire – 1988–1989
- Kip Gross – 1990–1993, 1999–2000
- Eric Helfand – 1993–1995
- Kevin Jordan – 1995–2001
- Darin Erstad – 1996–2009
- Ken Ramos – 1997
- Marc Sagmoen – 1997
- Troy Brohawn – 2001–2003
- Ken Harvey – 2001–2005
- Todd Sears – 2002–2003
- Jamal Strong – 2003–2005
- Dan Johnson – 2005–2008, 2010–2012
- Adam Shabala – 2005
- Adam Stern – 2005–2007, 2010
- Drew Anderson – 2006
- Shane Komine – 2006–2007
- Joba Chamberlain – 2007–2017
- Alex Gordon – 2007–2020
- Brian Duensing – 2009–2018
- Adam Moore – 2009–2016, 2018
- Zach Kroenke – 2010–2011
- Andrew Brown – 2011–2012
- Steve Edlefsen – 2011–2012
- Tony Watson – 2011–2021
- Dan Jennings – 2012–2019
- Thad Weber – 2012–2013
- Cody Asche – 2013–2017
- Michael Mariot – 2014–2016
- Aaron Bummer – 2017–present
- Jake Meyers – 2021–present
- Nate Fisher – 2022
- Matt Waldron – 2023–present
- Spencer Schwellenbach – 2024–present
- Cade Povich – 2024–present

=== Olympians ===
Olympiad	City	Player	Country	Finish
2004 (XXVIII)	(Greece) Athens	Adam Stern	Canada	Fourth place
2008 (XXIX)	(China) Beijing	Brian Duensing	United States	(bronze) Third place
2008 (XXIX)	(China) Beijing	Adam Stern	Canada	Group stage
