= Bart Kaufman Field =

Baseball field in Bloomington, Indiana, US

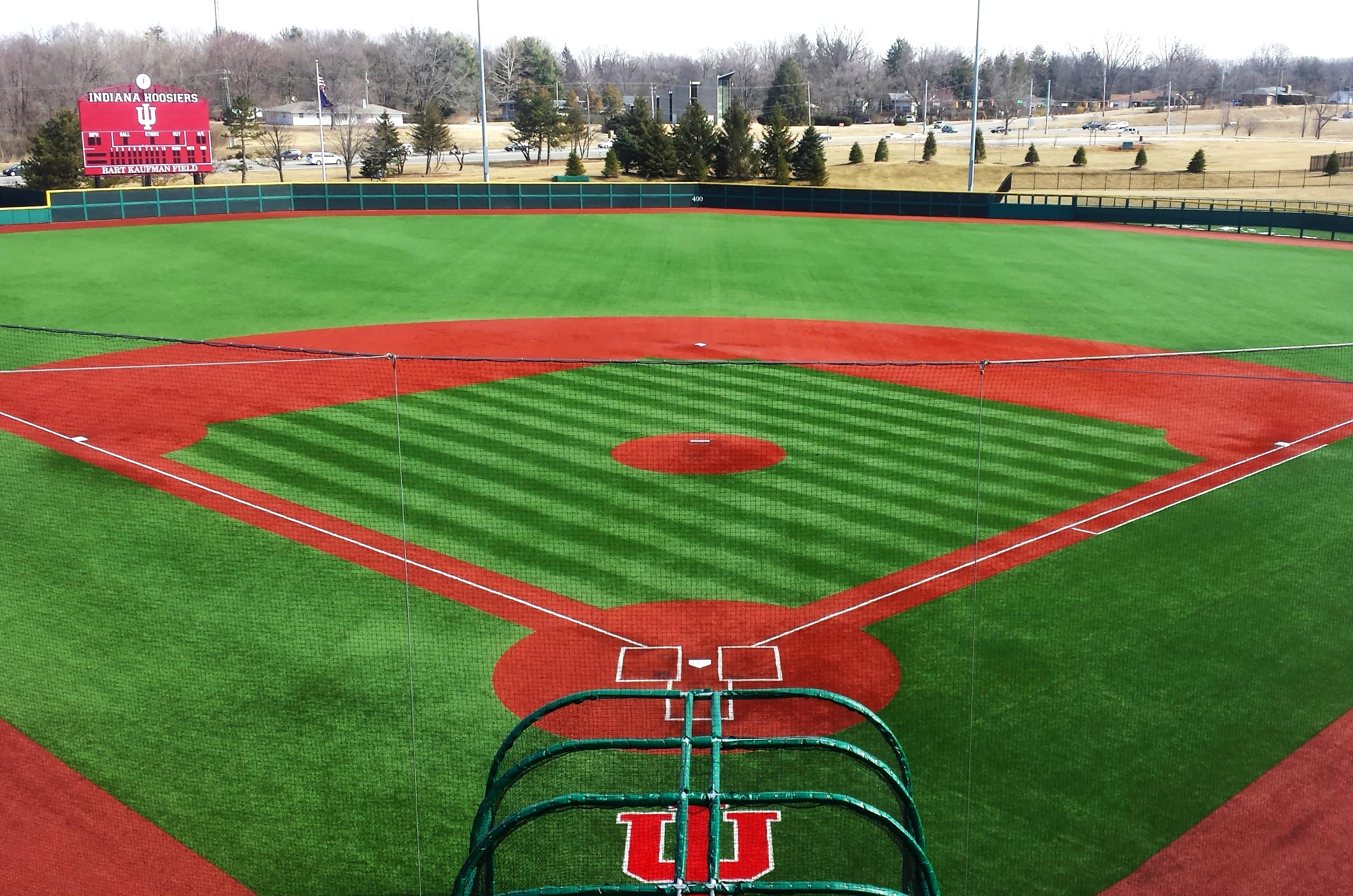
- Bart Kaufman Field in Bloomington, Indiana

- Location within Indiana Location within the United States
- Address: 1873 N. Fee Lane
- Location: Bloomington, Indiana
- Coordinates: 39.184809°N 86.522539°W
- Owner: Indiana University
- Operator: Indiana University
- Capacity: 2,500
- Type: Stadium
- Event: Baseball
- Surface: AstroTurf GameDay Grass 3D Xtreme
- Record attendance: 4,312
- Field size: LF: 330 ft (100.6 m); LC: 370 ft (112.8 m); CF: 400 ft (121.9 m); RC: 380 ft (115.8 m); RF: 340 ft (103.6 m)

Construction
- Groundbreaking: May, 2012
- Built: 2012–2013
- Opened: 20 March 2013
- Cost: US$19.8 million
- Architect: Browning Day Mullins Dierdorf

Tenants
- Indiana Hoosiers baseball (2013–present); Big Ten Conference Tournament (2017)

Website
- iuhoosiers.com/facilities/bart-kaufman-field-baseball/1

Bart Kaufman Field is a baseball field in Bloomington, Indiana. It is home of the Indiana Hoosiers baseball team. The capacity of the facility is 2,500 spectators. It is named after Bart Kaufman, an alumnus who played from 1960 to 1962. In 1961 he was the second-leading hitter (.452) in the Big Ten to longtime Detroit Tigers player Bill Freehan of the University of Michigan. Kaufman pledged $2.5 million to get the project going. Many teammates contributed to name the Indiana dugout after longtime baseball coach Ernie Andres. Much of the cost, reported to be in excess of $19 million including Andy Mohr Field for softball, was funded by proceeds from the Big Ten Network.

The stadium hosted an NCAA Regional in its first two years of existence; it marked the first two times the IU baseball program has played tournament games on campus. Bart Kaufman Field hosted its first Big Ten baseball tournament from May 24 to 28, 2017.

== History ==
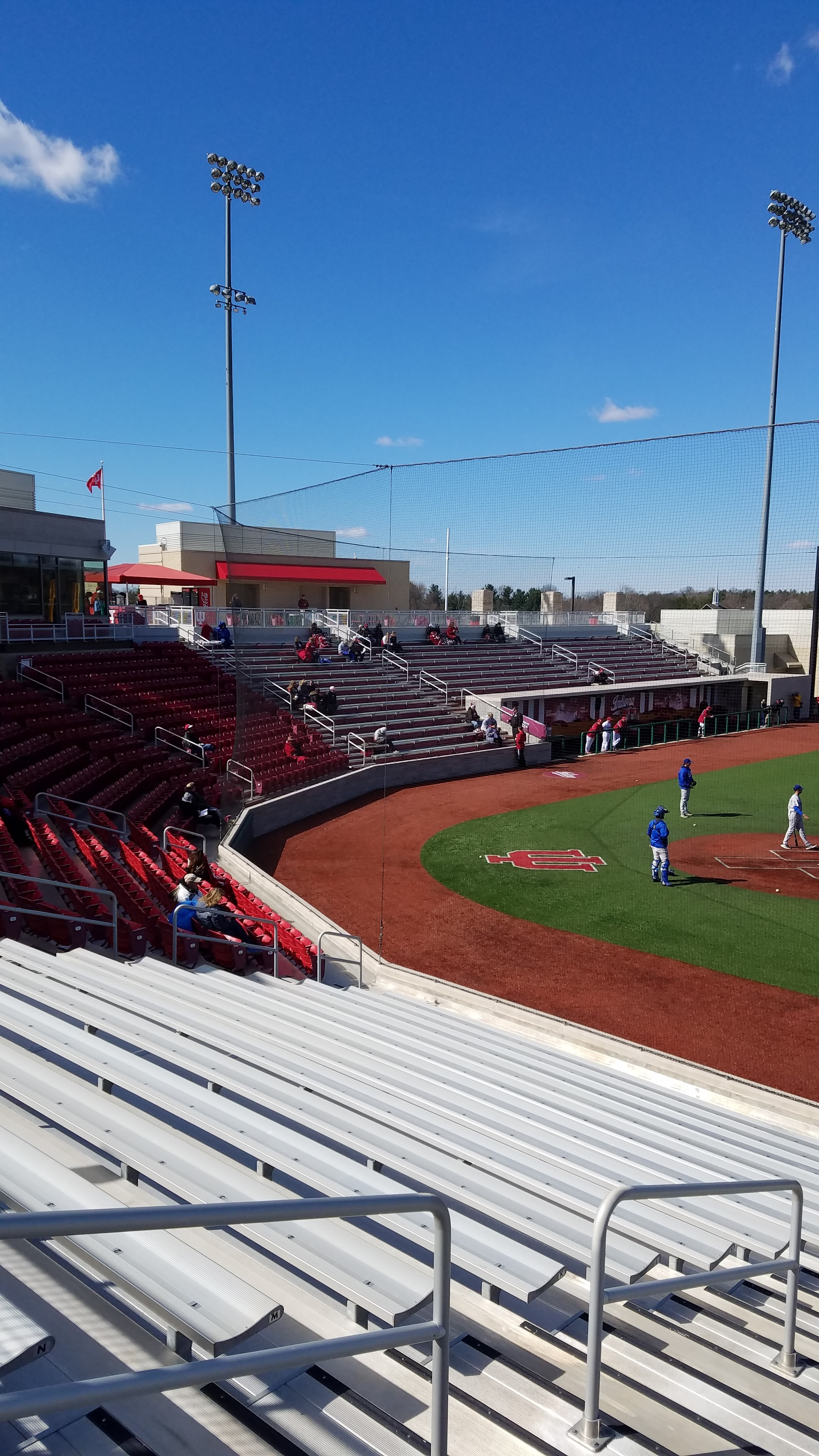
Grandstands

On August 19, 2011, the Indiana University Board of Trustees approved plans for a new baseball–softball complex. These new fields would be located just north of Assembly Hall, near the intersection of the 45/46 bypass and Fee Lane. The new baseball field would replace Sembower Field, which had been the Hoosiers' home field since 1951. On February 15, 2012, Indiana University announced that the new baseball field would be named after Bart Kaufman, CEO of the Indianapolis-based Kaufman Financial Corporation, and an Indiana baseball alumnus. This announcement came after Kaufman pledged $2.5 million to the construction of a new stadium.

Construction began on Bart Kaufman Field in May 2012, and was finished in March 2013; the stadium was formally dedicated on April 26 of that year. The Hoosiers' first game in the stadium was March 20, 2013, with a 15–1 win over Miami University.

On December 19, 2017, Indiana University Athletics announced plans to install an LED video scoreboard, beyond the outfield wall. The size of the new scoreboard is estimated to be 26.8 feet (8.16 m) high by 48.7 (14.84 m) feet wide. Installation of the new scoreboard was completed prior to the start of the 2018 season, with it being utilized for the Hoosiers' home opener on March 6, 2018, against Cincinnati.

== Features ==
The facility has a clubhouse and locker room, training area and team rooms, indoor and outdoor hitting cages, turf field, press box, lights for night play, bench and stadium chair seating, entry plaza, picnic area, concessions and restrooms.

== Attendance ==
Year	Total Yearly Attendance	Average Attendance
2013	35,800	1,704
2014	68,715	2,749
2015	55,185	2,207
2016	49,479	1,979
2017	49,399	2,058
2018	49,446	1,902
2019	48,027	2,001
2022	35,068	1,670

Top 10 Largest Crowds
	Attendance	Opponent	Date
1	4,312	Stanford	May 31, 2014
2	4,125	Youngstown St	May 30, 2014
3	3,862	Purdue	May 4, 2014
4	3,661	Purdue	May 3, 2014
5	3,524	Stanford	June 1, 2014
6	3,248	Minnesota	May 17, 2014
7	3,214	Austin Peay	June 2, 2013
8	3,193	Ohio State	May 15, 2015
9	3,077	Louisville	May 16, 2017
10	3,045	Valparaiso	May 31, 2013

== Pictures ==
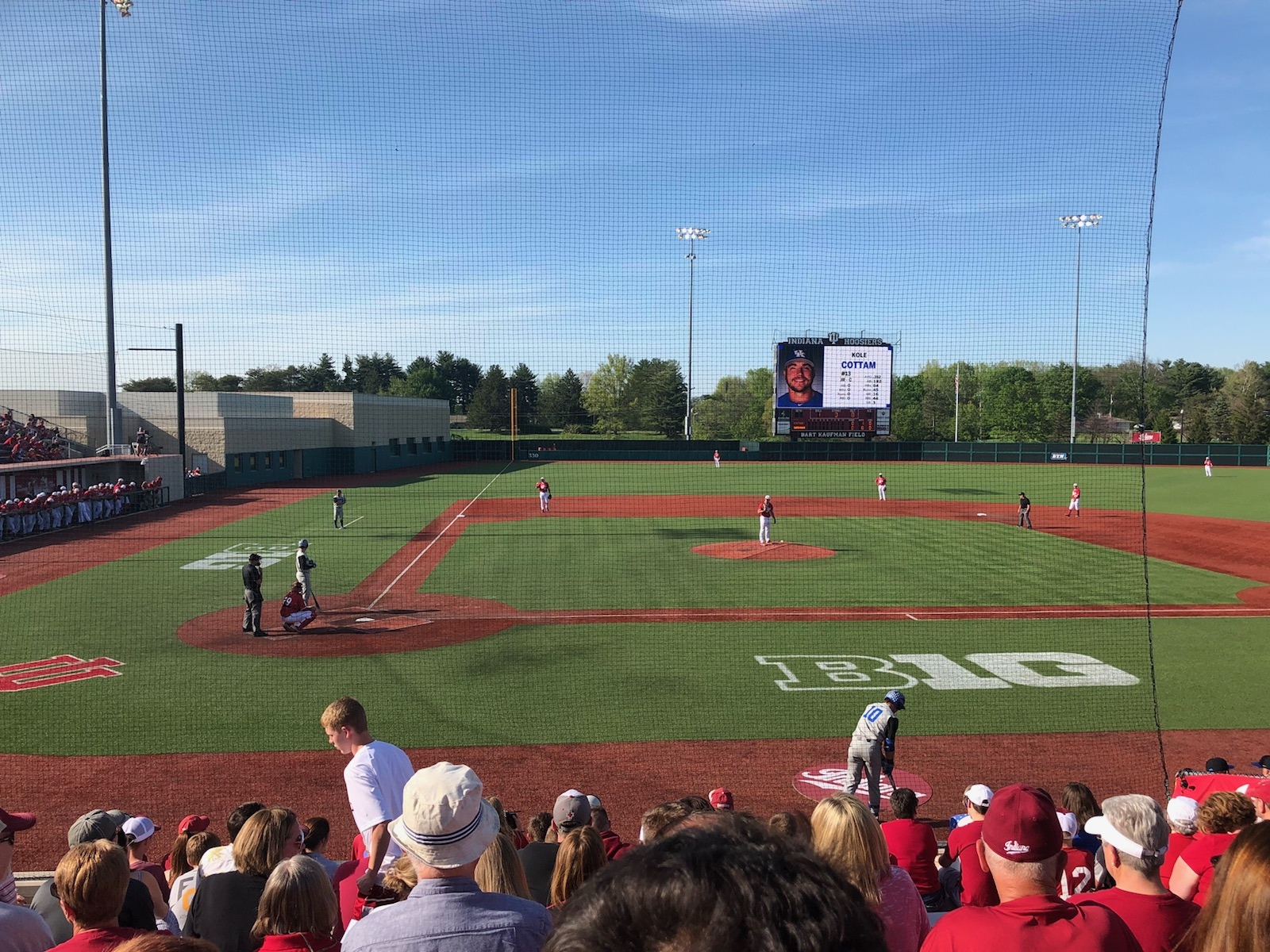
Bart Kaufman - Left Field (2018) - New video scoreboard

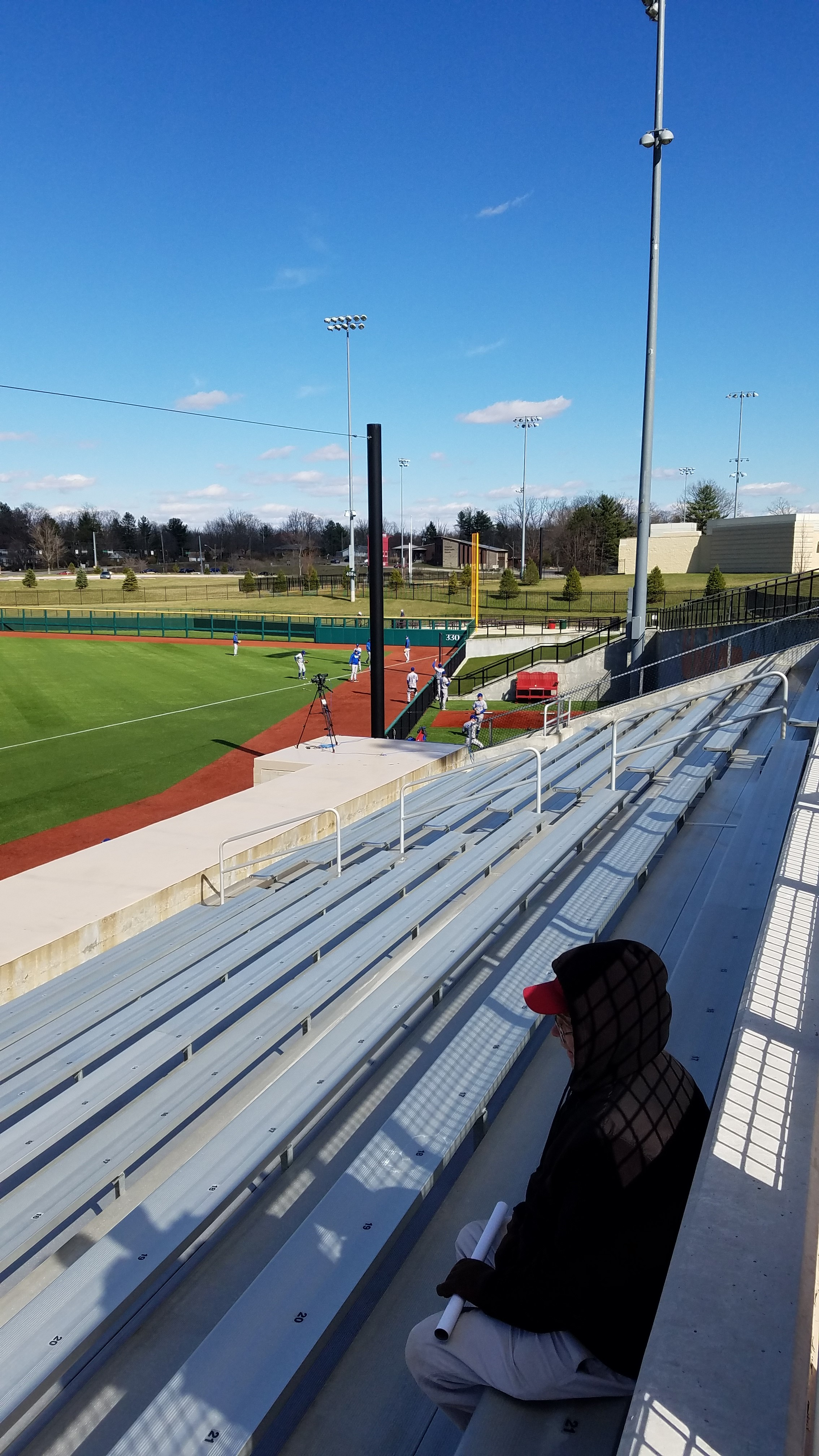
Right Field from South stands

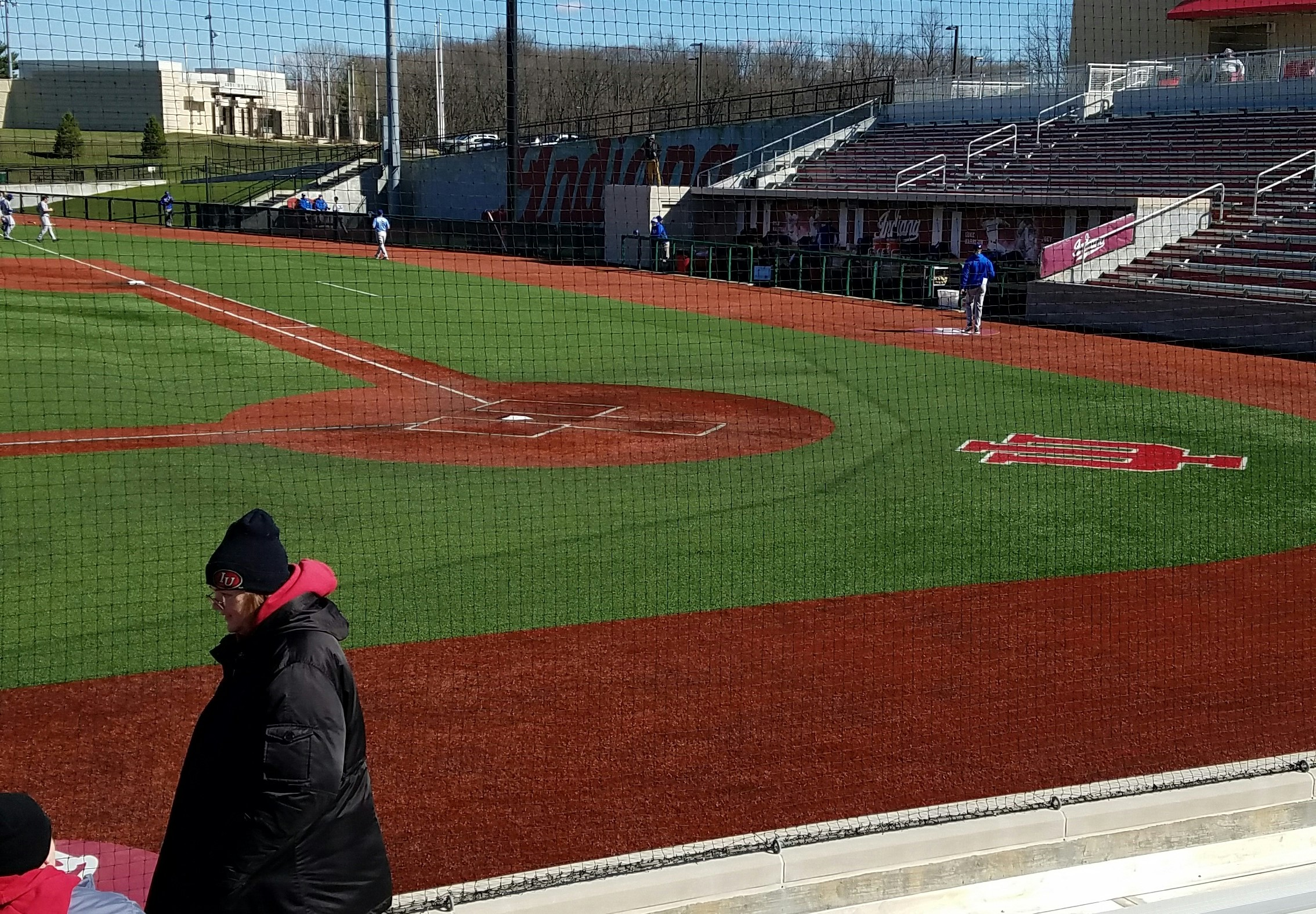
Home Plate from West stands

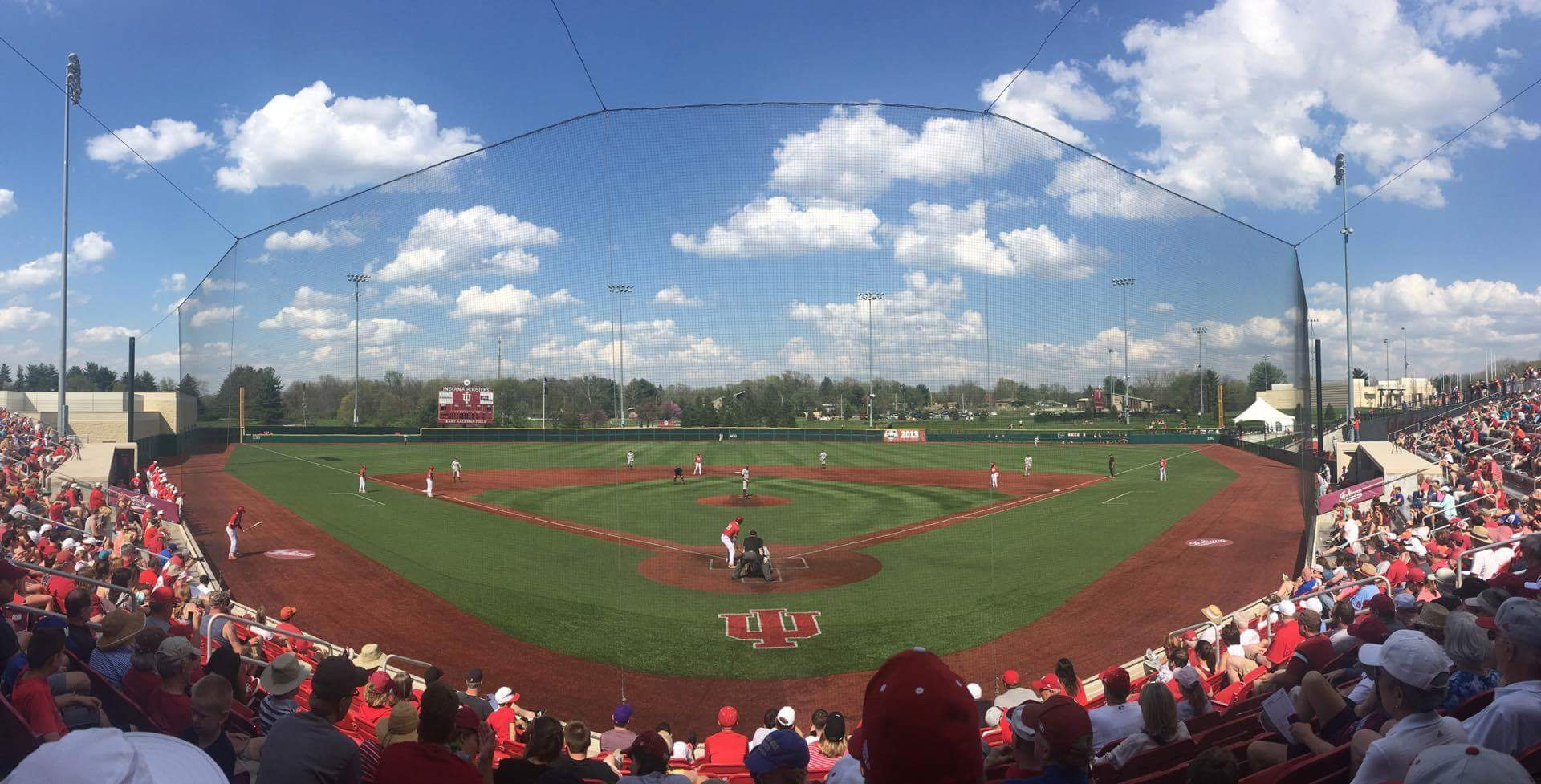
Bart Kaufman Field - 2017

== See also ==
- List of NCAA Division I baseball venues
