= 2005 College Baseball All-America Team =

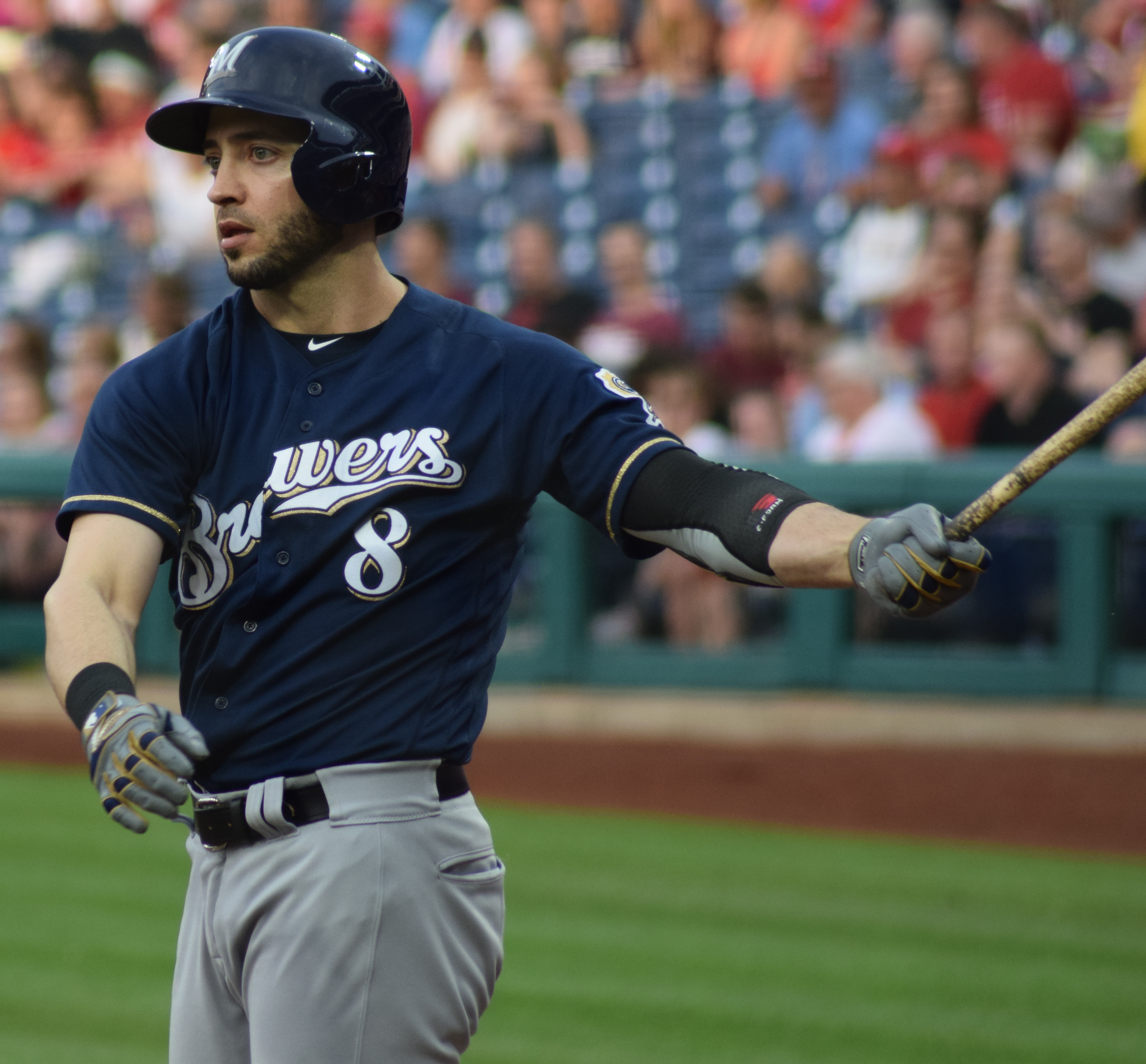
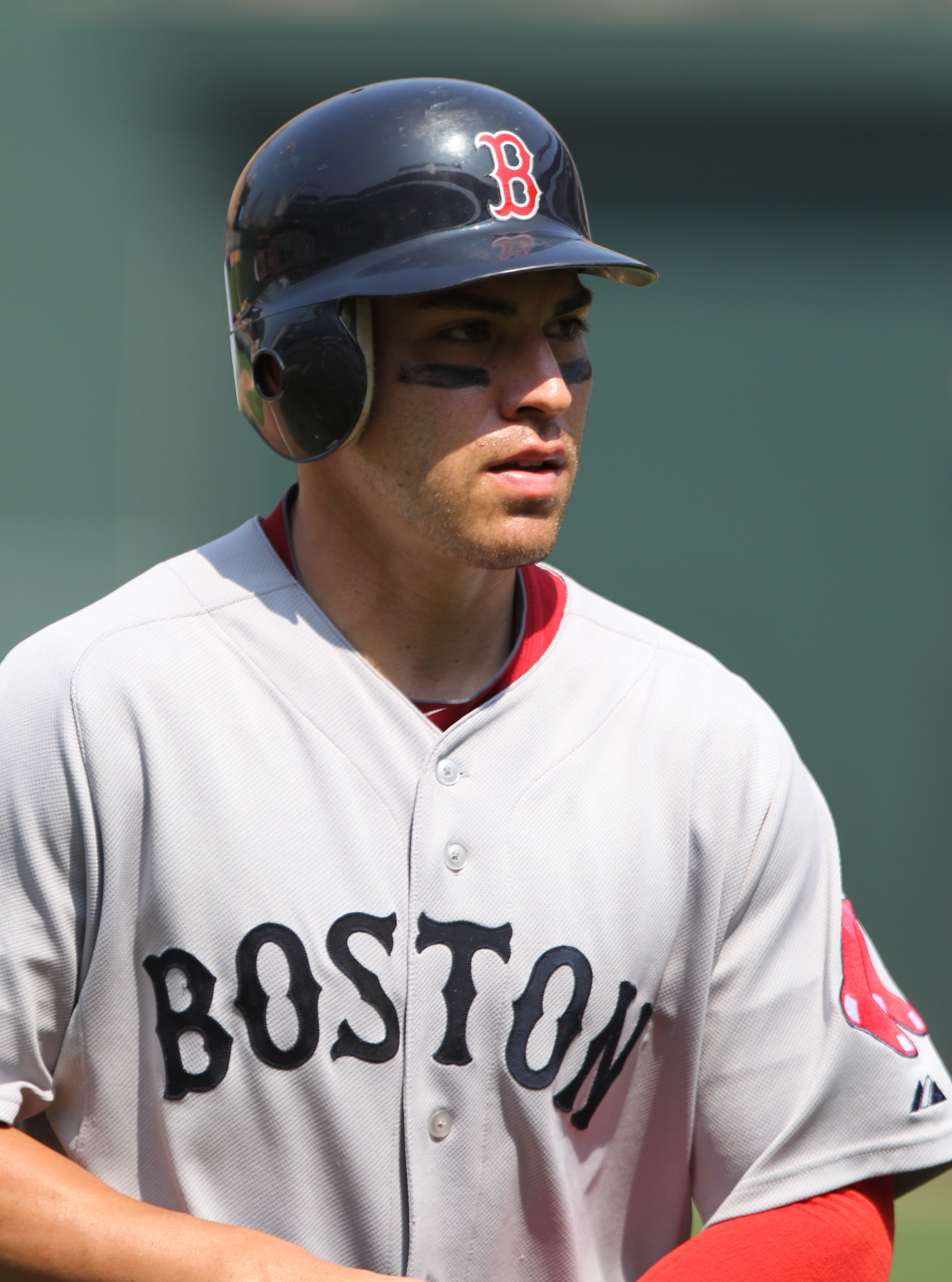
2005 All-Americans included 2011 NL MVP Ryan Braun (left) and 2011 AL All-Star Jacoby Ellsbury (right).

This is a list of college baseball players named first team All-Americans for the 2005 NCAA Division I baseball season. From 2002 to 2005, there were five generally recognized All-America selectors for baseball: the American Baseball Coaches Association, Baseball America, Collegiate Baseball Newspaper, the National Collegiate Baseball Writers Association, and USA Today Sports Weekly. In order to be considered a "consensus" All-American, a player must have been selected by at least three of these.

== Key ==
A	American Baseball Coaches Association
B	Baseball America
C	Collegiate Baseball Newspaper
N	National Collegiate Baseball Writers Association
U	USA Today Sports Weekly
	Member of the National College Baseball Hall of Fame
	Consensus All-American – selected by all five organizations
	Consensus All-American – selected by three or four organizations

== All-Americans ==
Position	Name	School	#	A	B	C	N	U	Other awards and honors
Starting pitcher	Brian Bogusevic	Tulane	1	—	—	✓	—	—	
Starting pitcher	Lance Broadway	TCU	4	✓	✓	✓	✓	—	
Starting pitcher	Dallas Buck	Oregon State	4	✓	✓	✓	—	✓	
Starting pitcher	Cesar Carillo	Miami (FL)	2	—	—	—	✓	✓	
Starting pitcher	Luke Hochevar	Tennessee	5	✓	✓	✓	✓	✓	Roger Clemens Award
Starting pitcher	Ian Kennedy	USC	3	—	✓	✓	✓	—	
Starting pitcher	Mike Pelfrey	Wichita State	3	✓	—	✓	✓	—	
Starting pitcher	Kevin Slowey	Winthrop	1	✓	—	—	—	—	
Relief pitcher	J. B. Cox	Texas	2	✓	—	—	✓	—	Stopper of the Year
Relief pitcher	Craig Hansen	St. John's	1	—	✓	—	—	—	
Relief pitcher	Neil Jamison	Long Beach State	2	—	—	✓	—	✓	
Relief pitcher	Steve Kleen	Pepperdine	1	—	—	—	✓	—	
Relief pitcher	Erik Morrison	Ball State	1	—	—	—	✓	—	
Catcher	Jeff Clement	USC	4	✓	✓	✓	—	✓	Johnny Bench Award
Catcher	Edwin Valverde	Maryland	1	—	—	—	✓	—	
First baseman	Matt LaPorta	Florida	5	✓	✓	✓	✓	✓	
Second baseman	Chris Campbell	Charleston	1	✓	—	—	—	—	
Second baseman	Jed Lowrie	Stanford	1	—	—	—	—	✓	
Second baseman	Jim Negrych	Pittsburgh	1	—	✓	—	—	—	
Second baseman	Corey Wimberley	Alcorn State	2	—	—	✓	✓	—	
Shortstop	Tyler Greene	Georgia Tech	4	—	✓	✓	✓	✓	
Shortstop	Seth Johnston	Texas	1	✓	—	—	—	—	
Third baseman	Alex Gordon	Nebraska	5	✓	✓	✓	✓	✓	Dick Howser Trophy Golden Spikes Award ABCA Player of the Year Baseball America Player of the Year Brooks Wallace Award
Outfielder	Trevor Crowe	Arizona	4	✓	✓	✓	—	✓	
Outfielder	Jacoby Ellsbury	Oregon State	3	✓	✓	—	✓	—	
Outfielder	Brett Gardner	Charleston	1	✓	—	—	—	—	
Outfielder	Ryan Patterson	LSU	2	—	—	—	✓	✓	
Outfielder	Brian Pettway	Ole Miss	2	—	—	✓	✓	—	
Outfielder	Shane Robinson	Florida State	5	✓	✓	✓	✓	✓	Collegiate Baseball Player of the Year
Designated hitter	Ryan Braun	Miami (FL)	1	—	✓	—	—	—	
Designated hitter	Chris Carlson	New Mexico	1	—	—	✓	—	—	
Designated hitter	Kris Harvey	Clemson	1	✓	—	—	—	—	
Utility player	Mike Costanzo	Coastal Carolina	3	—	✓	✓	✓	—	
Utility player	Stephen Head	Ole Miss	2	✓	—	—	—	✓	

== See also ==
- List of college baseball awards
