= Urquidez =

Urquidez is a surname. Notable people with the surname include:

- Benny Urquidez (born 1952), American kickboxer, martial arts choreographer, and actor
- Jason Urquidez (born 1982), Mexican-American baseball pitcher
