= 2005 Arizona State Sun Devils baseball team =

American college baseball season

2005 Arizona State Sun Devils baseball

NCAA Tempe Regional champions NCAA Fullerton Super Regional champions

College World Series, 3–2
- Conference: Pacific-10 Conference
- Record: 42–25 (15–9 Pac-10)
- Head coach: Pat Murphy (11th year)
- Home stadium: Packard Stadium

2005 Pacific-10 Conference baseball standings
	Conf.				Overall
Team	W		L	PCT	W		L	PCT
No. 7 Oregon State ‍†‍‍^{y}	19	–	5	.792	46	–	12	.793
No. 12 Arizona ‍‍‍^{y}	17	–	7	.708	39	–	21	.650
No. 17 Southern California ‍‍‍^{y}	15	–	9	.625	41	–	22	.651
No. 3 Arizona State ‍‍‍^{y}	15	–	9	.625	42	–	25	.627
California ‍‍‍	13	–	11	.542	34	–	23	.596
Washington ‍‍‍	12	–	12	.500	33	–	22	.600
Stanford ‍‍‍^{y}	12	–	12	.500	34	–	25	.576
UCLA ‍‍‍	4	–	20	.167	15	–	41	.268
Washington State ‍‍‍	1	–	23	.042	21	–	37	.362
† – Conference champion y – Invited to the NCAA tournament As of June 30, 2005; Rankings from Collegiate Baseball

The 2005 Arizona State Sun Devils baseball team represented Arizona State University in the 2005 NCAA Division I baseball season. The Sun Devils played their home games at Packard Stadium, and played as part of the Pacific-10 Conference. The team was coached by Pat Murphy in his eleventh season as head coach at Arizona State.

The Sun Devils reached the College World Series, their nineteenth appearance in Omaha, where they finished in third place after recording wins against Tennessee, Nebraska and eventual runner-up Florida and losing to Nebraska and Florida.

== Personnel ==
=== Roster ===
2005 Arizona State Sun Devils roster
Pitchers: - Quentin Andes - Sophomore; - Erik Averill - Junior; - Brett Bordes - Junior; - Drew Bowman - Freshman; - Pat Bresnehan - Sophomore; - Kevin Dryanski - Junior; - Seth Garrison - Freshman; - Ty Marotz - Senior; - Josh Satow - Freshman; - Jason Urquidez - Senior; - Zechry Zincola - Sophomore	Catchers: - Joel Bocchi - Senior; - Tuffy Gosewisch - Senior; - Austin Stockfisch - Freshman; Outfielders: - Travis Buck - Junior; - DJ Butler - Freshman; - Colin Curtis - Sophomore; - Rocky Laguna - Freshman; - Jeff Larish - Senior; - J.J. Sferra - Freshman; - Eric Williams - Freshman	Infielders: - Vinny Biancamano - Freshman; - Greg Bordes - Freshman; - Seth Dhaenens - Sophomore; - Willy Fox - Freshman; - Joey Hooft - Senior; - Jeff Landry - Freshman; - Joe Persichina - Sophomore; - Andrew Romine - Freshman; - Eric Sogard - Freshman

=== Coaches ===
2005 Arizona State Sun Devils baseball coaching staff
- Pat Murphy - Head coach - 11th year

== Schedule and results ==
Legend
Arizona State win
Arizona State loss

2005 Arizona State Sun Devils baseball game log
Regular season

January/February
Date	Opponent	Rank	Site/stadium	Score	Overall record	Pac-10 record
Jan 28	No. 14 Long Beach State*	No. 11	Packard Stadium • Tempe, AZ	L 3–7	0–1	
Jan 29	No. 14 Long Beach State*	No. 11	Packard Stadium • Tempe, AZ	W 8–6	1–1	
Jan 30	No. 14 Long Beach State*	No. 11	Packard Stadium • Tempe, AZ	L 1–11	1–2	
Feb 4	New Mexico State*	No. 11	Packard Stadium • Tempe, AZ	W 12–0	2–2	
Feb 5	Gonzaga*	No. 11	Packard Stadium • Tempe, AZ	W 10–8	3–2	
Feb 6	Oregon State*	No. 11	Packard Stadium • Tempe, AZ	L 6–12	3–3	
Feb 7	New Mexico State*	No. 18	Packard Stadium • Tempe, AZ	W 11–10	4–3	
Feb 12	South Alabama*	No. 18	Packard Stadium • Tempe, AZ	W 7–2	5–3	
Feb 12	Oklahoma*	No. 18	Packard Stadium • Tempe, AZ	W 7–5	6–3	
Feb 13	Gonzaga*	No. 18	Packard Stadium • Tempe, AZ	L 0–2	6–4	
Feb 15	at No. 9 Arizona*	No. 23	Frank Sancet Stadium • Tucson, AZ	L 6–7	6–5	
Feb 18	at No. 1 Tulane*	No. 23	Turchin Stadium • New Orleans, LA	L 2–8	6–6	
Feb 19	at No. 1 Tulane*	No. 23	Turchin Stadium • New Orleans, LA	L 2–7	6–7	
Feb 20	at No. 1 Tulane*	No. 23	Turchin Stadium • New Orleans, LA	L 3–9	6–8	
Feb 23	at No. 7 Arizona*		Frank Sancet Stadium • Tucson, AZ	L 5–11	6–9	
Feb 25	No. 8 Baylor*		Packard Stadium • Tempe, AZ	W 5–3	7–9	
Feb 26	No. 8 Baylor*		Packard Stadium • Tempe, AZ	W 12–4	8–9	
Feb 27	No. 8 Baylor*		Packard Stadium • Tempe, AZ	L 7–8	8–10	

March
Date	Opponent	Rank	Site/stadium	Score	Overall record	Pac-10 record
Mar 4	vs No. 4 North Carolina*		Clark–LeClair Stadium • Greenville, NC	W 4–3	9–10	
Mar 5	at East Carolina*		Clark–LeClair Stadium • Greenville, NC	W 10–3	10–10	
Mar 6	vs Ohio State*		Clark–LeClair Stadium • Greenville, NC	W 3–0	11–10	
Mar 11	at No. 5 LSU*		Alex Box Stadium • Baton Rouge, LA	L 5–6	11–11	
Mar 12	vs Western Illinois*		Alex Box Stadium • Baton Rouge, LA	W 19–1	12–11	
Mar 13	vs Western Illinois*		Alex Box Stadium • Baton Rouge, LA	W 30–13	13–11	
Mar 13	at No. 5 LSU		Alex Box Stadium • Baton Rouge, LA	L 3–20	13–12	
Mar 18	Oklahoma*		Packard Stadium • Tempe, AZ	W 5–4	14–12	
Mar 19	Oklahoma*		Packard Stadium • Tempe, AZ	W 5–1	15–12	
Mar 20	Oklahoma*		Packard Stadium • Tempe, AZ	W 6–5	16–12	
Mar 24	at No. 21 Southern California		Dedeaux Field • Los Angeles, CA	L 8–9	16–13	0–1
Mar 25	at No. 21 Southern California		Dedeaux Field • Los Angeles, CA	W 17–1	17–13	1–1
Mar 26	at No. 21 Southern California		Dedeaux Field • Los Angeles, CA	W 2–1	18–13	2–1

April
Date	Opponent	Rank	Site/stadium	Score	Overall record	Pac-10 record
Apr 1	Wright State*	No. 30	Packard Stadium • Tempe, AZ	W 13–1	19–13	
Apr 2	Wright State*	No. 30	Packard Stadium • Tempe, AZ	W 11–3	20–13	
Apr 3	Wright State*	No. 30	Packard Stadium • Tempe, AZ	W 14–1	21–13	
Apr 9	at California	No. 28	Evans Diamond • Berkeley, CA	W 11–7	22–13	3–1
Apr 9	at California	No. 28	Evans Diamond • Berkeley, CA	L 3–7	22–14	3–2
Apr 10	at California	No. 28	Evans Diamond • Berkeley, CA	L 3–4	22–15	3–3
Apr 15	No. 14 Stanford		Packard Stadium • Tempe, AZ	W 9–2	23–15	4–3
Apr 16	No. 14 Stanford		Packard Stadium • Tempe, AZ	W 6–5	24–15	5–3
Apr 17	No. 14 Stanford		Packard Stadium • Tempe, AZ	W 10–9	25–15	6–3
Apr 22	UCLA	No. 22	Packard Stadium • Tempe, AZ	W 12–5	26–15	7–3
Apr 23	UCLA	No. 22	Packard Stadium • Tempe, AZ	W 16–2	27–15	8–3
Apr 24	UCLA	No. 22	Packard Stadium • Tempe, AZ	W 10–8	28–15	9–3
Apr 29	at No. 6 Oregon State	No. 17	Goss Stadium at Coleman Field • Corvallis, OR	L 5–6	28–16	9–4
Apr 30	at No. 6 Oregon State	No. 17	Goss Stadium at Coleman Field • Corvallis, OR	W 3–1	29–16	10–4

May
Date	Opponent	Rank	Site/stadium	Score	Overall record	Pac-10 record
May 1	at No. 6 Oregon State	No. 17	Goss Stadium at Coleman Field • Corvallis, OR	L 1–5	29–17	10–5
May 4	Utah Valley State*	No. 17	Packard Stadium • Tempe, AZ	L 6–9	29–18	
May 14	No. 7 Arizona	No. 17	Packard Stadium • Tempe, AZ	W 6–1	30–18	11–5
May 15	No. 7 Arizona	No. 17	Packard Stadium • Tempe, AZ	L 7–16	30–19	11–6
May 16	No. 7 Arizona	No. 18	Packard Stadium • Tempe, AZ	L 1–18	30–20	11–7
May 20	at Washington	No. 18	Husky Ballpark • Seattle, WA	L 4–6	30–21	11–8
May 21	at Washington	No. 18	Husky Ballpark • Seattle, WA	L 3–5	30–22	11–9
May 22	at Washington	No. 18	Husky Ballpark • Seattle, WA	W 2–1	31–22	12–9
May 27	Washington State	No. 22	Packard Stadium • Tempe, AZ	W 8–2	32–22	13–9
May 28	Washington State	No. 22	Packard Stadium • Tempe, AZ	W 16–6	33–22	14–9
May 29	Washington State	No. 22	Packard Stadium • Tempe, AZ	W 7–2	34–22	15–9

Postseason

NCAA Tempe Regional
Date	Opponent	Seed	Site/stadium	Score	Overall record	Reg Record
June 3	(3) East Carolina	No. 20 (2)	Packard Stadium • Tempe, AZ	W 9–6	35–22	1–0
June 4	(1) Coastal Carolina	No. 20 (2)	Packard Stadium • Tempe, AZ	W 11–3	36–22	2–0
June 5	(1) Coastal Carolina	No. 20 (2)	Packard Stadium • Tempe, AZ	W 9–5	37–22	3–0

NCAA Fullerton Super Regional
Date	Opponent	Seed	Site/stadium	Score	Overall record	SR Record
June 10	(6) Cal State Fullerton	No. 17	Goodwin Field • Fullerton, CA	L 2–3	37–23	0–1
June 11	(6) Cal State Fullerton	No. 17	Goodwin Field • Fullerton, CA	W 6–2	38–23	1–1
June 12	(6) Cal State Fullerton	No. 17	Goodwin Field • Fullerton, CA	W 9–8	39–23	2–1

College World Series
Date	Opponent	Seed	Site/stadium	Score	Overall record	CWS record
June 17	(3) Nebraska	No. 8	Johnny Rosenblatt Stadium • Omaha, NE	L 3–5	39–24	0–1
June 19	Tennessee	No. 8	Johnny Rosenblatt Stadium • Omaha, NE	W 4–2	40–24	1–1
June 21	(3) Nebraska	No. 8	Johnny Rosenblatt Stadium • Omaha, NE	W 8–7	41–24	2–1
June 22	(7) Florida	No. 8	Johnny Rosenblatt Stadium • Omaha, NE	W 6–1	42–24	3–1
June 23	(7) Florida	No. 8	Johnny Rosenblatt Stadium • Omaha, NE	L 3–6	42–25	3–2
