= 2005 NCAA Division I baseball rankings =

- Duration: January 21 – June 26, 2005
- Number of teams: 290
- Preseason No. 1: Texas (CB, NCBWA)

Tournament
- Duration: June 3–26, 2005
- Most conference bids: SEC (9)

College World Series
- Duration: June 17–26, 2005
- Champions: Texas (6th title)
- Runners-up: Florida
- MOP: David Maroul

Seasons
- ← 2004 2006 →

The following polls make up the 2005 NCAA Division I baseball rankings. USA Today and ESPN began publishing the Coaches' Poll of 31 active coaches ranking the top 25 teams in the nation in 1992. Each coach is a member of the American Baseball Coaches Association. Baseball America began publishing its poll of the top 20 teams in college baseball in 1981. Beginning with the 1985 season, it expanded to the top 25. Collegiate Baseball Newspaper published its first human poll of the top 20 teams in college baseball in 1957, and expanded to rank the top 30 teams in 1961.

== Legend ==
	Increase in ranking
	Decrease in ranking
	Not ranked previous week
Italics	Number of first place votes
(#-#)	Win–loss record
т	Tied with team above or below also with this symbol

== USA Today/ESPN Coaches' Poll ==
	Preseason Jan 17	Week 1 Feb 7	Week 2 Feb 14	Week 3 Feb 21	Week 4 Feb 28	Week 5 Mar 7	Week 6 Mar 14	Week 7 Mar 21	Week 8 Mar 28	Week 9 Apr 4	Week 10 Apr 11	Week 11 Apr 18	Week 12 Apr 25	Week 13 May 2	Week 14 May 9	Week 15 May 16	Week 16 May 23	Week 17 May 30	Final June 28	
1.	Texas (15)	Texas (3-0)	Texas (7-0)	Texas (11-0)	Texas (15-0)	Texas (17-1)	Texas (21-1)	Cal State Fullerton (16-4)	Texas (23-4)	Texas (26-5)	Texas (29-6)	Texas (32-6)	Texas (35-7)	Tulane (38-8)	Tulane (42-8)	Tulane (45-8)	Tulane (47-9)	Tulane (50-9)	Texas (56-16)	1.
2.	Cal State Fullerton (16)	Cal State Fullerton (2-1)	Cal State Fullerton (4-1)	LSU (7-0)	LSU (9-1)	Tulane (13-1)	Cal State Fullerton (14-3)	Tulane (19-3)	Cal State Fullerton (17-6)	Cal State Fullerton (20-7)	Cal State Fullerton (23-8)	Cal State Fullerton (26-9)	Tulane (35-7)	Texas (37-9)	Cal State Fullerton (36-12)	Cal State Fullerton (37-12)	Cal State Fullerton (40-13)	Oregon State (41-9)	Florida (48-23)	2.
3.	Miami (FL) (1)	LSU (0-0)	LSU (2-0)	Cal State Fullerton (5-1)	Tulane (9-1)	Cal State Fullerton (11-2)	South Carolina (15-1)	LSU (17-4)	Tulane (21-5)	Tulane (25-5)	Tulane (29-5)	Tulane (32-6)	Cal State Fullerton (30-11)	Cal State Fullerton (33-11)	Miami (FL) (36-11-1)	Texas (41-11)	Texas (43-12)	Cal State Fullerton (41-15)	Tulane (56-12)	3.
4.	LSU (2)	Miami (FL) (4-0)	Miami (FL) (7-0)	Tulane (7-0)	Cal State Fullerton (7-2)	South Carolina (12-1)	Tulane (15-3)	Texas (21-4)	Georgia Tech (21-4)	South Carolina (24-5)	South Carolina (28-5)	Georgia Tech (29-7)	Miami (FL) (31-10-1)	Miami (FL) (33-11-1)	Texas (39-11)	Miami (FL) (38-12-1)	Oregon State (41-9)	Nebraska (51-13)	Baylor (46-24)	4.
5.	Tulane (6)	Tulane (0-0)	Tulane (3-0)	South Carolina (6-0)	South Carolina (9-0)	LSU (11-3)	LSU (14-4)	Arkansas (18-2)	LSU (19-6)	Georgia Tech (23-6)	Georgia Tech (26-7)	Miami (FL) (29-9-1)	Florida (30-10)	Nebraska (37-9)	Nebraska (39-10)	Oregon State (39-8)	Nebraska (46-12)	Texas (45-14)	Nebraska (57-15)	5.
6.	Stanford	South Carolina (0-0)	Stanford (7-2)	Miami (FL) (8-2)	Miami (FL) (10-3)	Miami (FL) (13-4)	Miami (FL) (17-4)	South Carolina (17-3)	Miami (FL) (22-7)	LSU (21-8)	Miami (FL) (27-9)	Arizona (26-11)	Nebraska (34-8)	Georgia Tech (32-12)	Oregon State (36-8)	Georgia Tech (37-14)	LSU (38-18)	Georgia Tech (42-16)	Arizona State (42-25)	6.
7.	South Carolina	Stanford (4-2)	South Carolina (3-0)	Arizona (9-1)	Rice (10-2)	Rice (12-3)	Rice (14-5)	Miami (FL) (20-5)	Ole Miss (19-5)	Miami (FL) (24-9)	North Carolina (27-6)	Florida (27-9)	North Carolina (33-8)	Florida (31-12)	Georgia Tech (34-13)	Nebraska (41-12)	Arizona (36-17)	Rice (41-17)	Oregon State (46-12)	7.
8.	Georgia	Georgia (0-0)	Georgia (0-0)	Georgia (3-0)	Georgia (5-1)	Florida State (19-1)	Arkansas (16-1)	Georgia Tech (19-2)	South Carolina (19-5)	North Carolina (24-5)	Arizona (24-10)	South Carolina (29-8)	Georgia Tech (30-10)	LSU (31-14)	North Carolina (36-10)	Arizona (33-16)	Miami (FL) (38-15-1)	Florida (40-20)	Tennessee (46-21)	8.
9.	Arizona State	Texas A&M (0-0)	Arizona (6-0)	Rice (7-1)	Florida State (15-1)	Arizona (12-5)	Georgia Tech (16-2)	Ole Miss (17-4)	Arkansas (21-4)	Arizona (21-10)	Florida (25-8)	Nebraska (31-7)	LSU (29-13)	North Carolina (36-10)	Arizona (32-15)	LSU (35-17)	Georgia Tech (38-16)	Arizona (37-19)	Cal State Fullerton (46-18)	9.
10.	Texas A&M	Arizona (3-0)	Rice (3-1)	Stanford (7-5)	North Carolina (8-0)	Stanford (11-7)	Arizona (14-6)	Stanford (12-7)	Florida State (27-5)	Nebraska (25-3)	Arkansas (27-6)	North Carolina (28-8)	Arizona (27-14)	Oregon State (32-8)	Florida (32-15)	Florida State (46-14)	Florida (38-18)	Baylor (39-21)	Ole Miss (48-20)	10.
11.	North Carolina	Washington (0-0)	Florida State (8-1)	Florida State (11-1)	Stanford (9-6)	Arkansas (12-1)	Texas A&M (15-5)	Baylor (15-7)	Stanford (14-8)	Stanford (17-9)	Nebraska (27-6)	Arkansas (30-8)	Oregon State (30-7)	Arizona (29-15)	LSU (33-16)	Rice (36-15)	Rice (38-17)	Ole Miss (44-18)	Georgia Tech (45-19)	11.
12.	Arizona	Long Beach State (5-1)	Baylor (3-0)	North Carolina (4-0)	Arizona (11-3)	Vanderbilt (10-0)	Stanford (11-7)	Florida State (24-4)	Arizona (18-10)	Florida (23-7)	LSU (23-11)	LSU (26-12)	Long Beach State (29-14)	Long Beach State (32-14)	Baylor (31-17)	Baylor (34-18)	North Carolina (40-15)	LSU (38-20)	Arizona (39-21)	12.
13.	Washington	Arizona State (3-3)	North Carolina (0-0)	Florida (5-2)	Florida (8-2)	Georgia Tech (11-2)	Florida (15-4)	Arizona (16-9)	North Carolina (20-5)	Ole Miss (21-7)	Florida State (32-8)	Long Beach State (27-12)	South Carolina (30-11)	South Carolina (32-12)	Rice (32-15)	Florida (34-18)	Florida State (48-16)	Miami (FL) (38-17-1)	Rice (45-19)	13.
14.	Rice	Rice (1-0)	Long Beach State (5-3)	Baylor (5-2)	Arkansas (9-1)	Georgia (7-3)	North Carolina (11-3)	Rice (15-8)	Rice (18-9)	Florida State (29-7)	Stanford (19-11)	Baylor (25-13)	Rice (29-14)	Rice (32-15)	Florida State (41-14)	Long Beach State (35-17)	Baylor (36-20)	Florida State (50-18)	Clemson (43-23)	14.
15.	Georgia Tech	Georgia Tech (0-0)	Ole Miss (0-0)	Ole Miss (3-1)	Vanderbilt (6-0)	Texas A&M (12-4)	Ole Miss (13-3)	Texas A&M (17-7)	Florida (19-7)	Rice (21-10)	Oregon State (26-5)	Rice (26-13)	Arkansas (31-11)	Baylor (30-17)	Long Beach State (33-16)	North Carolina (37-14)	Ole Miss (40-16)	North Carolina (40-17)	Miami (FL) (41-19-1)	15.
16.	Long Beach State	Florida (0-0)	Georgia Tech (2-1)	Texas A&M (5-2)	Georgia Tech (7-2)	Florida (11-3)	Florida State (21-4)	Nebraska (18-2)	Nebraska (21-3)	Arkansas (22-6)	Baylor (22-12)	Oregon State (27-7)	Baylor (27-16)	Louisiana-Lafayette (38-9)	Louisiana-Lafayette (41-11)	Louisiana-Lafayette (44-12)	Long Beach State (36-19)	Long Beach State (36-20)	Florida State (53-20)	16.
17.	Florida	North Carolina (0-0)	Texas A&M (1-2)	Georgia Tech (5-1)	Ole Miss (5-2)	North Carolina (9-3)	Louisiana-Lafayette (17-2)	North Carolina (15-5)	Baylor (16-10)	Baylor (19-11)	Long Beach State (24-11)	Florida State (33-11)	Louisiana-Lafayette (35-8)	Florida State (37-14)	Tennessee (35-14)	Ole Miss (37-16)	Tennessee (39-17)	Tennessee (41-19)	USC (41-22)	17.
18.	Ole Miss	Ole Miss (0-0)	Arizona State (6-4)	USC (4-0)	USC (5-2)	Ole Miss (9-3)	Georgia (10-5)	Florida (16-6)	Mississippi State (17-4)	Texas A&M (22-10)	Rice (23-12)	Louisiana-Lafayette (32-7)	Stanford (24-14)	Ole Miss (32-13)	Arkansas (35-14)	Arkansas (37-15)	Louisiana-Lafayette (45-15)	USC (37-19)	LSU (40-22)	18.
19.	Florida State	Florida State (6-0)	Florida (2-1)	Notre Dame (3-1)	Baylor (6-4)	Wichita State (15-1)	Baylor (11-7)	Texas Tech (17-6)	Texas A&M (19-9)	Long Beach State (21-10)	Louisiana-Lafayette (29-6)	Stanford (20-14)	Florida State (35-13)	Arkansas (33-13)	Ole Miss (35-15)	Tennessee (36-16)	Clemson (37-19)	Clemson (39-21)	Long Beach State (37-22)	19.
20.	Notre Dame	Baylor (0-0)	Southern California (3-0)	Vanderbilt (2-0)	Texas A&M (7-4)	USC (7-4)	Vanderbilt (12-3)	Louisiana-Lafayette (19-4)	Louisiana-Lafayette (22-5)	Louisiana-Lafayette (25-6)	Ole Miss (22-10)	Arizona State (25-15)	Arizona State (28-15)	Alabama (32-14)	South Carolina (32-16)	USC (32-15)	South Carolina (37-19)	Louisiana-Lafayette (47-17)	Alabama (40-23)	20.
21.	Baylor	Vanderbilt (0-0)	Vanderbilt (0-0)	Arkansas (6-1)	Nebraska (7-0)	Texas Tech (14-2)	Nebraska (12-2)	USC (13-6)	Auburn (19-8)	Auburn (21-10)	Missouri (26-6)	Ole Miss (24-12)	USC (26-12)	Stanford (24-15)	Stanford (27-16)	Arizona State (30-19)	USC (34-18)	Mississippi State (40-20)	Missouri (40-23)	21.
22.	Vanderbilt	Notre Dame (0-0)	Notre Dame (0-0)	Long Beach State (5-6)	Texas Tech (11-1)	Nebraska (8-2)	Wichita State (16-3)	Wichita State (19-5)	Wichita State (22-6)	Vanderbilt (20-7)	Alabama (24-10)	USC (22-10)	Ole Miss (27-13)	Arizona State (29-17)	Alabama (34-16)	Stanford (29-19)	Charlotte (44-11)	Charlotte (47-13)	Mississippi State (42-22)	22.
23.	Clemson	Clemson (0-0)	Arkansas (4-0)	TCU (5-2)	TCU (7-3)	Baylor (8-6)	USC (9-6)	Oregon State (16-3)	Vanderbilt (17-6)	Oregon State (24-4)	USC (21-9)	Alabama (26-12)	Alabama (29-13)	Tennessee (32-14)	USC (28-15)	South Carolina (34-19)	NC State (39-15)	South Carolina (38-21)	Coastal Carolina (50-16)	23.
24.	Arkansas	TCU (0-0)	Clemson (0-0)	UC Irvine (6-2)	Wichita State (11-0)	Louisiana–Lafayette (14-1)	Texas Tech (15-5)	Mississippi State (13-3)	Long Beach State (18-10)	Alabama (22-9)	Mississippi State (20-8)	Missouri (27-9)	Missouri (30-10)	USC (27-15)	Arizona State (29-18)	Charlotte (41-10)	Alabama (37-19)	Arizona State (34-22)	Pepperdine (41-23)	24.
25.	TCU	Arkansas (0-0)	TCU (3-0)	Washington (1-4)	Long Beach State (8-6)	TCU (10-3)	TCU (12-5)	Vanderbilt (14-5)	Texas Tech (17-8)	Arizona State (21-13)	Auburn (22-13)	Tennessee (25-10)	Vanderbilt (27-12)	Missouri (31-13)	Charlotte (38-9)	Alabama (35-18)	Stanford (31-21)	NC State (40-17)	South Carolina (41-23)	25.
	Preseason Jan 17	Week 1 Feb 7	Week 2 Feb 14	Week 3 Feb 21	Week 4 Feb 28	Week 5 Mar 7	Week 6 Mar 14	Week 7 Mar 21	Week 8 Mar 28	Week 9 Apr 4	Week 10 Apr 11	Week 11 Apr 18	Week 12 Apr 25	Week 13 May 2	Week 14 May 9	Week 15 May 16	Week 16 May 23	Week 17 May 30	Final June 28	
		None	Dropped: 11 Washington	Dropped: 18 Arizona State; 24 Clemson	Dropped: 19 Notre Dame; 24 UC Irvine; 25 Washington	Dropped: 25 Long Beach State	None	Dropped: 18 Georgia; 25 TCU	Dropped: 21 USC; 23 Oregon State	Dropped: 18 Mississippi State; 22 Wichita State; 25 Texas Tech	Dropped: 18 Texas A&M; 22 Vanderbilt; 25 Arizona State	Dropped: 24 Mississippi State; 25 Auburn	Dropped: 25 Tennessee	Dropped: 25 Vanderbilt	Dropped: 25 Missouri	None	Dropped: 18 Arkansas; 21 Arizona State	Dropped: 24 Alabama; 25 Stanford	Dropped: 15 North Carolina; 20 Louisiana-Lafayette; 22 Charlotte; 25 NC State	

== Baseball America ==
Currently, only the final poll from the 2005 season is available.

Rank	Team
1	Texas
2	Florida
3	Tulane
4	Baylor
5	Nebraska
6	Arizona State
7	Oregon State
8	Tennessee
9	Cal State Fullerton
10	Ole Miss
11	Georgia Tech
12	Arizona
13	Rice
14	Clemson
15	Miami (FL)
16	Florida State
17	Southern California
18	LSU
19	Long Beach State
20	Alabama
21	Missouri
22	Mississippi State
23	Coastal Carolina
24	Pepperdine
25	South Carolina

== Collegiate Baseball ==
	Preseason Dec 22	Week 1 Feb 7	Week 2 Feb 14	Week 3 Feb 21	Week 4 Feb 28	Week 5 Mar 7	Week 6 Mar 14	Week 7 Mar 21	Week 8 Mar 28	Week 9 Apr 4	Week 10 Apr 11	Week 11 Apr 18	Week 12 Apr 25	Week 13 May 2	Week 14 May 9	Week 15 May 16	Week 16 May 23	Week 17 May 30	Week 18 June 7	Week 19 June 13	Week 20 June 28	
1.	Texas	Texas (3–0)	Texas (7–0)	Texas (11–0)	Texas (15–0)	Texas (17–1)	Texas (21–1)	Cal State Fullerton (16–4)	Georgia Tech (21–4)	Cal State Fullerton (20–7)	Tulane (29–5)	Tulane (32–6)	Tulane (35–7)	Tulane (38–8)	Tulane (42–8)	Tulane (45–8)	Tulane (47–9)	Tulane (50–9)	Tulane (53–9)	Tulane (55–10)	Texas (56–16)	1.
2.	Miami (FL)	Miami (FL) (4–0)	Miami (FL) (7–0)	Tulane (7–0)	Tulane (9–1)	Tulane (13–1)	South Carolina (15–1)	Tulane (19–3)	Cal State Fullerton (17–6)	Tulane (25–5)	Cal State Fullerton (23–8)	Cal State Fullerton (26–9)	Texas (35–7)	Cal State Fullerton (33–11)	Cal State Fullerton (26–12)	Cal State Fullerton (37–12)	Cal State Fullerton (40–13)	Cal State Fullerton (41–15)	Cal State Fullerton (45–16)	Oregon State (46–10)	Florida (48–23)	2.
3.	Cal State Fullerton	Cal State Fullerton (2–1)	Cal State Fullerton (4–1)	LSU (7–0)	LSU (9–1)	Florida State (19–1)	Cal State Fullerton (14–3)	LSU (17–4)	Tulane (21–5)	Georgia Tech (23–6)	Texas (29–6)	Texas (32–6)	Florida (30–10)	Texas (37–9)	Nebraska (39–10)	Oregon State (39–8)	Oregon State (41–9)	Oregon State (41–9)	Oregon State (44–9)	Nebraska (56–13)	Arizona State (42–25)	3.
4.	Tulane	Tulane (0–0)	Tulane (3–0)	North Carolina (4–0)	North Carolina (8–0)	South Carolina (12–1)	Tulane (15–3)	Georgia Tech (19–2)	LSU (19–6)	Nebraska (25–3)	Georgia Tech (26–7)	Georgia Tech (29–7)	Cal State Fullerton (30–11)	Florida (31–120	Texas (39–11)	Texas (41–11)	Nebraska (46–12)	Nebraska (51–13)	Nebraska (54–13)	Baylor (44–22)	Baylor (46–24)	4.
5.	LSU	LSU (0–0)	LSU (2–0)	South Carolina (6–0)	South Carolina (9–0)	Cal State Fullerton (11–2)	LSU (14–4)	Arkansas (18–2)	Texas (23–4)	Texas (26–5)	South Carolina (28–5)	Arizona (26–11)	Nebraska (34–8)	Nebraska (37–9)	Georgia Tech (34–13)	Nebraska (41–12)	Texas (43–12)	Georgia Tech (42–16)	Georgia Tech (45–17)	Texas (51–16)	Tulane (56–12)	5.
6.	Stanford	Stanford (4–2)	Stanford (7–2)	Cal State Fullerton (5–1)	Cal State Fullerton (7–2)	LSU (11–3)	Georgia Tech (16–2)	South Carolina (17–3)	Florida State (27–5)	Florida (23–7)	Arizona (24–10)	Florida (27–9)	Georgia Tech (30–10)	Georgia Tech (32–12)	Miami (FL) (36–11–1)	Georgia Tech (37–14)	Arizona (36–17)	Baylor (39–21)	Baylor (42–21)	Florida (45–20)	Nebraska (57–15)	6.
7.	North Carolina	North Carolina (0–0)	North Carolina (0–0)	Rice (7–1)	Rice (10–2)	Rice (12–3)	Arkansas (16–1)	Texas (21–4)	Nebraska (21–3)	North Carolina (24–5)	Florida (25–8)	Nebraska (31–7)	Miami (FL) (31–10–1)	Miami (FL) (33–11–1)	Arizona (32–15)	Miami (FL) (38–12–1)	Florida (38–18)	Texas (45–14)	Texas (49–15)	Tennessee (46–19)	Oregon State (46–12)	7.
8.	South Carolina	South Carolina (0–0)	South Carolina (3–0)	Miami (FL) (8–2)	Florida State (15–1)	Georgia Tech (11–2)	Rice (14–5)	Florida State (24–4)	Arkansas (21–4)	Florida State (29–7)	North Carolina (27–6)	Miami (FL) (29–9–1)	Arizona (27–14)	Arizona (29–15)	Oregon State (36–8)	Baylor (34–18)	Tennessee (39–17)	Florida (40–20)	Florida (43–20)	Arizona State (39–23)	Tennessee (46–21)	8.
9.	Georgia	Georgia (0–0)	Georgia (0–0)	Georgia (3–0)	Georgia (5–1)	Wichita State (15–1)	North Carolina (11–3)	Nebraska (18–2)	Florida (19–7)	LSU (21–8)	Florida State (32–8)	Long Beach State (27–12)	Oregon State (30–7)	Oregon State (32–8)	Baylor (31–17)	Arizona (33–16)	Georgia Tech (38–16)	Arizona (37–19)	Ole Miss (47–18)	Cal State Fullerton (46–18)	Cal State Fullerton (46–18)	9.
10.	Texas A&M	Texas A&M (0–0)	Arizona (6–0)	Arizona (9–1)	Florida (8–2)	Arkansas (12–1)	Florida (15–4)	Miami (FL) (20–5)	South Carolina (19–5)	South Carolina (24–5)	Nebraska (27–6)	Baylor (25–13)	North Carolina (33–8–1)	Long Beach State (32–14)	Tennessee (35–14)	Florida State (46–14)	Baylor (36–20)	Tennessee (41–19)	Tennessee (44–19)	Georgia Tech (45–19)	Georgia Tech (45–19)	10.
11.	Arizona State	Arizona (3–0)	Rice (3–1)	Stanford (7–5)	Miami (FL) (10–3)	North Carolina (9–3)	Miami (FL) (17–4)	North Carolina (15–5)	North Carolina (20–5)	Arizona (21–10)	Oregon State (26–5)	Oregon State (27–7)	Long Beach State (29–14)	Baylor (30–17)	Florida State (41–14)	Tennessee (36–16)	LSU (38–18)	Ole Miss (44–18)	Arizona (39–21)	Ole Miss (48–20)	Ole Miss (48–20)	11.
12.	Arizona	Long Beach State (5–1)	Texas A&M (1–2)	Texas A&M (5–2)	Stanford (9–6)	Georgia (7–3)	Texas A&M (15–5)	Florida (16–6)	Miami (FL) (22–7)	Stanford (17–9)	Miami (FL) (27–9)	North Carolina (28–8–1)	Baylor (27–16)	Alabama (32–14)	Florida (32–15)	Florida (34–18)	Clemson (37–19)	Clemson (39–21)	Clemson (42–21)	Arizona (39–21)	Arizona (39–21)	12.
13.	Georgia Tech	Georgia Tech (0–0)	Baylor (3–0)	Georgia Tech (5–1)	Georgia Tech (7–2)	Florida (11–3)	Arizona (14–6)	Baylor (15–7)	Arizona (18–10)	Long Beach State (21–10)	Missouri (26–6)	South Carolina (29–8)	Alabama (29–13)	LSU (31–14)	Long Beach State (33–16)	Long Beach State (35–17)	Miami (FL) (38–15–1)	Miami (FL) (38–17–1)	Miami (FL) (41–17–1)	Clemson (43–23)	Clemson (43–23)	13.
14.	Long Beach State	Rice (1–0)	Georgia Tech (2–1)	Florida State (11–1)	Arizona (11–3)	Miami (FL) (13–4)	Wichita State (16–3)	Stanford (12–7)	Mississippi State (17–4)	Miami (FL) (24–9)	Long Beach State (24–11)	Florida State (33–11)	LSU (29–13)	North Carolina (36–10–1)	North Carolina (36–10–1)	LSU (35–17)	Florida State (48–16)	Florida State (50–18)	Florida State (53–18)	Miami (FL) (41–19–1)	Miami (FL) (41–19–1)	14.
15.	Rice	Florida State (6–0)	Florida State (8–1)	Southern California (4–0)	Wichita State (11–0)	Stanford (11–7)	Stanford (11–7)	Texas A&M (17–7)	Ole Miss (19–5)	Oregon State (24–4)	Arkansas (27–6)	Alabama (26–12)	Florida State (35–13)	Florida State (37–14)	Alabama (34–16)	Rice (36–15)	Long Beach State (36–19)	Long Beach State (36–20)	Rice (44–17)	Florida State (53–20)	Florida State (53–20)	15.
16.	Ole Miss	Ole Miss (0–0)	Ole Miss (0–0)	Baylor (5–2)	Arkansas (9–1)	Arizona (12–5)	Florida State (21–4)	Arizona (16–9)	Stanford (14–8)	Auburn (21–10)	Baylor (22–12)	Tennessee (25–10)	Missouri (30–10)	Tennessee (32–14)	LSU (33–16)	Alabama (35–18)	Ole Miss (40–16)	LSU (38–20)	Southern California (40–20)	Rice (45–19)	Rice (45–19)	16.
17.	Washington	Washington (0–0)	UC Irvine (5–1)	Ole Miss (3–1)	Texas A&M (7–4)	Texas A&M (12–4)	Georgia (10–5)	Mississippi State (13–3)	Louisiana–Lafayette (22–5)	Arkansas (22–6)	Alabama (24–10)	Arkansas (30–8)	Arizona State (28–15)	Arizona State (29–17)	Arizona State (29–18)	Southern California (32–15)	Alabama (37–19)	Rice (41–17)	Arizona State (37–22)	Southern California (41–22)	Southern California (41–22)	17.
18.	Florida State	Arizona State (3–3)	Southern California (3–0)	Florida (5–2)	Nebraska (7–0)	Mississippi State (6–0)	Mississippi State (9–2)	Ole Miss (17–4)	UCF (25–5)	College of Charleston (23–4)	Stanford (19–11)	LSU (26–12)	South Carolina (30–11)	South Carolina (32–12)	Louisiana–Lafayette (41–11)	Arizona State (30–19)	Rice (38–17)	Alabama (38–21)	Long Beach State (37–22)	Long Beach State (37–22)	Long Beach State (37–22)	18.
19.	Mississippi State	Mississippi State (0–0)	Mississippi State (0–0)	Mississippi State (0–0)	Mississippi State (2–0)	Louisiana–Lafayette (14–1)	Louisiana–Lafayette (17–2)	Louisiana–Lafayette (19–4)	Michigan (15–3)	Missouri (23–5)	LSU (23–11)	Missouri (27–9)	Tennessee (28–12)	Louisiana–Lafayette (38–9)	Cal Poly (31–16)	Louisiana–Lafayette (44–12)	North Carolina (40–15–1)	Southern California (37–19)	LSU (40–22)	LSU (40–22)	LSU (40–22)	19.
20.	Notre Dame	Notre Dame (0–0)	Notre Dame (0–0)	UC Irvine (6–2)	Ole Miss (5–2)	Vanderbilt (10–0)	Ole Miss (13–3)	UCF (23–4)	Long Beach State (18–10)	Louisiana–Lafayette (25–6)	College of Charleston (26–5)	College of Charleston (29–6)	Southern California (26–12)	Cal Poly (30–14)	College of Charleston (38–9)	College of Charleston (41–10)	College of Charleston (44–11)	Arizona State (34–22)	Alabama (40–23)	Alabama (40–23)	Alabama (40–23)	20.
21.	Clemson	Clemson (0–0)	Clemson (0–0)	Notre Dame (3–1)	Southern California (5–2)	Ole Miss (9–3)	Nebraska (12–2)	Wichita State (19–5)	Wichita State (22–6)	Baylor (19–11)	Louisiana–Lafayette (29–6)	Louisiana–Lafayette (32–7)	Louisiana–Lafayette (35–8)	Missouri (31–13)	Southern California (28–15)	Ole Miss (37–16)	Southern California (34–18)	North Carolina (40–17–1)	North Carolina (41–19–1)	North Carolina (41–19–1)	North Carolina (41–19–1)	21.
22.	Florida	Florida (0–0)	Long Beach State (5–3)	Wichita State (6–0)	Louisiana–Lafayette (10–0)	Southern California (7–4)	UCF (19–3)	Michigan (11–3)	Baylor (16–10)	Alabama (22–9)	Mississippi State (20–8)	Arizona State (25–15)	Stanford (24–14)	Southern California (27–15)	Stanford (27–16)	Arkansas (37–15)	Arizona State (31–22)	College of Charleston (47–13)	College of Charleston (48–15)	College of Charleston (48–15)	College of Charleston (48–15)	22.
23.	Oklahoma State	Oklahoma State (3–0)	Arizona State (6–4)	Arkansas (6–1)	Coastal Carolina (7–1)	Nebraska (8–2)	Michigan (8–3)	Southern California (13–6)	Rice (18–9)	Ole Miss (21–7)	Auburn (22–13)	Auburn (25–14)	Arkansas (31–11)	Stanford (24–15)	Rice (32–15)	Coastal Carolina (42–11)	Louisiana–Lafayette (45–15)	Louisiana–Lafayette (47–17)	Pepperdine (41–23)	Pepperdine (41–23)	Pepperdine (41–23)	23.
24.	UCF	UCF (2–0)	Arkansas (4–0)	Winthrop (8–1)	Clemson (4–2)	Michigan (5–2)	Southern California (9–6)	Rice (15–8)	Texas A&M (19–9)	Mississippi State (17–7)	Tennessee (23–9)	Southern California (22–10)	Cal Poly (27–14)	Rice (32–15)	TCU (34–15)	Clemson (33–19)	Coastal Carolina (44–12)	Coastal Carolina (48–14)	Louisiana–Lafayette (48–19)	Louisiana–Lafayette (48–19)	Louisiana–Lafayette (48–19)	24.
25.	Baylor	Baylor (0–0)	Wichita State (3–0)	Oklahoma State (7–3)	Baylor (6–4)	Coastal Carolina (10–2)	Tennessee (14–3)	Coastal Carolina (17–3)	Coastal Carolina (21–4)	UCF (27–7)	Southern California (21–9)	UCF (35–8)	UCF (35–9)	Ole Miss (32–13)	Ole Miss (35–15)	North Carolina (37–14–1)	South Carolina (37–19)	South Carolina (38–21)	Coastal Carolina (50–16)	Coastal Carolina (50–16)	Coastal Carolina (50–16)	25.
26.	Wichita State	Wichita State (0–0)	Winthrop (4–0)	UCF (7–2)	UCF (11–2)	UCF (15–3)	Baylor (11–7)	College of Charleston (16–4)	College of Charleston (20–4)	Texas A&M (22–10)	UCF (30–8)	Stanford (20–14)	Mississippi State (27–11)	College of Charleston (35–9)	Arkansas (35–14)	TCU (36–16)	NC State (39–15)	NC State (40–17)	South Carolina (41–23)	South Carolina (41–23)	South Carolina (41–23)	26.
27.	Virginia	Virginia (0–0)	Florida (2–1)	Nebraska (5–0)	Texas Tech (11–1)	Texas Tech (14–2)	Vanderbilt (12–3)	Tennessee (16–5)	Oregon State (19–4)	Rice (21–10)	Evansville (27–8)	Oklahoma State (27–14)	Rice (29–14)	UCF (36–11)	Troy (31–16)	Troy (35–16)	TCU (37–18)	TCU (40–18)	Wichita State (51–23)	Wichita State (51–24)	Wichita State (51–24)	27.
28.	Winthrop	Winthrop (0–0)	Oklahoma State (4–2)	Texas Tech (7–1)	Oregon State (9–1)	Oregon State (11–2)	Coastal Carolina (13–3)	Oregon State (16–3)	Auburn (19–8)	Arizona State (21–13)	Ole Miss (22–10)	Creighton (28–8)	Coastal Carolina (33–9)	Arkansas (33–13)	St. John's (33–13)	St. John's (35–14)	St. John's (39–14)	Wichita State (49–22)	Creigthon (48–17)	Creigthon (48–17)	Creigthon (48–17)	28.
29.	Pepperdine	Florida Atlantic (0–0)	Florida Atlantic (3–0)	TCU (5–2)	Oklahoma State (7–4)	Oklahoma State (11–5)	East Carolina (11–4)	Washington (13–8)	Oklahoma State (19–8)	Southern California (17–8)	Pepperdine (22–10)	Mississippi State (23–10)	College of Charleston (31–9)	TCU (31–14)	Illinois (31–14–1)	Cal Poly (32–18)	Cal Poly (34–19)	St. John's (39–16)	TCU (41–20)	TCU (41–20)	TCU (41–20)	29.
30.	Florida Atlantic	Nebraska (0–0)	UCF (5–1)	NC State (7–1)	College of Charleston (7–1)	Winthrop (13–3)	Oregon State (13–3)	Long Beach State (16–9)	Arizona State (18–13)	Southern Miss (22–5)	Creighton (26–7)	TCU (24–12)	TCU (27–13)	Northwestern State (34–15)	Northwestern State (34–15)	Creighton (39–13)	Creighton (42–13)	Mississippi State (40–20)	St. John's (41–18)	St. John's (41–18)	St. John's (41–18)	30.
	Preseason Dec 22	Week 1 Feb 7	Week 2 Feb 14	Week 3 Feb 21	Week 4 Feb 28	Week 5 Mar 7	Week 6 Mar 14	Week 7 Mar 21	Week 8 Mar 28	Week 9 Apr 4	Week 10 Apr 11	Week 11 Apr 18	Week 12 Apr 25	Week 13 May 2	Week 14 May 9	Week 15 May 16	Week 16 May 23	Week 17 May 30	Week 18 June 7	Week 19 June 13	Week 20 June 28	
		Dropped: 29 Pepperdine	Dropped: 17 Washington; 27 Virginia; 30 Nebraska	Dropped: 21 Clemson; 22 Long Beach State; 23 Arizona State; 29 Florida Atlantic	Dropped: 20 UC Irvine; 21 Notre Dame; 24 Winthrop; 29 TCU; 30 NC State	Dropped: 24 Clemson; 25 Baylor; 30 College of Charleston	Dropped: 27 Texas Tech; 29 Oklahoma State; 30 Winthrop	Dropped: 17 Georgia; 27 Vanderbilt; 29 East Carolina	Dropped: 23 Southern California; 27 Tennessee; 29 Washington	Dropped: 19 Michigan; 21 Wichita State; 25 Coastal Carolina; 29 Oklahoma State	Dropped: 26 Texas A&M; 27 Rice; 28 Arizona State; 30 Southern Miss	Dropped: 27 Evansville; 28 Ole Miss; 29 Pepperdine	Dropped: 23 Auburn; 27 Oklahoma State; 28 Creighton	Dropped: 26 Mississippi State; 28 Coastal Carolina	Dropped: 18 South Carolina; 21 Missouri; 27 UCF	Dropped: 22 Stanford; 29 Illinois; 30 Northwestern State	Dropped: 22 Arkansas; 27 Troy	Dropped: 29 Cal Poly; 30 Creighton	Dropped: 26 NC State; 30 Mississippi State	None	None	

The preseason poll ranked the top 40 teams. Those not listed above were: 31. Nebraska 32. East Carolina 33. Arkansas 34. Coastal Carolina 35. Michigan 36. UC Irvine 37. TCU 38. Vanderbilt 39. Stetson 40. Tennessee

== NCBWA ==
	Preseason Jan 26	Week 1 Feb 7	Week 2 Feb 14	Week 3 Feb 21	Week 4 Feb 28	Week 5 Mar 7	Week 6 Mar 14	Week 7 Mar 21	Week 8 Mar 28	Week 9 Apr 4	Week 10 Apr 11	Week 11 Apr 18	Week 12 Apr 25	Week 13 May 2	Week 14 May 9	Week 15 May 16	Week 16 May 23	Week 17 May 30	Week 18 June 7	Week 19 June 14	Week 20 June 27	
1.	Texas	Texas (3–0)	Texas (7–0)	Texas (11–0)	Texas (15–0)	Texas (17–1)	Texas (21–1)	Tulane (19–3)	Georgia Tech (21–4)	Texas (26–5)	Texas (29–6)	Texas (32–6)	Texas (35–7)	Tulane (38–8)	Tulane (42–8)	Tulane (45–8)	Tulane (47–9)	Tulane (50–9)	Tulane (53–9)	Tulane (55–10)	Texas (56–16)	1.
2.	Cal State Fullerton	Miami (FL) (4–0)	Miami (FL) (7–0)	Tulane (7–0)	Tulane (9–1)	Tulane (13–1)	South Carolina (15–1)	Cal State Fullerton (17–4)	Cal State Fullerton (17–6)	Cal State Fullerton (21–7)	Tulane (29–5)	Tulane (32–6)	Tulane (35–7)	Texas (37–9)	Cal State Fullerton (36–12)	Cal State Fullerton (37–12)	Cal State Fullerton (40–13)	Oregon State (41–9)	Oregon State (44–9)	Oregon State (46–10)	Florida (48–23)	2.
3.	Tulane	Cal State Fullerton (2–1)	Cal State Fullerton (4–1)	LSU (7–0)	LSU (9–1)	South Carolina (12–1)	Cal State Fullerton (14–3)	LSU (17–4)	Tulane (21–5)	Tulane (25–5)	Cal State Fullerton (23–8)	Cal State Fullerton (26–9)	Cal State Fullerton (30–11)	Cal State Fullerton (33–11)	Nebraska (39–10)	Texas (41–11)	Texas (43–12)	Cal State Fullerton (41–9)	Cal State Fullerton (45–16)	Nebraska (56–13)	Arizona State (42–25)	3.
4.	Miami (FL)	Tulane (0–0)	Tulane (3–0)	Cal State Fullerton (5–1)	South Carolina (9–0)	Cal State Fullerton (11–2)	Tulane (15–3)	Georgia Tech (16–2)	Texas (23–4)	Georgia Tech (23–6)	Georgia Tech (26–7)	Georgia Tech (29–7)	Florida (30–10)	Nebraska (37–9)	Texas (39–11)	Oregon State (39–8)	Oregon State (41–9)	Nebraska (51–13)	Nebraska (54–130	Texas (51–16)	Baylor (46–24)	4.
5.	Stanford	Stanford (4–2)	Stanford (7–2)	Miami (FL) (8–2)	North Carolina (8–0)	Rice (12–3)	Georgia Tech (16–2)	Arkansas (18–2)	LSU (19–6)	Florida (23–7)	Florida (25–8)	Florida (27–9)	Miami (FL) (30–10–1)	Miami (FL) (33–11–1)	Miami (FL) (36–11–1)	Miami (FL) (38–12–1)	Nebraska (46–12)	Texas (45–14)	Texas (49–15)	Florida (45–20)	Tulane (56–12)	5.
6.	LSU	LSU (0–0)	LSU (2–0)	South Carolina (6–0)	Cal State Fullerton (7–2)	LSU (11–3)	LSU (14–4)	Texas (21–4)	Florida State (27–5)	North Carolina (24–5)	South Carolina (28–5)	Arizona (26–11)	Nebraska (34–8)	Florida (31–12)	Georgia Tech (34–13)	Nebraska (41–12)	Arizona (36–17)	Florida (40–20)	Florida (43–20)	Baylor (44–22)	Nebraska (57–15)	6.
7.	South Carolina	South Carolina (0–0)	South Carolina (3–0)	North Carolina (4–0)	Georgia (5–1)	Florida State (19–1)	Arkansas (16–1)	South Carolina (17–3)	Arkansas (21–4)	LSU (21–8)	North Carolina (27–6)	Miami (FL) (29–9)	Georgia Tech (30–10)	Georgia Tech (32–12)	Oregon State (36–8)	Georgia Tech (37–14)	Florida (38–18)	Georgia Tech (42–16)	Georgia Tech (45–17)	Tennessee (46–19)	Oregon State (46–12)	7.
8.	North Carolina	North Carolina (0–0)	North Carolina (0–0)	Georgia (3–0)	Miami (FL) (10–3)	Georgia Tech (11–2)	Rice (14–5)	Florida State (24–4)	Nebraska (21–3)	Nebraska (25–3)	Arizona (24–10)	Nebraska (31–7)	Oregon State (30–7)	Oregon State (32–8)	Arizona (32–15)	Arizona (33–16)	Baylor (36–20)	Arizona (37–19)	Baylor (42–21)	Arizona State (39–23)	Tennessee (46–21)	8.
9.	Arizona State	Georgia (0–0)	Georgia (0–0)	Arizona (9–1)	Florida State (15–1)	Miami (FL) (13–4)	Florida (15–4)	Miami (FL) (20–5)	North Carolina (20–5)	South Carolina (24–5)	Florida State (32–8)	Baylor (25–13)	Arizona (27–14)	Arizona (29–15)	Baylor (30–17)	Baylor (34–18)	Florida State (48–16)	Baylor (39–21)	Florida State (53–18)	Cal State Fullerton (46–18)	Cal State Fullerton (46–18)	9.
10.	Georgia	Georgia Tech (0–0)	Georgia Tech (2–1)	Georgia Tech (5–1)	Rice (10–2)	Vanderbilt (10–0)	North Carolina (11–3)	North Carolina (15–5)	South Carolina (19–5)	Florida State (29–7)	Nebraska (27–6)	Long Beach State (27–12)	Baylor (27–16)	Baylor (30–17)	Florida (32–15)	Louisiana–Lafayette (44–12)	Miami (FL) (38–15–1)	Florida State (50–18)	Miami (FL) (41–17–1)	Georgia Tech (45–19)	Georgia Tech (45–19)	10.
11.	Georgia Tech	Texas A&M (0–0)	Arizona (6–0)	Rice (7–1)	Arizona (11–3)	Arkansas (12–1)	Miami (FL) (13–4)	Stanford (12–7)	Florida (19–7)	Stanford (17–9)	Miami (FL) (27–9)	South Carolina (29–8)	North Carolina (33–8–1)	Long Beach State (32–14)	North Carolina (36–10–1)	Florida State (45–14)	Georgia Tech (38–16)	Miami (FL) (38–15–1)	Tennessee (44–19)	Florida State (53–20)	Florida State (53–20)	11.
12.	Texas A&M	Rice (1–0)	Baylor (3–0)	Baylor (5–2)	Wichita State (11–0)	North Carolina (9–3)	Texas A&M (15–5)	Baylor (15–7)	Stanford (14–8)	Arizona (21–10)	Oregon State (26–5)	Oregon State (27–7)	Long Beach State (29–14)	North Carolina (36–10–1)	Louisiana–Lafayette (41–11)	LSU (35–17)	LSU (38–18)	LSU (38–20)	Arizona (39–21)	Miami (FL) (41–19–1)	Miami (FL) (41–19–1)	12.
13.	Rice	Arizona (3–0)	Rice (3–1)	Florida State (11–1)	Florida (8–2)	Stanford (11–7)	Florida State (21–4)	Ole Miss (17–4)	Mississippi State (17–4)	Miami (FL) (24–9)	Louisiana–Lafayette (29–6)	North Carolina (28–8)	Louisiana–Lafayette (35–8)	Louisiana–Lafayette (38–9)	Florida State (41–14)	Long Beach State (35–17)	Louisiana–Lafayette (45–15)	Louisiana–Lafayette (47–17)	Rice (44–17)	Rice (45–19)	Rice (45–19)	13.
14.	Arizona	Florida State (6–0)	Florida State (8–1)	Texas A&M (5–2)	Georgia Tech (7–2)	Texas A&M (12–4)	Stanford (11–7)	Oregon State (16–3)	Miami (FL) (22–7)	Louisiana–Lafayette (25–6)	Long Beach State (24–11)	Louisiana–Lafayette (32–7)	Alabama (29–13)	Alabama (32–14)	Alabama (34–16)	Alabama (35–18)	Long Beach State (36–19)	Long Beach State (36–20)	Ole Miss (47–18)	Arizona (39–21)	Arizona (39–21)	14.
15.	Washington	Long Beach State 95–1)	Arizona State (6–4)	Stanford (7–5)	Stanford (9–6)	Florida (11–2)	Arizona (14–6)	Texas A&M (17–7)	Louisiana–Lafayette (22–5)	Ole Miss (21–7)	Stanford (19–11)	Florida State (33–11)	South Carolina (30–11)	South Carolina (32–12)	Long Beach State (33–16)	Rice (36–15)	Alabama (37–19)	Rice (41–17)	Southern California (37–19)	Ole Miss (48–20)	Ole Miss (48–20)	15.
16.	Florida State	Washington (0–0)	Long Beach State (5–3)	Ole Miss (3–1)	Ole Miss (5–2)	Georgia (7–3)	Louisiana–Lafayette (17–2)	Arizona (16–9)	Ole Miss (19–5)	Oregon State (24–4)	Missouri (26–6)	Arkansas (30–8)	Florida State (35–13)	Florida State (37–14)	LSU (33–16)	Florida (34–18)	Rice (38–17)	Alabama (38–21)	LSU (40–22)	Southern California (41–22)	Southern California (41–22)	16.
17.	Ole Miss	Arizona State (3–3)	Ole Miss (0–0)	Mississippi State (0–0)	Mississippi State (2–0)	Mississippi State (6–0)	Ole Miss (13–3)	Louisiana–Lafayette (19–4)	Oregon State (19–4)	Long Beach State (21–10)	Arkansas (27–6)	Alabama (26–12)	Missouri (30–10)	LSU (31–14)	South Carolina (32–16)	North Carolina (37–14–1)	North Carolina (40–15–1)	NC State (40–17)	Arizona State (37–22)	Clemson (43–23)	Clemson (43–23)	17.
18.	Long Beach State	Ole Miss (0–0)	Mississippi State (0–0)	Notre Dame (3–1)	Arkansas (9–1)	Arizona (12–5)	Mississippi State 99–2)	Mississippi State (13–3)	Michigan (15–3)	Auburn (21–10)	LSU (23–11)	Missouri (27–9)	LSU (29–13)	Missouri (31–13)	Rice (32–15)	Tennessee (36–16)	NC State (38–15)	North Carolina (40–17–1)	Clemson (42–21)	LSU (40–22)	LSU (40–22)	18.
19.	Mississippi State	Mississippi State (0–0)	Notre Dame (0–0)	Southern California (4–0)	Nebraska (7–0)	Wichita State (15–1)	Georgia (10–5)	Nebraska (18–2)	UCF (25–5)	Rice (21–10)	Alabama (24–10)	LSU (26–120	Rice (29–14)	Rice (32–15)	Tennessee (35–15)	Arkansas (37–15)	Tennessee (39–17)	Tennessee (41–19)	Louisiana–Lafayette (48–19)	Louisiana–Lafayette (48–19)	Louisiana–Lafayette (48–19)	19.
20.	Notre Dame	Notre Dame (0–0)	Texas A&M (1–2)	Florida (5–2)	Texas A&M (7–4)	Louisiana–Lafayette (14–1)	Nebraska (12–2)	UCF (23–4)	Wichita State (22–6)	Missouri (23–5)	Rice (23–12)	Rice (26–13)	Arizona State (28–15)	Arkansas (33–13)	Arkansas (35–14)	Arizona State (30–19)	College of Charleston (44–11)	College of Charleston (47–13)	Alabama (40–23)	Alabama (40–23)	Alabama (40–23)	20.
21.	Florida	Florida (0–0)	Florida (2–1)	Wichita State (6–0)	UCF (11–2)	Ole Miss (9–3)	Wichita State (16–3)	Coastal Carolina (17–3)	Oklahoma State (19–8)	Arkansas (22–6)	Mississippi State (20–8)	College of Charleston (29–6)	Arkansas (31–11)	Arizona State (29–17)	Missouri (32–16)	College of Charleston (41–10)	Ole Miss (40–16)	Ole Miss (44–18)	Long Beach State (37–22)	Long Beach State (37–22)	Long Beach State (37–22)	21.
22.	TCU	TCU (0–0)	TCU (3–0)	UCF (7–2)	Vanderbilt (6–0)	Southern California (7–4)	Michigan (8–3)	Wichita State (19–5)	Rice (18–9)	Texas A&M (22–10)	College of Charleston (26–5)	Arizona State (25–15)	Coastal Carolina (33–9)	College of Charleston (35–9)	Arizona State (29–18)	Missouri (34–17)	Missouri (37–19)	Missouri (39–21)	NC State (41–19)	NC State (41–19)	NC State (41–19)	22.
23.	Clemson	Clemson (0–0)	Clemson (0–0)	UC Irvine (6–2)	Southern California (5–2)	Oregon State (11–2)	Southern California (9–6)	Michigan (11–3)	Coastal Carolina (21–4)	College of Charleston (23–4)	Baylor (22–12)	Auburn (25–14)	UCF (35–9)	Ole Miss (32–13)	College of Charleston (35–9)	Ole Miss (37–16)	Arizona State (31–22)	Arizona State (34–22)	North Carolina (41–19–1)	North Carolina (41–19–1)	North Carolina (41–19–1)	23.
24.	Wichita State	Wichita State (0–0)	Wichita State (3–0)	Arkansas (6–1)	Louisiana–Lafayette (10–0)	TCU (10–3)	TCU (12–5)	College of Charleston (16–4)	Missouri (20–4)	Baylor (19–11)	Auburn (22–13)	UCF (35–8)	Southern California (26–12)	UF (35–9)	Ole Miss (35–15)	Coastal Carolina (42–11)	Coastal Carolina (44–12)	Coastal Carolina (48–14)	College of Charleston (48–15)	College of Charleston (48–15)	College of Charleston (48–15)	24.
25.	UCF	UCF (2–0)	UCF (5–1)	Oklahoma State (7–3)	Texas Tech (11–1)	Nebraska (8–2)	Oregon State (13–3)	Texas Tech (17–6)	Texas A&M (19–9)	Mississippi State (17–7)	UCF (30–8)	Coastal Carolina (29–9)	Stanford (24–14)	Coastal Carolina (34–11)	Coastal Carolina (37–11)	Southern California 932–15)	Arkansas (37–18)	TCU (40–18)	Missouri (40–23)	Missouri (40–23)	Missouri (40–23)	25.
26.	Winthrop	Oklahoma State (3–0)	Southern California (3–0)	Winthrop (8–1)	Clemson (4–2)	Texas Tech (14–2)	UCF (19–3)	TCU (14–7)	College of Charleston (20–4)	Coastal Carolina (23–7)	Coastal Carolina (25–9)	Tennessee (25–10)	College of Charleston (31–9)	Southern California (27–15)	Southern California (27–16)	NC State (36–14)	St. John's (39–14)	Southern California (37–19)	Coastal Carolina (50–16)	Coastal Carolina (50–16)	Coastal Carolina (50–16)	26.
27.	Oklahoma State	Winthrop (0–0)	Oklahoma State (4–2)	NC State (7–1)	Oklahoma State (7–4)	Coastal Carolina (10–2)	Baylor (11–7)	Southern California (13–6)	Baylor (16–10)	Southern Miss (22–5)	Wichita State (27–10)	Southern California (22–10)	Tennessee (28–12)	Stanford (24–15)	UCF (37–13)	St. John's (35–14)	Southern California (34–18)	Arkansas (37–20)	TCU (41–20)	TCU (41–20)	TCU (41–20)	27.
28.	Florida Atlantic	Florida Atlantic (0–0)	Arkansas (4–0)	TCU (5–2)	NC State (9–2)	Oklahoma State (11–5)	Coastal Carolina (13–3)	Tennessee (14–3)	Long Beach State (18–10)	Alabama (22–9)	Southern California (21–9)	Stanford (20–14)	TCU (27–13)	TCU (31–14)	Stanford (27–16)	TCU (36–16)	TCU (37–18)	St. John's (39–16)	Arkansas (39–22)	Arkansas (39–22)	Arkansas (39–22)	28.
29.	Arkansas	Arkansas (0–0)	Washington (0–3)	Vanderbilt (2–0)	Baylor (6–4)	UCF (15–3)	Oklahoma State (14–6)	Rice (15–8)	Arizona State (18–13)	Arizona State (21–13)	Evansville (27–8)	Wichita State (31–11)	Oklahoma state (29–16)	Creighton (34–10)	TCU (34–15)	Stanford (29–19)	Southern Miss (39–17)	Southern Miss (41–19)	St. John's (41–18)	St. John's (41–18)	St. John's (41–18)	29.
30.	East Carolina	East Carolina (0–0)	Winthrop (4–0)	Oral Roberts (4–2)	TCU (7–3)	Michigan (5–2)	Tennessee (14–3)	Oklahoma State (17–7)	Texas Tech (17–8)	Tennessee (20–9)	TCU (22–10)	TCU (24–12)	Creighton (31–10)	Southern Miss (28–11)	Creighton (36–12)	Southern Miss (37–15)	Creighton (42–13)	Creighton (46–15)	Southern Miss (41–21)	Southern Miss (41–21)	Southern Miss (41–21)	30.
31.	Stetson	Stetson (0–0)	Florida Atlantic (3–0)	Texas Tech (7–1)	Coastal Carolina (7–1)	Baylor (8–6)	Southern Miss (12–3)	UAB (15–5)	Auburn (19–8)	TCU (18–10)	Tennessee (23–9)	Southern Miss (27–8)	Mississippi State 927–11)	Cal Poly (30–14)	Southern Miss (34–15)	Creighton (39–13)	Clemson (37–19)	Clemson (39–21)	Creighton (48–17)	Creighton (48–17)	Creighton (48–17)	31.
32.	Virginia	Virginia (0–0)	Oral Roberts (3–0)	Nebraska (5–0)	Notre Dame (4–3)	Winthrop (13–3)	Vanderbilt (12–3)	Washington (13–8)	TCU (16–9)	Texas Tech (19–10)	Texas Tech (22–11)	Oklahoma State (27–14)	Cal Poly (27–14)	Tennessee (32–14)	Cal Poly (31–16)	Cal Poly (32–18)	Cal Poly (34–19)	Wichita State (49–22)	Wichita State (51–24)	Wichita State (51–24)	Wichita State (51–24)	32.
33.	Baylor	Baylor (0–0)	Virginia (2–1)	Alabama (5–2)	Winthrop (9–3)	Clemson (5–4)	Texas Tech (15–5)	Florida Atlantic (14–7)	Alabama (20–7)	NC State (21–9)	Southern Miss (24–7)	Creighton (28–8)	Vanderbilt (27–12)	Northwestern State (34–15)	Northwestern State (34–15)	UCF (39–14)	Northwestern State (40–16)	Mississippi State (40–20)	Mississippi State (42–22)	Mississippi State (42–22)	Mississippi State (42–22)	33.
34.	Vanderbilt	Vanderbilt (0–0)	Vanderbilt (0–0)	Florida Atlantic (4–2)	Oregon State (9–1)	Alabama (12–3)	East Carolina (11–4)	Alabama (18–5)	Georgia Southern (15–7)	Wichita State (23–9)	Creighton (26–7)	Mississippi State (23–10)	Southern Miss (28–11)	Wichita State (38–14)	St. John's (33–13)	Northwestern State (37–16)	UCF (40–16)	Ohio State (39–18)	Ohio State (40–20)	Ohio State (40–20)	Ohio State (40–20)	34.
35.	Oral Roberts	Oral Roberts (0–0)	Stetson (2–1)	College of Charleston (5–1)	Alabama (8–3)	Long Beach State (11–6) т; NC State (11–4) т	Alabama (14–5)	San Francisco (16–7)	NC State (18–8)	Evansville (24–7)	St. John's (19–9)	Northwestern State (29–12)	Northwestern State (31–14); Virginia (29–13)	San Francisco (31–14)	San Francisco (34–14)	San Francisco (36–16)	San Francisco (38–18)	Northwestern State (40–18)	Northwestern State (41–20)	Northwestern State (41–20)	Northwestern State (41–20)	35.
	Preseason Jan 26	Week 1 Feb 7	Week 2 Feb 14	Week 3 Feb 21	Week 4 Feb 28	Week 5 Mar 7	Week 6 Mar 14	Week 7 Mar 21	Week 8 Mar 28	Week 9 Apr 4	Week 10 Apr 11	Week 11 Apr 18	Week 12 Apr 25	Week 13 May 2	Week 14 May 9	Week 15 May 16	Week 16 May 23	Week 17 May 30	Week 18 June 7	Week 19 June 14	Week 20 June 27	
		None	Dropped: 30 East Carolina	Dropped: 15 Arizona State; 16 Long Beach State; 23 Clemson; 29 Washington; 33 Virginia; 35 Stetson	Dropped: 23 UC Irvine; 30 Oral Roberts; 34 Florida Atlantic; 35 College of Charleston	Dropped: 32 Notre Dame	Dropped: 32 Winthrop; 33 Clemson; 35 Long Beach State; 35 NC State	Dropped: 9 Florida; 19 Georgia; 31 Southern Miss; 32 Vanderbilt; 34 East Carolina	Dropped: 16 Arizona; 27 Southern California; 28 Tennessee; 31 UAB; 32 Washington; 33 Florida Atlantic; 35 San Francisco	Dropped: 18 Michigan; 19 UCF; 21 Oklahoma State; 34 Georgia Southern	Dropped: 15 Ole Miss; 22 Texas A&M; 29 Arizona State; 33 NC State	Dropped: 29 Evansville; 32 Texas Tech; 35 St. John's	Dropped: 23 Auburn; 29 Wichita State	Dropped: 29 Oklahoma State; 31 Mississippi State; 33 Vanderbilt; 35 Virginia	Dropped: 34 Wichita State	Dropped: 17 South Carolina	Dropped: 29 Stanford	Dropped: 32 Cal Poly; 34 UCF; 35 San Francisco	None	None	None	
