= Matt LaPorta =

American baseball player (born 1985)

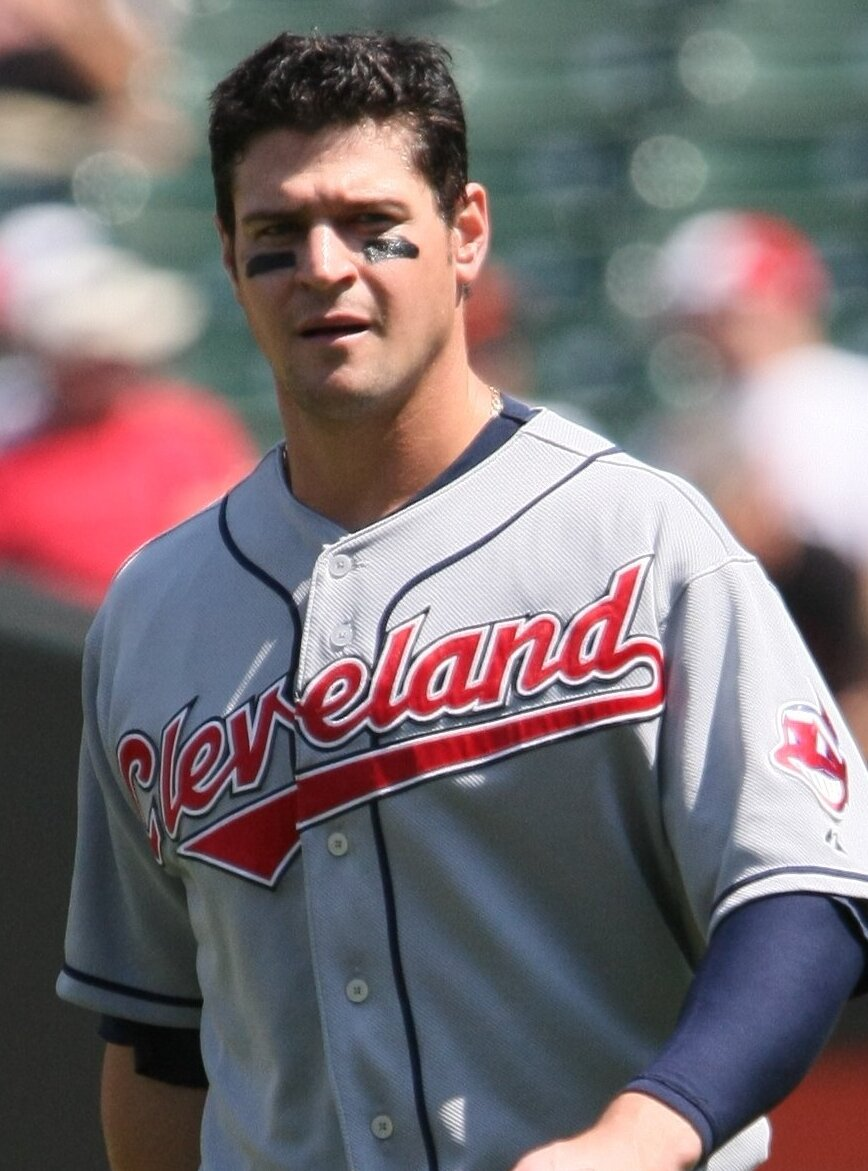
- LaPorta with the Indians in 2009
- First baseman
- Born: January 8, 1985 (age 41); Port Charlotte, Florida, U.S.
- Batted: Right Threw: Right

MLB debut
- May 3, 2009, for the Cleveland Indians

Last MLB appearance
- October 2, 2012, for the Cleveland Indians

MLB statistics
- Batting average: .238
- Home runs: 31
- Runs batted in: 120
- Stats at Baseball Reference

Teams
- Cleveland Indians (2009–2012)
Medals
Men's baseball
Representing United States
Summer Olympics
Bronze medal – third place	2008 Beijing	Team

Matthew Vincent LaPorta (born January 8, 1985) is an American former professional baseball first baseman and left fielder who played for the Cleveland Indians of Major League Baseball (MLB) from 2009 to 2012. LaPorta played college baseball for the University of Florida.

== Early life ==
LaPorta was born in Port Charlotte, Florida. He attended Charlotte High School after transferring from Port Charlotte High School. He played fullback on his freshman football team for the PCHS Pirates.

== College career ==
LaPorta was originally drafted by the Chicago Cubs in the 14th round of the 2003 MLB draft, but instead accepted an athletic scholarship to attend the University of Florida in Gainesville, Florida, where he played for coach Pat McMahon's Florida Gators baseball team from 2004 to 2007. In 2004, he played collegiate summer baseball in the Cape Cod Baseball League for the Yarmouth-Dennis Red Sox, returned to the league in 2006 to play for the Brewster Whitecaps, and was named a league all-star both seasons.

He led NCAA Division I baseball with 26 home runs, which garnered LaPorta All-American honors as he helped lead the team to the 2005 College World Series final. In 2006, his batting average dipped from .328 to .259. In June, LaPorta was drafted in the fourteenth round of the 2006 Major League Baseball draft by the Boston Red Sox, but he chose to stay at Florida for his senior year; during that season, he earned his second All-American selection. LaPorta batted .402 with twenty home runs his senior season with the Gators. Also, LaPorta was recognized as the only 2 time recipient of the prestigious SEC Player of the Year award. He graduated from Florida with a bachelor's degree in health and human performance in 2009.

== Professional career ==
=== Milwaukee Brewers ===
==== Minor leagues ====
LaPorta was drafted by the Milwaukee Brewers with the seventh overall pick of the 2007 Major League Baseball draft. On June 25, the Brewers agreed to a contract with LaPorta, giving him a signing bonus of approximately $2 million.

After rehabilitating his leg, LaPorta was sent to the Brewers' rookie-level affiliate, the Helena Brewers. In his first at-bat as a professional player, LaPorta hit a home run. He played 7 games with Helena in left field and as the designated hitter. Then in August, LaPorta was moved up to the Brewers' Single-A affiliate, the West Virginia Power. Laporta enjoyed success with the club, hitting 10 home runs in 23 games during the regular season. Like in Helena, he played mostly left field and designated hitter. The Power went on to make the South Atlantic League playoffs and advanced to the finale, but lost to the Columbus Catfish in a best-of-5 series. The Brewers selected LaPorta to represent them in the Arizona Fall League. He played with the Mesa Solar Sox for 30 games, and hit 6 home runs during that time, which was tied for the most in the league.

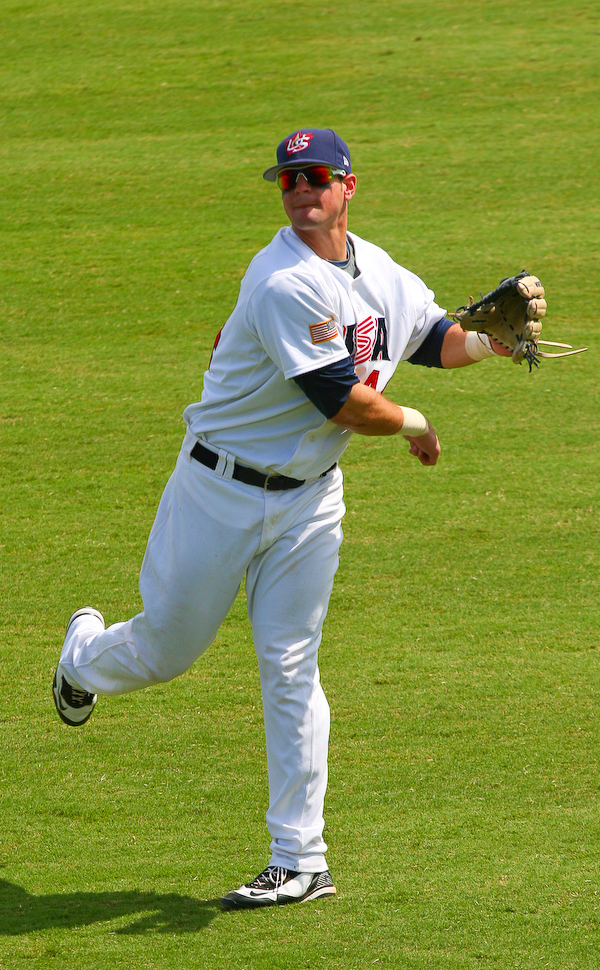
LaPorta playing for Team USA in 2008

In January, the Brewers announced that LaPorta would be invited to spring training. On the opening day game for the Huntsville Stars, LaPorta hit a grand slam. By May, some wondered whether LaPorta might be the next Ryan Braun. Through June 13, 2008, LaPorta was leading the Southern League in home runs with 20 and was batting .288 with 66 RBI.

=== Cleveland Indians ===
On July 7, 2008, LaPorta was traded to the Cleveland Indians along with Zach Jackson, Rob Bryson, and Michael Brantley in exchange for left-handed starting pitcher CC Sabathia. Upon his arrival to the Akron Aeros, Cleveland's Double-A affiliate, he switched from right to left field. LaPorta made his first appearance with the club on July 9. LaPorta was selected to play in the Futures Game on July 13 for Team USA. On July 16, LaPorta was one of 24 players selected to represent the United States in the 2008 Beijing Olympics.

Before the Olympics, Team USA competed in exhibition games against Canada. LaPorta had three home runs and five RBIs in the four games against Canada. USA began play in the Olympics on August 13 against Korea.

In a game against China on August 18, LaPorta suffered a mild concussion after he was struck in the head by a pitch by Chinese relief pitcher Chen Kun at the start of the seventh inning. The beaning followed a controversial play in the sixth inning when American outfielder Nate Schierholtz made a hard slide home against backup catcher Yang Yang on a sacrifice fly. Yang was in the game after China's starting catcher Wang Wei left the game after suffering a left knee injury following a collision at the plate with LaPorta in the fifth inning. After being struck by the pitch, LaPorta was taken to a hospital for a precautionary CAT scan; Chen Kun and China's pitching coach Steven Ontiveros were ejected from the game. The United States went on to win the game 9-1. In the Bronze-Medal match against Japan, LaPorta had a solo home run as Team USA won the Bronze Medal.

LaPorta attended spring training with the Indians; he was assigned to the Triple-A Columbus Clippers on March 24, 2009. LaPorta batted .333 with five homers, four doubles, two triples, 14 RBI and a 1.054 OPS in 21 games with the Clippers, and was called up to the Indians on May 2.

==== Major leagues ====
On May 3, 2009, LaPorta struck out in his first Major League at-bat against the Detroit Tigers. The next day, LaPorta recorded his first major league home run hit off of the Toronto Blue Jays' Brian Tallet.

Going into spring training for the 2010 season, LaPorta was expected to transition to the role of starting first baseman. However, when the Indians signed Russell Branyan and announced he would be the everyday first baseman, LaPorta instead became a contender for the left field position, along with Michael Brantley. Branyan's back problems limited him to no game action during spring training, causing him to begin the season on the 15-day disabled list. Consequently, LaPorta was moved back to the first baseman position. After Branyan was activated from the disabled list on April 20, LaPorta was moved primarily to the backup first baseman role, with some playing time in left field. For him to receive more at-bats and continue his development, LaPorta was optioned to Triple-A Columbus on June 7. On June 27 the Indians traded Branyan to the Seattle Mariners for outfielder Ezequiel Carrera and shortstop Juan Diaz, LaPorta was recalled from Triple-A Columbus to be the everyday first baseman for the Indians.

According to Baseball Reference, LaPorta split the 2012 season between the Indians (22 games) and Triple-A Columbus (101 games). On November 20, 2012, LaPorta was assigned outright to the Indians' Triple-A affiliate, the Columbus Clippers. LaPorta spent the 2013 campaign split between Columbus and the rookie-level Arizona League Indians. In 57 appearances for the two affiliates, he slashed a combined .249/.331/.517 with 14 home runs and 40 RBI.

=== Piratas de Campeche ===
On February 10, 2014, LaPorta signed a minor league contract with the Baltimore Orioles organization. He was released by Baltimore prior to the start of the season on March 21.

On April 5, 2014, LaPorta signed with the Piratas de Campeche of the Mexican League. In 32 games for Campeche, he batted .286/.366/.555 with seven home runs and 24 RBI. The Piratas released LaPorta on May 13.

On April 12, 2015, LaPorta announced his retirement from professional baseball.

== Awards and achievements ==
- 2005 and 2007 SEC Player of the Year
- Two time Southern League Player of the Week in 2008
- 2008 USA Olympic Team
- 2008 Futures Game selection

== See also ==
- 2005 College Baseball All-America Team
- 2007 College Baseball All-America Team
- Florida Gators
- List of Florida Gators baseball players
- List of Olympic medalists in baseball
- List of University of Florida alumni
- List of University of Florida Olympians
