= 2005 Oregon State Beavers baseball team =

American college baseball season

2005 Oregon State Beavers baseball

Pac-10 Conference champions Corvallis Regional champions Corvallis Super Regional champions

College World Series, 0–2
- Conference: Pacific-10 Conference

Ranking
- Coaches: No. 7
- CB: No. 7
- Record: 46–12 (19–5 Pac-10)
- Head coach: Pat Casey (11th season)
- Assistant coach: Marty Lees (2nd season)
- Pitching coach: Dan Spencer (9th season)
- Home stadium: Goss Stadium at Coleman Field

2005 Pacific-10 Conference baseball standings
	Conf.				Overall
Team	W		L	PCT	W		L	PCT
No. 7 Oregon State ‍†‍‍^{y}	19	–	5	.792	46	–	12	.793
No. 12 Arizona ‍‍‍^{y}	17	–	7	.708	39	–	21	.650
No. 17 Southern California ‍‍‍^{y}	15	–	9	.625	41	–	22	.651
No. 3 Arizona State ‍‍‍^{y}	15	–	9	.625	42	–	25	.627
California ‍‍‍	13	–	11	.542	34	–	23	.596
Washington ‍‍‍	12	–	12	.500	33	–	22	.600
Stanford ‍‍‍^{y}	12	–	12	.500	34	–	25	.576
UCLA ‍‍‍	4	–	20	.167	15	–	41	.268
Washington State ‍‍‍	1	–	23	.042	21	–	37	.362
† – Conference champion y – Invited to the NCAA tournament As of June 30, 2005; Rankings from Collegiate Baseball

The 2005 Oregon State Beavers baseball team represented Oregon State University in the 2005 NCAA Division I baseball season. The Beavers played their home games at Goss Stadium at Coleman Field. The team was coached by Pat Casey in his 11th year at Oregon State.

The Beavers won the Corvallis Regional and Super Regional to advanced to the College World Series, where they were defeated by the Baylor Bears.

== Roster ==
2005 Oregon State Beavers baseball team
Players
Coaches

#	Pos.	Name	B/T	Height	Weight	Year	Home town
1	INF	Todd Shelton	R/R	5 ft 10 in (1.78 m)	185 lb (84 kg)	Jr	Bakersfield, California
2	RHP	Dallas Buck	R/R	6 ft 2 in (1.88 m)	190 lb (86 kg)	So	Newberg, Oregon
3	INF	Chris Kunda	R/R	6 ft 0 in (1.83 m)	175 lb (79 kg)	Jr	Philomath, Oregon
4	RHP	Kurt Steele	R/R	6 ft 2 in (1.88 m)	180 lb (82 kg)	Jr	Corvallis, Oregon
6	LHP	Kevin Gunderson	R/L	5 ft 10 in (1.78 m)	165 lb (75 kg)	So	Portland, Oregon
8	INF	Andy Jenkins	R/R	6 ft 0 in (1.83 m)	200 lb (91 kg)	Sr	Salem, Oregon
9	OF	Cole Gillespie	R/R	6 ft 1 in (1.85 m)	200 lb (91 kg)	So	West Linn, Oregon
10	INF	Darwin Barney	R/R	5 ft 10 in (1.78 m)	170 lb (77 kg)	Fr	Beaverton, Oregon
11	C	Mitch Canham	L/R	6 ft 2 in (1.88 m)	200 lb (91 kg)	So	Lake Stevens, Washington
12	OF	Rob Folsom	R/R	5 ft 9 in (1.75 m)	180 lb (82 kg)	Fr	Medford, Oregon
14	INF	Ryan Gipson	R/R	5 ft 11 in (1.8 m)	180 lb (82 kg)	Jr	Central Point, Oregon
15	INF	Lonnie Lechelt	R/R	6 ft 0 in (1.83 m)	190 lb (86 kg)	Fr	Kennewick, Washington
16	LHP	Kevin Joslyn	L/L	6 ft 1 in (1.85 m)	185 lb (84 kg)	Sr	Spokane, Washington
17	LHP	Anton Maxwell	L/L	5 ft 9 in (1.75 m)	175 lb (79 kg)	So	Anchorage, Alaska
18	RHP	Nate Fogle	R/R	6 ft 3 in (1.91 m)	185 lb (84 kg)	Jr	Gresham, Oregon
19	RHP	Jake McCormick	R/R	6 ft 2 in (1.88 m)	220 lb (100 kg)	So	Marysville, California
20	C	Casey Priseman	R/R	6 ft 1 in (1.85 m)	180 lb (82 kg)	Fr	Woodinville, Washington
21	OF	Tyler Graham	R/R	6 ft 0 in (1.83 m)	180 lb (82 kg)	Jr	Great Falls, Montana
22	OF	Danny Anderson	R/R	6 ft 4 in (1.93 m)	200 lb (91 kg)	Sr	Modesto, California
23	OF	Jacoby Ellsbury	L/L	6 ft 1 in (1.85 m)	190 lb (86 kg)	Jr	Madras, Oregon
24	OF	Chris Campos	L/L	6 ft 1 in (1.85 m)	208 lb (94 kg)	Sr	Modesto, California
25	INF	Joey Ledesma	L/R	6 ft 0 in (1.83 m)	190 lb (86 kg)	Jr	Tucson, Arizona
26	OF	Mike Lissman	R/R	6 ft 0 in (1.83 m)	195 lb (88 kg)	So	Ontario, Oregon
27	RHP	Rob Summers	R/R	6 ft 0 in (1.83 m)	185 lb (84 kg)	Fr	Beaverton, Oregon
28	RHP	Daniel Turpen	R/R	6 ft 4 in (1.93 m)	195 lb (88 kg)	Fr	McMinnville, Oregon
29	INF	Shea McFeely	R/R	6 ft 2 in (1.88 m)	215 lb (98 kg)	Jr	Federal Way, Washington
30	INF	Travis Carver	L/R	6 ft 3 in (1.91 m)	235 lb (107 kg)	Fr	McMinnville, Oregon
31	INF	Scott Nelson	R/R	6 ft 3 in (1.91 m)	215 lb (98 kg)	Jr	Eugene, Oregon
32	RHP	Reed Brown	R/R	6 ft 4 in (1.93 m)	210 lb (95 kg)	Fr	Edmonds, Washington
34	RHP	Jonah Nickerson	R/R	6 ft 1 in (1.85 m)	190 lb (86 kg)	So	Oregon City, Oregon
35	C	Billy Munich	S/R	6 ft 1 in (1.85 m)	225 lb (102 kg)	Jr	El Macero, California
36	RHP	Jon Koller	R/R	6 ft 6 in (1.98 m)	235 lb (107 kg)	Jr	Carlsbad, California
37	OF	Geoff Wagner	L/L	6 ft 2 in (1.88 m)	215 lb (98 kg)	Jr	Redmond, Oregon
38	LHP	A. J. Davidson	S/L	6 ft 3 in (1.91 m)	200 lb (91 kg)	Jr	Florence, Oregon
40	OF	Joel Evans	R/R	6 ft 5 in (1.96 m)	230 lb (104 kg)	Sr	Redmond, Washington
44	P	Eddie Kunz	R/R	6 ft 4 in (1.93 m)	250 lb (113 kg)	Fr	Portland, Oregon
	OF	Nick Chapin	L/L	5 ft 11 in (1.8 m)	185 lb (84 kg)	Jr	Oregon City, Oregon
	INF	Cory Ellis	R/R	5 ft 7 in (1.7 m)	160 lb (73 kg)	Fr	Portland, Oregon
	RHP	Josh Keller	R/R	6 ft 4 in (1.93 m)	230 lb (104 kg)	Fr	Portland, Oregon

Head coach

Pat Casey

Assistant coach(es)

Marty Lees
David Wong

Pitching coach(es)

Dan Spencer

Legend

- (C) Team captain
- (S) Suspended
- (I) Ineligible
- Injured
- Current redshirt

== Schedule ==
2005 Oregon State Beavers baseball game log (46–12)
Regular season (41–9)
February (9–1)

#	Date	Opponent	Rank	Site/stadium	Score	Overall record	Pac-10 record
Bob Schaefer Memorial Tournament
1	February 3	vs. New Mexico State		Packard Stadium • Tempe, Arizona	W 19–0 (7)	1–0	–
2	February 4	vs. Gonzaga		Packard Stadium • Tempe, Arizona	L 1–3	1–1	–
3	February 5	vs. New Mexico State		Packard Stadium • Tempe, Arizona	W 11–2	2–1	–
4	February 6	at No. 11 Arizona State		Packard Stadium • Tempe, Arizona	W 12–6	3–1	–
5	February 15	Portland		Goss Stadium at Coleman Field • Corvallis, Oregon	W 6–4	4–1	–
San Diego Tournament
6	February 19	vs. UC Davis		John Cunningham Stadium • San Diego, California	W 8–0	5–1	–
7	February 20	at San Diego		John Cunningham Stadium • San Diego, California	W 3–2	6–1	–
8	February 25	at UC Santa Barbara		Caesar Uyesaka Stadium • Santa Barbara, California	W 4–2	7–1	–
9	February 26	at UC Santa Barbara		Caesar Uyesaka Stadium • Santa Barbara, California	W 6–4	8–1	–
10	February 27	at UC Santa Barbara		Caesar Uyesaka Stadium • Santa Barbara, California	W 5–3	9–1	–

March (12–3)

#	Date	Opponent	Rank	Site/stadium	Score	Overall record	Pac-10 record
11	March 4	UC Riverside	No. 28	Goss Stadium at Coleman Field • Corvallis, Oregon	L 2–3	9–2	–
12	March 5	UC Riverside	No. 28	Goss Stadium at Coleman Field • Corvallis, Oregon	W 5–2	10–2	–
13	March 6	UC Riverside	No. 28	Goss Stadium at Coleman Field • Corvallis, Oregon	W 7–2	11–2	–
Yellow Book USA Classic
14	March 11	vs. Cal State Northridge	No. 28	Eddy D. Field Stadium • Malibu, California	W 4–1	12–2	–
15	March 12	at Pepperdine	No. 28	Eddy D. Field Stadium • Malibu, California	L 4–9	12–3	–
16	March 13	vs. No. 30 Winthrop	No. 28	Eddy D. Field Stadium • Malibu, California	W 8–2	13–3	–
17	March 18	Sacramento State	No. 30	Goss Stadium at Coleman Field • Corvallis, Oregon	W 8–2	14–3	–
18	March 18	Sacramento State	No. 30	Goss Stadium at Coleman Field • Corvallis, Oregon	W 7–4	15–3	–
19	March 19	Sacramento State	No. 30	Goss Stadium at Coleman Field • Corvallis, Oregon	W 9–3	16–3	–
20	March 22	at Portland	No. 28	Joe Etzel Field • Portland, Oregon	W 9–3	17–3	–
21	March 24	Dallas Baptist	No. 28	Goss Stadium at Coleman Field • Corvallis, Oregon	L 7–17	17–4	–
22	March 25	Dallas Baptist	No. 28	Goss Stadium at Coleman Field • Corvallis, Oregon	W 7–2	18–4	–
23	March 25	Dallas Baptist	No. 28	Goss Stadium at Coleman Field • Corvallis, Oregon	W 11–3	19–4	–
24	March 28	BYU	No. 27	Goss Stadium at Coleman Field • Corvallis, Oregon	W 12–5	20–4	–
25	March 29	BYU	No. 27	Goss Stadium at Coleman Field • Corvallis, Oregon	W 11–6	21–4	–

April (10–4)

#	Date	Opponent	Rank	Site/stadium	Score	Overall record	Pac-10 record
26	April 1	California	No. 27	Goss Stadium at Coleman Field • Corvallis, Oregon	W 11–1	22–4	1–0
27	April 2	California	No. 27	Goss Stadium at Coleman Field • Corvallis, Oregon	W 5–2	23–4	2–0
28	April 3	California	No. 27	Goss Stadium at Coleman Field • Corvallis, Oregon	W 4–2	24–4	3–0
29	April 9	at No. 12 Stanford	No. 15	Sunken Diamond • Stanford, California	W 9–7	25–4	4–0
30	April 9	at No. 12 Stanford	No. 15	Sunken Diamond • Stanford, California	W 11–10	26–4	5–0
31	April 10	at No. 12 Stanford	No. 15	Sunken Diamond • Stanford, California	L 3–4	26–5	5–1
32	April 15	at No. 6 Arizona	No. 11	Jerry Kindall Field at Frank Sancet Stadium • Tucson, Arizona	L 5–7	26–6	5–2
33	April 16	at No. 6 Arizona	No. 11	Jerry Kindall Field at Frank Sancet Stadium • Tucson, Arizona	W 17–1	27–6	6–2
34	April 17	at No. 6 Arizona	No. 11	Jerry Kindall Field at Frank Sancet Stadium • Tucson, Arizona	L 6–7	27–7	6–3
35	April 22	Washington State	No. 11	Goss Stadium at Coleman Field • Corvallis, Oregon	W 5–4	28–7	7–3
36	April 24	Washington State	No. 11	Goss Stadium at Coleman Field • Corvallis, Oregon	W 8–1	29–7	8–3
37	April 24	Washington State	No. 11	Goss Stadium at Coleman Field • Corvallis, Oregon	W 7–6	30–7	9–3
38	April 29	No. 17 Arizona State	No. 9	Goss Stadium at Coleman Field • Corvallis, Oregon	W 6–5	31–7	10–3
39	April 30	No. 17 Arizona State	No. 9	Goss Stadium at Coleman Field • Corvallis, Oregon	L 1–3	31–8	10–4

May (9–2)

#	Date	Opponent	Rank	Site/stadium	Score	Overall record	Pac-10 record
40	May 1	No. 17 Arizona State	No. 9	Goss Stadium at Coleman Field • Corvallis, Oregon	W 5–1	32–8	11–4
41	May 3	Portland	No. 9	Goss Stadium at Coleman Field • Corvallis, Oregon	W 6–2	33–8	11–4
42	May 6	at UCLA	No. 9	Jackie Robinson Stadium • Los Angeles, California	W 3–1	34–8	12–4
43	May 7	at UCLA	No. 9	Jackie Robinson Stadium • Los Angeles, California	W 10–4	35–8	13–4
44	May 8	at UCLA	No. 9	Jackie Robinson Stadium • Los Angeles, California	W 16–3	36–8	14–4
45	May 13	at Washington	No. 8	Husky Ballpark • Seattle, Washington	W 7–0	37–8	15–4
46	May 14	at Washington	No. 8	Husky Ballpark • Seattle, Washington	W 7–4	38–8	16–4
47	May 15	at Washington	No. 8	Husky Ballpark • Seattle, Washington	W 3–1 (10)	39–8	17–4
48	May 20	No. 17 Southern California	No. 3	Goss Stadium at Coleman Field • Corvallis, Oregon	W 5–4	40–8	18–4
49	May 21	No. 17 Southern California	No. 3	Goss Stadium at Coleman Field • Corvallis, Oregon	W 10–7	41–8	19–4
50	May 22	No. 17 Southern California	No. 3	Goss Stadium at Coleman Field • Corvallis, Oregon	L 2–12	41–9	19–5

Postseason (5–3)
NCAA Tournament: Corvallis Regional (3–0)

#	Date	Opponent	Seed/Rank	Site/stadium	Score	Overall record	NCAAT record
51	June 3	(4) Ohio State	(1) No. 3	Goss Stadium at Coleman Field • Corvallis, Oregon	W 4–3	42–9	1–0
52	June 4	(3) No. 29 St. John's	(1) No. 3	Goss Stadium at Coleman Field • Corvallis, Oregon	W 11–1	43–9	2–0
53	June 5	(3) No. 29 St. John's	(1) No. 3	Goss Stadium at Coleman Field • Corvallis, Oregon	W 19–3	44–9	3–0

NCAA Tournament: Corvallis Super Regional (2–1)

#	Date	Opponent	Seed/Rank	Site/stadium	Score	Overall record	NCAAT record
54	June 11	No. 16 Southern California	(8) No. 3	Goss Stadium at Coleman Field • Corvallis, Oregon	W 10–4	45–9	4–0
55	June 12	No. 16 Southern California	(8) No. 3	Goss Stadium at Coleman Field • Corvallis, Oregon	L 8–9 (10)	45–10	4–1
56	June 13	No. 16 Southern California	(8) No. 3	Goss Stadium at Coleman Field • Corvallis, Oregon	W 10–8	46–10	5–1

NCAA Tournament: College World Series (0–2)

#	Date	Opponent	Seed/Rank	Site/stadium	Score	Overall record	CWS record
57	June 18	vs. (1) No. 1 Tulane	(8) No. 2	Johnny Rosenblatt Stadium • Omaha, Nebraska	L 1–3	46–11	0–1
58	June 20	vs. (4) No. 4 Baylor	(8) No. 2	Johnny Rosenblatt Stadium • Omaha, Nebraska	L 3–4 (10)	46–12	0–2

== Awards and honors ==
Darwin Barney

- First Team All-Pac-10
- Pacific-10 Conference Freshman of the Year
- First Team Freshman All-American Collegiate Baseball

Dallas Buck

- First Team All-Pac-10
- First Team All-American American Baseball Coaches Association
- First Team All-American Baseball America
- First Team All-American Collegiate Baseball
- Second Team All-American National Collegiate Baseball Writers Association
- First Team All-American USA Today Sports Weekly

Jacoby Ellsbury

- First Team All-Pac-10
- Pacific-10 Conference Player of the Year
- First Team All-American American Baseball Coaches Association
- First Team All-American Baseball America
- Second Team All-American Collegiate Baseball
- First Team All-American National Collegiate Baseball Writers Association
- First Team All-American USA Today Sports Weekly

Nate Fogle

- Honorable Mention All-Pac-10

Ryan Gipson

- Honorable Mention All-Pac-10

Tyler Graham

- Honorable Mention All-Pac-10

Kevin Gunderson

- First Team All-Pac-10

Andy Jenkins

- First Team All-Pac-10

Anton Maxwell

- Honorable Mention All-Pac-10

Shea McFeely

- Honorable Mention All-Pac-10

Jonah Nickerson

- First Team All-Pac-10
- Second Team All-American USA Today Sports Weekly
