= 2005 Arizona Wildcats baseball team =

2005 Arizona Wildcats baseball

Fullerton Regional
- Conference: Pacific-10 Conference
- Record: 39-21 (17-7 Pac-10)
- Head coach: Andy Lopez (4th season)
- Assistant coaches: Mark Wasikowski (4th season); Jeff Casper (4th season); Steve Kling (4th season)
- Home stadium: Sancet Stadium

2005 Pacific-10 Conference baseball standings
	Conf.				Overall
Team	W		L	PCT	W		L	PCT
No. 7 Oregon State ‍†‍‍^{y}	19	–	5	.792	46	–	12	.793
No. 12 Arizona ‍‍‍^{y}	17	–	7	.708	39	–	21	.650
No. 17 Southern California ‍‍‍^{y}	15	–	9	.625	41	–	22	.651
No. 3 Arizona State ‍‍‍^{y}	15	–	9	.625	42	–	25	.627
California ‍‍‍	13	–	11	.542	34	–	23	.596
Washington ‍‍‍	12	–	12	.500	33	–	22	.600
Stanford ‍‍‍^{y}	12	–	12	.500	34	–	25	.576
UCLA ‍‍‍	4	–	20	.167	15	–	41	.268
Washington State ‍‍‍	1	–	23	.042	21	–	37	.362
† – Conference champion y – Invited to the NCAA tournament As of June 30, 2005; Rankings from Collegiate Baseball

The 2005 Arizona Wildcats baseball team represented the University of Arizona during the 2005 NCAA Division I baseball season. The Wildcats played their home games at Jerry Kindall Field at Frank Sancet Stadium. The team was coached by Andy Lopez in his 4th season at Arizona. The Wildcats finished with a record of 39-22 (17-7 Conf.) and were selected to the NCAA tournament for the 3rd straight year and 3rd time under Andy Lopez, losing in the Fullerton Regional final to Cal State Fullerton.

== Previous season ==
The Wildcats finished the 2004 season with a record of 36-27-1 (12-12 Conf.). Arizona advanced to the postseason for a 2nd straight year, winning the South Bend Regional and Long Beach Super Regional on the way to making their first College World Series appearance since their championship-winning 1986 season. This would also mark Andy Lopez's 4th appearance in the World Series as a coach, his first since leading the Florida Gators to the 1998 College World Series.

== Personnel ==
=== Roster ===
2005 Arizona Wildcats baseball roster
Pitchers • 17 - Mike Koons - Freshman • 18 - Eric Berger - Freshman • 19 - David Coulon - Freshman • 24 - Matt Baugh - Freshman • 27 - Sean Rierson - Senior • 26 - Mark Melancon - Sophomore • 28 - Jason Seefeld - Freshman • 30 - Sean Jarrett - Sophomore • 45 - Kevin Guyette - Senior • 46 - Brad Mills - Sophomore • 48 - Jon Meloan - Junior • N/A - Lance Sewell - Redshirt	Catchers • 13 - Nick Hundley - Junior • 31 - Aaron Von Lindern - Freshman • 42 - Drew McDonald - Freshman Infielders • 1 - Brad Boyer - Junior • 2 - Lee Franklin - Sophomore • 3 - Bryan Kervin - Freshman • 4 - Jason Donald - Sophomore • 15 - Kurtis Goodin - Sophomore • 23 - Jordan Brown - Junior • 28 - Jason Seefeld - Freshman • 29 - Brett Schyphers - Freshman	Outfielders • 5 - Jeff Van Houten - Senior • 6 - Derek Decater - Junior • 10 - Trevor Crowe - Junior • 11 - Todd Williams - Freshman • 12 - Bill Rhinehart - Sophomore • 21 - Chris Frey - Junior

=== Coaches ===
2005 Arizona Wildcats baseball coaching staff
- Andy Lopez - Head coach
- Mark Wasikowski - Assistant coach
- Jeff Casper - Assistant coach
- Steve Kling - Volunteer Assistant Coach

== Schedule and results ==
2005 Arizona Wildcats baseball game log
Regular season
Date	Opponent	Rank	Site/stadium	Score	Win/Loss	Overall Record	Pac-10 Record
Feb 4	New Mexico	#12	Sancet Stadium • Tucson, AZ	W 9-0	Meloan (1-0)	1-0	
Feb 5	New Mexico	#12	Sancet Stadium • Tucson, AZ	W 14-5	Rierson (1-0)	2-0	
Feb 6	New Mexico	#12	Sancet Stadium • Tucson, AZ	W 15-6	Berger (1-0)	3-0	
Feb 12	Northern Colorado	#11	Sancet Stadium • Tucson, AZ	W 16-1	Meloan (2-0)	4-0	
Feb 12	Northern Colorado	#11	Sancet Stadium • Tucson, AZ	W 13-2	Guyette (1-0)	5-0	
Feb 13	Northern Colorado	#11	Sancet Stadium • Tucson, AZ	W 10-0	Coulon (1-0)	6-0	
Feb 15	#23 Arizona State	#10	Sancet Stadium • Tucson, AZ	W 7-6	Koons (1-0)	7-0	
Feb 18	at Texas-Pan American	#10	Edinburg Stadium • Edinburg, TX	W 18-3	Jarrett (1-0)	8-0	
Feb 19	at Texas-Pan American	#10	Edinburg Stadium • Edinburg, TX	W 8-2	Guyette (2-0)	9-0	
Feb 20	at Texas-Pan American	#10	Edinburg Stadium • Edinburg, TX	L 0-7	Koons (1-1)	9-1	
Feb 23	Arizona State	#10	Sancet Stadium • Tucson, AZ	W 11-5	Berger (2-0)	10-1	
Feb 25	UC Riverside	#10	Sancet Stadium • Tucson, AZ	L 8-12	Jarrett (1-1)	10-2	
Feb 26	UC Riverside	#10	Sancet Stadium • Tucson, AZ	L 1-3	Guyette (2-1)	10-3	
Feb 27	UC Riverside	#10	Sancet Stadium • Tucson, AZ	W 5-4	Rierson (2-0)	11-3	
Mar 4	#1 Texas	#14	Sancet Stadium • Tucson, AZ	L 4-5	Melancon (0-1)	11-4	
Mar 5	#1 Texas	#14	Sancet Stadium • Tucson, AZ	W 8-3	Guyette (3-1)	12-4	
Mar 6	#1 Texas	#14	Sancet Stadium • Tucson, AZ	L 4-5	Rierson (2-1)	12-5	
Mar 11	#18 Mississippi State	#16	Sancet Stadium • Tucson, AZ	W 9-3	Meloan (3-0)	13-5	
Mar 12	#18 Mississippi State	#16	Sancet Stadium • Tucson, AZ	W 7-3	Guyette (4-1)	14-5	
Mar 13	#18 Mississippi State	#16	Sancet Stadium • Tucson, AZ	L 12-13	Rierson (2-2)	14-6	
Mar 15	UNLV	#13	Sancet Stadium • Tucson, AZ	L 4-8	Jarrett (1-2)	14-7	
Mar 16	UNLV	#13	Sancet Stadium • Tucson, AZ	W 15-4	Coulon (2-0)	15-7	
Mar 18	at #3 Cal State Fullerton	#13	Goodwin Field • Fullerton, CA	W 1-0	Meloan (4-0)	16-7	
Mar 19	at #3 Cal State Fullerton	#13	Goodwin Field • Fullerton, CA	L 1-7	Guyette (4-2)	16-8	
Mar 20	at #3 Cal State Fullerton	#13	Goodwin Field • Fullerton, CA	L 15-17	Melancon (0-2)	16-9	
Mar 24	Washington	#16	Sancet Stadium • Tucson, AZ	W 13-6	Meloan (5-0)	17-9	1-0
Mar 25	Washington	#16	Sancet Stadium • Tucson, AZ	W 6-5	Melancon (1-2)	18-9	2-0
Mar 26	Washington	#16	Sancet Stadium • Tucson, AZ	L 8-16	Coulon (2-1)	18-10	2-1
Apr 1	at UCLA	#13	Jackie Robinson Stadium • Los Angeles, CA	W 8-4	Jarrett (2-2)	19-10	3-1
Apr 2	at UCLA	#13	Jackie Robinson Stadium • Los Angeles, CA	W 11-0	Guyette (5-2)	20-10	4-1
Apr 3	at UCLA	#13	Jackie Robinson Stadium • Los Angeles, CA	W 12-2	Berger (3-0)	21-10	5-1
Apr 8	at Washington State	#11	Bailey-Brayton Field • Pullman, WA	W 13-0	Meloan (6-0)	22-10	6-1
Apr 9	at Washington State	#11	Bailey-Brayton Field • Pullman, WA	W 7-4	Guyette (6-2)	23-10	7-1
Apr 10	at Washington State	#11	Bailey-Brayton Field • Pullman, WA	W 13-10	Melancon (2-2)	24-10	8-1
Apr 15	#11 Oregon State	#6	Sancet Stadium • Tucson, AZ	W 7-5	Meloan (7-0)	25-10	9-1
Apr 16	#11 Oregon State	#6	Sancet Stadium • Tucson, AZ	L 1-17	Guyette (6-3)	25-11	9-2
Apr 17	#11 Oregon State	#6	Sancet Stadium • Tucson, AZ	W 7-6	Melancon (3-2)	26-11	10-2
Apr 19	at New Mexico	#5	Isotopes Park • Albuquerque, NM	W 14-3	Berger (4-0)	27-11	
Apr 22	vs UC Irvine	#5	Hornet Field • Sacramento, CA	L 3-4	Melancon (3-3)	27-12	
Apr 23	vs UC Irvine	#5	Hornet Field • Sacramento, CA	L 1-12	Guyette (6-4)	27-13	
Apr 23	at Sacramento State	#5	Hornet Field • Sacramento, CA	L 4-7	Coulon (2-2)	27-14	
Apr 29	#20 USC	#8	Sancet Stadium • Tucson, AZ	L 0-13	Meloan (7-1)	27-15	10-3
Apr 30	#20 USC	#8	Sancet Stadium • Tucson, AZ	W 7-2	Guyette (7-4)	28-15	11-3
May 1	#20 USC	#8	Sancet Stadium • Tucson, AZ	W 18-4	Berger (5-0)	29-15	12-3
May 6	Utah Valley State	#8	Sancet Stadium • Tucson, AZ	W 16-0	Meloan (8-1)	30-15	
May 7	Utah Valley State	#8	Sancet Stadium • Tucson, AZ	W 12-1	Guyette (8-4)	31-15	
May 8	Utah Valley State	#8	Sancet Stadium • Tucson, AZ	W 7-2	Berger (6-0)	32-15	
May 14	at #17 Arizona State	#7	Packard Stadium • Tempe, AZ	L 2-6	Meloan (8-2)	32-16	12-4
May 15	at #17 Arizona State	#7	Packard Stadium • Tempe, AZ	W 16-7	Guyette (9-4)	33-16	13-4
May 16	at #17 Arizona State	#7	Packard Stadium • Tempe, AZ	W 18-1	Rierson (3-2)	34-16	14-4
May 20	at Stanford	#9	Sunken Diamond • Palo Alto, CA	W 9-4	Meloan (9-2)	35-16	15-4
May 21	at Stanford	#9	Sunken Diamond • Palo Alto, CA	L 4-5	Berger (6-1)	35-17	15-5
May 22	at Stanford	#9	Sunken Diamond • Palo Alto, CA	W 11-8	Coulon (3-2)	36-17	16-5
May 28	California	#6	Sancet Stadium • Tucson, AZ	L 3-6	Berger (6-2)	36-18	16-6
May 29	California	#6	Sancet Stadium • Tucson, AZ	W 10-5	Melancon (4-3)	37-18	17-6
May 29	California	#6	Sancet Stadium • Tucson, AZ	L 4-7	Coulon (3-3)	37-19	17-7
NCAA Fullerton Regional
Jun 3	vs (3) Missouri	#9 (2)	Goodwin Field • Fullerton, CA	W 5-3	Meloan (10-2)	38-19	
Jun 4	(1) #2 Cal State Fullerton	#9 (2)	Goodwin Field • Fullerton, CA	W 6-5	Guyette (10-4)	39-19	
Jun 5	(1) #2 Cal State Fullerton	#9 (2)	Goodwin Field • Fullerton, CA	L 2-7	Rierson (3-3)	39-20	
Jun 6	(1) #2 Cal State Fullerton	#9 (2)	Goodwin Field • Fullerton, CA	L 3-6	Meloan (10-3)	39-21	

=== Fullerton Regional ===
Fullerton Regional Teams
(1) Cal State Fullerton Titans	(4) Harvard Crimson	(2) Arizona Wildcats	(3) Missouri Tigers

== 2005 MLB draft ==
Player	Position	Round	Overall	MLB team
Trevor Crowe	OF	1	14	Cleveland Indians
Nick Hundley	C	2	76	San Diego Padres
Jordan Brown	1B	4	124	Cleveland Indians
Jon Meloan	RHP	5	166	Los Angeles Dodgers
Kevin Guyette	RHP	10	318	Boston Red Sox
Chris Frey	OF	11	327	Colorado Rockies
Jeff Van Houten	OF	13	396	Florida Marlins
Brad Boyer	2B	14	413	Seattle Mariners
