= Jim Negrych =

American baseball player (born 1985)

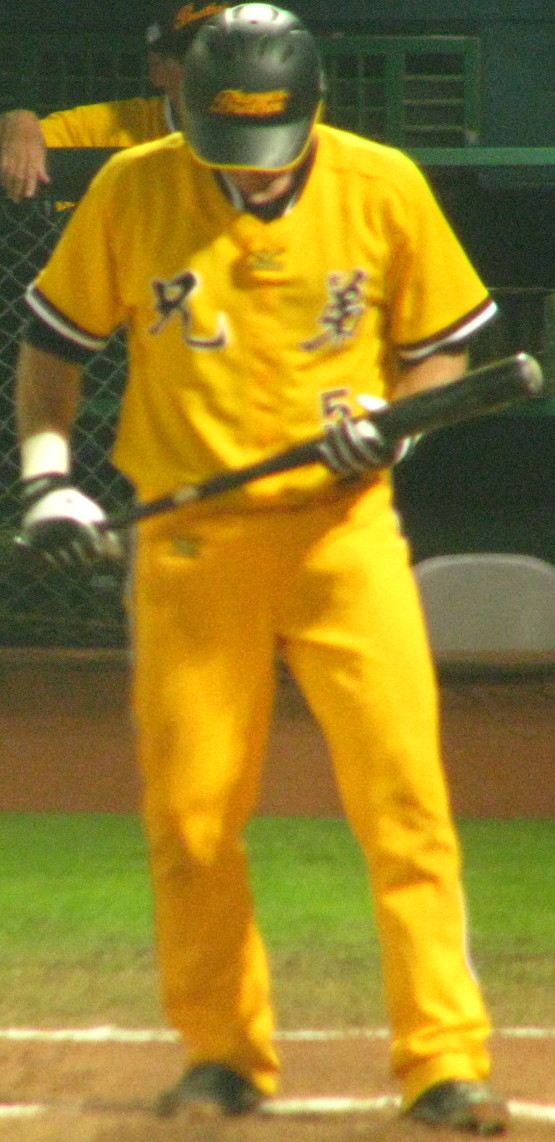
- Second baseman
- Born: March 2, 1985 (age 41); Buffalo, New York, U.S.
- Batted: Left Threw: Right

CPBL debut
- May 17, 2014, for the Chinatrust Brothers

Last CPBL appearance
- July 31, 2015, for the Chinatrust Brothers

CPBL statistics
- Batting average: .348
- Home runs: 6
- Runs batted in: 69
- Stats at Baseball Reference

Teams
- Chinatrust Brother Elephants (2014–2015)

James William Negrych (born March 2, 1985) is an American former professional baseball infielder. He played in the Chinese Professional Baseball League (CPBL) for the Chinatrust Brother Elephants.

== College career ==
Negrych was a two-time All-American at the University of Pittsburgh (2005 and 2006). In 2005, he played collegiate summer baseball with the Harwich Mariners of the Cape Cod Baseball League. Negrych was drafted in the 6th round by the Pittsburgh Pirates in the 2006 draft. He was the first Pittsburgh Panthers player drafted by the Pittsburgh Pirates since Larry Lamonde in 1981 and Ken Macha in 1972.

== Professional career ==
=== Pittsburgh Pirates ===
The Pittsburgh Pirates drafted Negrych out of the University of Pittsburgh in the 6th round of the 2006 Major League Baseball draft. In 2008, Negrych was the Pirates minor league player of the year. In 2008, while playing for the Lynchburg Hillcats, he was a Carolina League Mid-Season All-Star and a Carolina League Post-Season All-Star. In 2010, while playing for the Altoona Curve and Indianapolis Indians, Negrych was named an Milb.com Organizational All-Star. In 2011, Negrych was traded to the Florida Marlins for catcher Carlos Paulino.

=== Florida Marlins ===
In 2011, Negrych was traded to the Florida Marlins for catcher Carlos Paulino. In 2011, he played for the Jacksonville Suns of the Southern League.

=== Washington Nationals ===
Negrych signed with the Washington Nationals on April 22, 2012. In 91 games with the Triple-A Syracuse Chiefs, Negrych hit .264/.357/.391 with eight home runs and 39 RBI.

=== Toronto Blue Jays ===
On November 20, 2012, the Toronto Blue Jays announced that they had signed Negrych to a minor league contract with an invitation to spring training. He was assigned to his hometown Buffalo Bisons. On April 18, Negrych hit for the cycle as the Bisons defeated the Syracuse Chiefs 27–9. In July 2013, Negrych was named the starter at second base in the Triple-A All-Star Game.

=== Philadelphia Phillies ===
On January 13, 2014, the Philadelphia Phillies signed Negrych to a minor league contract. According to the International League transactions page, he was released on March 23.
