= Jason Urquidez =

American baseball player

Free agent
- Pitcher
- Born: September 12, 1982 (age 43); Tarzana, Los Angeles, California, U.S.
- Bats: Right Throws: Right

MLB debut
- 2005, for the Yakima Washington

MLB statistics
- Win–loss record: 54-40
- Earned run average: 3.34
- Strikeouts: 773
- Stats at Baseball Reference

Teams
- Arizona Diamondbacks (2005-2011); Boston Red Sox (2012); Los Angeles Angels (2013); Lancaster Barnstormers (2014); Tijuana Toros (2015-2019); Tokyo Yakult Swallows (2018)

Career highlights and awards
- 2016/2017 Tijuana Toros Reliever of the Year

Jason Carl Urquidez (born September 12, 1982, in Tarzana, California) is an American former professional baseball pitcher who spent his career primarily in minor leagues, independent leagues, and the Mexican League, excelling as a relief pitcher and closer without ever reaching Major League Baseball.

Urquidez attended Arizona State University, where he played two seasons (2004–2005) and compiled a 22–7 record with a 3.70 ERA over 48 appearances (34 starts), striking out 192 batters in 219 innings pitched.

In 2004, as a junior, he earned First-Team All-Pac-10 honors and was named ASU Pitcher of the Year after going 12–3 with a 3.41 ERA, including a Pac-10 Pitcher of the Week award for a complete-game three-hitter against No. 1 Rice. His 2005 senior season featured a 10–4 record, honorable mention All-Pac-10 recognition, and co-ASU Pitcher of the Year honors, highlighted by a dominant performance in the NCAA Super Regional against Cal State Fullerton, where he allowed just one run over 11.1 innings. He was selected by the Arizona Diamondbacks in the 17th round (501st overall) of the 2005 MLB Draft out of ASU.

Professionally, Urquidez debuted in 2005 with the Diamondbacks' Short-Season A affiliate Yakima Bears, posting a 1.80 ERA in 11 appearances. Over eight minor league seasons (2005–2013) with Arizona, Boston, and Los Angeles Angels affiliates, he appeared in 244 games—mostly in relief—with a 26–18 record, 4.03 ERA, and 339 strikeouts in 372.2 innings, including stints at Triple-A levels like Reno Aces and Salt Lake Bees. Transitioning to independent and international play, he thrived as a closer for the Lancaster Barnstormers in the Atlantic League (2012–2015), earning a 2013 Mid-Season All-Star nod with 54 saves and a 1.54 ERA over 106 games. In the Mexican League with Toros de Tijuana (2015–2019), he recorded 64 saves and a 3.13 ERA in 142 appearances, highlighted by a 2017 season of 5–0 with a 0.98 ERA and 28 saves, earning Mid-Season All-Star honors; he also played winter ball in leagues like the Mexican Pacific League. Urquidez retired after the 2020–2021 winter season, concluding a 15-year career with 169 total saves, a 3.34 ERA, and 773 strikeouts in 779.2 innings across all professional levels.

== Early career ==
Urquidez attended Central Arizona College and pitched for the team for two years, leading them to the NJCAA National Championship during his freshman year in 2002. Following his time at junior college, Urquidez was drafted by the Tampa Bay Devil Rays in the 48th round of the 2002 MLB draft, but opted to continue his collegiate career. He later transferred to Arizona State University, where he spent his junior and senior seasons in 2004 and 2005, respectively. Urquidez finished off his ASU career with a 22–7 record and 3.70 ERA in 48 games (34 starts) across two seasons. He was named to the first team All Pac-10 in his 2004 junior-year season after leading the league with 12 wins. He was selected in the 11th round of the 2004 MLB draft (318th overall) by the Cincinnati Reds, but stayed at ASU for his senior season. In 2005, he was selected in the 17th round of the 2005 MLB draft by the Arizona Diamondbacks.

== Career ==
=== Minor leagues ===
Urquidez pitched in the Diamondbacks farm system during 2005–2011, starting out at the Class A Short Season level with the Yakima Bears of the Northwest League. He worked his way to Triple-A and pitched for both the Tucson Sidewinders and later the Reno Aces, operating as a relief pitcher and a closer. He became a free agent following the 2011 season.

On June 23, 2012, Urquidez signed a minor-league deal with the Boston Red Sox. Pitching for the Double-A Portland Sea Dogs out of the bullpen, he finished the season with a 4–2 record and 2.85 ERA. He elected free agency on November 2, 2012.

In August 2013, Urquidez signed a minor-league contract with the Los Angeles Angels. He elected free agency on November 4, 2013.

=== Lancaster Barnstormers ===
Urquidez spent the 2013 and 2014 seasons, and part of the 2015 season with the Lancaster Barnstormers of the Atlantic League of Professional Baseball. Operating as the team's closer, he is currently the franchise's leader in saves, earning 54 of them.

=== Toros de Tijuana ===
On June 2, 2015, Urquidez had his contract purchased by the Toros de Tijuana of the Mexican League. He became the team's closer prior to the 2016 season, and that same year finished with 26 saves out of 27 opportunities. The following year Urquidez had his most successful to date, earning 28 saves and finishing with a 5–0 record and a league-leading 0.98 ERA, along with a 0.83 WHIP and 56 strikeouts across 46 innings pitched, culminating in the first-ever league championship for the team. He was selected to the LMB's All-Star team and won the 'Reliever of the Year' award. He is currently the franchise's leader in saves, with 64 earned through 4 seasons spent with the club.

=== Tokyo Yakult Swallows ===
On June 20, 2018, after pitching the first half of the season in Tijuana, Urquidez was signed by the Tokyo Yakult Swallows of Japan's Nippon Professional Baseball. He became a free agent after the season.

=== Return to Tijuana ===
On February 21, 2019, Urquidez signed with the Toros de Tijuana of the Mexican League. He only appeared in 8 games for the club before being placed on the reserve list due to injuries. Urquidez was released by the organization on March 30, 2020.
