= Jenison (disambiguation) =

Jenison is an unincorporated community in Michigan, United States.

Jenison may also refer to:

- Jenison (surname)
- Jenison Public Schools, public school district in Jenison, Michigan
- Jenison High School, high school in Jenison, Michigan
- Jenison Fieldhouse, arena in East Lansing, Michigan
- Robert Jenison House, historic house in Natick, Massachusetts
- Jenison Shafto (1728–1771), English politician, and race-horse owner
- Jenison William Gordon (1747–1831), English baron and sheriff
- Jenison (footballer) (born 1991), Jenison de Jesus Brito e Brito, Brazilian footballer
