= PCMB =

PCMB may refer to:

- p-Chloromercuribenzoic acid
- Plymouth-Canton Marching Band
- PCMB (encoding), a mixed multi-byte character set
- Physics Chemistry Mathematics and Biology together
- Pixiv complex Mladá Boleslav (in planning)
