= Michigan Competing Band Association =

Michigan, United States

The Michigan Competing Band Association (MCBA) is a sanctioning body for high school marching band field contests in the state of Michigan, established in 1974. Not only does it host a great number of local competitions around the state, MCBA holds the only statewide marching band championships in Michigan. Previous championships were held at Roundhouse Stadium in Durand, Michigan, the Plymouth-Canton Educational Park Varsity Stadium in Canton, Michigan, Rynearson Stadium at Eastern Michigan University, and at the Pontiac Silverdome in Pontiac, Michigan. They are currently held at Ford Field in Detroit, Michigan. Prior to the 1992–93 school year, MCBA was known as the Michigan Competing Band Director's Association, or MCBDA.

== Classification and scoring ==
Bands are separated into "Flights" by the number of students enrolled in the high school itself (based on MHSAA second semester totals) and are not a measurement of band or program size. This has been in place since the 1992–93 school year.

In late July 2020, the MCBA announced the cancellation of the 2020 Marching Competitive Season.

On June 7, 2021, the MCBA announced its 2021 Competitive season and its schedule.

The flight sizes for the 2025 season are as follows:

- Flight I: More than 1637
- Flight II: 1189–1636
- Flight III: 837–1188
- Flight IV: 628–836
- Flight V: Less than 627

Bands are judged completely separately in their respective flights. Bands are given a score, placement, as well as caption awards for "Outstanding Music Performance", "Outstanding Visual Performance", and "Outstanding General Effect" in their respective flights. The judging system is as follows:

Field

- Visual Field Judge Able to move around the field
- Music Field Judge Able to move around the field

Each judge awards a maximum of 12.5 points, for a maximum total of 25 points.

Ensemble

- Visual Ensemble Judge Judges from press box or high vantage point in the stands
- Music Ensemble Judge Judges from press box or high vantage point in the stands

Each judge awards a maximum of 15 points, for a maximum total of 30 points.

General Effect

- General Effect Music Judge 1
- General Effect Music Judge 2
- General Effect Visual Judge

All G.E. judges view from the press box. Each General Effect judge awards a maximum of 15 points, for a maximum total of 45 points

The scoring for each band is as follows:

MCBA currently utilizes the Bands of America judging system in combination with several MCBA constructed judging sheets and criteria. Seven adjudicators are utilized in the scoring system:

- General Effect Music Judge 1 (15 pts)
- General Effect Music Judge 2 (15 pts)
- General Effect Visual Judge (15 pts)
- Music Field Judge (12.5 pts)
- Music Ensemble Judge (15 pts)
- Visual Field Judge (12.5 pts)
- Visual Ensemble Judge (15 pts)

Total possible = 100 pts

== Previous champions ==
2025

- Flight I: Walled Lake (92.200)
- Flight II: Jenison (93.400)
- Flight III: Reeths-Puffer (91.050)
- Flight IV: Lakeshore (90.400)
- Flight V: Watervliet (85.900)

2024

- Flight I: Walled Lake (92.200)
- Flight II: Jenison (89.300)
- Flight III: Reeths-Puffer (89.500)
- Flight IV: Lakeshore (86.700)
- Flight V: Grant (84.850)

2023

- Flight I: Rockford (88.050)
- Flight II: Jenison (88.900)
- Flight III: Dewitt (85.050)
- Flight IV: Lakeshore (84.150)
- Flight V: Watervliet (83.200)

2022

- Flight I: Rockford (90.300)
- Flight II: Jenison (89.950)
- Flight III: Reeths-Puffer (89.250)
- Flight IV: Ferndale (85.450)
- Flight V: Kent City (81.650)

2021

- Flight I: Rockford (92.850)
- Flight II: Jenison (91.400)
- Flight III: DeWitt (91.700)
- Flight IV: Ferndale (87.400)
- Flight V: Kent City (88.650)

2020

- Season cancelled due to the COVID-19 pandemic

2019

- Flight I: Rockford
- Flight II: Jenison
- Flight III: Reeths-Puffer
- Flight IV: Lakeshore (Stevensville)
- Flight V: Kent City

2018

- Flight I: Rockford
- Flight II: Jenison
- Flight III: Reeths-Puffer
- Flight IV: Lakeshore (Stevensville)
- Flight V: Godwin Heights (Wyoming)

2017

- Flight I: Rockford High School Marching Band Rockford, MI
- Flight II: Jenison High School Marching Band Jenison, MI
- Flight III: Stevensville-Lakeshore Marching Band Stevensville, MI
- Flight IV: Godwin Heights High School Marching Band Wyoming, MI

2016

- Flight I: Plymouth-Canton Marching Band Canton, MI
- Flight II: Reeths-Puffer High School Marching Band Muskegon, MI
- Flight III: Stevensville-Lakeshore Marching Band Stevensville, MI
- Flight IV: Ferndale High School Marching Band Ferndale, MI

2015

- Flight I: Plymouth-Canton Marching Band Canton, MI
- Flight II: Reeths-Puffer High School Marching Band Muskegon, MI
- Flight III: Stevensville-Lakeshore Marching Band Stevensville, MI
- Flight IV: Ferndale High School Marching Band Ferndale, MI

2014

- Flight I: Plymouth-Canton Marching Band Canton, MI
- Flight II: Reeths-Puffer High School Marching Band Muskegon, MI
- Flight III: Byron Center High School Marching Band Byron Center, MI
- Flight IV: Godwin Heights High School Marching Band Wyoming, MI

2013

- Flight I: Walled Lake Central High School Marching Band Walled Lake, MI
- Flight II: Jenison High School Marching Band Jenison, MI
- Flight III: Reeths-Puffer High School Marching Band Muskegon, MI
- Flight IV: Godwin Heights High School Marching Band Wyoming, MI

2012

- Flight I: Plymouth-Canton Marching Band Canton, MI
- Flight II: Jenison High School Marching Band Jenison, MI
- Flight III: Reeths-Puffer High School Marching Band Muskegon, MI
- Flight IV: Newaygo High School Marching Band Newaygo, MI

2011

- Flight I: Walled Lake Central High School Marching Band Walled Lake, MI
- Flight II: Jenison High School Marching Band Jenison, MI
- Flight III: Ferndale High School Marching band Ferndale MI
- Flight IV: Godwin Heights High School Marching Band Wyoming, MI

2010

- Flight I: Walled Lake Central High School Marching Band Walled Lake, MI
- Flight II: Reeths-Puffer High School Marching Band Muskegon, MI
- Flight III: Ferndale High School Marching Band Ferndale, MI
- Flight IV: Newaygo High School Marching Band, Newaygo, MI

2009

- Flight I: Plymouth-Canton Marching Band Canton, MI
- Flight II: Reeths-Puffer High School Marching Band Muskegon, MI
- Flight III: Ferndale High School Marching Band Ferndale, MI
- Flight IV: Godwin Heights High School Marching Band Wyoming, MI

2008

- Flight I: West Bloomfield High School Marching Band West Bloomfield, MI
- Flight II: Reeths-Puffer High School Marching Band Muskegon, MI
- Flight III: Lakeshore High School Marching Band Stevensville, MI
- Flight IV: Godwin Heights High School Marching Band Wyoming, MI

2007

- Flight I: Plymouth-Canton Marching Band Canton, MI
- Flight II: Reeths-Puffer High School Marching Band Muskegon, MI
- Flight III: Ferndale High School Marching Band Ferndale, MI
- Flight IV: Columbia Central High School Marching Band Brooklyn, MI

2006

Flight I: Plymouth-Canton Marching Band Canton, MI

Flight II: Reeths-Puffer High School Marching Band Muskegon, MI

Flight III: Ferndale High School Marching Band Ferndale, MI

Flight IV: Durand Area High School Marching Band Durand, MI

2005

Flight I: Plymouth-Canton Educational Park Marching Band Canton, MI

Flight II: Reeths-Puffer High School Marching Band Muskegon, MI

Flight III: Ferndale High School Marching Band Ferndale, MI

Flight IV: Durand Area High School Marching Band Durand, MI

2004

Flight I: Plymouth-Canton Educational Park Marching Band Canton, MI

Flight II: Jenison High School Marching Band Jenison, MI

Flight III: Ferndale High School Marching Band Ferndale, MI

Flight IV: Godwin Heights High School Marching Band Wyoming, MI

2003

Flight I: Plymouth-Canton Educational Park Marching Band Canton, MI

Flight II: Mona Shores High School Marching Band Norton Shores, MI

Flight III: Lakeshore High School Marching Band Stevensville, MI

Flight IV: Durand Area High School Marching Band Durand, MI

2002

Flight I: Plymouth-Canton Educational Park Marching Band Canton, MI

Flight II: Jenison High School Marching Band Jenison, MI

Flight III: Lakeshore High School Marching Band Stevensville, MI

Flight IV: Durand Area High School Marching Band Durand, MI

2001

Flight I: Plymouth-Canton Educational Park Marching Band Canton, MI

Flight II: Jenison High School Marching Band Jenison, MI

Flight III: Harrison High School Marching Band Farmington Hills, MI

Flight IV: Durand Area High School Marching Band Durand, MI

2000

Flight I: Plymouth-Canton Educational Park Marching Band Canton, MI

Flight II: Mona Shores High School Marching Band Norton Shores, MI

Flight III: Mt. Pleasant High School Marching Band Mt. Pleasant, MI

Flight IV: Durand Area High School Marching Band Durand, MI

1999

Flight I: Plymouth-Canton Educational Park Marching Band Canton, MI

Flight II: Mona Shores High School Marching Band Norton Shores, MI

Flight III: Harrison High School Marching Band Farmington Hills, MI

Flight IV: Durand Area High School Marching Band Durand, MI

1998

Flight I: Plymouth-Canton Educational Park Marching Band Canton, MI

Flight II: Reeths-Puffer High School Marching Band Muskegon, MI

Flight III: Mona Shores High School Marching Band Norton Shores, MI

Flight IV: Durand Area High School Marching Band Durand, MI

1997

Flight I: Plymouth-Canton Educational Park Marching Band Canton, MI

Flight II: Reeths-Puffer High School Marching Band Muskegon, MI

Flight III: Hudsonville High School Marching Band Hudsonville, MI

Flight IV: Chesaning Union High School Marching Band Chesaning, MI

1996

Flight I: Plymouth-Canton Educational Park Marching Band Canton, MI

Flight II: Lakeland High School Marching Band White Lake, MI

Flight III: Harrison High School Marching Band Farmington Hills, MI

Flight IV: Chesaning Union High School Marching Band Chesaning, MI

1995

Flight I: Plymouth-Canton Educational Park Marching Band Canton, MI

Flight II: Mona Shores High School Marching Band Muskegon, MI

Flight III: Hudsonville High School Marching Band Hudsonville, MI

Flight IV: Durand Area High School Marching Band Durand, MI

1994

Flight I: Plymouth-Canton Educational Park Marching Band Canton, MI

Flight II: Reeths-Puffer High School Marching Band Muskegon, MI

Flight III: Wyoming Park High School Marching Band Wyoming, MI

Flight IV: Algonac High School, Algonac, MI

1993

Flight I: Mona Shores High School Marching Band Muskegon, MI

Flight II: Lakeland High School, White Lake, MI

Flight III: Harrison High School Farmington Hills, MI

Flight IV: Plainwell High School, Plainwell, MI

1992

Flight I: Plymouth-Canton Educational Park Marching Band Canton, MI

Flight II: Lakeland High School Marching Band White Lake, MI

Flight III: Harrison High School Farmington Hills, MI

Flight IV: Lamphere High School Madison Heights, MI

1991

Flight I: Jenison High School Marching Band Jenison, MI

Flight II: Lakeland High School White Lake, MI

Flight III: Harrison High School Farmington Hills, MI

Flight IV: Algonac High School Marching Band Algonac, MI

1990

Flight I: Plymouth Centennial Educational Park Marching Band Canton, MI

Flight II: Linden High School Marching Band, Linden, MI

Flight III: Algonac High School Marching Band Algonac, MI

1989

Flight I: Plymouth Centennial Educational Park Marching Band Canton, MI

Flight II: Linden High School Marching Band, Linden, MI

Flight III: Hartford Indian Emerald Vanguard, Hartford HS, Hartford, MI

1988

Flight I: Plymouth Centennial Educational Park Marching Band, Canton, MI

Flight II: Linden High School Marching Band, Linden, MI

Flight III: Montrose Marching Band, Hill-McCloy HS, Montrose, MI

1987

Flight I: Flushing High School, Flushing, MI

Flight II: Linden High School Marching Band, Linden, MI

Flight III: Petoskey High School, Petoskey, MI

1986

Flight I: Plymouth Centennial Educational Park Marching Band, Canton, MI

Flight II: Flushing High School, Flushing, MI

Flight III: Linden High School, Linden, MI

1985

Flight I: Plymouth Centennial Educational Park Marching Band, Canton, MI

Flight II: Montrose Marching Band, Montrose, MI

Flight III: Petoskey High School, Petoskey, MI

1984

Flight I: Plymouth Centennial Educational Park Marching Band, Canton, MI

Flight II: Flushing High School, Flushing, MI

Flight III: St. Charles High School, St. Charles, MI

1983

Flight Open: Wyoming Park High School, Wyoming, MI

Flight I: Durand Area High School, Durand, MI

Flight II: Montrose High School, Montrose, MI

Flight III: Tawas Area High School, Tawas, MI

1982

Flight Open: Flushing High School, Flushing, MI

Flight I: Durand Area High School, Durand, MI

Flight II: Montrose High School, Montrose, MI

Flight III: RECAP MISSING

1981

- Flight Open: Flushing High School, Flushing, MI
- Flight I: Durand Area High School, Durand, MI
- Flight II: Montrose High School, Montrose, MI
- Flight III: Tawas Area High School, Tawas, MI

1980

- Flight Open: Flushing High School, Flushing, MI
- Flight I: Durand Area High School, Durand, MI
- Flight II: Montrose High School, Montrose, MI
- Flight III: Tawas Area High School, Tawas, MI
