= Jenison (surname) =

Jenison is a surname. Notable people with the surname include:

- Edward H. Jenison (1907–1996), American politician
- Madge Jenison (1874–1960), American author, activist and bookstore owner
- Matthew Jenison (1654–1734), British politician
- Ralph Jenison (1696–1758), British politician
- Robert Jenison (1584?–1652), English Puritan cleric and academic
