= Bodman PLC =

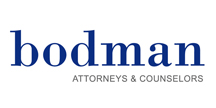
- Headquarters: Ford Field; Detroit, Michigan
- No. of offices: 4
- No. of attorneys: More than 160
- Major practice areas: Banking, Corporate/M&A, Litigation and ADR, Real Estate, High Net Worth, Bankruptcy
- Key people: Carrie Leahy, Chair
- Date founded: 1929
- Founder: Wallace R. Middleton and Clifford B. Longley
- Company type: Professional Limited Liability Company
- Website: www.bodmanlaw.com

Bodman PLC is a business law firm headquartered in Ford Field, located in downtown Detroit, Michigan. Founded in 1929 by two former Ford Motor Company lawyers, Wallace R. Middleton and Clifford B. Longley, the firm is one of the state’s largest, with more than 160 lawyers in four offices: Ann Arbor, Detroit, Grand Rapids, and Troy.

Bodman has long been known for its close associations with the automotive and financial services industries and for its long-term relationships with significant clients. For example, the firm has maintained a continuous client relationship with members of the Ford family since 1929 and with Comerica Incorporated since it assisted in the formation of Manufacturer's National Bank, which later merged with Comerica, in 1933. The firm represents more than 80 financial institutions in Michigan and across the U.S. as well as Tier-1, -2 and -3 automotive suppliers and OEMs on a national and international basis.

== Honors ==
Chambers USA ranks Bodman as one of Michigan's leading law firms in six of the eight practices areas it evaluates in Michigan, including “Band 1 Ranking" for Banking and Finance and for Bankruptcy/Restructuring. Other Bodman practice areas ranked in Chambers USA are Corporate/M&A, Commercial Litigation, Real Estate and Labor & Employment. Chambers HNW also ranks Bodman in "Band 1" for legal services to high net worth individuals. Benchmark: Litigation ranks Bodman as “highly recommended” for commercial litigation, which is that publication’s highest ranking.

Bodman has an extensive pro bono program and has received “Law Firm of the Year” honors from Legal Aid and Defender Association and from Michigan Community Resources for its commitment in this area. The State Bar of Michigan has also included Bodman on its 2023 State Bar of Michigan Pro Bono Honor Roll.

The Detroit Free Press recognized Bodman as one of the "top workplaces" of southeast Michigan for 2016. The firm was honored in 2010, 2015, and again in 2017 as a "Diversity Focused Company" for inclusiveness and promoting community service, in addition to receiving the "Going Green Award from Corp! Magazine for its sustainable business practices.
