= Ford Field =

Stadium in Detroit, Michigan

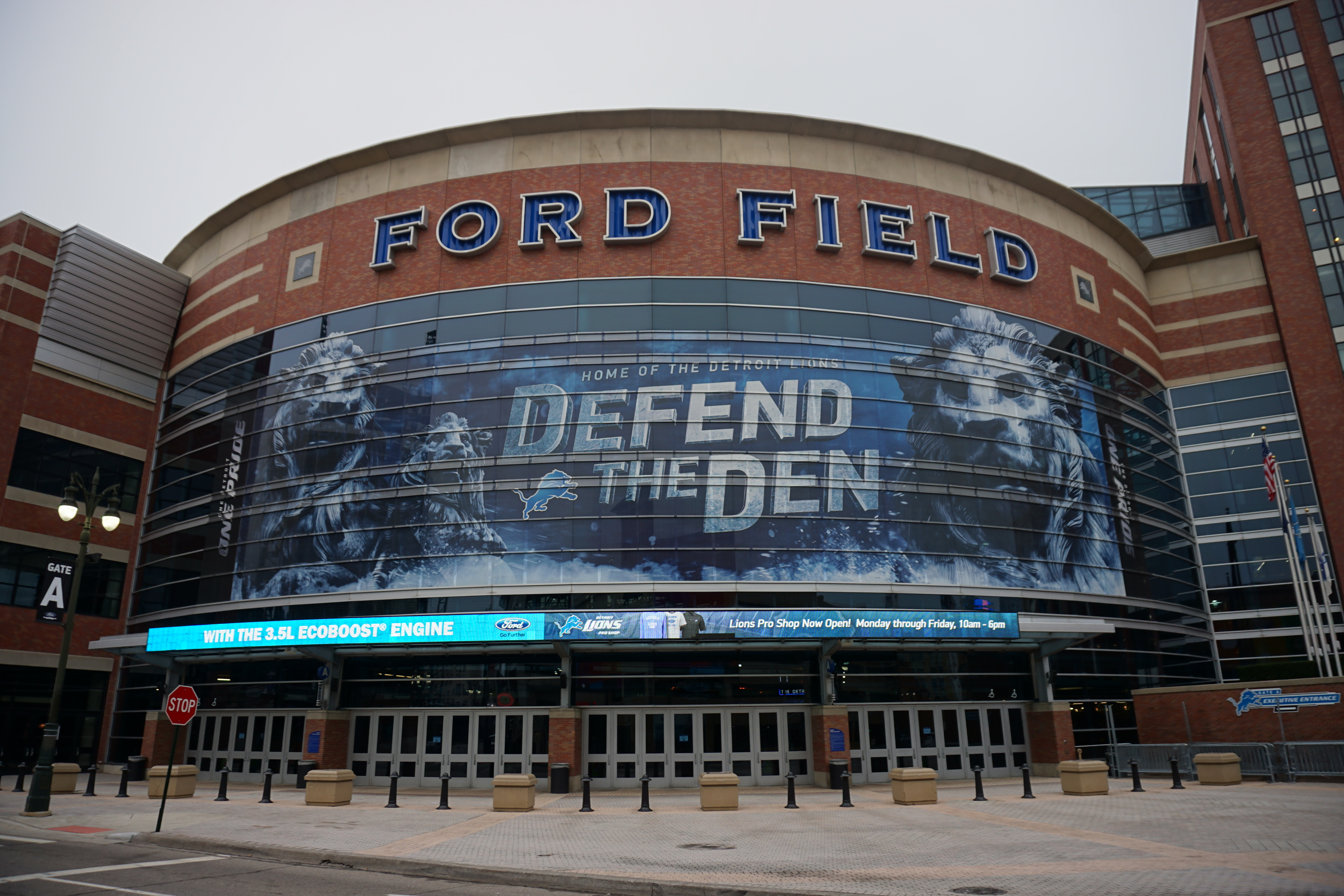
- Ford Field's Brush Street atrium in 2015

- Location in Wayne County, Michigan Location in Michigan Location in the United States
- Address: 2000 Brush Street
- Location: Detroit, Michigan, U.S.
- Coordinates: 42°20′24″N 83°2′44″W
- Owner: Detroit/Wayne County Stadium Authority
- Operator: Detroit Lions
- Capacity: Football: 65,000; Basketball: 78,000
- Roof: Dome
- Surface: FieldTurf
- Record attendance: WrestleMania 23 (80,103)
- Public transit: Broadway; Grand Circus Park Montcalm Street; SMART FAST; DDOT 6

Construction
- Groundbreaking: November 16, 1999; 27 years ago
- Opened: August 24, 2002; 24 years ago
- Renovated: 2017
- Cost: US$500 million ($895 million in 2025 dollars)
- Architects: Rossetti Architects; Hamilton Anderson Associates, Inc. Kaplan, McLaughlin, Diaz Architects
- Project manager: Hammes Company
- Structural engineer: Thornton Tomasetti
- Services engineer: SmithGroup
- General contractor: Hunt/Jenkins/White/Olson JV

Tenants
- Detroit Lions (NFL) (2002–present); Little Caesars Pizza Bowl (NCAA) (2002–2013); GameAbove Sports Bowl (NCAA) (2014–2025); Michigan Panthers (UFL) (2023–2025); Philadelphia Stars (USFL) (2023)

Website
- fordfield.com

Ford Field is an indoor stadium in Detroit, Michigan, U.S. It primarily serves as the home of the Detroit Lions of the National Football League (NFL), the Mid-American Conference championship game, the annual state championship football games for the MHSAA, the MHSAA State Wrestling Championships, and the MCBA Marching Band State Finals, among other events. It was also the home of the Michigan Panthers of the United Football League (UFL) from 2023 to 2025. The regular seating capacity is approximately 65,000, though it is expandable up to 70,000 for football and 80,000 for basketball.

The naming rights were purchased by the Ford Motor Company for $40 million over 20 years; the Ford family holds a controlling interest in the company, and they have controlled ownership of the Lions franchise since 1964.

== History ==
=== Planning and construction ===
In 1975, the Lions moved to the Pontiac Silverdome after playing at Tiger Stadium from 1938 to 1939 and 1941 to 1974. By the mid-1990s, they began exploring the possibility of returning to the city of Detroit in order to build a new stadium. On August 20, 1996, the Lions announced their intention to build a new stadium in Downtown Detroit. On November 5, voters approved a referendum for the stadium.

Groundbreaking for the stadium occurred on November 16, 1999, as part of a downtown revitalization plan for the city of Detroit, which included Comerica Park. Full excavation and construction began on February 1, 2000, after the final legal agreements were settled on January 21. On March 27, Gary Brown, project manager for the Downtown Development Authority (DDA) and Detroit/Wayne County Stadium Authority, announced that caissons for the concourse was 60 percent completed and the foundations would be finished in several weeks. It was also announced that partial demolition of the Hudson's warehouse had been approved. In April of the same year, Huber Hunt & Nichols and Jenkins Construction won the contract to build the stadium. Under the partnership, Huber Hunt & Nichols was awarded 75 percent of the contract while Jenkins Construction received the remaining 25 percent.

== Design ==
The stadium's design incorporates a former Hudson's warehouse, which was constructed in the 1920s. The warehouse was converted to office space and currently has Campbell Ewald and Bodman as tenants.

The presence of the warehouse allows for a seating arrangement that is unique among professional American football stadiums. The majority of suites are located in the warehouse along the stadium's southern sideline, as are the lounges that serve the premium club seats on that side of the field. The bulk of the grandstand seats are located along the northern sideline and both end-lines, with gaps in the stadium's upper half at the southwest and southeast corners. The upper deck on the stadium's northern sideline also contains one level of suites and a smaller section of club seating. A similar design was implemented at the renovated Soldier Field, albeit with the use of a new structure (as opposed to an existing building) to house four levels of suites.

Unlike most prior domed stadiums, Ford Field allows a large amount of natural light to reach the field, thanks to immense skylights and large glass windows at the open corners. The windows along the ceiling are frosted to mimic the automotive factories that are prevalent in Metro Detroit. The south entrance provides the seating bowl and concourse with sunlight year-round and also offers fans a view of downtown Detroit. To prevent the stadium from becoming an overly imposing presence in the Detroit skyline, the playing field is 45 feet (14 m) below street level, similar to the design at adjacent Comerica Park.

Ford Field is one of the few venues in the NFL that has end zones in the east and the west. There is no NFL rule for field construction in roofed venues regarding sunlight distracting players on the field. The east–west end zone design accommodated the Hudson warehouse location. The natural light is not a distraction to the players in a day game, because the light only reaches as far as the sidelines, leaving the field still properly lit with the combination of artificial stadium lighting and sunlight.

In 2017, Ford Field underwent its first major renovation. The $100 million renovation included new video boards, a new sound system, updated suites, and the renovation of multiple restaurants, clubs, and bars on the property.

== Major events ==
=== Football ===
Ford Field hosted Super Bowl XL on February 5, 2006, as the Pittsburgh Steelers defeated the Seattle Seahawks, 21–10 to win their fifth Super Bowl championship in front of 68,206 in attendance. It also marked the final game in the 13-year career for Steelers running back, and Detroit native, Jerome Bettis.

The stadium was home to the Little Caesars Pizza Bowl sponsored by Detroit-based Little Caesars (previously known as the Motor City Bowl and jointly sponsored by the Big Three automakers headquartered in Detroit – Chrysler, Ford, and General Motors) from 2002 until 2013. It featured a top Mid-American Conference (MAC) team and a Big Ten Conference team. The Little Caesars Pizza Bowl was replaced by the Quick Lane Bowl (later known as the GameAbove Sports Bowl), running from 2014 to 2025. It has also hosted the annual MAC Football Championship Game since 2004.

Ford Field has been the site of several neutral site regular season college football games, including Western Michigan vs. Illinois in 2008 and Michigan State vs. Florida Atlantic in 2010. Central Michigan was set to play Western Michigan at Ford Field on October 17, 2020, before the football season for the conference were cancelled due to the COVID-19 pandemic. Penn State and Michigan State played a neutral field regular season game on November 24, 2023, a Black Friday game televised by NBC in primetime. Penn State won the game 42–0. Michigan State played another game at Ford Field against Maryland on November 29, 2025.

On December 13, 2010, the Minnesota Vikings played a home game at Ford Field against the New York Giants after the Hubert H. Humphrey Metrodome's inflatable roof collapsed due to a rip in the roofing material caused by heavy snow accumulation. The roof failure forced the already postponed game to be moved elsewhere, and after deliberations, the NFL chose Ford Field. It was the first ever regular season Monday night game played at Ford Field, and one of the few instances where a team played an unofficial home game at another (rival) team's home field. The Lions hosted their first ever Monday Night Football game in Ford Field on October 10, 2011, against the Chicago Bears.

A Buffalo Bills home game against the New York Jets was played at Ford Field on November 24, 2014, after a major lake effect snowstorm hit western New York, causing the game to be moved from Ralph Wilson Stadium. The Bills won the game 38–3. A similar scenario took place on November 20, 2022, when the Bills' home game against the Cleveland Browns was also moved to Ford Field. The Bills won the game 31–23.

On December 3, 2015, Ford Field was the site of the Miracle in Motown, where on the final play of regulation between the Lions and Green Bay Packers on Thursday Night Football, with no time remaining on the game clock and Detroit leading 23–21, Packers quarterback Aaron Rodgers threw a 61-yard (56 m) Hail Mary pass into the end zone that was caught by tight end Richard Rodgers for the game-winning touchdown. The play resulted in a dramatic 27–23 come-from-behind victory for the Packers. According to the Elias Sports Bureau, it is the longest game-winning Hail Mary in NFL history.

The Lions hosted their first playoff game at Ford Field against the Los Angeles Rams on January 14, 2024. The Lions won the game 24–23. The Lions hosted their second playoff game at Ford Field against the Tampa Bay Buccaneers on January 21, 2024. The Lions won the game 31–23.

=== Basketball ===
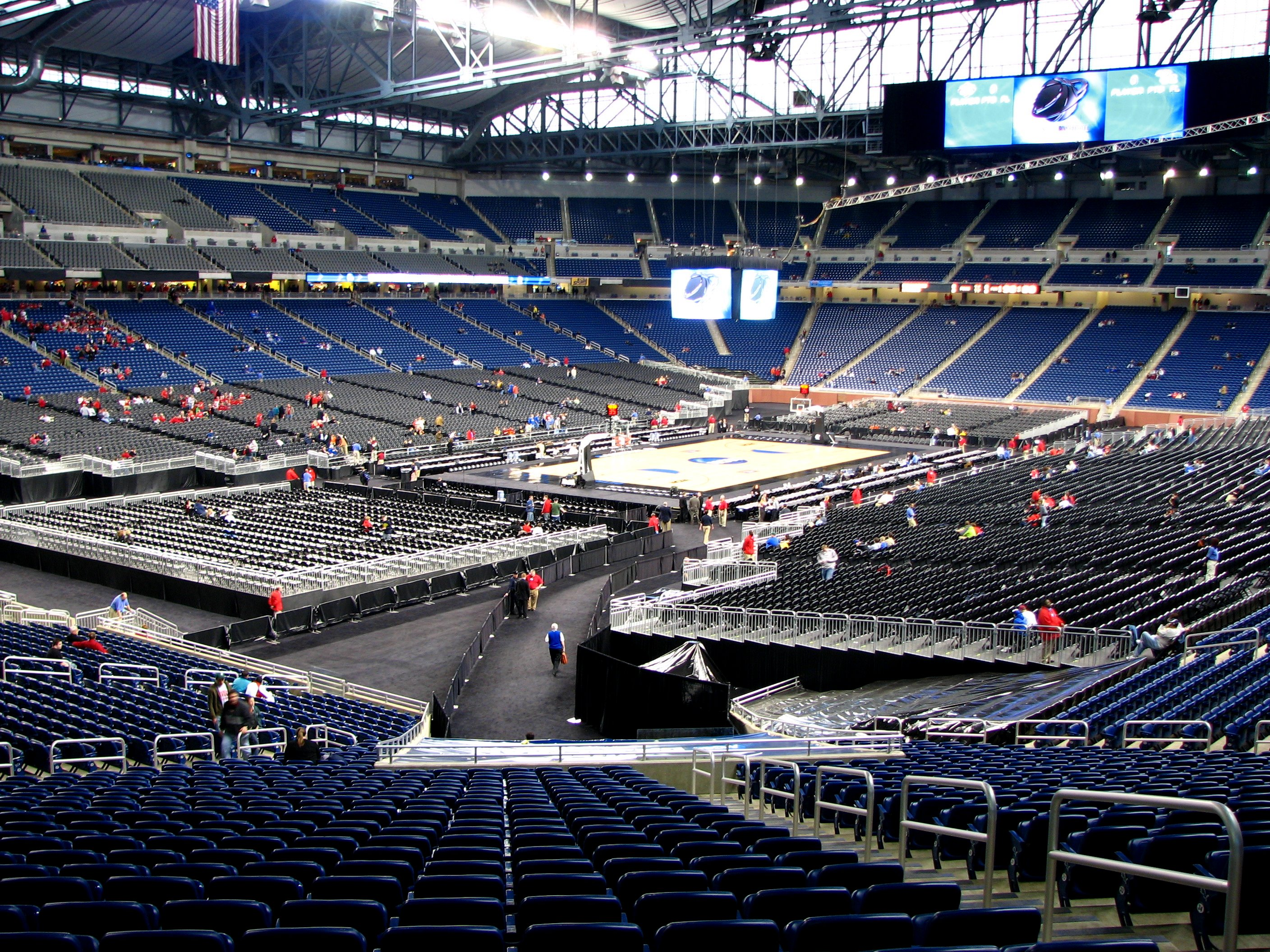
Ford Field is transformed into a basketball arena in preparation for the 2008 Midwest Regional Finals.

On December 13, 2003, Ford Field hosted the then largest crowd ever to attend a basketball game, as 78,129 people packed the stadium for the Basketbowl, where the Kentucky Wildcats defeated the Michigan State Spartans, 79–74.

The University of Detroit Mercy and Ford Field hosted the 2008 NCAA basketball tournament regional semifinal and final games (March 28 and 30). Ford Field was the site of the 2009 Final Four (April 4 and 6). For the 2008 NCAA basketball tournament, the court was placed in the center of the football field rather than in an end of the stadium. This was the first time this configuration was used for NCAA Tournament play with the new 70,000-seat capacity rule in effect. Ford Field will host the Final Four again in 2027 (April 3 and 5).

=== College hockey ===
The 2010 Frozen Four was held at Ford Field on April 8 and 10 with Boston College defeating Wisconsin to win the championship. This has been the only time NCAA hockey has used a football stadium for the championship (inspired in part by their college basketball counterparts) and resulted in the largest attendance (37,592) at a Frozen Four event.

=== High school competitions ===
Ford Field has hosted the MHSAA football state championships since 2005. It also hosted the MHSAA individual wrestling state finals in 2018.

The stadium also hosts the MCBA finals, where Michigan high school marching bands compete to be the best in the state.

=== Soccer ===
Ford Field hosted two group stage matches of the 2011 CONCACAF Gold Cup soccer tournament on June 7, 2011. Panama played Guadeloupe in the first match, while the United States played Canada in the second match.

Date	Winning Team	Result	Losing Team	Tournament	Spectators
December 17, 2008	United States women	1–0	China women	Women's International Friendly	11,933
June 7, 2011	Panama	3–2	Guadeloupe	2011 CONCACAF Gold Cup Group C	28,209
June 7, 2011	United States	2–0	Canada	2011 CONCACAF Gold Cup Group C	28,209
December 8, 2012	United States women	2–0	China women	Women's International Friendly	17,371
September 17, 2015	United States women	5–0	Haiti women	Women's International Friendly	34,538

In 2016, Dan Gilbert and Tom Gores announced a bid for a Major League Soccer expansion franchise, first looking at building a new open-air stadium in downtown Detroit, then focusing on playing at Ford Field, which would be retrofitted with a retractable roof. However, in 2018, Gilbert and Gores and the Ford family would "not move forward with this proposed retrofit, because the risks that would inhere to such an undertaking would substantially outweigh the rewards".

=== Other competitions ===
The Professional Bull Riders brought their Built Ford Tough Series tour to Ford Field for the first time on March 10, 2012. Ford Field is the second Detroit area venue the BFTS had visited; they had visited The Palace of Auburn Hills in 2001, 2006 and 2007.

The United States Hot Rod Association (USHRA) holds multiple Monster Jam Monster Truck races at Ford Field. These races were previously held in the Pontiac Silverdome until it was closed. AMA Supercross Championship, also a Feld Entertainment competition, has competed at Ford Field from 2006 to 2008 and 2014 to 2017.

=== Other events ===
On April 1, 2007, Ford Field hosted WWE's WrestleMania 23. This event set a Ford Field attendance record of 80,103. It was the first WrestleMania held in the Detroit area since 93,173 fans set a world indoor attendance record at the Pontiac Silverdome for WrestleMania III in 1987. WWE returned to the venue for SummerSlam on August 5, 2023.

Ford Field hosted the Society for Academic Emergency Medicine (SAEM) Midwest Regional in 2007 and 2014.

In 2015, Ford Field housed the large group gatherings of the ELCA Youth Gathering.

On November 18, 2017, Ford Field hosted the Beatification Mass of Fr. Solanus Casey, a Capuchin Franciscan Friar who ministered at the nearby St. Bonaventure Monastery on Mt. Elliott. The near-capacity crowd was one of the largest Catholic masses in Detroit history.

Ford Field hosted the FIRST Championship in 2018 and 2019 along with the nearby Cobo Center. The 2020 event was cancelled due to the COVID-19 pandemic.

=== Concerts ===
Date	Artist(s)	Supporting act(s)	Tour	Attendance	Revenue	Note(s)	Ref(s)
October 12, 2002	The Rolling Stones	No Doubt	Licks Tour			This was the first concert at the stadium.	
July 12, 2003	Eminem	50 Cent; Missy Elliott		95,709 / 96,707	$5,257,000		
July 13, 2003	Eminem	50 Cent; Missy Elliott		95,709 / 96,707	$5,257,000		
February 5, 2006	The Rolling Stones		A Bigger Bang	68,206		This concert was a part of Super Bowl XL.	
April 7, 2006	Delirious?	Tim Hughes; Reuben Morgan	The Mission Bell Tour			The band used Paul Evans as a stand-in drummer instead of regular drummer Stew Smith, who stayed at home to be with his family.	
April 8, 2006	Delirious?	Tim Hughes; Reuben Morgan	The Mission Bell Tour			The band used Paul Evans as a stand-in drummer instead of regular drummer Stew Smith, who stayed at home to be with his family.	
August 26, 2006	Kenny Chesney	Dierks Bentley; Carrie Underwood	The Road & The Radio Tour	44,836 / 44,836	$3,408,357		
August 18, 2007	Kenny Chesney	Brooks & Dunn	Flip Flop Summer 2007 Tour	47,470 / 47,470	$4,112,541		
August 2, 2008	Kenny Chesney	Keith Urban; LeAnn Rimes; Gary Allan; Luke Bryan	Poets & Pirates Tour	46,871 / 48,194	$3,931,995		
November 18, 2008	Madonna		Sticky & Sweet Tour	30,119 / 30,119	$2,395,900		
August 22, 2009	Kenny Chesney	Miranda Lambert; Lady Antebellum; Sugarland; Montgomery Gentry	Sun City Carnival Tour	49,215 / 49,215	$3,843,639		
January 15, 2011	Kid Rock	Ty Stone; Jamey Johnson	Born Free Tour			This concert was part of his 40th birthday party. Among the guests were Uncle Kracker, Peter Wolfe, Reverend Run, Sheryl Crow, Cindy Crawford, Jimmie Johnson, and Anita Baker.	
June 11, 2011	Taylor Swift	Needtobreathe; Frankie Ballard; Randy Montana	Speak Now World Tour	47,992 / 47,992	$3,453,549		
August 20, 2011	Kenny Chesney; Zac Brown Band	Billy Currington; Uncle Kracker	Goin' Coastal Tour	48,225 / 48,225	$4,169,719		
August 18, 2012	Kenny Chesney; Tim McGraw	Jake Owen; Grace Potter & The Nocturnals	Brothers of the Sun Tour	48,943 / 48,943	$4,560,108		
May 4, 2013	Taylor Swift	Ed Sheeran; Austin Mahone; Brett Eldredge	The Red Tour	48,265 / 48,265	$3,969,059		
July 18, 2013	Bon Jovi	The J. Geils Band	Because We Can	43,142 / 43,142	$2,638,975		
August 6, 2013	Justin Timberlake; Jay-Z	DJ Cassidy	Legend of the Summer Stadium Tour	42,035 / 42,035	$3,968,119		
August 17, 2013	Kenny Chesney; Eric Church	Eli Young Band; Kacey Musgraves	No Shoes Nation Tour	45,839 / 45,839	$3,733,711		
August 16, 2014	One Direction	5 Seconds of Summer	Where We Are Tour	92,428 / 92,428	$8,304,416	During the August 16 performance, the band performed a cover of "Teenage Dirtbag" by Wheatus.	
August 17, 2014	One Direction	5 Seconds of Summer	Where We Are Tour	92,428 / 92,428	$8,304,416	During the August 16 performance, the band performed a cover of "Teenage Dirtbag" by Wheatus.	
May 30, 2015	Taylor Swift	Vance Joy; Shawn Mendes	The 1989 World Tour	50,703 / 50,703	$5,999,690	Dan Reynolds of Imagine Dragons, Martha Hunt & Gigi Hadid were special guests.	
August 22, 2015	Kenny Chesney; Eric Church	Brantley Gilbert; Chase Rice; Old Dominion	The Big Revival Tour	49,285 / 49,285	$4,903,524	Lions quarterback Matthew Stafford made a surprise appearance.	
August 29, 2015	One Direction	Icona Pop	On The Road Again Tour	42,767 / 42,767	$2,700,684	This concert took place on Liam Payne's 22nd birthday.	
September 8, 2015	AC/DC	Vintage Trouble	Rock Or Bust World Tour	43,000 / 43,000			
October 30, 2015	Luke Bryan	Florida Georgia Line; Randy Houser; Thomas Rhett; Dustin Lynch	Kick the Dust Up Tour	44,004 / 44,004	$3,760,515		
June 14, 2016	Beyoncé	DJ Khaled	The Formation World Tour	41,524 / 41,524	$5,471,395	This concert was originally scheduled to take place on May 29, 2016, but was rescheduled due to "scheduling changes". During the show, she dedicated "Halo" to the victims affected by the Orlando nightclub shooting.	
June 23, 2016	Guns N' Roses	Alice in Chains	Not in This Lifetime... Tour	44,439 / 44,439	$4,776,766		
August 13, 2016	Kenny Chesney	Miranda Lambert; Jake Owen; Old Dominion	Spread the Love Tour	45,938 / 46,984	$3,807,637	Kid Rock made a surprise appearance.	
October 29, 2016	Luke Bryan	Little Big Town; Dustin Lynch	Kill the Lights Tour	39,573 / 45,000	$3,418,006		
September 3, 2017	U2	Beck	The Joshua Tree Tour 2017	42,905 / 42,905	$4,936,605	Special appearance by Patti Smith at the end of the Joshua Tree portion of the set during "Mothers of the Disappeared."	
August 4, 2018	Kenny Chesney	Thomas Rhett; Old Dominion; Brandon Lay	The Trip Around the Sun Tour	48,826 / 48,826	$4,968,563		
August 13, 2018	Beyoncé; Jay-Z	Chloe X Halle and DJ Khaled	On the Run II Tour	43,699 / 43,699	$5,310,376		
August 28, 2018	Taylor Swift	Camila Cabello; Charli XCX	Taylor Swift's Reputation Stadium Tour	49,464 / 49,464	$6,597,852		
September 8, 2018	Ed Sheeran	Snow Patrol; Anne-Marie	÷ Tour (Note: Pronounced The Divide Tour.)	47,804 / 47,804	$4,481,290		
October 26, 2018	Luke Bryan	Sam Hunt; Jon Pardi; Morgan Wallen	What Makes You Country Tour				
October 25, 2019	Luke Bryan	Cole Swindell; Jon Langston; DJ Rock	Sunset Repeat Tour				
February 22, 2020	Garth Brooks	Chase Rice	The Garth Brooks Stadium Tour	70,000 / 70,000	$6,193,800		
November 15, 2021	The Rolling Stones	Ayron Jones	No Filter Tour	40,250 / 40,250	$8,289,779		
July 27, 2022	The Weeknd	Kaytranada; Mike Dean	After Hours til Dawn Stadium Tour	45,609 / 45,609	$4,985,501		
August 20, 2022	Kenny Chesney	Dan + Shay; Old Dominion; Carly Pearce	Here and Now Tour	49,725 / 49,725	$5,622,738		
April 22, 2023	Luke Combs	Riley Green; Lainey Wilson; Flatland Cavalry; Brent Cobb	Luke Combs World Tour	52,783 / 52,783			
June 9, 2023	Taylor Swift	Girl in Red; Gracie Abrams	The Eras Tour	118,661 / 118,661			
June 10, 2023	Taylor Swift	Girl in Red; OWENN	The Eras Tour	118,661 / 118,661			
June 29, 2023	Morgan Wallen	Bailey Zimmerman; ERNEST; HARDY	One Night at a Time World Tour				
June 30, 2023	Morgan Wallen	Bailey Zimmerman; ERNEST; HARDY	One Night at a Time World Tour				
July 15, 2023	Ed Sheeran	Khalid	+–=÷× Tour (Note: Pronounced The Mathematics Tour.)	70,372 / 70,372	$7,126,417	Eminem made a surprise appearance to perform "Lose Yourself" and "Stan".	
July 26, 2023	Beyoncé		Renaissance World Tour	44,554 / 44,554	$9,963,756	Highest-grossing boxscore report in the stadium's history.	
November 10, 2023	Metallica	Pantera; Mammoth WVH	M72 World Tour	128,779 / 128,779	$13,866,856		
November 12, 2023	Metallica	Five Finger Death Punch; Ice Nine Kills	M72 World Tour	128,779 / 128,779	$13,866,856		
June 20, 2024	Zach Bryan	Jason Isbell and The 400 Unit; Levi Turner	Quittin Time Tour	46,510 / 46,510			
July 13, 2024	George Strait	Chris Stapleton; Little Big Town		47,065			
August 10, 2024	Kenny Chesney; Zac Brown Band	Megan Moroney; Uncle Kracker	Sun Goes Down 2024 Tour				
April 30, 2025	AC/DC	The Pretty Reckless	Power Up Tour				
May 18, 2025	Post Malone; Jelly Roll	Sierra Ferrell	Big Ass Stadium Tour	47,917 / 47,917		Eminem made a surprise appearance while Jelly Roll performed "Lose Yourself".	
May 24, 2025	The Weeknd	Playboi Carti; Mike Dean	After Hours til Dawn Tour				
May 25, 2025	The Weeknd	Playboi Carti; Mike Dean	After Hours til Dawn Tour				
June 10, 2025	Kendrick Lamar; SZA	Mustard	Grand National Tour				
August 7, 2025	Chris Brown	Summer Walker; Bryson Tiller	Breezy Bowl XX Tour				
August 8, 2025	Chris Brown	Summer Walker; Bryson Tiller	Breezy Bowl XX Tour				
May 9, 2026	Bruno Mars	DJ Pee .Wee; Leon Thomas; Victoria Monét; Raye	The Romantic Tour			A second show was added.	
May 10, 2026	Bruno Mars	DJ Pee .Wee; Leon Thomas; Victoria Monét; Raye	The Romantic Tour			A second show was added.	
July 2, 2026	Usher; Chris Brown		The R&B Tour				
July 3, 2026	Usher; Chris Brown		The R&B Tour				
August 6, 2026	Foo Fighters	Queens of the Stone Age	Take Cover Tour				
August 8, 2026	Chris Stapleton	Lainey Wilson; Allen Stone	All-American Road Show				
August 29, 2026	Ed Sheeran	Myles Smith; Lukas Graham; Biird	Loop Tour				

== Photo gallery ==
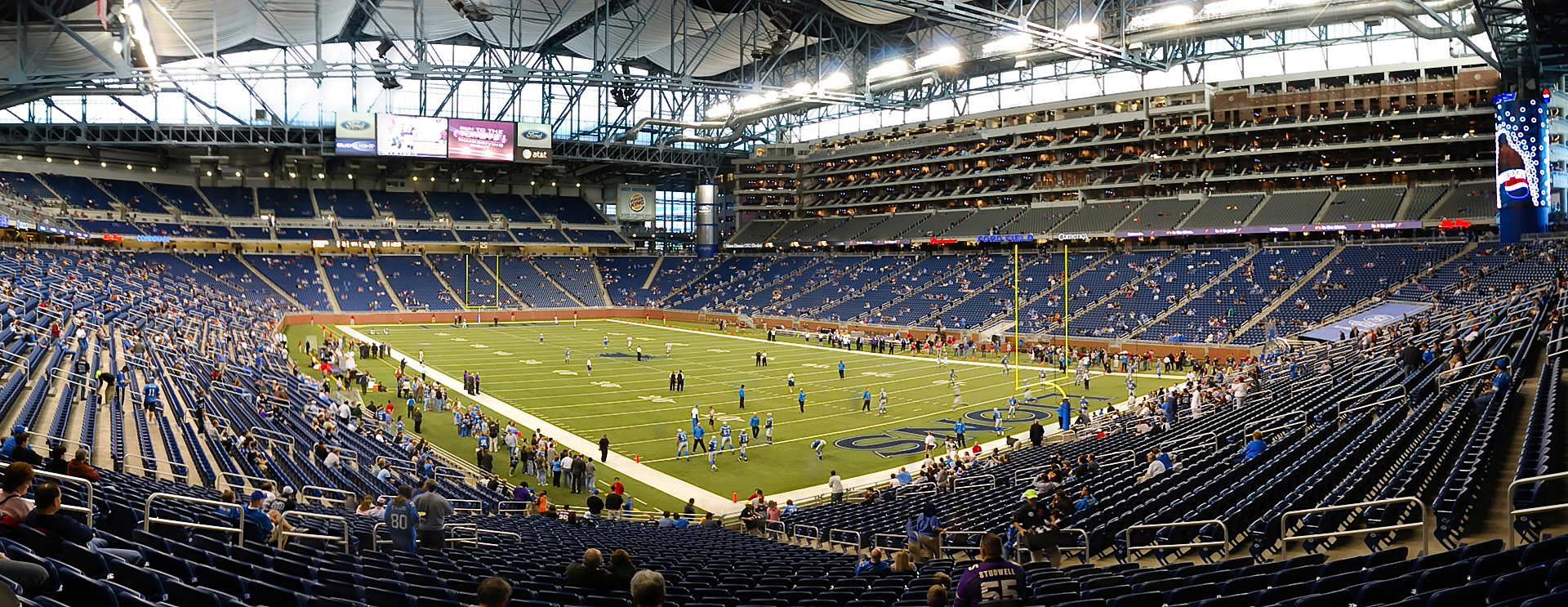
A wide angle view of Ford Field before a Detroit Lions game.

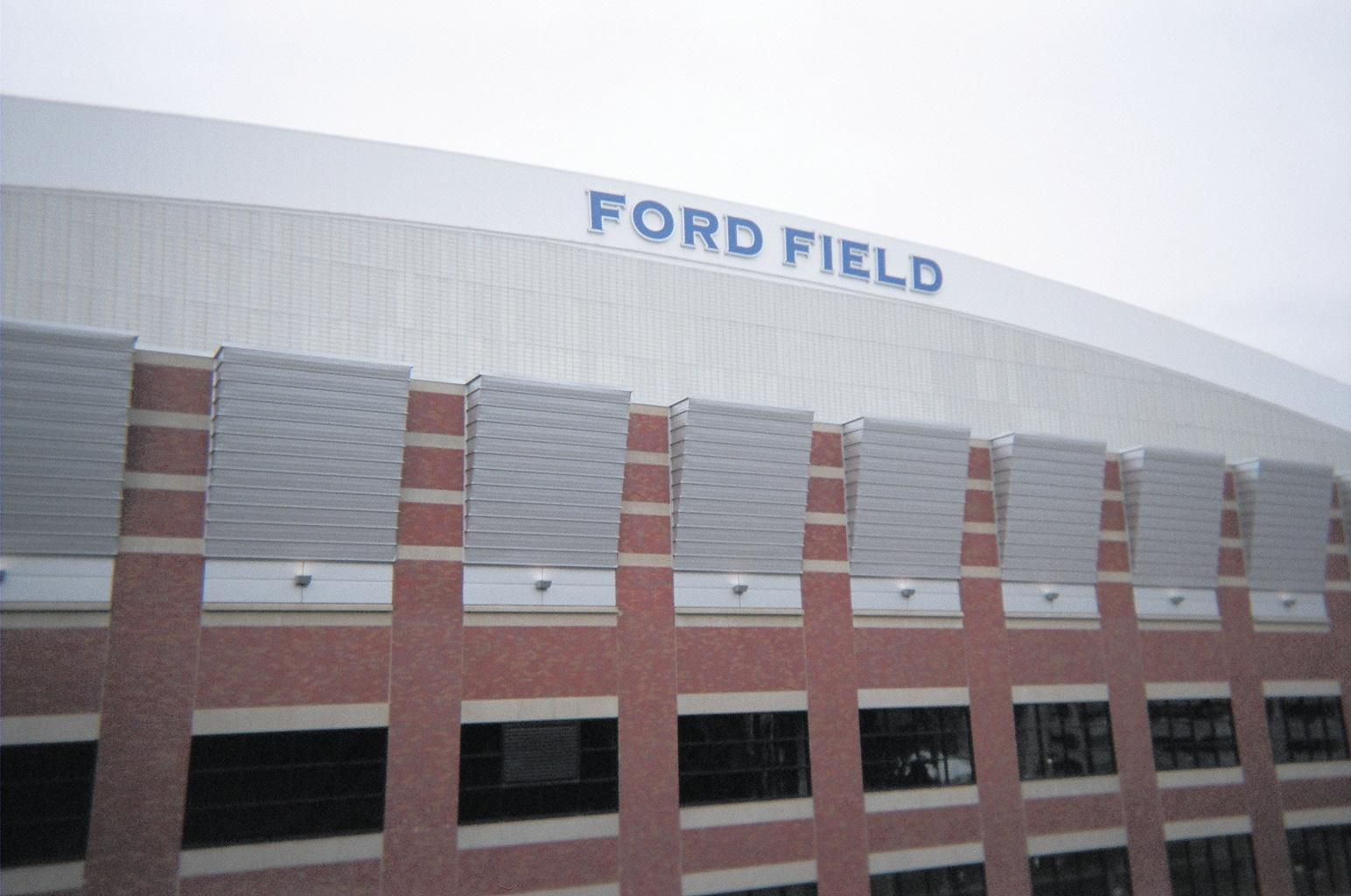
Ford Field allows natural light to penetrate through gray translucent roof panels.

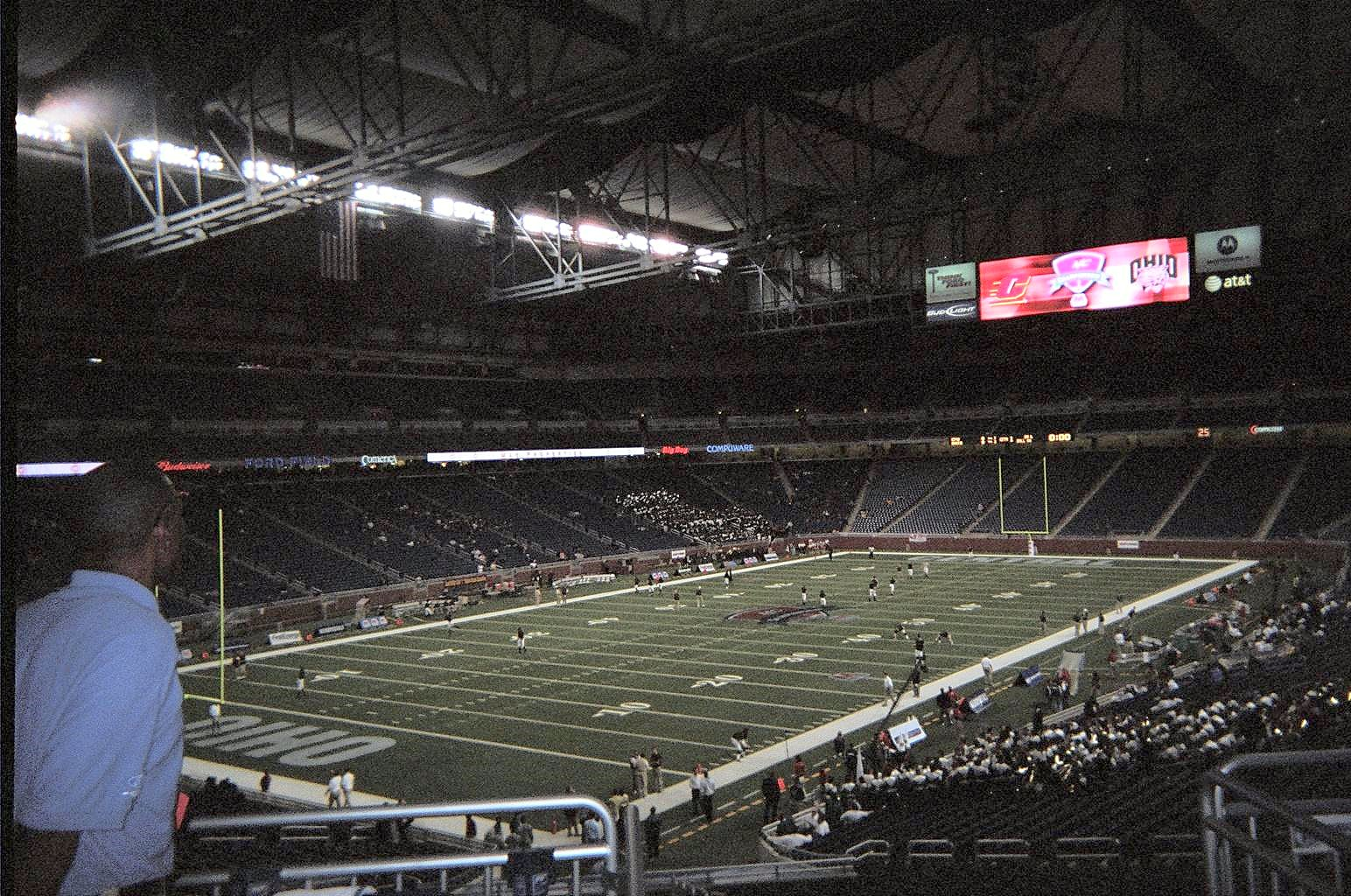
Before the 2006 MAC Championship game.

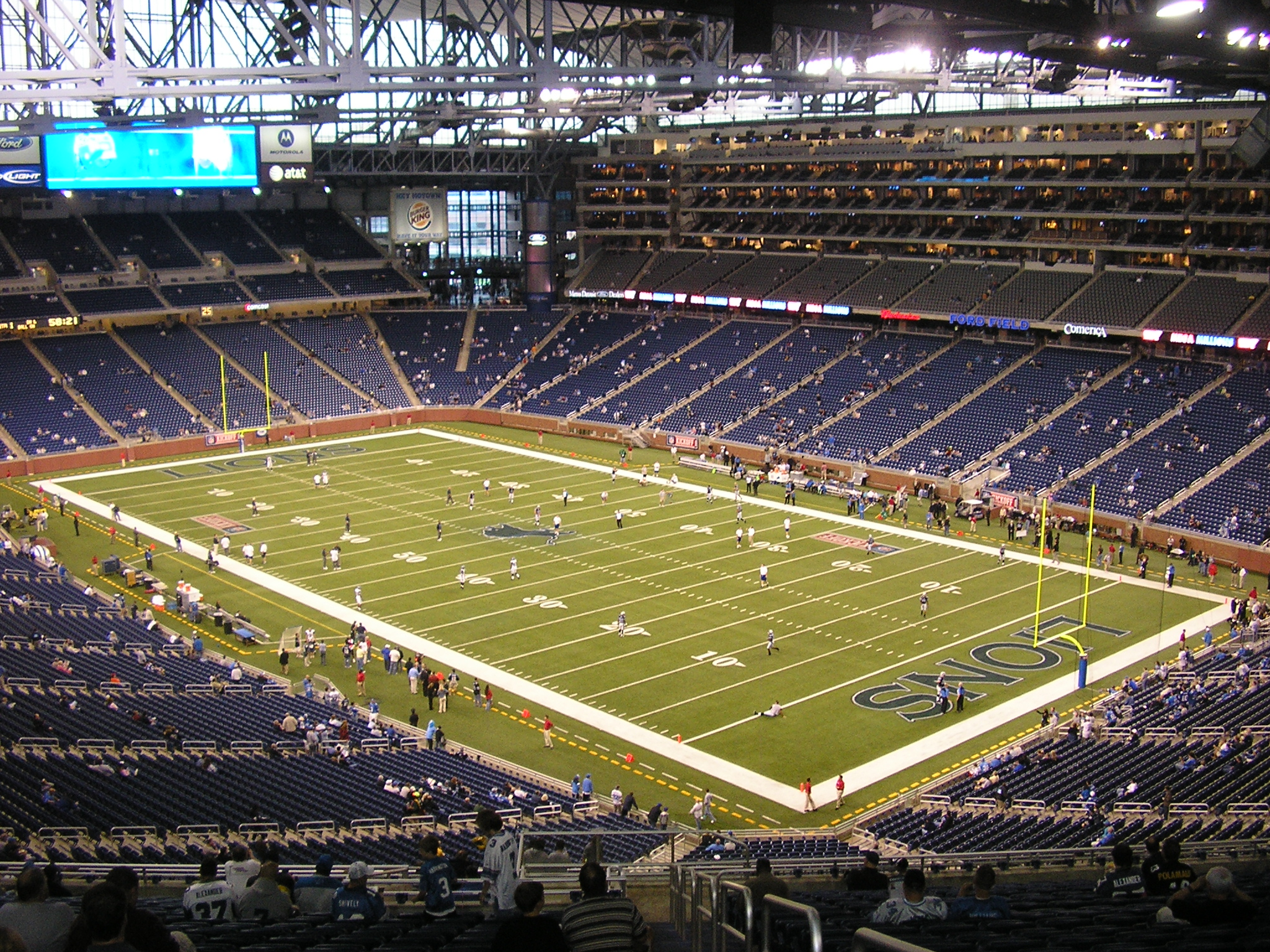
Ford Field playing surface.

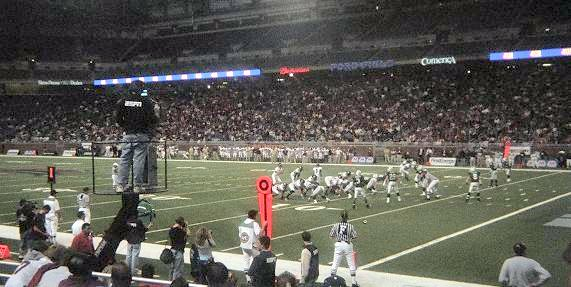
2006 MAC Championship: Central Michigan vs. Ohio.

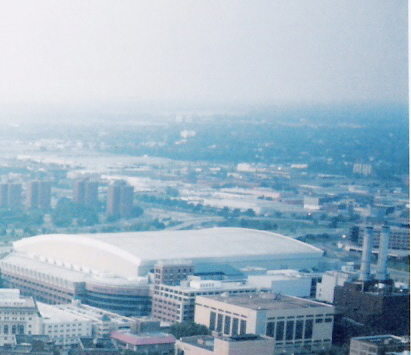
Aerial view of Ford Field.

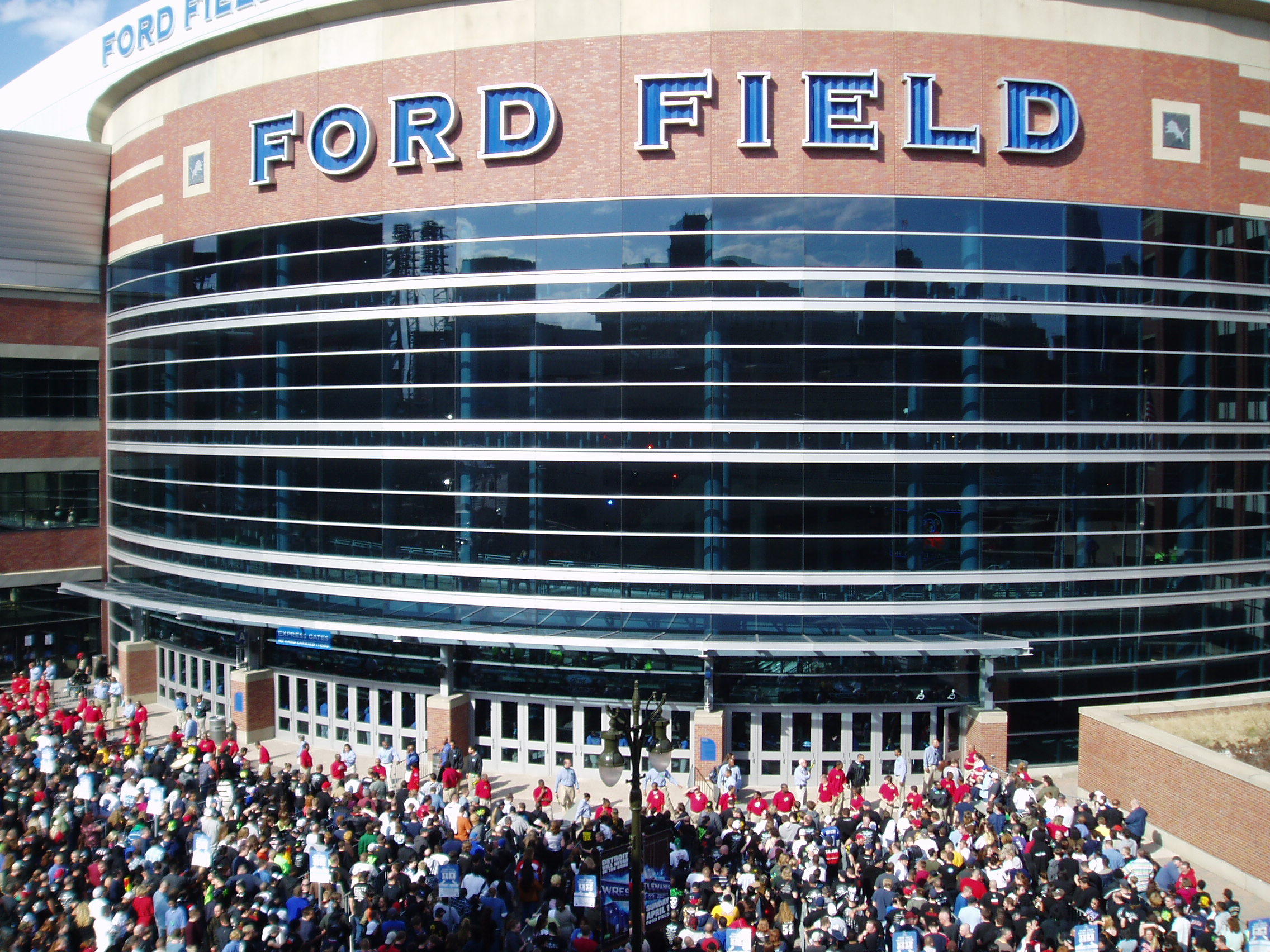
Thousands wait to enter Ford Field for WrestleMania 23 on April 1, 2007.

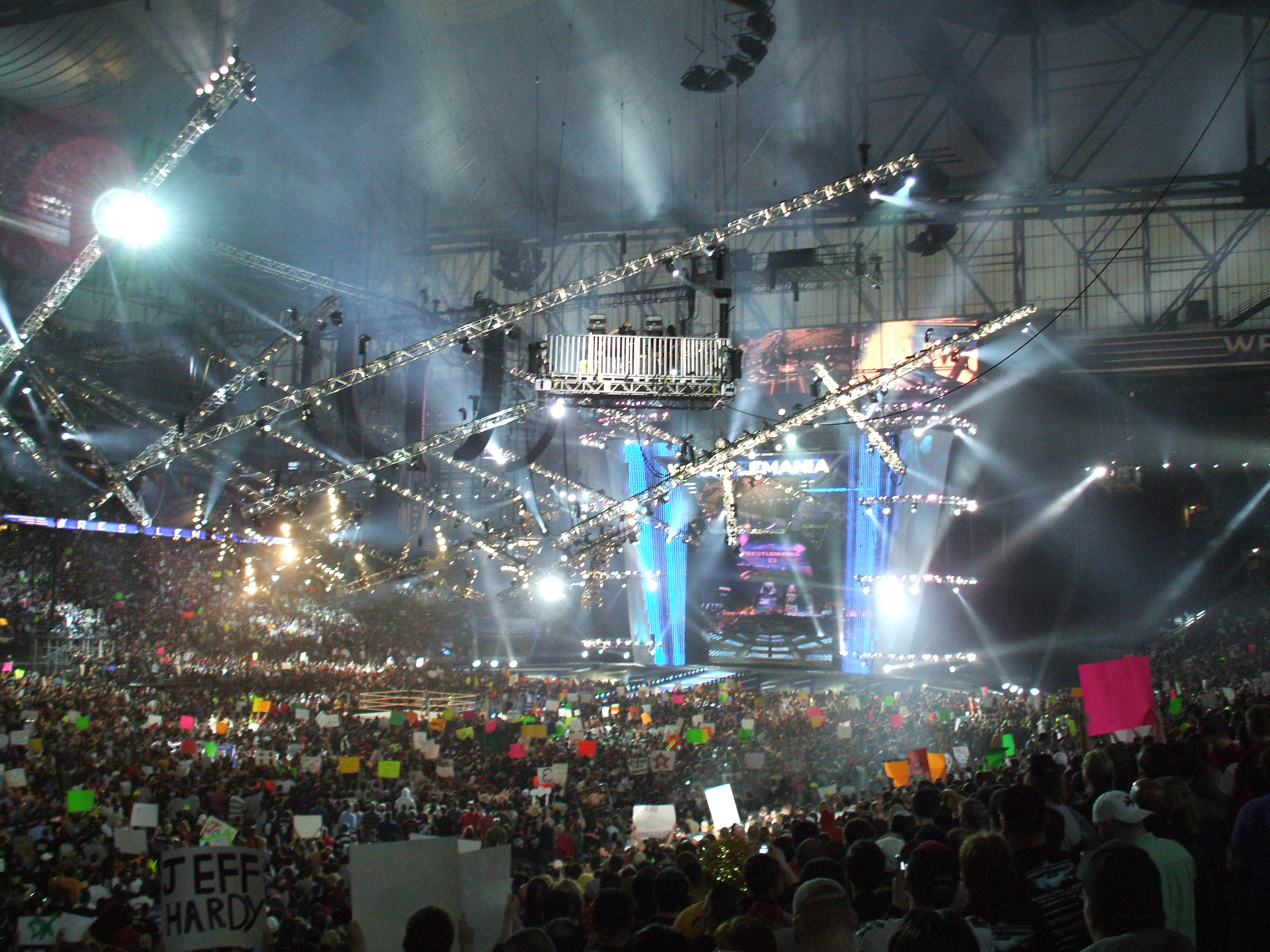
An attendance record setting 80,103 fans at Ford Field for WrestleMania 23.

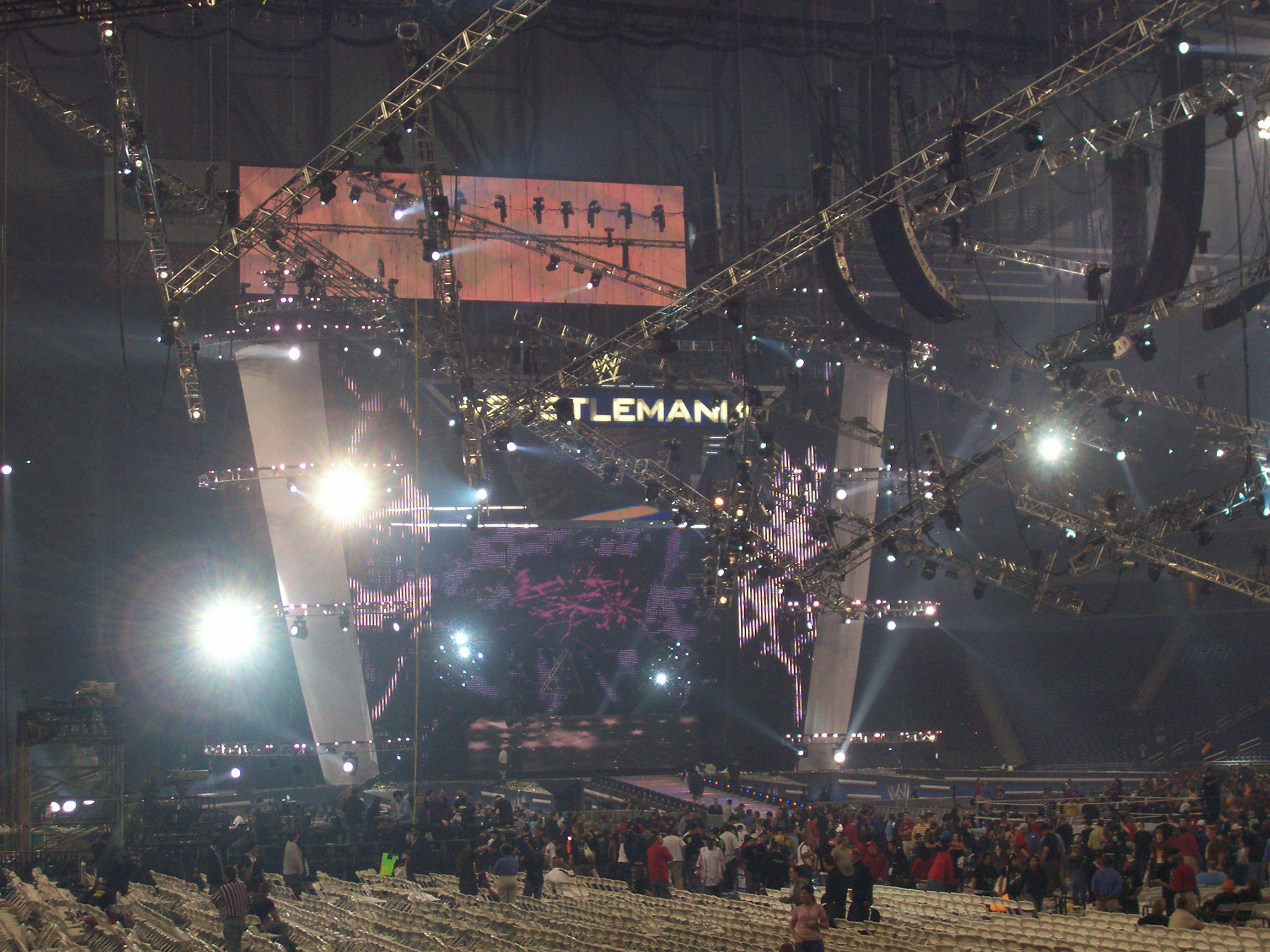
WrestleMania 23 stage at Ford Field.

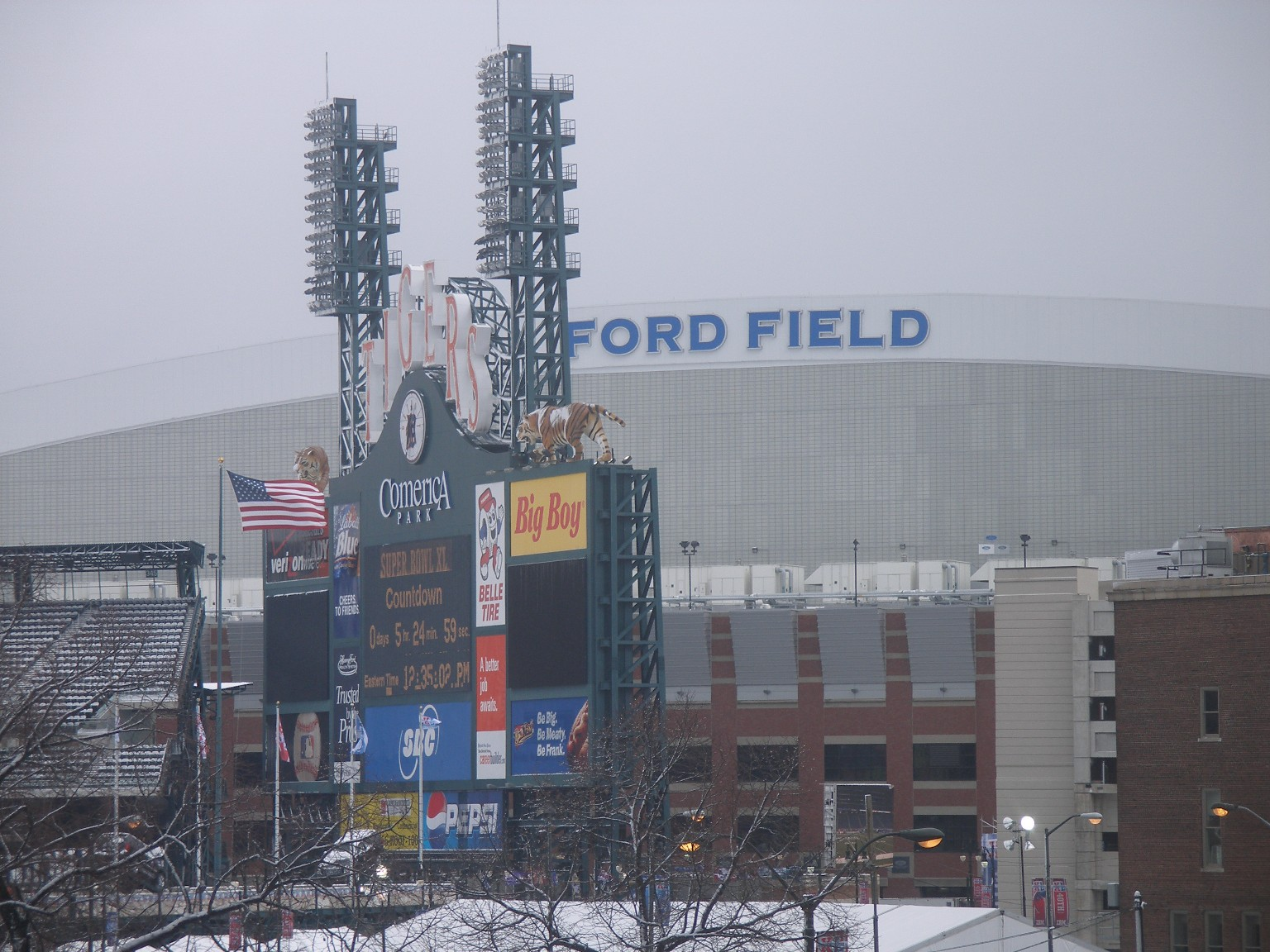
Ford Field on Super Bowl XL Sunday, countdown to kickoff on Comerica Park's scoreboard.

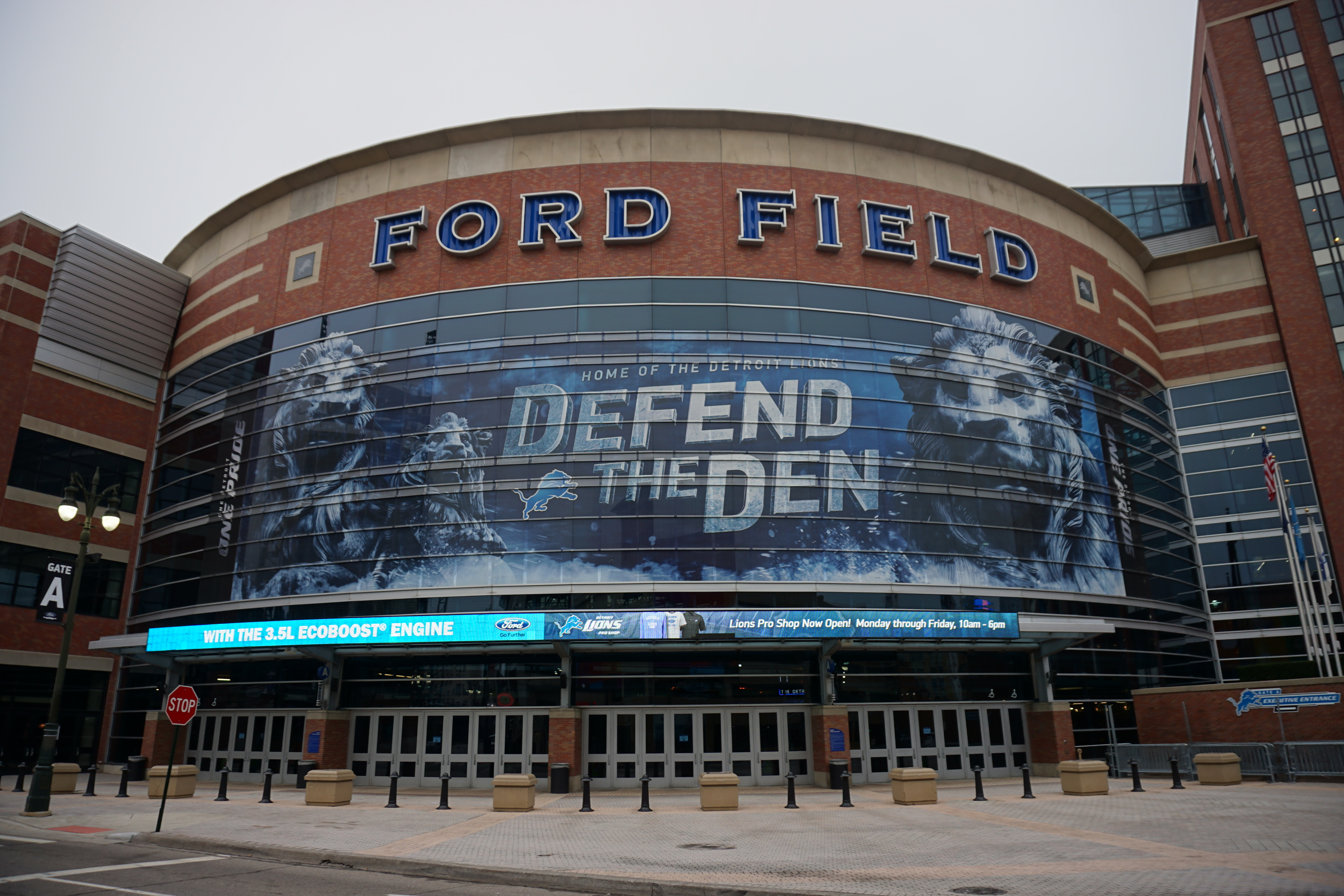
Exterior in 2015.

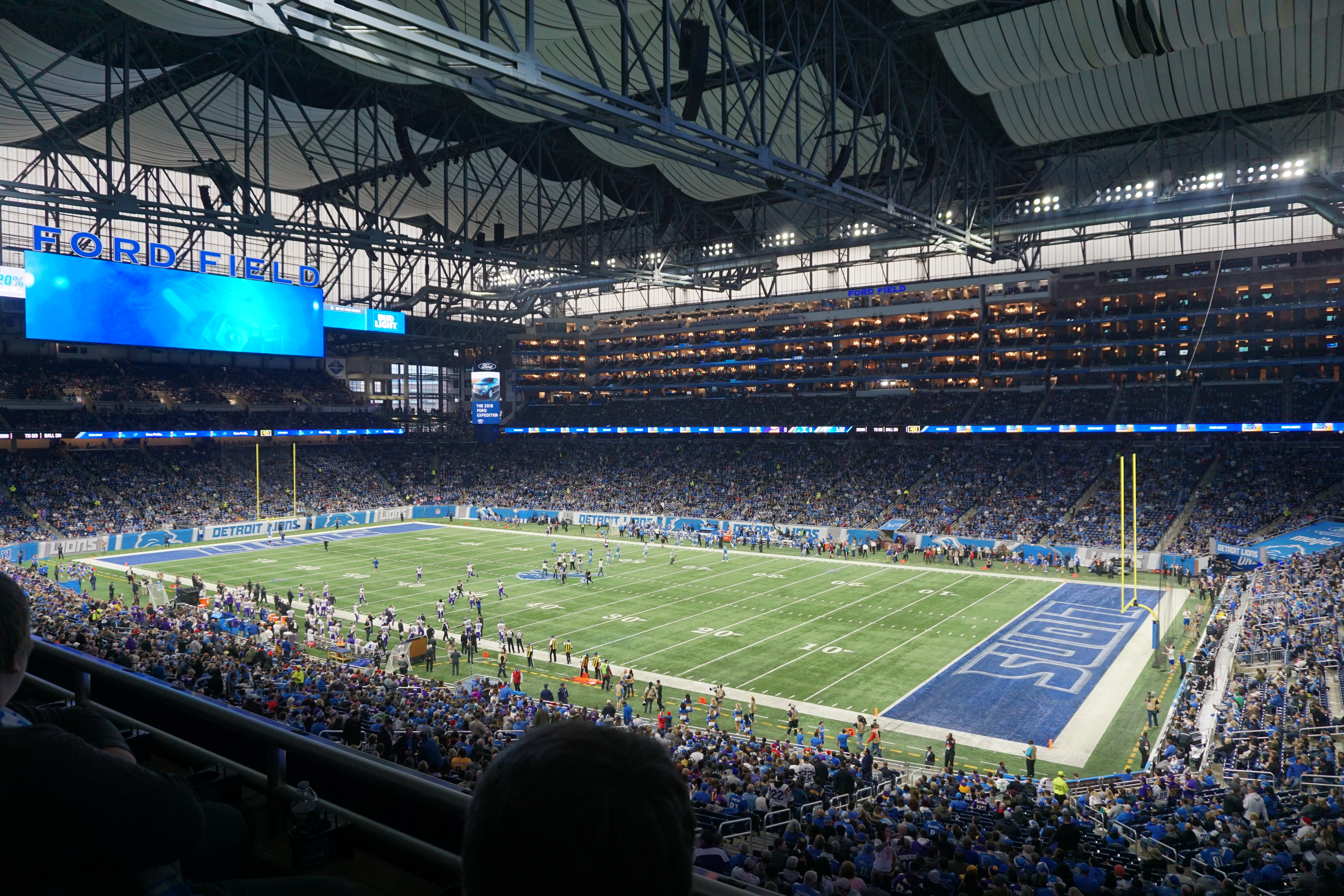
Before 2018 Minnesota Vikings vs. Detroit Lions game.

== Notes ==
Events and tenants
Preceded by Pontiac Silverdome	Home of Detroit Lions; 2002 – present	Succeeded by current
Preceded by Pontiac Silverdome	Host of Little Caesars Pizza Bowl; 2002 – 2013	Succeeded by Discontinued
Preceded by Alltel Stadium	Host of the Super Bowl; 2006 (XL)	Succeeded by Dolphin Stadium
Preceded by Allstate Arena	Host of WrestleMania; 2007 (23)	Succeeded by Citrus Bowl
Preceded by Hubert H. Humphrey Metrodome	Home of the Minnesota Vikings; Temporary; 2010	Succeeded by TCF Bank Stadium
Preceded by Ralph Wilson Stadium	Home of the Buffalo Bills; Temporary; 2014	Succeeded by Ralph Wilson Stadium
Preceded by Alamodome; Lucas Oil Stadium	NCAA Men's Division I Basketball Tournament; Finals venue 2009; 2027	Succeeded by Lucas Oil Stadium; Allegiant Stadium
Preceded by Verizon Center	Host of the Frozen Four; 2010	Succeeded by Xcel Energy Center
Preceded by Renaissance Center	Headquarters of Bodman PLC; 2006 – present	Succeeded by current
