= David Brandt (American football) =

American football player (born 1977)

No. 54, 65
- Position: Center

Personal information
- Born: September 25, 1977 (age 49); Grand Rapids, Michigan, U.S.
- Listed height: 6 ft 4 in (1.93 m)
- Listed weight: 309 lb (140 kg)

Career information
- High school: Jenison (Jenison, Michigan)
- College: Michigan
- NFL draft: 2001: undrafted

Career history
- Washington Redskins (2001); Green Bay Packers (2003)*; San Diego Chargers (2003–2004)
- * Offseason or practice squad member only

Awards and highlights
- National champion (1997)
- Stats at Pro Football Reference

David James Brandt (born September 25, 1977) is an American former professional football player who was an offensive lineman in the National Football League (NFL). He played college football for the Michigan Wolverines. Brandt was undrafted during the 2001 NFL draft, but was signed as a free agent by the Washington Redskins. He played in the NFL for the Redskins (2001–2002) and San Diego Chargers (2003–2004).

As of 2010, he has been an assistant coach at Grand Rapids Christian High School in Grand Rapids, Michigan. Brandt's sister, Julie Glass, is a leading roller derby skater.
