= Caleb Baragar =

American baseball player (born 1994)

Toros de Tijuana – No. 66
- Pitcher
- Born: April 9, 1994 (age 32); Jenison, Michigan, U.S.
- Bats: Right Throws: Left

Professional debut
- MLB: July 25, 2020, for the San Francisco Giants
- CPBL: September 12, 2025, for the Rakuten Monkeys

MLB statistics (through 2021 season)
- Win–loss record: 7–2
- Earned run average: 2.78
- Strikeouts: 35

CPBL statistics (through 2025 season)
- Win–loss record: 1–1
- Earned run average: 3.52
- Strikeouts: 10
- Stats at Baseball Reference

Teams
- San Francisco Giants (2020–2021); Rakuten Monkeys (2025)

Career highlights and awards
- Taiwan Series champion (2025)

Caleb Baragar (born April 9, 1994) is an American professional baseball pitcher for the Toros de Tijuana of the Mexican League. He pitched in college baseball for Jackson College and Indiana University. Baragar was drafted by the San Francisco Giants in the ninth round of the 2016 MLB draft, and made his Major League Baseball (MLB) debut for them in 2020. He also played in the Chinese Professional Baseball League (CPBL) for the Rakuten Monkeys.

== Amateur career ==
Bargar attended Jenison High School, where he threw two no-hitters. He pitched his first two collegiate seasons for Jackson College in 2013 and 2014. He transferred to Indiana University for his final two years, in 2015 and 2016.

During his 2014 offseason, Baragar played collegiate summer baseball for the Kalamazoo Growlers of the Northwoods League.

== Professional career ==
=== San Francisco Giants ===
Baragar was drafted by the San Francisco Giants in the ninth round (275th overall) of the 2016 MLB draft. He split his first professional season between the rookie-level Arizona League Giants and High-A San Jose Giants. Baragar spent the 2017 season with the Single-A Augusta GreenJackets, posting a 5–7 record and 4.63 ERA with 81 strikeouts in 114 2/3 innings pitched across 22 starts.

Baragar split the 2018 campaign between Augusta, San Jose, and the Triple-A Sacramento River Cats; in 26 appearances (12 starts) for the three affiliates, he compiled a 3–4 record and 4.06 ERA with 85 strikeouts over 82 innings of work. He split the 2019 season between San Jose, the Double-A Richmond Flying Squirrels, and Sacramento. In 28 appearances (26 starts) for the three affiliates, Baragar accumulated a 5–6 record and 3.57 ERA with 135 strikeouts over 141 innings of work; he was also named a Eastern League Mid-Season All-Star.

Baragar was invited to spring training for the Giants in 2020. He subsequently made the Giants' Opening Day roster and his contract was selected to the 40-man roster. Baragar made his MLB debut on July 25, 2020, earning the win after pitching two scoreless innings in relief against the Los Angeles Dodgers. In 24 appearances (one start) for the Giants during his rookie campaign, Baragar logged a 5–1 record with a 4.03 ERA with 19 strikeouts across 22 1/3 innings pitched. He was second in the NL in win–loss percentage (.833; behind Max Fried).

In the 2021 regular season with the Giants, he was 2–1 with two saves and a 1.57 ERA. He pitched in 25 games, pitching 23 innings in relief. With Triple–A Sacramento, Baragar was 3–3 with an 8.46 ERA, pitching 22 1/3 innings in 22 games (one start). He was designated for assignment on March 14, 2022, to create room on the roster for free agent signing Carlos Rodon.

=== Arizona Diamondbacks ===
On March 21, 2022, Baragar was claimed off of waivers by the Arizona Diamondbacks. He was designated for assignment on April 5, following the promotion of Óliver Pérez. On April 10, Baragar was outrighted to the Triple-A Reno Aces. In 43 games for Reno, he posted a 5.51 ERA with 50 strikeouts in 47 1/3 innings of work. He elected free agency following the season on November 10.

=== Cleveland Guardians ===
On December 22, 2022, Baragar signed a minor league contract with the Cleveland Guardians. The deal includes an invitation to the Guardians' 2023 major league spring training camp. In 23 games for the Triple–A Columbus Clippers, he struggled to a 6.54 ERA with 41 strikeouts and 2 saves across 31 2/3 innings pitched. On August 3, 2023, Baragar was released by the Guardians organization.

=== Lancaster Stormers ===
On April 15, 2024, Baragar signed with the Lancaster Stormers of the Atlantic League of Professional Baseball. He appeared in 3 games, all starts, and pitched to a 2.25 ERA with 18 strikeouts.

=== Minnesota Twins ===
On May 10, 2024, Baragar's contract was purchased by the Minnesota Twins organization. In 16 games (4 starts) for the Triple–A St. Paul Saints, he logged a 2–3 record and 5.96 ERA with 26 strikeouts across 25 2/3 innings pitched. Baragar was released by the Twins organization on September 12.

=== Toros de Tijuana ===
On February 11, 2025, Baragar signed with the Tecolotes de los Dos Laredos of the Mexican League. He was released by the Tecolotes prior to the start of the season on April 14.

On April 29, 2025, Baragar signed with the Toros de Tijuana of the Mexican League. In 11 starts for Tijuana, Baragar pitched to a 5–0 record and 3.59 ERA with 44 strikeouts across 42 2/3 innings pitched.

=== Rakuten Monkeys ===
On August 19, 2025, Baragar signed with the Rakuten Monkeys of the Chinese Professional Baseball League. In three starts for Rakuten, he posted a 1–1 record and 3.52 ERA with 10 strikeouts across 15 1/3 innings pitched. With the Monkeys, Baragar won the 2025 Taiwan Series. He became a free agent following the season.

=== Toros de Tijuana (second stint) ===
On April 14, 2026, Baragar signed with the Toros de Tijuana of the Mexican League.
