= Benny McCoy =

American baseball player (1915–2011)

- Benny McCoy – Double Play baseball card, 1941, #130
- Second baseman / Shortstop
- Born: November 9, 1915; Jenison, Michigan, U.S.
- Died: November 9, 2011 (aged 96); Grandville, Michigan, U.S.
- Batted: Left Threw: Right

MLB debut
- September 14, 1938, for the Detroit Tigers

Last MLB appearance
- September 28, 1941, for the Philadelphia Athletics

MLB statistics
- Batting average: .269
- Home runs: 16
- Runs batted in: 156
- Stats at Baseball Reference

Teams
- Detroit Tigers (1938–1939); Philadelphia Athletics (1940–1941)

Benjamin Jenison McCoy (November 9, 1915 – November 9, 2011) was a second baseman in Major League Baseball who played for the Detroit Tigers (1938–1939) and Philadelphia Athletics (1940–1941). Listed at 5 ft 9 in (1.75 m). 170 lb., he batted left-handed and threw right-handed. He was born in Jenison, Michigan.

== Biography ==
=== Baseball career ===
McCoy was 22 years old when he entered the majors in September 1938 with the Detroit Tigers, appearing in seven games while hitting a .200 batting average (3-for-15). In 1939, though he played just two months for Detroit after Charlie Gehringer was injured, McCoy hit .302 with 33 runs batted in and 38 runs scored in 55 games played. At the end of the season, he was dealt by the Tigers to the Philadelphia Athletics in exchange for Wally Moses.

McCoy was among 91 Detroit minor league players declared free agents by baseball commissioner Kenesaw Mountain Landis. The Tigers had been blocking players in their minor league system for years, players with major league skills, which was a fairly common practice in those days as there were only 16 big league clubs and precious few jobs. For a middle infielder, McCoy was a very good offensive player, but Detroit had Gehringer and he was blocked in the minors.

McCoy played in 1940 and 1941 with the Athletics. His most productive season came in 1941, when he hit .271 with 61 RBI and posted career-highs in games (141), hits (140), walks (95), runs (86), home runs (8), and triples (7). He spent the next four years in the US Navy during World War II. When he returned from service, his skills had eroded and he never played another game.

In a four-season career, McCoy was a .269 hitter (327-for-1214) with 16 home runs and 156 RBI in 337 games, including 182 runs, 327 hits, 52 doubles, 18 triples, and eight stolen bases. A selective and patient hitter, he posted a solid .384 on-base percentage and a respectable 1.56 strikeout-to-walk ratio (190-to-122).

McCoy played in the National Baseball Congress with the St Joseph's Autos team in 1946.

Before his death, he was recognized as one of the oldest living major league ballplayers.

=== Death ===
McCoy died on his 96th birthday on November 9, 2011.
