= Plymouth–Canton Marching Band =

Marching band

- School: Plymouth-Canton Educational Park
- Location: Canton, MI
- Founded: 1972
- Director: Michael Wells
- Website: pcmb.net

The Plymouth–Canton Marching Band (PCMB) is a nationally recognized marching band program located on the campus of the Plymouth-Canton Educational Park in Canton, Michigan, United States.

== Music program ==
The PCMB is part of a broader fine arts program offered in the Plymouth-Canton Community Schools. Its Wind Ensemble, Chamber Winds, and Symphony bands have consistently rated among the best in the state of Michigan. PCEP band students and alumni have performed with the Detroit Symphony Orchestra, the Detroit Civic Youth Orchestra, the Michigan Youth Band, the National Honor Band of America, and the MSBOA All State Honor Band and Orchestra.

== Staff ==
James Griffith served as Plymouth's Director of Bands until his retirement in 1994. Griffith won MSBOA District XII teacher of the year in 1986.

== Awards and honors ==
Since the mid-1970s, the Plymouth Canton Marching Band has become one of the most consistent high school marching bands in Southeast Michigan. Within the state of Michigan, the PCMB has been a state champion 25 times, an honor shared with no other groups in Michigan, (both Fine Arts and Athletics), and only with one other group in the country: the Marian Catholic High School Marching Band. Upon entering the Bands of America in 1986, Plymouth-Canton has been a National Finalist (Top 12) all but three years since 1988. This has honor has been exceeded only by the Marian Catholic High School Band. The Plymouth-Canton Marching Band has won more than 500 awards in 16 years. The band has also been to the Tostitos Fiesta Bowl Tournament of Bands in 1992 & 1996, winning the prestigious competition both years.

Outside of the competition, the band has had the distinction of playing for Presidents Ronald Reagan, in 1986, and George H. W. Bush, in 1992, marching in Orlando, FL, the 1974 King Orange (Bowl) Parade, the 1973 Tournament of Roses Parade, the 1973 Battle of the Bands shown nationally immediately prior to the Rose Parade, the 1973 JL Hudson Thanksgiving Day Parade-Santa's band as well as representing the community in various parades throughout the summer. In 2011, the band marched in the Macy's Thanksgiving Day Parade in New York City, and returned to the Tournament of Roses Parade in 2016.

=== Competitive results and repertoire ===
- 2008: Kaleidoscope - 11th Place Bands of America Grand National Finalist
- 2007: Out of the Shadows - 7th Place Bands of America Grand National Finalist, Bands of America Ypsilanti Regional Champion, MCBA State Champion
- 2006: The Passion Within - 9th Place Bands of America Grand National Finalist, Bands of America Ypsilanti Regional Champion, MCBA State Champion
- 2005: Performing Inside Out - 9th Place Bands of America Grand National Finalist, MCBA State Champion, Bands of America Pontiac Regional Runner-Up
- 1999: Thoughtcrime, Music for an Orwellian Era - Bands of America Grand National Champion, Captions for Best Music and Best General Effect, MCBA State Champion, Bands of America Toledo Regional Runner-up

== Winter programs ==
The PCMB also runs three very successful winter programs through the Michigan Color Guard Circuit and Winter Guard International. Both Winter Guards (A & World) have been State Champions and the Open guard is a two time WGI Open Class Finalist.
