= Godwin Heights Public Schools =

School district in Michigan, U.S.

Address
- 15 36th Street SW Wyoming, Kent County, Michigan, 49548; United States

District information
- Grades: Pre-Kindergarten-12
- Superintendent: Chad Conklin
- Schools: 5
- Budget: $40,221,000 2022-2023 expenditures
- NCES District ID: 2616110

Students and staff
- Students: 1,954 (2024-2025)
- Teachers: 111.1 (on an FTE basis) (2024-2025)
- Staff: 283.28 FTE (2024-2025)
- Student–teacher ratio: 17.59 (2024-2025)

Other information
- Website: www.godwinschools.org

Godwin Heights Public Schools is a public school district in the Grand Rapids, Michigan area. It serves parts of Wyoming and Grand Rapids.

== History ==
The Godwin area was named for Augustus Godwin, an early pioneer and county supervisor. The first school in the Godwin area was a one-room schoolhouse built in 1837. A new school was built in 1867, marking the official founding of the school district.

In 1924, a school was built at the northwest corner of 36th Street and Division Avenue South, on the site of the current high school. It housed all grades in the district, which had about 100 students at the time. The first class graduated from the building in 1927. It was torn down in 1974, after the current high school was built.

A new high school, currently used as the district's middle school, opened in fall 1929. A time capsule was placed in the building's cornerstone. The west wing was added in 1939, and the east wing added in 1941. Labor for the east wing's construction was provided by the Works Progress Administration. The former K-12 school became a junior high when the 1929 high school opened.

The Physical Education Building, designed by the architecture firm Louis C. Kingscott and Associates, opened in 1959. When the current high school was built, the Physical Education Building was retained and connected to the new high school by a corridor.

The current Godwin High School opened in February 1973. With a 1,000-seat auditorium and a 65-seat planetarium, the Grand Rapids Press called the building "the ultimate in equipment and comforts conducive to learning." The former high school was converted to a middle school.

== Schools ==
Godwin Heights High School

Location
- 50 35th Street SW; Wyoming, Michigan 49548; United States
- 42°54′01″N 85°40′01″W

Information
- School district: Godwin Heights Public Schools
- Principal: Michael Porco
- Teaching staff: 35.03 (FTE) (2023–2024)
- Enrollment: 653 (2023–2024)
- Student to teacher ratio: 18.63 (2023–2024)
- Color: Navy Gold
- Athletics conference: MHSAA; Ottawa-Kent Conference; Silver Division
- Mascot: Wolverines
- Website: hs.godwinschools.org

Schools in Godwin Heights Public Schools district
| School | Address | Notes |
|---|---|---|
| Godwin Heights High School | 50 35th Street SW, Wyoming | Grades 9–12. Built 1973. Physical Education Building built 1959. |
| Godwin Heights Learning Center | 3529 S Division, Wyoming | Alternative high school housed within Godwin Heights High School. |
| Godwin Heights Middle School | 100 Wexford Street SE, Wyoming | Grades 6–8. Built 1929. |
| North Godwin Elementary | 161 34th Street SW, Wyoming | Grades 3–5 |
| West Godwin Elementary | 3546 Clyde Park Ave SW, Wyoming | Grades K–2 |
| Godwin Heights Early Childhood Center | 28 Bellevue St SE, Grand Rapids | Preschool |
