= Robert Jenison =

English Puritan cleric & academic (1584-1652)

Robert Jenison (1584?–1652) was an English Puritan cleric and academic.

== Life ==
The son of Ralph Jenison, who died mayor of Newcastle upon Tyne on 16 May 1597, and cousin of Robert Jenison the Jesuit, he was born at Newcastle about 1583, and was educated at Emmanuel College, Cambridge, where his tutor was Samuel Ward, with whom he later kept up a correspondence, graduating B.A. in 1605. He moved to St John's College, where he was admitted fellow in 1607. He subsequently became D.D., and seems to have acted for some time as domestic chaplain in the family of Henry Grey, 6th Earl of Kent.

Jenison resigned his fellowship in March 1619, having previously been appointed the first master of St. Mary Magdalene's Hospital, Newcastle, which was reincorporated by James I in 1611. He was made a lecturer at All Saints' Church, Newcastle upon Tyne, in 1622. Thomas Jackson was brought into St. Nicholas, Newcastle in 1623, to thwart moves to have Jenison appointed. Subscriptions were made for him, and in 1631 Trinity House sent him a present of four gallons of sack.

Suspended for nonconformity in 1639, Jenison went to Danzig, avoiding religious controversies. With the sequestration of Yeldred Alvey, the royalist vicar of St. Nicholas, Newcastle, by the House of Commons in 1645, he was recalled to fill Alvey's place as a preacher. Shortly after his appointment he administered the Solemn League and Covenant to the major Guild of Masters and Mariners in Newcastle. In 1651 Jenison joined with six other ministers of Newcastle in complaining to Oliver Cromwell that Robert Everard was preaching Arminian and Socinian doctrines, encouraged in so doing by Lieutenant-colonel Mason who was commanding the garrison in Colonel Fairfax's absence.

Jenison died on 6 November 1652, and was buried in St. Nicholas Church. His successor was Samuel Hammond.

== Works ==
Jenison wrote:

- The Christian's Apparelling by Christ (with a preface by Richard Sibbes), 1625.
- The Citie's Safetie; or, a fruitfull treatise … on Psalm cxxvij. 1, 1630.
- Newcastle's Call to her Neighbours and sister Townes and Cities throughout the Land, to take Warning by her Sins and Sorrows lest this overflowing Scourge of Pestilence reach even to them also, London, 1637.
- Of Compunction or Pricking of Heart, the time, means, nature, necessity, and order of it, and of Conversion, (no date), with A Catalogue of the most Vendible Books in England, London, 1657.

== Family ==
Jenison married Barbara, daughter of Samuel Sanderson of Hedleyhope, County Durham, She survived him and remarried John Emerson, mayor of Newcastle in 1660, dying 9 August 1673.

== Notes ==
Attribution

This article incorporates text from a publication now in the public domain: Lee, Sidney, ed. (1892). "Jenison, Robert (1584?-1652)". Dictionary of National Biography. Vol. 29. London: Smith, Elder & Co.
