= Jenison, Michigan =

- Census-designated place (CDP) & unincorporated community
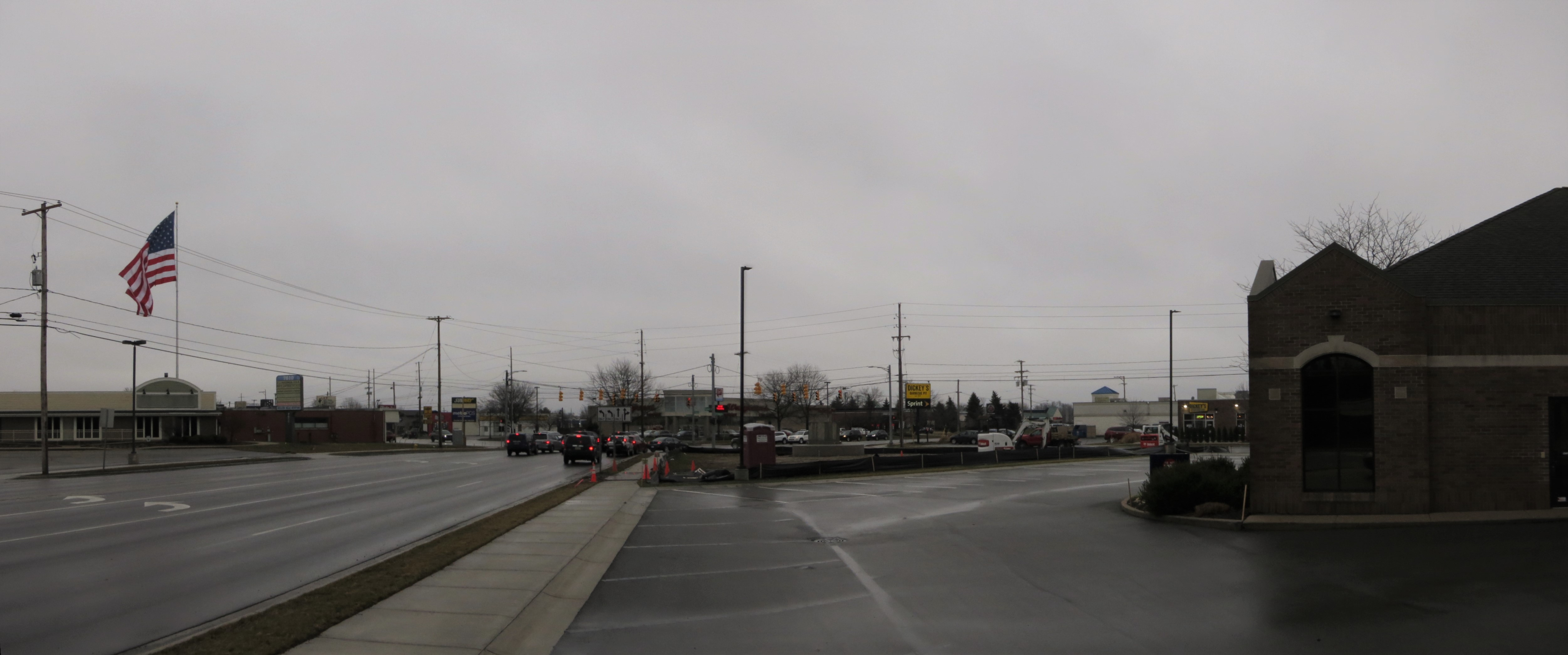
- Intersection of Cottonwood and Baldwin

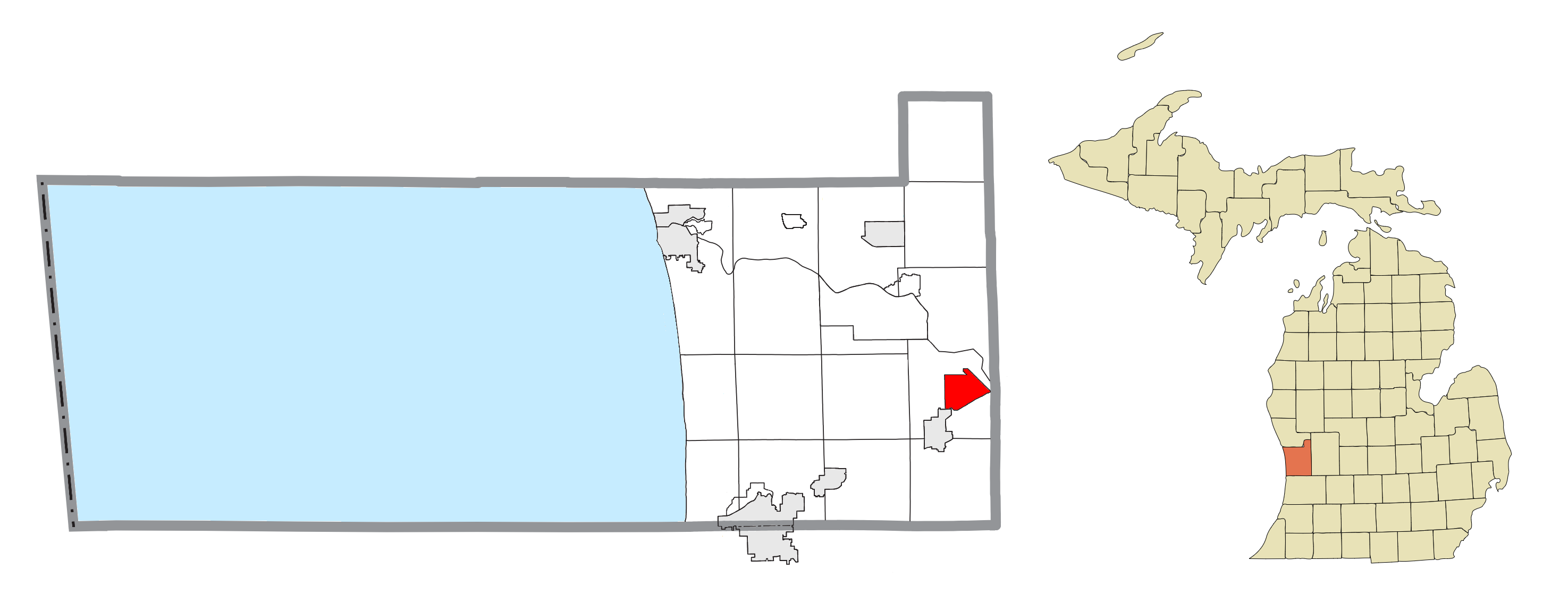
- Location within Ottawa County

- Location within the state of Michigan Location within the United States
- Coordinates: 42°54′20″N 85°47′31″W
- Country: United States
- State: Michigan
- County: Ottawa
- Township: Georgetown
- Settled: 1836

Area
  - Total: 5.93 sq mi (15.36 km^{2})
  - Land: 5.85 sq mi (15.16 km^{2})
  - Water: 0.077 sq mi (0.20 km^{2})
- Elevation: 604 ft (184 m)

Population (2020)
  - Total: 16,640
  - Density: 2,839.59/sq mi (1,096.37/km^{2})
- Time zone: UTC-5 (EST)
  - Summer (DST): UTC-4 (EDT)
- ZIP code(s): 49428, 49429
- Area code: 616
- FIPS code: 26-41680
- GNIS feature ID: 0629253

Jenison is a census-designated place (CDP) in Ottawa County in the U.S. state of Michigan. The community is located within Georgetown Charter Township. As of the 2020 census, Jenison had a population of 16,640. The current estimated population for the entire Jenison ZIP code, 49428, is 26,156. The geographical boundaries of the ZIP code are larger than that of the CDP.

It is a bedroom community in proximity to Grand Rapids.

== History ==
The area that Jenison occupies was first inhabited by Peoria and Odawa indigenous peoples, and later populated by white settlers in 1836 as a lumber site along the Grand River. Jenison gained its name from the Jenison family's sawmill, which opened in 1864. A post office called Jenisonville was established in 1872, and the name was changed to Jenison in 1887.

== Geography ==
According to the United States Census Bureau, the community has a total area of 5.9 square miles (15 km^{2}), of which 5.8 square miles (15 km^{2}) is land and 0.1 square miles (0.26 km^{2}) (0.85%) is water.

== Demographics ==
Historical population
Census	Pop.	Note	%±
2000	17,211		—
2010	16,538		−3.9%
2020	16,640		0.6%
U.S. Decennial Census

The Husband-Hanchett house at Port Sheldon and Main, a State of Michigan historical site and home of the Jenison Museum.

=== 2020 census ===
As of the 2020 census, Jenison had a population of 16,640. The median age was 39.2 years. 25.3% of residents were under the age of 18 and 21.3% of residents were 65 years of age or older. For every 100 females there were 94.6 males, and for every 100 females age 18 and over there were 90.5 males age 18 and over.

100.0% of residents lived in urban areas, while 0.0% lived in rural areas.

There were 6,222 households in Jenison, of which 31.8% had children under the age of 18 living in them. Of all households, 63.3% were married-couple households, 11.2% were households with a male householder and no spouse or partner present, and 22.6% were households with a female householder and no spouse or partner present. About 23.2% of all households were made up of individuals and 16.2% had someone living alone who was 65 years of age or older.

There were 6,482 housing units, of which 4.0% were vacant. The homeowner vacancy rate was 0.5% and the rental vacancy rate was 16.7%.

Racial composition as of the 2020 census
Race	Number	Percent
White	15,127	90.9%
Black or African American	158	0.9%
American Indian and Alaska Native	43	0.3%
Asian	142	0.9%
Native Hawaiian and Other Pacific Islander	4	0.0%
Some other race	232	1.4%
Two or more races	934	5.6%
Hispanic or Latino (of any race)	719	4.3%

=== 2000 census ===
As of the census of 2000, there were 17,211 people, 5,975 households, and 4,863 families residing in the community. The population density was 2,940.8 inhabitants per square mile (1,135.4/km^{2}). There were 6,065 housing units at an average density of 1,036.3 per square mile (400.1/km^{2}). The racial makeup of the community was 98.84% White, 0.49% African American, 0.21% Native American, 0.85% Asian, 0.01% Pacific Islander, 0.53% from other races, and 0.87% from two or more races. Hispanic or Latino of any race were 1.77% of the population.

There were 5,975 households, out of which 39.8% had children under the age of 18 living with them, 73.5% were married couples living together, 5.8% had a female householder with no husband present, and 18.6% were non-families. 16.9% of all households were made up of individuals, and 10.1% had someone living alone who was 65 years of age or older. The average household size was 2.86 and the average family size was 3.24.

In the community, the population was spread out, with 28.9% under the age of 18, 7.8% from 18 to 24, 26.8% from 25 to 44, 24.0% from 45 to 64, and 12.5% who were 65 years of age or older. The median age was 36 years. For every 100 females, there were 93.5 males. For every 100 females age 18 and over, there were 90.5 males.

The median income for a household in the community was $56,426, and the median income for a family was $61,957. Males had a median income of $46,738 versus $28,204 for females. The per capita income for the community was $21,021. About 1.8% of families and 2.5% of the population were below the poverty line, including 3.1% of those under age 18 and 4.3% of those age 65 or over.

== Major highways ==
- M-121 (Chicago Drive)
- I-196

== Major roads ==
- Baldwin Street
- Bauer Road
- Cottonwood Drive
- Chicago Drive
- Rosewood Street

== Schools ==
The majority of the community is located within the Jenison Public School District. A small portion is located within the Hudsonville Public School District. Jenison Christian School, a private school for grades Preschool through 8th grade, is also located in Jenison.

== Notable people ==
- Caleb Baragar, professional baseball player for the San Francisco Giants of Major League Baseball
- David Brandt, retired player in the National Football League
- Mark Dewey, retired Major League Baseball pitcher
- Kevin DeYoung, pastor, author
- Paul Grasmanis, retired player in the National Football League
- Richard Grenell, diplomat and ambassador
- Benny McCoy, retired Major League Baseball infielder
- Andy Ponstein, ARCA driver
- Glenn Duffie Shriver, convicted of attempted espionage.

== See also ==
- Jenison Public Schools
- Jenison High School
- Georgetown Township, Michigan
- Ottawa County, Michigan
