= Robert Jenison House =

Historic house in Massachusetts, United States

- U.S. National Register of Historic Places
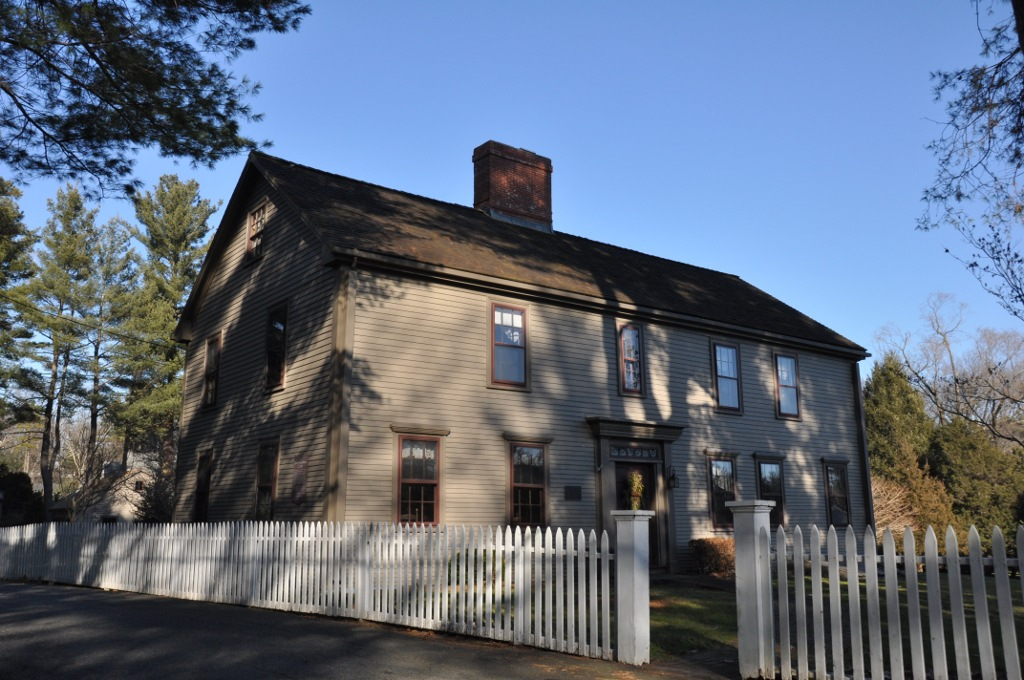

- Location within Massachusetts Location within the United States
- Nearest city: Natick, Massachusetts
- Coordinates: 42°19′21″N 71°20′9″W
- Built: 1738
- Architect: Robert Jenison
- NRHP reference No.: 78000456
- Added to NRHP: September 6, 1978

The Robert Jenison House is a historic house at 1 Frost Road in Natick, Massachusetts. It is a 2 1/2-story wood-frame house, five bays wide, with a side-gable roof, large central chimney, and clapboard siding. The house was built c. 1738 by Robert Jenison. It is one of the town's oldest buildings, and its builder is known to have built a number of other houses in Sudbury and Sherborn. The house was originally part of a 200-acre tract of land that was sold by the Natick Indians despite protests from John Eliot. There is an outbuilding on the property that is marked as the site where Vice President Henry Wilson learned to make shoes.

The house was added to the National Register of Historic Places in 1978, where it is listed at 470 Winter Street.

== See also ==
- National Register of Historic Places listings in Middlesex County, Massachusetts
