= Jenison Public Schools =

School district in Michigan, United States

Address
- 8375 20th Ave. Jenison, Ottawa, Michigan, 49428; United States

District information
- Type: Public
- Grades: PreK–12
- Superintendent: Dr. Brandon W. Graham
- Budget: $111,631,000 expenditures 2022-2023
- NCES District ID: 2619830

Students and staff
- Students: 5,165 (2024-2025)
- Teachers: 368.63 FTE (2024-2025)
- Staff: 810.11 FTE (2024-2025)
- Student–teacher ratio: 14.91 (2024-2025)

Other information
- Website: www.jpsonline.org

Jenison Public Schools is a public school district in Ottawa County, Michigan. It serves the census-designated place of Jenison, Michigan and parts of Georgetown Township.

== Jenison Center for the Arts ==
On the site of the high school, Jenison Center for the Arts is a stand-alone 1,251-seat performing arts center that opened in 2013. The building was designed by URS Corporation and Jones & Phillips theater consultants. Besides being used for student productions and concerts, the center was designed to attract professional productions.

== Schools ==
Schools in Jenison Public Schools district
School	Address	Notes
Jenison High School	2140 Bauer Rd., Jenison	Grades 9-12
Jenison Junior High School	8295 20th Ave., Jenison	Grades 7-8
Bauerwood Elementary	1443 Bauer Rd., Jenison	Grades K-6
Bursley Elementary	1195 Port Sheldon St., Jenison	Grades K-6
Pinewood Elementary	2405 Chippewa St., Jenison	Grades K-6
Rosewood Elementary	2370 Tyler St., Jenison	Grades K-6
Sandy Hill Elementary	1990 Baldwin St., Jenison	Grades K-6
El Puente Elementary	2950 Baldwin St., Hudsonville	Grades K-6, Spanish-language immersion program at Kids First Building. Opened fall 2018.
Early Childhood Center	2950 Baldwin St., Hudsonville	Preschool within Kids First Building, opened 2018.
Jenison Innovation Academy	800 Connie St., Jenison	K-12 alternative school for online & hybrid learning.
Wilderness Academy	2950 Baldwin St., Hudsonville	Outdoor education school headquartered at Kids First Building.
