= Jenison High School =

High school in Ottawa County, Michigan

Jenison Senior High School

Location
- 2140 Bauer Road; Jenison, Michigan 49428; United States; 42°55′14″N 85°50′09″W

Information
- Type: Public secondary school
- Established: 1970
- School district: Jenison Public Schools
- Principal: Michael Leiter
- Faculty: 81
- Teaching staff: 77.90 (FTE)
- Grades: 9–12
- Enrollment: 1,515 (2024-25)
- Student to teacher ratio: 18.87
- Colors: Forest Green, Silver Lining
- Athletics: Tennis, football, baseball, water polo, swimming, track, cross country, hockey, volleyball, softball, wrestling, dance, and marching band
- Mascot: Wildcats
- Website: www.jpsonline.org/o/hs
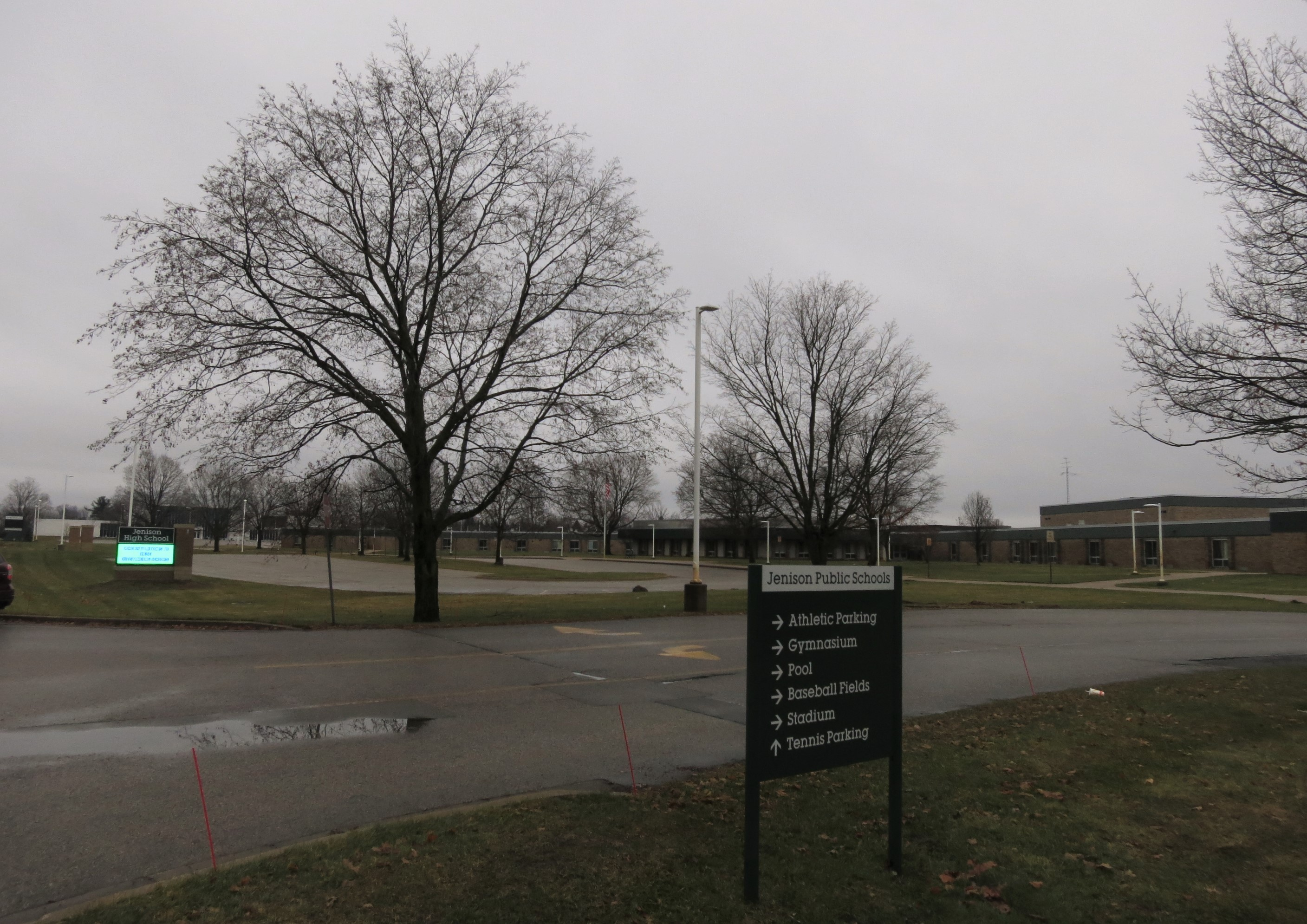
- A photo of Jenison High School's campus

Student assessments
- 2021–22 school year Change vs. prior year

M-STEP 11th grade proficiency rates (Science / Social Studies)
- Advanced %: 21.8 / 15.6
- Proficient %: 25.3 / 25.6
- PR. Proficient %: 17.4 / 45.6
- Not Proficient %: 35.6 / 13.2

Average test scores
- SAT Total: 1051.1 (▼ −8.6)

Jenison High School is the senior high school for Jenison Public Schools located in Jenison, Michigan serving grades 9 through 12. The school's athletics department competes in the Ottawa-Kent Conference.

== Academics ==
Jenison High School offers 18 different Advanced Placement (AP) courses.

The average SAT composite score for 2023-2024 was 1054.7.

== Athletics ==
=== Softball ===
State Champions, Class A, 1987, 1988, 1990, 1992, 1994, 1995

The softball field is named after Jerry Hoag, head coach of all Jenison's State Championship softball teams.

=== Football ===
The Wildcats play in David McKenzie Stadium, which is named after one of the districts former superintendents.

=== Ice hockey ===
The Jenison/Zeeland Varsity hockey team plays their games in Georgetown ice arena.

=== Baseball ===
Jenison's teams play at Gary Cook Field.

== Fine arts ==
Jenison is known for its fine arts programs. Jenison High School offers marching band, concert band, orchestra, choir, and theater programs.

=== Marching band ===
Jenison High School's marching band competes in the Michigan Competing Band Association (MCBA) state-level circuit, where the band has won first place in MCBA Flight II in 2001, 2002, 2004, 2011, 2012, 2013, 2017, 2018, 2019, 2021, 2022, 2023, 2024, and 2025.

The band also competes in the Bands of America circuit nationally, where they have been regional champions at the Northwest Ohio Regional in 2022 and 2023, and have been semifinalists in the Grand National Championships in 2021, 2022, and 2024.

The marching band participated in the Macy's Thanksgiving Day Parade in 2023.

== Facilities ==
Jenison High School is located on the JPS Main Campus, which contains the High School, Jenison Junior High School, the Jenison Center for the Arts, and the Jenison athletic facilities.

=== Fieldhouse ===
In 2022, Jenison Public Schools opened their new high school fieldhouse. The indoor athletic facility is 64,000 square feet, has a 70-foot turf field, two track lanes, a classroom and a cheer room. The fieldhouse is located to the southwest of the main high school building, across the main parking lot.

=== Jenison Center for the Arts (JCA) ===
The Jenison Center for the Arts is a performing arts center located on campus.

== Notable alumni ==
- Caleb Baragar, MLB baseball pitcher
- David Brandt, NFL football player
- Mark Dewey, MLB baseball pitcher
- Paul Grasmanis, NFL football player
- Richard Grenell, diplomat and special presidential envoy for special missions for the second Trump administration
- Glenn Duffie Shriver, American convicted of espionage for China
