= College Baseball All-America Team =

Honorary sports team

College Baseball All-America teams are selected each year by various organizations and consist of players who compete in National Collegiate Athletic Association (NCAA), National Association of Intercollegiate Athletics (NAIA), and National Junior College Athletic Association (NJCAA) intercollegiate baseball. In general, an All-American team is an honorary sports team composed of the best amateur players of a specific season for each team position—who in turn are given the honorific "All-America" and typically referred to as "All-American athletes", or simply "All-Americans". Although the honorees generally do not compete together as a unit, the term is used in U.S. team sports to refer to players who are selected by members of the national media or other organizations.

Currently, several organizations select their own individual, college baseball, All-America teams. Many of them will select a first, second, and third team, sometimes including honorable mentions, but only the "First Team" is considered to be a true All-American.

There is no "official" list of which are the most relevant All-American selectors, but the following are the most often cited by schools and conferences:

Label	Selector	Years
A	1947 – present	American Baseball Coaches Association
S	1964 – 1990; 1992 – 1993; 1997 – 1998; 2000 – 2001	The Sporting News
B	1981 – present	Baseball America
C	1991 – 2023	Collegiate Baseball Newspaper
N	2000 – present	National Collegiate Baseball Writers Association
U	2000 – 2005	USA Today Sports under the brand of Baseball Weekly and then Sports Weekly
R	2006 – 2010	Rivals.com
P	2011 – present	Perfect Game
D	2015 – present	D1Baseball.com
F	2019 – present	College Baseball Foundation

== By year ==
- 1947
- 1948
- 1949
- 1950
- 1951
- 1952
- 1953
- 1954
- 1955
- 1956
- 1957
- 1958
- 1959
- 1960
- 1961
- 1962
- 1963
- 1964
- 1965
- 1966
- 1967
- 1968
- 1969
- 1970
- 1971
- 1972
- 1973
- 1974
- 1975
- 1976
- 1977
- 1978
- 1979
- 1980
- 1981
- 1982
- 1983
- 1984
- 1985
- 1986
- 1987
- 1988
- 1989
- 1990
- 1991
- 1992
- 1993
- 1994
- 1995
- 1996
- 1997
- 1998
- 1999
- 2000
- 2001
- 2002
- 2003
- 2004
- 2005
- 2006
- 2007
- 2008
- 2009
- 2010
- 2011
- 2012
- 2013
- 2014
- 2015
- 2016
- 2017
- 2018
- 2019
- 2020
- 2021
- 2022
- 2023
- 2024
- 2025
- 2026

== Consensus All-Americans ==
There is no official list of what constitutes a "consensus" All-American, but most sources will identify a player who has been selected by the majority of lists as a "consensus" All-American. Many sources will list a player as a "unanimous" All-American if he is named by all selectors.

Years	Selectors	Consensus requires
1947 – 1980	1	1
1981 – 1990	2	1
1990 – 1999	3	2
2000 – 2014	5	3
2015 – 2018	6	4
2019	7	4
2020	1	1
2021 – 2023	7	4
2024 – 2025	6	4

== Players with most selections ==
Five players have been named a consensus All-American three times:

Pos	Player	Team	Seasons
2B	Charlie Teague	Wake Forest	1947 1949 1950
SS	Eddie Leon	Arizona	1965 1966 1967
P	Burt Hooton	Texas	1969 1970 1971
C	Jason Varitek	Georgia Tech	1992 1993 1994
UT	Brendan McKay	Louisville	2015 2016 2017

Overall, Arizona State leads all programs with 43 consensus All-America selections, followed closely by Florida State, Texas, and USC with 41 each.

== See also ==
- College baseball awards

== Notes ==
All selectors, except for the Collegiate Baseball Newspaper, did not name a team in 2020, when the season was canceled in March after the COVID-19 pandemic
