= 2000 College Baseball All-America Team =

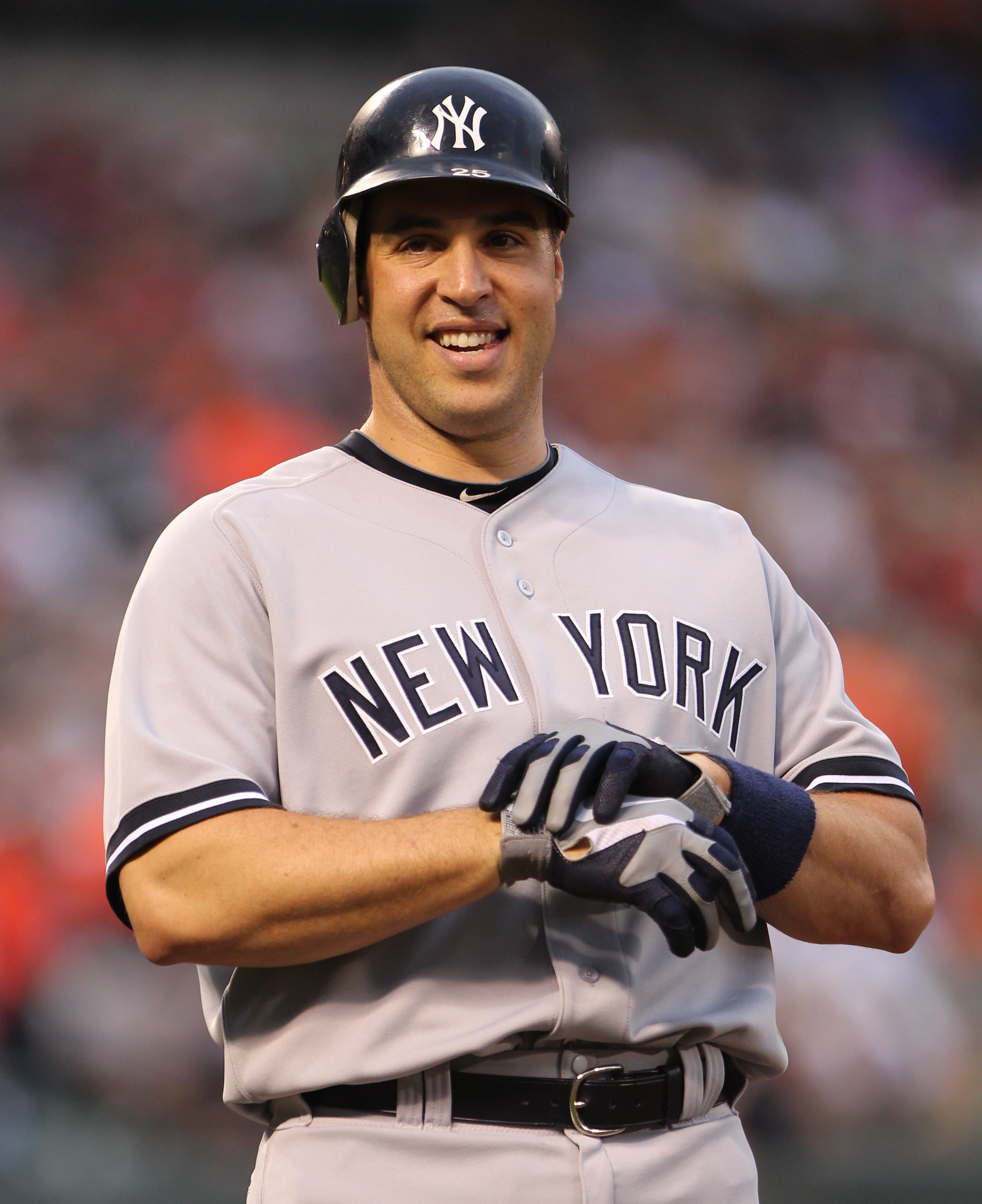
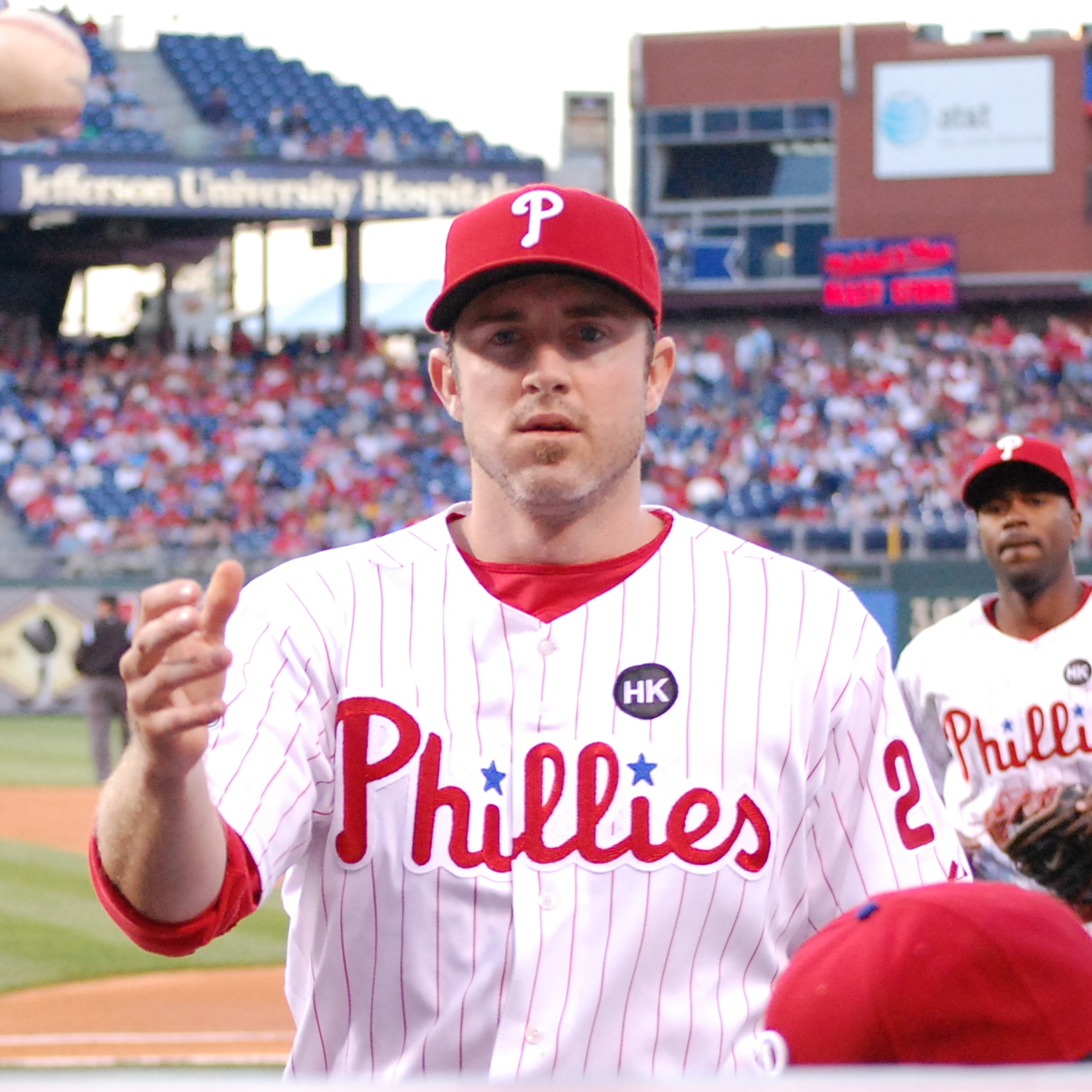
2000 All-Americans included four-time MLB All-Star Mark Teixeira (left) and five-time MLB All-Star Chase Utley (right).

This is a list of college baseball players named first team All-Americans for the 2000 NCAA Division I baseball season. In 2000, there were six generally recognized All-America selectors for baseball: the American Baseball Coaches Association, Baseball America, Collegiate Baseball Newspaper, the National Collegiate Baseball Writers Association, The Sporting News (which did not name a team in 1999), and USA Today Baseball Weekly. In order to be considered a "consensus" All-American, a player must have been selected by at least four of these.

== Key ==
A	American Baseball Coaches Association
B	Baseball America
C	Collegiate Baseball Newspaper
N	National Collegiate Baseball Writers Association
S	The Sporting News
U	USA Today Baseball Weekly
	Member of the National College Baseball Hall of Fame
	Consensus All-American – selected by all six organizations
	Consensus All-American – selected by four or five organizations

== All-Americans ==
Position	Name	School	#	A	B	C	N	S	U	Other awards and honors
Starting pitcher	Jason Anderson	Illinois	1	✓	—	—	—	—	—	
Starting pitcher	Kip Bouknight	South Carolina	6	✓	✓	✓	✓	✓	✓	Golden Spikes Award ABCA Player of the Year Collegiate Baseball Player of the Year Rotary Smith Award
Starting pitcher	Kyle Crowell	Houston	1	—	✓	—	—	—	—	
Starting pitcher	Lenny DiNardo	Stetson	5	✓	✓	✓	✓	✓	—	
Starting pitcher	Chad Hawkins	Baylor	1	—	—	—	—	✓	—	
Starting pitcher	Aaron Heilman	Notre Dame	1	—	—	✓	—	—	—	
Starting pitcher	Adam Johnson	Cal State Fullerton	1	—	—	✓	—	—	—	
Starting pitcher	Shane Komine	Nebraska	4	—	—	✓	✓	✓	✓	
Starting pitcher	Justin Wayne	Stanford	5	✓	✓	✓	—	✓	✓	
Relief pitcher	Cory Scott	East Carolina	4	✓	—	✓	✓	—	✓	
Relief pitcher	Charlie Thames	Texas	3	—	✓	—	✓	✓	—	
Catcher / DH	Brad Cresse	LSU	5	✓	✓	✓	✓	—	✓	Johnny Bench Award
Catcher	Dane Sardinha	Pepperdine	2	—	✓	—	—	✓	—	
First baseman	Todd Faulkner	Auburn	6	✓	✓	✓	✓	✓	✓	
Second baseman	Chris Burke	Tennessee	1	—	—	—	—	—	✓	
Second baseman	Matt Easterday	Georgia Southern	1	—	—	✓	—	—	—	
Second baseman	Chase Utley	UCLA	4	✓	✓	—	✓	✓	—	
Shortstop	Darren Fenster	Rutgers	3	✓	—	—	✓	✓	—	
Shortstop	Tim Hummel	Old Dominion	3	—	✓	✓	—	—	✓	
Third baseman	Mark Teixeira	Georgia Tech	6	✓	✓	✓	✓	✓	✓	Dick Howser Trophy Baseball America Player of the Year The Sporting News Player of the Year
Outfielder	Mike Campo	Penn State	2	—	—	✓	✓	—	—	
Outfielder	Al Corbeil	FIU	1	—	—	✓	—	—	—	
Outfielder	Frank Corr	Stetson	2	✓	—	—	—	✓	—	
Outfielder	Gabe Gross	Auburn	5	✓	✓	✓	✓	✓	—	
Outfielder	Mitch Jones	Arizona State	6	✓	✓	✓	✓	✓	✓	
Outfielder	Chris Morris	The Citadel	1	—	—	—	—	—	✓	
Outfielder	Bill Scott	UCLA	4	✓	✓	✓	—	—	✓	
Designated hitter	Jason Dubois	VCU	2	✓	—	✓	—	—	—	
Utility player	Jeff Bajenaru	Oklahoma	2	✓	—	—	✓	—	—	
Utility player	Ben Diggins	Arizona	3	—	✓	—	—	✓	✓	
Utility player	Casey Myers	Arizona State	2	—	—	—	✓	✓	—	

== See also ==
- List of college baseball awards
