= 1992 College Baseball All-America Team =

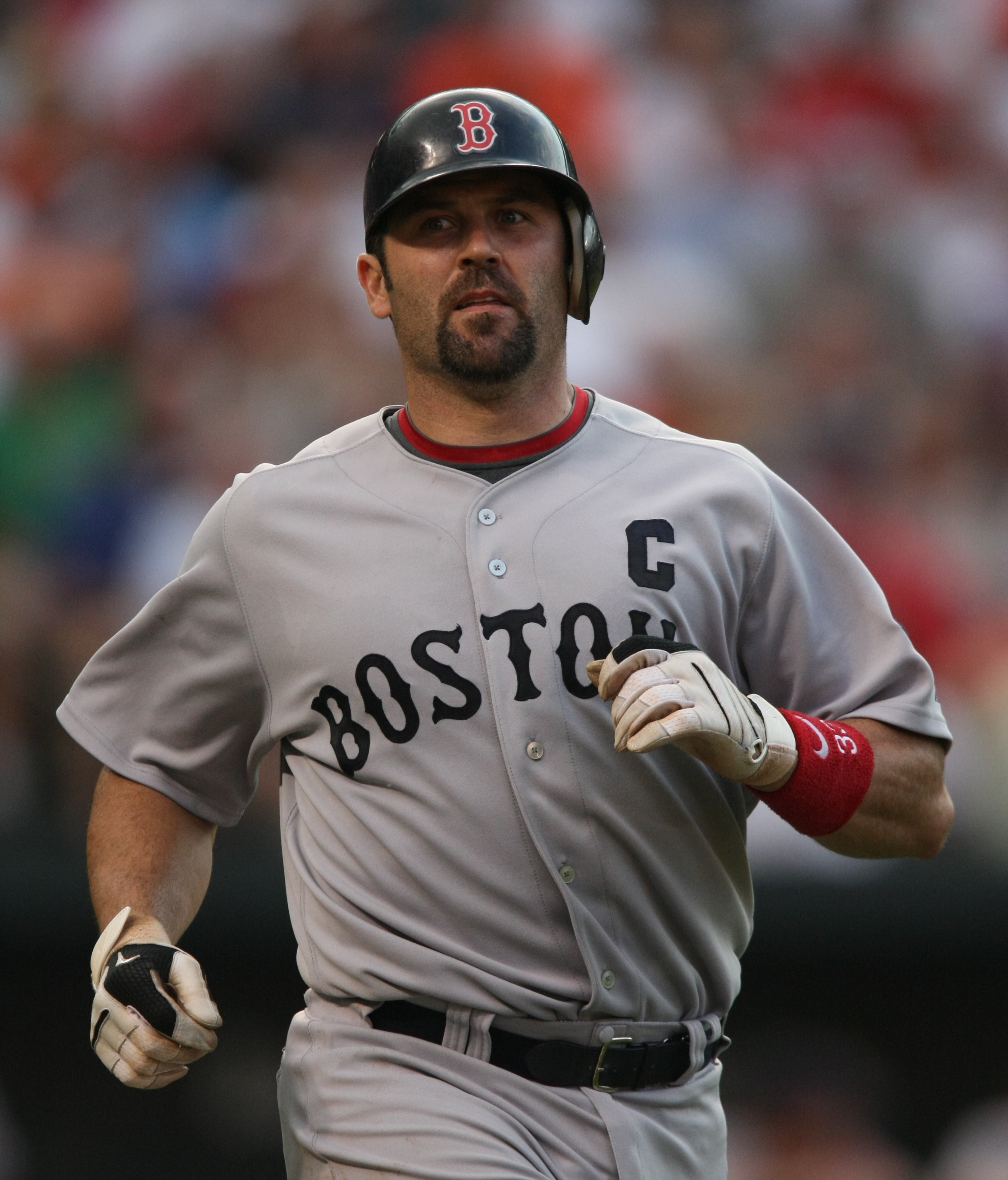
Jason Varitek, who has caught an MLB record four no-hitters, was a selected by the American Baseball Coaches Association, Baseball America, and Collegiate Baseball.

This is a list of college baseball players named first team All-Americans for the 1992 NCAA Division I baseball season. In 1992, there were four generally recognized All-America selectors for baseball: the American Baseball Coaches Association, Baseball America, the Collegiate Baseball Newspaper, and The Sporting News, who named a team after not naming one in 1991. In order to be considered a "consensus" All-American, a player must have been selected by at least three of these.

== Key ==
A	American Baseball Coaches Association
B	Baseball America
C	Collegiate Baseball Newspaper
S	The Sporting News
	Member of the National College Baseball Hall of Fame
	Consensus All-American – selected by all four organizations
	Consensus All-American – selected by three organizations

== All-Americans ==
Position	Name	School	#	A	B	C	S	Other awards and honors
Starting pitcher	Pat Ahearne	Pepperdine	3	✓	✓	✓	—	
Starting pitcher	Jeff Alkire	Miami (FL)	4	✓	✓	✓	✓	
Starting pitcher	Javi DeJesus	Louisiana–Lafayette	1	—	—	✓	—	
Starting pitcher	Lloyd Peever	LSU	3	✓	✓	✓	—	Collegiate Baseball Player of the Year
Starting pitcher	Mike Romano	Tulane	2	—	✓	—	✓	
Relief pitcher	Darren Dreifort	Wichita State	4	✓	✓	✓	✓	
Relief pitcher	Jamie Wolkosky	NC State	2	✓	—	✓	—	
Catcher	Charles Johnson	Miami (FL)	1	—	—	—	✓	
Catcher	Jason Varitek	Georgia Tech	3	✓	✓	✓	—	
First baseman	Doug Hecker	Tennessee	2	—	✓	—	✓	
First baseman	Scott Malone	TCU	1	—	—	✓	—	
First baseman	Sean Shugars	UMBC	1	✓	—	—	—	
Second baseman	Brian Eldridge	Oklahoma	4	✓	✓	✓	✓	
Shortstop	Mike Smith	Indiana	2	—	—	✓	✓	The Sporting News Player of the Year Rotary Smith Award
Shortstop	Craig Wilson	Kansas State	2	✓	✓	—	—	
Third baseman	Dan Kopriva	Louisville	1	—	—	✓	—	
Third baseman	Phil Nevin	Cal State Fullerton	3	✓	✓	—	✓	Golden Spikes Award Baseball America Player of the Year College World Series Most Outstanding Player First overall pick in the 1992 MLB draft
Outfielder	Derek Hacopian	Maryland	2	✓	—	✓	—	
Outfielder	Jeffrey Hammonds	Stanford	4	✓	✓	✓	✓	
Outfielder	Chad McConnell	Creighton	4	✓	✓	✓	✓	
Outfielder	Calvin Murray	Texas	3	✓	✓	—	✓	
Designated hitter	Troy Penix	California	4	✓	✓	✓	✓	
Utility player	Brooks Kieschnick	Texas	1	✓	—	—	—	Dick Howser Trophy ABCA Player of the Year
Utility player	Chris Roberts	Florida State	1	—	—	✓	—	

== See also ==
- List of college baseball awards
