= 2001 College Baseball All-America Team =

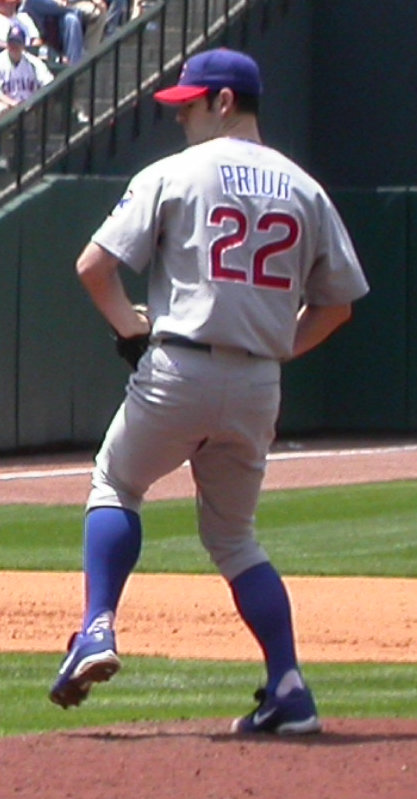
2001 All-Americans included MLB All-Star Mark Prior.

This is a list of college baseball players named first team All-Americans for the 2001 NCAA Division I baseball season. In 2000, there were six generally recognized All-America selectors for baseball: the American Baseball Coaches Association, Baseball America, Collegiate Baseball Newspaper, the National Collegiate Baseball Writers Association, The Sporting News, and USA Today Baseball Weekly. In order to be considered a "consensus" All-American, a player must have been selected by at least four of these.

== Key ==
A	American Baseball Coaches Association
B	Baseball America
C	Collegiate Baseball Newspaper
N	National Collegiate Baseball Writers Association
S	The Sporting News
U	USA Today Baseball Weekly
	Member of the National College Baseball Hall of Fame
	Consensus All-American – selected by all six organizations
	Consensus All-American – selected by four or five organizations

== All-Americans ==
Position	Name	School	#	A	B	C	N	S	U	Other awards and honors
Starting pitcher	Dewon Brazelton	Middle Tennessee	6	✓	✓	✓	✓	✓	✓	
Starting pitcher	Aaron Heilman	Notre Dame	6	✓	✓	✓	✓	✓	✓	
Starting pitcher	Shane Komine	Nebraska	1	—	—	✓	—	—	—	
Starting pitcher	Noah Lowry	Pepperdine	2	—	✓	—	—	✓	—	
Starting pitcher	Justin Pope	UCF	3	—	✓	✓	—	✓	—	
Starting pitcher	Mark Prior	USC	6	✓	✓	✓	✓	✓	✓	Dick Howser Trophy Golden Spikes Award ABCA Player of the Year Baseball America Player of the Year Collegiate Baseball Player of the Year The Sporting News Player of the Year Rotary Smith Award
Starting pitcher	Kirk Saarloos	Cal State Fullerton	3	✓	—	✓	—	✓	—	
Relief pitcher	Lee Gronkiewicz	South Carolina	5	✓	—	✓	✓	✓	✓	
Relief pitcher	Casey Shumaker	Jacksonville	1	—	—	—	✓	—	—	
Catcher	Casey Myers	Arizona State	1	—	—	—	—	✓	—	
Catcher	Kelly Shoppach	Baylor	5	✓	✓	✓	✓	—	✓	Johnny Bench Award
First baseman	Dan Johnson	Nebraska	3	—	—	—	✓	✓	✓	
First baseman / Utility	John Van Benschoten	Kent State	6	✓	✓	✓	✓	✓	✓	
Second baseman	Chris O'Riordan	Stanford	2	✓	—	—	✓	—	—	
Second baseman	Dan Uggla	Memphis	1	—	—	—	—	—	✓	
Second baseman	Michael Woods	Southern	3	—	✓	✓	—	✓	—	
Shortstop	Chris Burke	Tennessee	6	✓	✓	✓	✓	✓	✓	
Third baseman	Jeff Baker	Clemson	2	—	✓	✓	—	—	—	
Third baseman / DH	Jake Gautreau	Tulane	5	✓	✓	—	✓	✓	✓	
Outfielder / DH	Brian Baron	UCLA	3	—	—	✓	✓	—	✓	
Outfielder	Ryan Brunner	Northern Iowa	3	✓	—	✓	—	✓	—	
Outfielder	John Cole	Nebraska	2	✓	✓	—	—	—	—	
Outfielder	Shelley Duncan	Arizona	4	—	✓	✓	—	✓	✓	
Outfielder	John-Ford Griffin	Florida State	6	✓	✓	✓	✓	✓	✓	
Outfielder	Jason Law	Monmouth	2	✓	—	✓	—	—	—	
Designated hitter	Scott Henley	Georgia Southern	1	✓	—	—	—	—	—	
Designated hitter	Matt Hooper	Nebraska	1	—	—	—	—	✓	—	
Utility player / OF	Cory Sullivan	Wake Forest	4	✓	✓	✓	✓	—	—	

== See also ==
- List of college baseball awards
