= 2024 College Baseball All-America Team =

This is a list of college baseball players named first team All-Americans for the 2024 NCAA Division I baseball season. Since 2024, there have been six generally recognized All-America selectors for baseball: the American Baseball Coaches Association, Baseball America, the College Baseball Foundation, D1Baseball.com, the National Collegiate Baseball Writers Association, and Perfect Game. In order to be considered a "consensus" All-American, a player must have been selected by at least four of these.

== Key ==
A	American Baseball Coaches Association
B	Baseball America
F	College Baseball Foundation
D	D1Baseball.com
N	National Collegiate Baseball Writers Association
P	Perfect Game
	Member of the National College Baseball Hall of Fame
	Consensus All-American – selected by all six organizations
	Consensus All-American – selected by four or five organizations

== All-Americans ==
Position	Name	School	#	A	B	F	D	N	P	Other awards and honors
Starting pitcher	Jamie Arnold	Florida State	4	✓	—	—	✓	✓	✓	
Starting pitcher	Chase Burns	Wake Forest	6	✓	✓	✓	✓	✓	✓	
Starting pitcher	Ryan Gallagher	UC Santa Barbara	1	—	—	—	—	✓	—	
Starting pitcher	Ryan Johnson	Dallas Baptist	4	—	✓	—	✓	✓	✓	
Starting pitcher	Michael Ross	Samford	1	—	—	—	—	✓	—	
Starting pitcher	Hagen Smith	Arkansas	6	✓	✓	✓	✓	✓	✓	ABCA Pitcher of the Year National Pitcher of the Year
Starting pitcher	Trey Yesavage	East Carolina	6	✓	✓	✓	✓	✓	✓	
Relief pitcher	Evan Aschenbeck	Texas A&M	5	✓	—	✓	✓	✓	✓	Stopper of the Year
Relief pitcher	Ethan Bates	Louisiana Tech	2	—	—	✓	—	✓	—	
Relief pitcher	Charlie Beilenson	Duke	5	✓	✓	—	✓	✓	✓	
Relief pitcher	Griffin Herring	LSU	1	—	—	✓	—	—	—	
Relief pitcher	Bridger Holmes	Oregon State	1	—	—	—	—	✓	—	
Relief pitcher	Wyatt Lunsford-Shenkman	East Carolina	1	—	✓	—	—	—	—	
Relief pitcher	Conner Thurman	San Diego	1	—	—	—	—	✓	—	
Catcher	Jackson Appel	Texas A&M	1	—	—	—	—	✓	—	
Catcher	Jacob Cozart	NC State	1	—	—	✓	—	—	—	
Catcher	Walker Janek	Sam Houston	5	✓	✓	✓	✓	—	✓	Buster Posey Award
First baseman	Blake Burke	Tennessee	6	✓	✓	✓	✓	✓	✓	
First baseman	Nick Kurtz	Wake Forest	1	—	—	✓	—	—	—	
Second baseman	Travis Bazzana	Oregon State	6	✓	✓	✓	✓	✓	✓	First overall pick in the 2024 MLB draft
Second baseman / DH	Christian Moore	Tennessee	3	—	✓	—	✓	—	✓	
Shortstop	Kyle DeBarge	Louisiana	3	—	✓	—	✓	✓	—	
Shortstop	Josh Kuroda-Grauer	Rutgers	3	✓	—	✓	—	—	✓	
Shortstop	Griff O'Ferrall	Virginia	1	—	—	✓	—	—	—	Brooks Wallace Award
Third baseman	Charlie Condon	Georgia	6	✓	✓	✓	✓	✓	✓	Dick Howser Trophy Golden Spikes Award Baseball America Player of the Year
Third baseman	Alec Makarewicz	NC State	1	—	—	✓	—	—	—	
Outfielder	Drew Burress	Georgia Tech	2	—	✓	—	—	✓	—	
Outfielder / DH	Jakob Christian	San Diego	2	✓	—	✓	—	—	—	
Outfielder	Vance Honeycutt	North Carolina	4	✓	—	✓	✓	—	✓	
Outfielder	Jace LaViolette	Texas A&M	4	—	✓	✓	✓	✓	—	
Outfielder / DH	Lyle Miller-Green	Austin Peay	3	—	—	✓	—	✓	✓	
Outfielder	Braden Montgomery	Texas A&M	3	✓	—	—	—	✓	✓	
Outfielder	James Tibbs III	Florida State	6	✓	✓	✓	✓	✓	✓	
Designated hitter	Caleb Cozart	UNC Greensboro	2	✓	—	—	—	✓	—	
Utility player	Jac Caglianone	Florida	6	✓	✓	✓	✓	✓	✓	ABCA Position Player of the Year John Olerud Award

== See also ==
- List of college baseball awards
