= 2019 College Baseball All-America Team =

This is a list of college baseball players named first team All-Americans for the 2019 NCAA Division I baseball season. From 2019 to 2023, there were seven generally recognized All-America selectors for baseball: the American Baseball Coaches Association, Baseball America, Collegiate Baseball Newspaper, the College Baseball Foundation, D1Baseball.com, the National Collegiate Baseball Writers Association, and Perfect Game. In order to be considered a "consensus" All-American, a player must have been selected by at least four of these.

== Key ==
A	American Baseball Coaches Association
B	Baseball America
C	Collegiate Baseball Newspaper
F	College Baseball Foundation
D	D1Baseball.com
N	National Collegiate Baseball Writers Association
P	Perfect Game
	Member of the National College Baseball Hall of Fame
	Consensus All-American – selected by all seven organizations
	Consensus All-American – selected by four, five, or six organizations

== All-Americans ==
Position	Name	School	#	A	B	C	F	D	N	P	Other awards and honors
Starting pitcher	Jake Agnos	East Carolina	2	—	—	✓	—	—	✓	—	
Starting pitcher	Isaiah Campbell	Arkansas	1	✓	—	—	—	—	—	—	
Starting pitcher	Reid Detmers	Louisville	4	✓	—	—	—	✓	✓	✓	
Starting pitcher	Ryan Garcia	UCLA	7	✓	✓	✓	✓	✓	✓	✓	
Starting pitcher	Alek Manoah	West Virginia	5	—	✓	✓	—	✓	✓	✓	
Starting pitcher	Ethan Small	Mississippi State	7	✓	✓	✓	✓	✓	✓	✓	ABCA Pitcher of the Year National Pitcher of the Year
Starting pitcher	Noah Song	Navy	7	✓	✓	✓	✓	✓	✓	✓	
Relief pitcher	Garrett Acton	Illinois	2	—	—	—	—	—	✓	✓	
Relief pitcher	Tyler Brown	Vanderbilt	2	—	—	—	✓	—	—	✓	
Relief pitcher	Kyle Hill	Baylor	5	✓	✓	✓	—	✓	✓	—	
Relief pitcher	Reeves Martin	New Orleans	1	—	—	—	—	—	✓	—	
Relief pitcher	Holden Powell	UCLA	1	—	—	—	—	—	✓	—	Stopper of the Year
Relief pitcher	Jake Wallace	UConn	5	✓	✓	—	✓	✓	✓	—	
Catcher	Adley Rutschman	Oregon State	7	✓	✓	✓	✓	✓	✓	✓	Dick Howser Trophy Golden Spikes Award ABCA Position Player of the Year Baseball America Player of the Year Collegiate Baseball Player of the Year Buster Posey Award Johnny Bench Award First overall pick in the 2019 MLB draft
First baseman	Tristan Peterson	New Mexico State	1	—	—	✓	—	—	—	—	
First baseman	Bobby Seymour	Wake Forest	1	—	—	✓	—	—	—	—	
First baseman	Andrew Vaughn	California	6	✓	✓	—	✓	✓	✓	✓	
Second baseman	Cameron Cannon	Arizona	2	—	✓	—	—	—	✓	—	
Second baseman	Justin Foscue	Mississippi State	1	—	—	—	✓	—	—	—	
Second baseman	Nick Gonzales	New Mexico State	4	✓	—	✓	—	✓	—	✓	
Shortstop	Grae Kessinger	Ole Miss	1	—	—	—	✓	—	—	—	Brooks Wallace Award
Shortstop	Jody Ortiz	New Mexico State	1	—	—	✓	—	—	—	—	
Shortstop	Ethan Paul	Vanderbilt	1	—	—	—	—	—	—	✓	
Shortstop	Will Wilson	NC State	3	✓	✓	—	—	—	✓	—	
Third baseman	Kody Hoese	Tulane	6	✓	✓	✓	—	✓	✓	✓	
Third baseman / SS	Josh Jung	Texas Tech	2	—	—	—	✓	✓	—	—	
Outfielder	Hunter Bishop	Arizona State	5	✓	✓	—	—	✓	✓	✓	
Outfielder	J. J. Bleday	Vanderbilt	7	✓	✓	✓	✓	✓	✓	✓	
Outfielder	Jordan Brewer	Michigan	1	—	—	—	✓	—	—	—	
Outfielder	Peyton Burdick	Wright State	1	✓	—	—	—	—	—	—	
Outfielder	Jake Mangum	Mississippi State	3	✓	—	—	✓	—	✓	—	Senior CLASS Award
Outfielder	Jake Sanford	Western Kentucky	5	✓	—	✓	—	✓	✓	✓	
Outfielder	Kevin Strohschein	Tennessee Tech	1	—	—	✓	—	—	—	—	
Outfielder	Matt Wallner	Southern Miss	1	—	✓	—	—	—	—	—	
Designated hitter	Bryce Ball	Dallas Baptist	1	—	—	—	—	—	✓	—	
Designated hitter	Austin Martin	Vanderbilt	3	—	✓	—	✓	✓	—	—	
Designated hitter	Aaron Sabato	North Carolina	2	✓	—	✓	—	—	—	—	
Designated hitter	Cameron Warren	Texas Tech	1	—	—	—	—	—	—	✓	
Utility player	Alec Burleson	East Carolina	5	✓	—	✓	—	✓	✓	✓	
Utility player	Aaron Schunk	Georgia	2	—	✓	—	✓	—	—	—	John Olerud Award

== See also ==
- List of college baseball awards
