= 1949 College Baseball All-America Team =

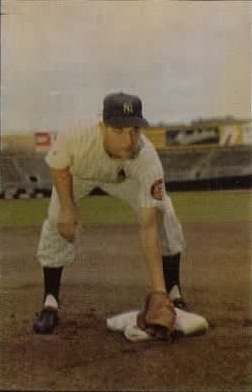
1949 All-Americans included seven-year Major League Baseball veteran Jim Brideweser

This is a list of college baseball players named first team All-Americans for the 1949 NCAA baseball season. From 1947 to 1963, the American Baseball Coaches Association was the only generally recognized All-America selector, so any player selected by the ABCA is considered a "consensus" All-American.

== Key ==
A	American Baseball Coaches Association
	Member of the National College Baseball Hall of Fame
	Consensus All-American – selected the ABCA

== All-Americans ==
Position	Name	School	#	A	Other awards and honors
Pitcher	Jack Bruner	Iowa	1	✓	
Pitcher	Murray Wall	Texas	1	✓	
Catcher	Dominic Fucci	Kentucky	1	✓	
First baseman	Tom Hamilton	Texas	1	✓	College World Series Most Outstanding Player
Second baseman	Charlie Teague	Wake Forest	1	✓	
Shortstop	Jim Brideweser	USC	1	✓	
Third baseman	Gene Hooks	Wake Forest	1	✓	
Outfielder	Bill Renna	Santa Clara	1	✓	
Outfielder	Don Ritter	Indiana	1	✓	
Outfielder	Walt Slovenski	Syracuse	1	✓	

== See also ==
- List of college baseball awards
