= 2017 College Baseball All-America Team =

This is a list of college baseball players named first team All-Americans for the 2017 NCAA Division I baseball season. From 2015 to 2018, there were six generally recognized All-America selectors for baseball: the American Baseball Coaches Association, Baseball America, Collegiate Baseball Newspaper, D1Baseball.com, the National Collegiate Baseball Writers Association, and Perfect Game. In order to be considered a "consensus" All-American, a player must have been selected by at least four of these.

== Key ==
A	American Baseball Coaches Association
B	Baseball America
C	Collegiate Baseball Newspaper
D	D1Baseball.com
N	National Collegiate Baseball Writers Association
P	Perfect Game
	Member of the National College Baseball Hall of Fame
	Consensus All-American – selected by all six organizations
	Consensus All-American – selected by four or five organizations

== All-Americans ==
Position	Name	School	#	A	B	C	D	N	P	Other awards and honors
Starting pitcher	Corey Abbott	Loyola Marymount	3	—	✓	✓	—	—	✓	
Starting pitcher	J. B. Bukauskas	North Carolina	4	✓	✓	✓	—	✓	—	
Starting pitcher	Trey Cumbie	Houston	1	—	—	—	—	✓	—	
Starting pitcher	Steven Gingery	Texas Tech	6	✓	✓	✓	✓	✓	✓	National Pitcher of the Year
Starting pitcher	Luke Heimlich	Oregon State	1	—	—	✓	—	—	—	
Starting pitcher	Tyler Holton	Florida State	2	✓	—	—	✓	—	—	
Starting pitcher	Eli Morgan	Gonzaga	1	—	—	—	—	—	✓	
Starting pitcher	David Peterson	Oregon	5	✓	—	✓	✓	✓	✓	
Starting pitcher	Jake Thompson	Oregon State	6	✓	✓	✓	✓	✓	✓	
Relief pitcher	Michael Byrne	Florida	3	—	—	—	✓	✓	✓	
Relief pitcher	Lincoln Henzman	Louisville	2	—	—	✓	—	✓	—	Stopper of the Year
Relief pitcher	Josh Hiatt	North Carolina	2	—	✓	—	—	✓	—	
Relief pitcher	Colton Hock	Stanford	2	✓	—	—	—	✓	—	
Relief pitcher	Wyatt Marks	Louisiana–Lafayette	1	—	✓	—	—	—	—	
Relief pitcher	Nick Sandlin	Southern Miss	1	—	—	—	—	—	✓	
Relief pitcher	Kenyon Yovan	Oregon	1	—	—	—	—	✓	—	
Catcher	Riley Adams	San Diego	1	—	—	—	—	✓	—	
Catcher	David Banuelos	Long Beach State	1	—	✓	—	—	—	—	
Catcher	Ben Breazeale	Wake Forest	1	—	—	✓	—	—	—	
Catcher	Evan Skoug	TCU	3	✓	—	—	✓	—	✓	
First baseman	Brent Rooker	Mississippi State	6	✓	✓	✓	✓	✓	✓	Collegiate Baseball Player of the Year
Second baseman	Nick Madrigal	Oregon State	3	✓	✓	—	✓	—	—	
Second baseman	Riley Mahan	Kentucky	1	—	—	—	—	—	✓	
Second baseman	Braden Shewmake	Texas A&M	2	—	—	✓	—	✓	—	
Shortstop	Jeremy Eierman	Missouri State	3	—	—	—	✓	✓	✓	
Shortstop	Logan Warmoth	North Carolina	3	✓	✓	✓	—	—	—	Brooks Wallace Award
Third baseman	Jake Burger	Missouri State	3	✓	✓	—	—	✓	—	
Third baseman	Drew Ellis	Louisville	4	✓	—	✓	✓	—	✓	
Outfielder	Greg Deichmann	LSU	5	✓	✓	✓	—	✓	✓	
Outfielder	Stuart Fairchild	Wake Forest	5	—	✓	✓	✓	✓	✓	
Outfielder	Adam Haseley	Virginia	3	✓	✓	—	✓	—	—	
Outfielder	Niko Hulsizer	Morehead State	3	—	—	✓	—	✓	✓	
Outfielder	Garrett McCain	Oklahoma	1	✓	—	—	—	—	—	
Outfielder	Matt Wallner	Southern Miss	2	—	—	—	✓	✓	—	
Designated hitter	Keston Hiura	UC Irvine	6	✓	✓	✓	✓	✓	✓	
Utility player	Brendan McKay	Louisville	6	✓	✓	✓	✓	✓	✓	Dick Howser Trophy Golden Spikes Award ABCA Player of the Year Baseball America Player of the Year Collegiate Baseball Player of the Year John Olerud Award

== See also ==
- List of college baseball awards
