= 1971 College Baseball All-America Team =

This is a list of college baseball players named first team All-Americans for the 1971 NCAA University Division baseball season. From 1964 to 1980, there were two generally recognized All-America selectors for baseball: the American Baseball Coaches Association and The Sporting News.

== Key ==
A	American Baseball Coaches Association
S	The Sporting News
	Member of the National College Baseball Hall of Fame
	Consensus All-American – selected by both organizations
	Consensus All-American – selected by one organization

== All-Americans ==
Position	Name	School	#	A	S	Other awards and honors
Pitcher	Jim Burton	Michigan	1	—	✓	
Pitcher	Steve Busby	USC	1	✓	—	
Pitcher	Jack Hittson	Princeton	1	✓	—	
Pitcher	Burt Hooton	Texas	2	✓	✓	
Catcher	Glenn Borgmann	South Alabama	1	—	✓	
Catcher	Pete Varney	Harvard	1	✓	—	
First baseman	Roger Schmuck	Arizona State	2	✓	✓	
Second baseman	Jim Cox	Iowa	1	—	✓	
Second baseman	Bobby Waits	Washington State	1	✓	—	
Shortstop	Alan Bannister	Arizona State	1	✓	—	
Shortstop	Mike Schmidt	Ohio	1	—	✓	
Third baseman	Dave Chalk	Texas	1	—	✓	
Third baseman	Phil Still	Mississippi State	2	✓	✓	
Outfielder	Rob Ellis	Michigan State	2	✓	✓	The Sporting News Player of the Year
Outfielder	Dave Elmendorf	Texas A&M	1	✓	—	
Outfielder	Dane Iorg	BYU	2	✓	✓	
Outfielder	Bob Koepell	Bradley	1	—	✓	
Outfielder	Bill Sharp	Ohio State	1	—	✓	

== See also ==
- List of college baseball awards
