= 1950 College Baseball All-America Team =

This is a list of college baseball players named first team All-Americans for the 1950 NCAA baseball season. From 1947 to 1963, the American Baseball Coaches Association was the only generally recognized All-America selector, so any player selected by the ABCA is considered a "consensus" All-American.

== Key ==
A	American Baseball Coaches Association
	Member of the National College Baseball Hall of Fame
	Consensus All-American – selected the ABCA

== All-Americans ==
Position	Name	School	#	A	Other awards and honors
Pitcher	Tom Casey	NYU	1	✓	
Pitcher	Murray Wall	Texas	1	✓	
Catcher	Robert Murray	Arizona	1	✓	
First Baseman	Fred Taylor	Ohio State	1	✓	
Second baseman	Charlie Teague	Wake Forest	1	✓	
Shortstop	John Hrasch	Ohio	1	✓	
Third baseman	William Killinger	Lafayette	1	✓	
Outfielder	Robert Cerv	Nebraska	1	✓	
Outfielder	Jay Roundy	USC	1	✓	
Outfielder	Ray Van Cleef	Rutgers	1	✓	College World Series Most Outstanding Player

== See also ==
- List of college baseball awards
