= 1969 College Baseball All-America Team =

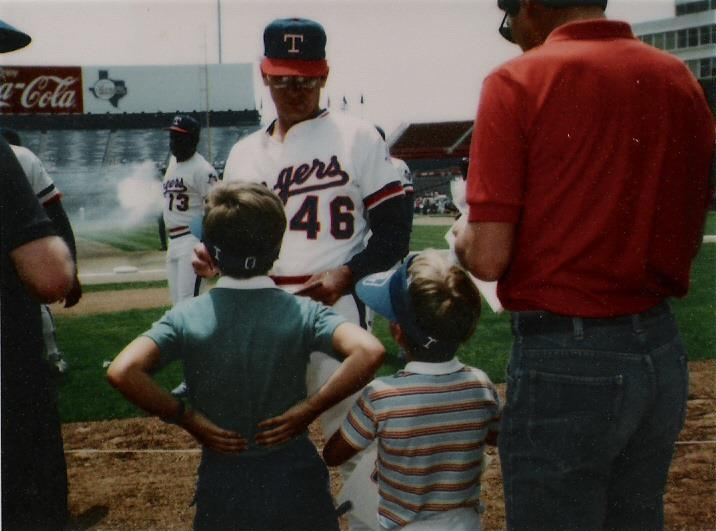
1969 All-Americans included National College Baseball Hall of Fame Inductee Burt Hooton.

This is a list of college baseball players named first team All-Americans for the 1969 NCAA University Division baseball season. From 1964 to 1980, there were two generally recognized All-America selectors for baseball: the American Baseball Coaches Association and The Sporting News.

== Key ==
A	American Baseball Coaches Association
S	The Sporting News
	Member of the National College Baseball Hall of Fame
	Consensus All-American – selected by both organizations
	Consensus All-American – selected by one organization

== All-Americans ==
Position	Name	School	#	A	S	Other awards and honors
Pitcher	Larry Gura	Arizona State	2	✓	✓	
Pitcher	Burt Hooton	Texas	2	✓	✓	
Catcher	Harry Kendrick	Michigan State	1	—	✓	
Catcher	Bob Williams	Washington State	1	✓	—	
First baseman	Mike Walseth	Minnesota	2	✓	✓	
Second baseman	Vic Ambrose	Albuquerque	1	—	✓	
Second baseman	Dick Gold	Florida State	1	✓	—	
Shortstop	Roger Metzger	St. Edward's	1	—	✓	
Shortstop	Bill Stein	Southern Illinois	1	✓	—	
Third baseman	Bill Clark	Southern Illinois	1	—	✓	
Third baseman	Les Rogers	Tulsa	1	✓	—	
Outfielder	Noel Jenke	Minnesota	1	—	✓	
Outfielder	Bob Long	Texas A&M	1	✓	—	
Outfielder	Rick Miller	Michigan State	1	—	✓	
Outfielder	Paul Powell	Arizona State	2	✓	✓	The Sporting News Player of the Year
Outfielder	Larry Pyle	Miami (FL)	1	✓	—	

== See also ==
- List of college baseball awards
