= 2020 College Baseball All-America Team =

This is a list of college baseball players named first team All-Americans for the 2020 NCAA Division I baseball season. From 2019 to 2023, there were seven generally recognized All-America selectors for baseball: the American Baseball Coaches Association, Baseball America, Collegiate Baseball Newspaper, the College Baseball Foundation, D1Baseball.com, the National Collegiate Baseball Writers Association, and Perfect Game. However, with the COVID-19 pandemic canceling the season in mid-March, only Collegiate Baseball Newspaper released a team. Thus anyone selected by that organization is considered a "consensus" All-American.

Perfect Game named an "Honor Roll" but explicitly clarified that it was not intended to be an All-American team.

== Key ==
C	Collegiate Baseball Newspaper
	Member of the National College Baseball Hall of Fame
	Consensus All-American – selected by Collegiate Baseball Newspaper

== All-Americans ==
Position	Name	School	#	C	Other awards and honors
Starting pitcher	Reid Detmers	Louisville	1	✓	
Starting pitcher	Bryce Jarvis	Duke	1	✓	
Starting pitcher	Landon Knack	East Tennessee State	1	✓	
Starting pitcher	Asa Lacy	Texas A&M	1	✓	
Starting pitcher	Zach Pettway	UCLA	1	✓	
Starting pitcher	Connor Prielipp	Alabama	1	✓	
Relief pitcher	Jeff Hakanson	UCF	1	✓	
Catcher	A. J. Lewis	Eastern Kentucky	1	✓	
First baseman	Spencer Torkelson	Arizona State	1	✓	First overall pick in the 2020 MLB draft
Second baseman	Brooks Carlson	Samford	1	✓	
Shortstop	Nick Gonzales	New Mexico State	1	✓	Collegiate Baseball Player of the Year
Third baseman	Tyler Keenan	Ole Miss	1	✓	
Outfielder	Zach DeLoach	Texas A&M	1	✓	
Outfielder	Heston Kjerstad	Arkansas	1	✓	
Outfielder	Austin Martin	Vanderbilt	1	✓	
Designated hitter	Kenyon Yovan	Oregon	1	✓	
Utility player	Alec Burleson	East Carolina	1	✓	

== See also ==
- List of college baseball awards
