= 1970 College Baseball All-America Team =

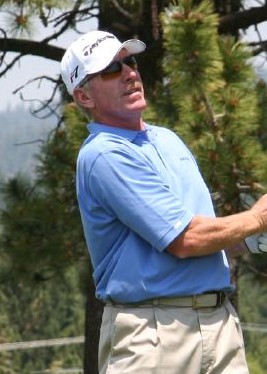
1970 All-Americans included National Baseball Hall of Fame Inductee Mike Schmidt.

This is a list of college baseball players named first team All-Americans for the 1970 NCAA University Division baseball season. From 1964 to 1980, there were two generally recognized All-America selectors for baseball: the American Baseball Coaches Association and The Sporting News.

== Key ==
A	American Baseball Coaches Association
S	The Sporting News
	Member of the National College Baseball Hall of Fame
	Consensus All-American – selected by both organizations
	Consensus All-American – selected by one organization

== All-Americans ==
Position	Name	School	#	A	S	Other awards and honors
Pitcher	Steve Dunning	Stanford	1	—	✓	The Sporting News Player of the Year
Pitcher	Burt Hooton	Texas	1	✓	—	
Pitcher	Brent Strom	USC	2	✓	✓	
Catcher	Tom Harmon	Texas	1	—	✓	
Catcher	Arnold Holtberg	Princeton	1	✓	—	
First baseman	Doug Howard	BYU	1	✓	—	
First baseman	Pete Varney	Harvard	1	—	✓	
Second baseman	Dick Nichols	Florida State	1	—	✓	
Second baseman	Dave Yates	Delaware	1	✓	—	
Shortstop	Lee Richard	Southern	1	—	✓	
Shortstop	Mike Schmidt	Ohio	1	✓	—	
Third baseman	Dan Adams	Ole Miss	1	—	✓	
Third baseman	Pete Duncan	Washington State	1	✓	—	
Outfielder	Sam Ewing	Tennessee	2	✓	✓	
Outfielder	Gene Hiser	Maryland	2	✓	✓	
Outfielder	Dave Kingman	USC	1	—	✓	
Outfielder	Steve Mikulic	Arizona	1	✓	—	

== See also ==
- List of college baseball awards
