= 1966 College Baseball All-America Team =

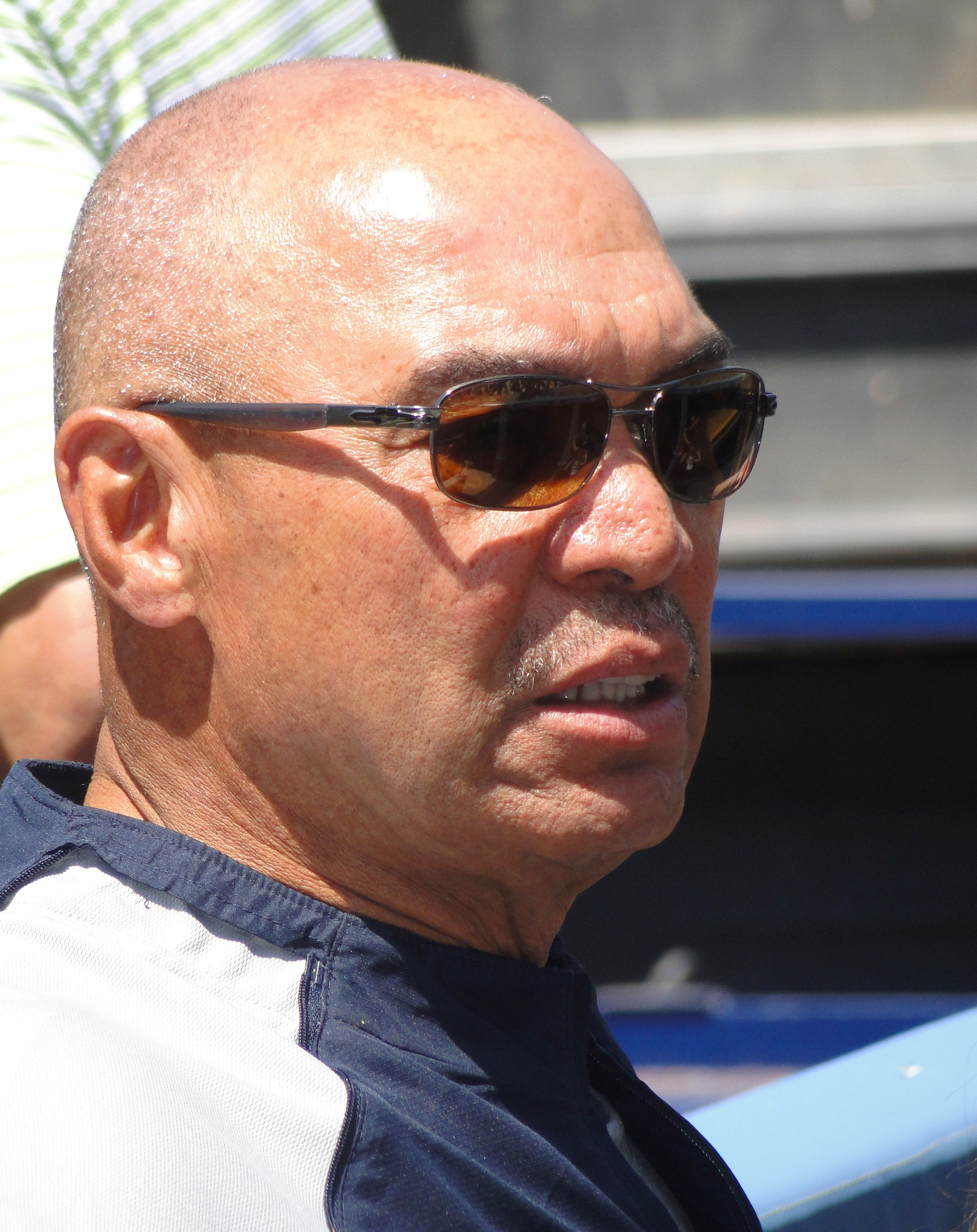
1966 All-Americans included National Baseball Hall of Fame inductee Reggie Jackson.

This is a list of college baseball players named first team All-Americans for the 1966 NCAA University Division baseball season. From 1964 to 1980, there were two generally recognized All-America selectors for baseball: the American Baseball Coaches Association and The Sporting News.

== Key ==
A	American Baseball Coaches Association
S	The Sporting News
	Member of the National College Baseball Hall of Fame
	Consensus All-American – selected by both organizations
	Consensus All-American – selected by one organization

== All-Americans ==
Position	Name	School	#	A	S	Other awards and honors
Pitcher	Steve Arlin	Ohio State	2	✓	✓	College World Series Most Outstanding Player
Pitcher	Bill Frost	California	1	✓	—	
Pitcher	Pat O'Brien	Arizona	1	—	✓	
Catcher	Jim Hibbs	Stanford	2	✓	✓	
First baseman	Ed Maras	South Dakota State	1	✓	—	
First baseman	Dan Talbott	North Carolina	1	—	✓	
Second baseman	Matt Galante	St. John's	1	✓	—	
Second baseman	Ray Henningsen	Santa Clara	1	—	✓	
Shortstop	Eddie Leon	Arizona	2	✓	✓	
Third baseman	Jim DeNeff	Indiana	1	—	✓	
Third baseman	Bob Willet	Ohio	1	✓	—	
Outfielder	Dale Ford	Washington State	1	✓	—	
Outfielder	Reggie Jackson	Arizona State	2	✓	✓	The Sporting News Player of the Year
Outfielder	Jim Lyttle	Florida State	2	✓	✓	
Outfielder	Del Unser	Mississippi State	1	—	✓	

== See also ==
- List of college baseball awards
