= 1965 College Baseball All-America Team =

This is a list of college baseball players named first team All-Americans for the 1965 NCAA University Division baseball season. From 1964 to 1980, there were two generally recognized All-America selectors for baseball: the American Baseball Coaches Association and The Sporting News.

== Key ==
A	American Baseball Coaches Association
S	The Sporting News
	Member of the National College Baseball Hall of Fame
	Consensus All-American – selected by both organizations
	Consensus All-American – selected by one organization

== All-Americans ==
Position	Name	School	#	A	S	Other awards and honors
Pitcher	Steve Arlin	Ohio State	2	✓	✓	
Pitcher	Ken Holtzman	Illinois	1	—	✓	
Pitcher	John Marcum Jr.	Saint Louis	1	✓	—	
Catcher	John E. Olerud	Washington State	2	✓	✓	
First baseman	Arnie Chonko	Ohio State	1	—	✓	
First baseman	Pete Middlekauff	Stanford	1	✓	—	
Second baseman	Luis Lagunas	Arizona State	2	✓	✓	
Shortstop	Eddie Leon	Arizona	1	—	✓	
Shortstop	Archie Roberts	Columbia	1	✓	—	
Third baseman	Sal Bando	Arizona State	1	—	✓	College World Series Most Outstanding Player
Third baseman	Mike McClure	Texas A&M	1	✓	—	
Outfielder	Jim Dix	Saint Louis	1	—	✓	
Outfielder	Bill Guerrant	Western Michigan	1	✓	—	
Outfielder	Rick Monday	Arizona State	2	✓	✓	The Sporting News Player of the Year First overall pick in the 1965 MLB draft
Outfielder	Billy Wolff	Cincinnati	2	✓	✓	

== See also ==
- List of college baseball awards
