= 1984 College Baseball All-America Team =

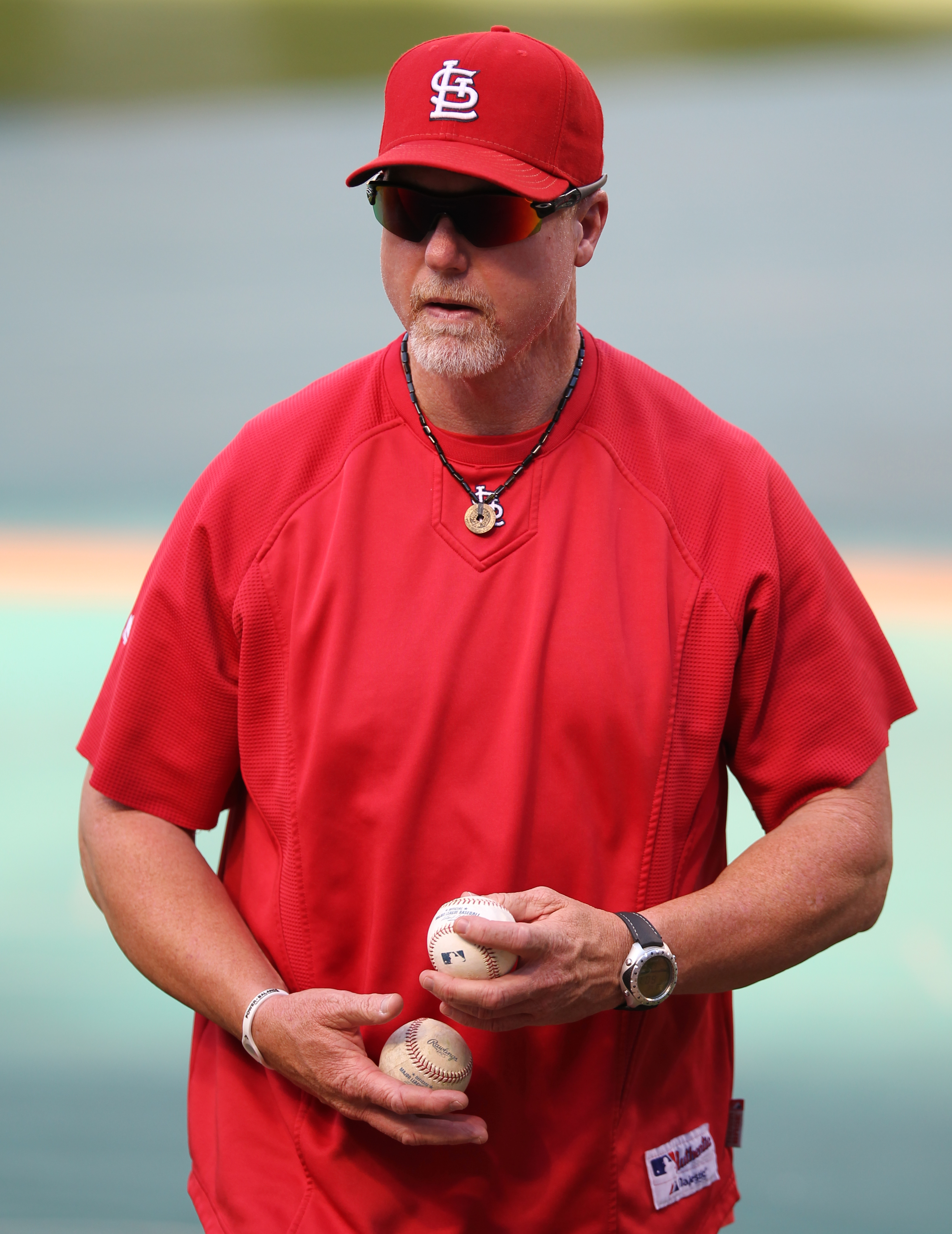
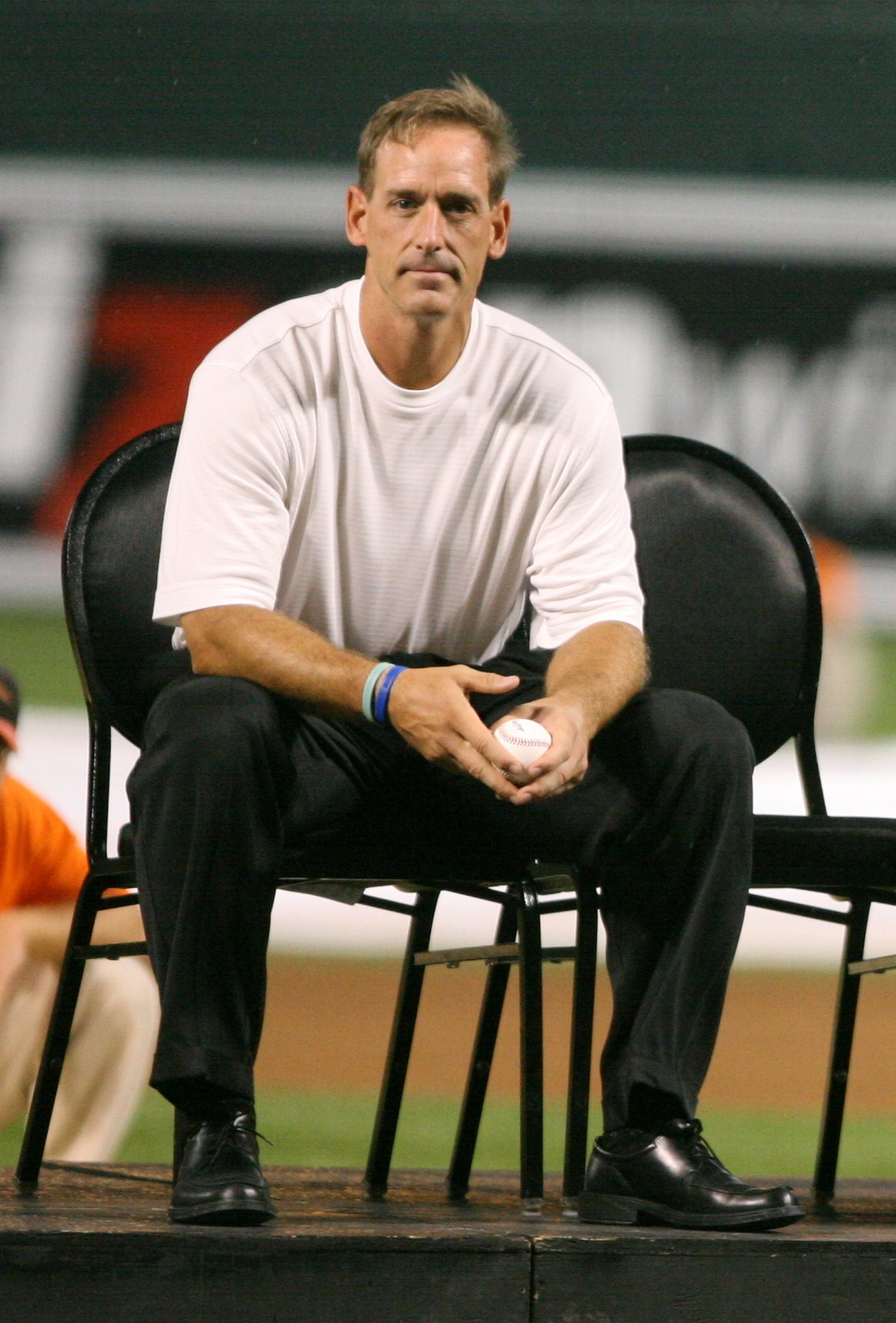
1984 All-Americans included twelve-time MLB All-Star Mark McGwire and National College Baseball Hall of Fame inductee B.J. Surhoff.

This is a list of college baseball players named first team All-Americans for the 1984 NCAA Division I baseball season. From 1981 to 1990, there were three generally recognized All-America selectors for baseball: the American Baseball Coaches Association, Baseball America, and The Sporting News. In order to be considered a "consensus" All-American, a player must have been selected by at least two of these.

== Key ==
A	American Baseball Coaches Association
B	Baseball America
S	The Sporting News
	Member of the National College Baseball Hall of Fame
	Consensus All-American – selected by all three organizations
	Consensus All-American – selected by two organizations

== All-Americans ==
Position	Name	School	#	A	B	S	Other awards and honors
Pitcher	Scott Bankhead	North Carolina	2	✓	✓	—	
Pitcher	Mike Dunne	Bradley	1	—	—	✓	
Pitcher	Drew Hall	Morehead State	1	—	—	✓	
Pitcher	John Hoover	Fresno State	2	✓	✓	—	Baseball America Pitcher of the Year
Pitcher	Todd Simmons	Cal State Fullerton	1	✓	—	—	
Pitcher	Greg Swindell	Texas	1	—	✓	—	Baseball America Freshman of the Year
Pitcher	Scott Wright	Cal State Fullerton	1	—	✓	—	
Catcher	John Marzano	Temple	2	—	✓	✓	
Catcher	B. J. Surhoff	North Carolina	1	✓	—	—	
First baseman	Mark McGwire	USC	3	✓	✓	✓	The Sporting News Player of the Year
Second baseman	Billy Bates	Texas	2	✓	—	✓	
Second baseman	Bob Ralston	Arizona	1	—	✓	—	
Shortstop	Barry Larkin	Michigan	1	✓	—	—	
Shortstop / Utility	Cory Snyder	BYU	3	✓	✓	✓	
Third baseman	Ken Caminiti	San Jose State	1	—	—	✓	
Third baseman	David Denny	Texas	1	—	✓	—	
Third baseman	Gene Larkin	Columbia	1	✓	—	—	
Outfielder	Alan Cockrell	Tennessee	1	—	—	✓	
Outfielder	Chris Gwynn	San Diego State	2	✓	✓	—	
Outfielder	Shane Mack	UCLA	2	✓	—	✓	
Outfielder	Oddibe McDowell	Arizona State	3	✓	✓	✓	Golden Spikes Award Baseball America Player of the Year Collegiate Baseball Player of the Year
Outfielder	Rafael Palmeiro	Mississippi State	2	✓	✓	—	
Designated hitter	Pete Incaviglia	Oklahoma State	2	✓	✓	—	
Designated hitter	Will Clark	Mississippi State	1	—	—	✓	

== See also ==
- List of college baseball awards
