= Charles Teague =

Charles Teague may refer to:

- Charles M. Teague (1909–1974), American politician
- Charlie Teague (1921–1996), American baseball player
