= Roger Clemens Award =

College baseball award

- Awarded for: Top NCAA Division I college baseball pitcher
- Location: Houston, Texas
- Country: United States
- Presented by: Greater Houston Baseball Association

History
- First award: 2004
- Final award: 2008

The Roger Clemens Award was an award that honored the top NCAA Division I college baseball pitcher of the year. The award was created prior to the 2004 season and succeeded the Rotary Smith Award.

"Roger Clemens has become synonymous with excellence in pitching at the professional level, as evidenced by his six Cy Young Awards. In addition to being a fabulous baseball player at every level in which he has participated, his passion for excellence is unsurpassed. He is mindful of giving back to a sport and a community he loves. With his college and professional resume, his name is most worthy and deserving in recognition of the most outstanding college pitcher. The Roger Clemens Award most certainly will become the college equivalent of the Cy Young, therefore becoming one of the most coveted in college baseball." CBPY Board Member Ray Mitchell (February 14, 2004)

Roger Clemens was an extremely successful college player with the Texas Longhorns before starting his scandal-riddled professional career.

The winner was determined by a vote of all Division I head coaches, selected members of the media, all past winners of the Roger Clemens Award, and all past winners of the Rotary Smith Award. The award was discontinued following the 2008 college baseball season.

Since 2009, the National Pitcher of the Year Award, presented by the College Baseball Foundation, now honors the top NCAA Division I college baseball pitcher of the year.

== Winners ==
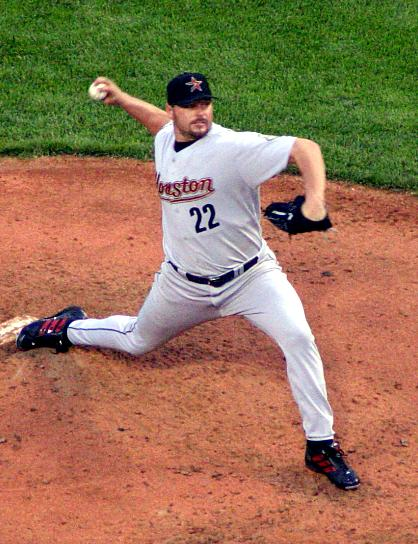
Roger Clemens pitching for the Houston Astros in 2004.

Key
Year	Links to the article about the corresponding baseball year
Player	Name of the player
College	The player's college when he won the award
Italics	Denotes player was the first overall MLB draft pick

Year	Player	College	Ref
2004	Jered Weaver	Long Beach State	
2005	Luke Hochevar	Tennessee	
2006	Andrew Miller	North Carolina	
2007	David Price	Vanderbilt	
2008	Aaron Crow	Missouri	

== See also ==
- List of college baseball awards
