= Chris Roberts (baseball) =

American professional baseball player (born 1971)

- Pitcher
- Born: June 25, 1971 (age 54); Green Cove Springs, Florida, U.S.
- Batted: Right Threw: Left

NPB debut
- April 1, 2000, for the Chiba Lotte Marines

Last NPB appearance
- September 15, 2000, for the Chiba Lotte Marines

NPB statistics
- Win–loss record: 3–5
- Earned run average: 5.64
- Strikeouts: 53
- Stats at Baseball Reference

Teams
- Chiba Lotte Marines (2000)
Medals
Men's baseball
Representing United States
World Junior Baseball Championship
Gold medal – first place	1989 Trois-Rivières	Team
Pan American Games
Bronze medal – third place	1991 Havana	Team

Christopher Eric Roberts (born June 25, 1971) is an American former professional baseball pitcher. He played for the Chiba Lotte Marines of Nippon Professional Baseball (NPB) and for the United States national baseball team.

== Career ==
Roberts attended Middleburg High School in Middleburg, Florida. He competed for the United States national baseball team in the 1989 World Junior Baseball Championships, winning gold. He also appeared in the 1991 Pan American Games, winning the bronze medal with the game-winning hit in the bronze medal game against the Dominican Republic national baseball team. In the tournament, he was named to the All-Tournament Team.

The Philadelphia Phillies selected Roberts in the second round of the 1989 Major League Baseball draft, but he did not sign, opting to attend Florida State University, where he played college baseball for the Florida State Seminoles baseball team in the Atlantic Coast Conference of the National Collegiate Athletic Association's (NCAA) Division I. A two-way player at Florida State, Roberts was named a College Baseball All-American by Collegiate Baseball in 1992. That summer, he competed for the United States in the 1992 Summer Olympics.

The New York Mets drafted Roberts in the first round, with the 18th overall selection, of the 1992 Major League Baseball draft. He played for the Chiba Lotte Marines of the Nippon Professional Baseball (NPB) in 2000. He retired after the 2001 season.

Since 2009, Roberts has served as assistant coach for the Stetson University baseball team, which competes in the Atlantic Sun Conference.
