= Lloyd Simmons =

American baseball coach

Coaching career (HC unless noted)
- 1976–2001, 2012–2016: Seminole State College
- College Baseball Hall of Fame; Inducted in 2019

Lloyd Simmons is an American college baseball coach. He was the head coach for Seminole State College from 1976 to 2001 and from 2012 to 2016. He also served as a manager in Minor League Baseball and a scout. Simmons is a member of the National College Baseball Hall of Fame.

== Early life ==
Simmons was raised on a farm 10 miles (16 km) west of Union City, Oklahoma. He graduated from Union City High School and Central State University (now the University of Central Oklahoma). His career goal was to become a basketball coach.

== Career ==
After he graduated, Simmons became the head basketball coach and assistant baseball coach at Choctaw High School. He spent three years coaching at Elgin High School and one year at Cordell High School.

In 1975, Simmons was hired to become the head baseball coach for Seminole State College, a junior college. He wore uniform number 0 to signify the number of games he expected to lose each season. He declined numerous opportunities from four-year colleges, though he was a candidate to be coach of the Oklahoma Sooners in 1991, when they instead hired Larry Cochell. Simmons won his 1,000th game at Seminole State in 1990 and became the winningest coach in National Junior College Athletic Association (NJCAA). In 1997, Simmons was inducted into the NJCAA Hall of Fame.

In 2001, Simmons announced his retirement from Seminole State. Later that year, the Kansas City Royals of Major League Baseball (MLB) hired Simmons as a manager for their Rookie-level farm teams. He managed the Gulf Coast League Royals in 2001 and the Arizona League Royals for the next six seasons. He had heart surgery in 2007, which caused him to stop managing. Simmons became a scout for the Royals and then for the New York Yankees. He scouted Ty Hensley when the Yankees selected him in the first round of the 2012 MLB draft.

When the head coaching position at Seminole State became open again in 2012, they convinced Simmons to return. He retired after the 2016 season, having won over 1,800 games and leading Seminole State to the JUCO World Series thirteen times, finishing as the runner-up in 1981, 1982, and 1987.

Simmons was inducted into the National College Baseball Hall of Fame in 2019.

== Personal life ==
Simmons married his wife, Carolyn, on June 7, 1963. His brother, Wendell, became the head coach for Central Oklahoma in 1991.
