= Gene Hooks Stadium =

American baseball stadium

- Interactive map of Gene Hooks Stadium
- Former names: Layton Field
- Location: Winston-Salem, North Carolina
- Coordinates: 36°7′54″N 80°16′16″W
- Owner: Wake Forest University
- Capacity: 2,500
- Field size: Left field: 335 feet (102 m); Center field: 400 feet (120 m); Right field: 315 feet (96 m)

Construction
- Opened: March 1981
- Closed: May 2008

Tenant
- Wake Forest Demon Deacons (NCAA) (1981–2008)

Gene Hooks Stadium was a baseball stadium in Winston-Salem, North Carolina. It was the primary home field of the Wake Forest Demon Deacons baseball program from 1981 through 2008.

== History ==
The stadium was in use by March 1981, under its original name of Layton Field, and was dedicated on April 18, 1981. On April 23, 1988, it was renamed after former Wake Forest University athletic director Gene Hooks. Wake Forest's final game at the stadium was a 9–4 win over the Duke Blue Devils on May 11, 2008.

The ballpark was part of a complex sitting north of Faculty Drive (home plate / first base side) and a short distance east of Wingate Road (third base side). There were trees beyond right field, and a small practice golf course beyond left and center field. The ballpark sat less than a mile and almost directly west of BB&T Field and Ernie Shore Field.

For the 2009 season, the team moved back on a full-time basis to their previous home, Ernie Shore Field, which was then renamed Gene Hooks Field at Wake Forest Baseball Park, and later renamed David F. Couch Ballpark.

Gene Hooks Stadium was subsequently demolished to make way for expansion of the golf practice course. The walkway forming the boundary of the southwest portion of the practice course roughly outlines the outer edge of the site of the ballpark's grandstand.
