= Museum at Prairiefire =

Museum in Overland Park, Kansas

- Established: 2014
- Location: 5801 W. 135th Street; Overland Park, Kansas
- Coordinates: 38.8819°N 94.6521°W
- Type: Natural history
- Website: visitthemap.org

The Museum at Prairiefire is a museum in Overland Park, Kansas. The museum is a 42,000 square foot facility that opened in May 2014 and has received honors for its architecture style. The museum carries displays created by other museums, such as American Museum of Natural History. Prairiefire secured a partnership with the American Museum of Natural History and displayed two main traveling exhibits annually that lasted until 2018. When this partnership expired, plans were made to convert the traveling exhibit space into a permanent exhibit named "Kansas Revealed", though this has been repeatedly delayed. In 2024, Prairiefire announced a partnership with the National College Baseball Hall of Fame to open a permanent space at the museum.
