= Hagen Smith =

American baseball player (born 2003)

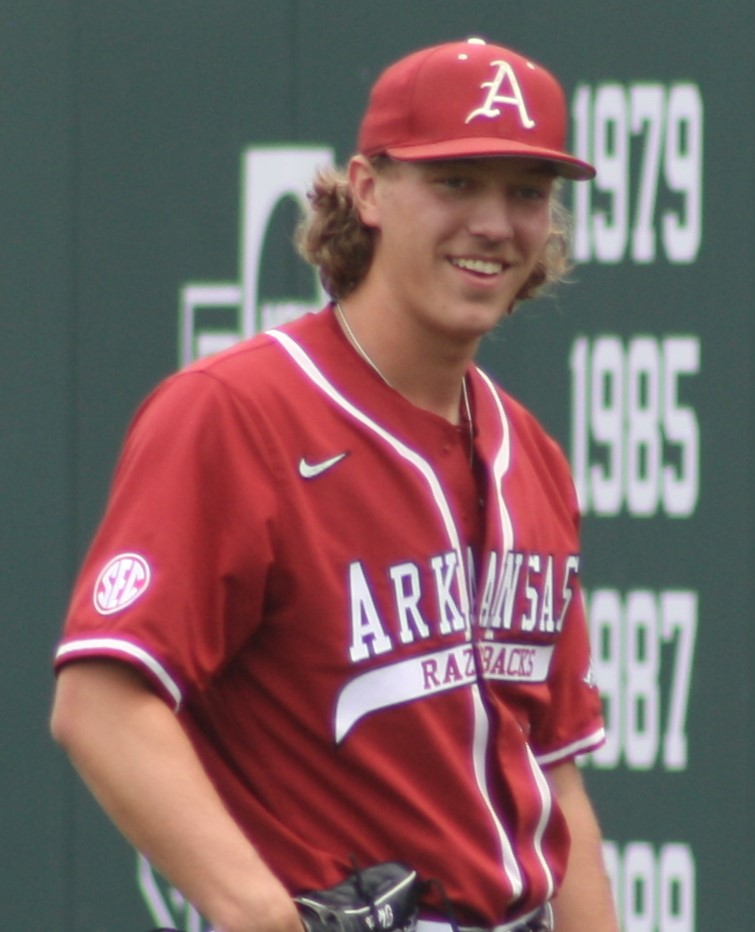
- Smith with Arkansas in 2024

Chicago White Sox – No. 32
- Pitcher
- Born: August 19, 2003 (age 23); Bullard, Texas, U.S.
- Bats: Left Throws: Left

MLB debut
- August 9, 2026, for the Chicago White Sox

MLB statistics (through 2026 season)
- Win–loss record: 3–3
- Earned run average: 1.29
- Strikeouts: 41
- Stats at Baseball Reference

Teams
- Chicago White Sox (2026–present)

Career highlights and awards
- National Pitcher of the Year Award (2024); College Baseball All-America Team (2024)

Hagen Boyd Smith (born August 19, 2003) is an American professional baseball pitcher for the Chicago White Sox of Major League Baseball (MLB). He played college baseball for the Arkansas Razorbacks and was selected by the White Sox in the first round of the 2024 MLB draft.

== Amateur career ==
Smith attended Bullard High School in Bullard, Texas. He underwent Tommy John surgery before his junior year in 2020. As a senior in 2021, he had an 11–0 win–loss record with a 0.19 earned run average (ERA), 168 strikeouts, and seven hits allowed over 73 innings alongside hitting .349. Smith's seven no-hitters during his senior year tied a Texas high school record. He went unselected in the 2021 Major League Baseball draft and enrolled at the University of Arkansas to play college baseball.

As a freshman at Arkansas in 2022, Smith appeared in twenty games (15 starts) and went 7–2 with a 4.66 ERA and 90 strikeouts over 77 1/3 innings. As a sophomore in 2023, he pitched in 18 games (11 starts) and posted an 8–2 record with a 3.64 ERA and 109 strikeouts over 71 2/3 innings and was named a first-team All-American. After the season, he was named to the USA Baseball Collegiate National Team.

On February 23, 2024, Smith struck out 17 batters in a start against Oregon State, matching the Arkansas program record for strikeouts in a game. Smith holds the career strikeouts record at Arkansas (360). He finished the 2024 season with a 9-2 record, 2.04 ERA and 161 strikeouts, including 7–0 with a 1.35 ERA and 110 strikeouts in conference play. Smith was named the SEC Pitcher of the Year and won the National Pitcher of the Year Award.

== Professional career ==
Smith was selected by the Chicago White Sox in the first round with the fifth overall pick of the 2024 Major League Baseball draft. On July 22, 2024, Smith signed with the White Sox on an $8 million contract.

After signing, Smith made his professional debut with the High–A Winston-Salem Dash, giving up three earned runs over 7 2/3 innings. He was assigned to the Double–A Birmingham Barons for the 2025 season. Over 20 starts, Smith went 3–3 with a 3.57 ERA, 108 strikeouts, and 56 walks over 75 2/3 innings. After the season, he was assigned to play in the Arizona Fall League with the Glendale Desert Dogs. Over 14 innings pitched with Glendale, Smith had a 2.57 ERA, 21 strikeouts, and six walks.

Smith was assigned to the Triple–A Charlotte Knights to open the 2026 season and was named the White Sox Minor League Pitcher of the Month for April. In June, he was placed on the injured list with a shoulder impingement. He was activated in July. Smith pitched in 20 games (14 starts) for Charlotte and had a 1–6 record, a 4.32 ERA, and 87 strikeouts across 58 1/3 innings.

On August 8, 2026, Smith was selected to the 40-man roster and promoted to the major leagues for the first time. He made his MLB debut on August 9 against the Cleveland Guardians and pitched two innings in which he gave up no earned runs, four walks, and recorded three strikeouts, with the first of his career being of Brayan Rocchio. He was the winning pitcher as the White Sox won 5–3. Smith played the remainder of the season with the White Sox and pitched mainly as a relief pitcher, while also pitching in one game as an opener, finishing the regular season with a 3–3 record, a 1.29 ERA, and 41 strikeouts over 28 innings. Smith made his MLB postseason debut on September 29 in the 2026 American League Wild Card Series and started Game 1, pitching three scoreless innings in a 6–3 White Sox win. He would finish the postseason starting three games and appearing in a fourth, compiling a 0–0 record, a 1.29 ERA, and six strikeouts over seven innings.
