= Gene Hooks =

American athletic director (1927–2026)

G. Eugene Hooks (May 15, 1927 – April 6, 2026) was an American athletic director at Wake Forest University from 1964 to 1992.

== Playing career ==
Hooks was a third baseman for the Wake Forest Demon Deacons baseball team from 1947 to 1950. Hooks earned first-team All-America honors in 1947 and 1949, and second-team All-American honors in 1950. In 1949, Hooks helped lead the Demon Deacons to the 1949 College World Series, where they lost in the championship game to the Texas Longhorns.

After graduating from Wake Forest in 1950, Hooks initially played for the Decatur Commodores in the Cincinnati Reds organization. However, most of Hooks' professional career was spent in the Chicago Cubs organization, spending time with the Des Moines Bruins, Springfield Cubs, Los Angeles Angels, and Magic Valley Cowboys before retiring after the 1954 season.

== Coaching and athletic director career ==
After receiving his doctorate in education and physical education from George Peabody College, Hooks returned to Wake Forest as the head baseball coach and as a physical education instructor. Hooks coached the baseball team through the 1959 season before returning to the classroom full-time.

In 1964, he became the athletic director at Wake Forest. During his tenure, Wake Forest won three NCAA national championships and 21 Atlantic Coast Conference championships. Upon his retirement in 1992, Hooks went on to serve as the executive director of the Division I-A Athletic Directors Association, a position he held until 1997.

In 1999, Hooks was inducted into the North Carolina Sports Hall of Fame.

Gene Hooks Field at Wake Forest Baseball Park, the Demon Deacons' home stadium, is named in his honor, as was their former home, Gene Hooks Stadium.

== Death ==
Hooks died on April 6, 2026, at the age of 98.
