= Rotary Smith Award =

Award in college baseball

- Awarded for: Most outstanding college baseball player of the year
- Country: United States
- Presented by: Greater Houston Sports Association (1988–2004); Rotary Club of Houston (1996–2004)

History
- First award: 1988
- Final award: 2003

The Rotary Smith Award was created in 1988 to honor the most outstanding college baseball player of the year. The award was founded by the Greater Houston Sports Association. In 1996, the Rotary Club of Houston joined the award committee. Prior to the 2004 season, the award was succeeded by the Roger Clemens Award, honoring the most outstanding college baseball pitcher.

== Winners ==
Key
Year	Links to the article about the corresponding baseball year
Player	Name of the player
Position	The player's position at the time he won the award
College	The player's college when he won the award
Italics	Denotes player was the first overall MLB draft pick in the same year
†	Member of the National College Baseball Hall of Fame

Rotary Smith Award winners
Year	Player	Position	College
1988	Andy Benes	P	Evansville
1989	Ben McDonald^{†}	P	LSU
1990	Mike Kelly	OF	Arizona State
1991	Bobby Jones	P	Fresno State
1992	Mike Smith	OF	Indiana
1993	Darren Dreifort^{†}	P	Wichita State
1994	Jason Varitek	C	Georgia Tech
1995	Mark Kotsay	OF	Cal State Fullerton
1996	Kris Benson	P	Clemson
1997	Tim Hudson	P/OF	Auburn
1998	Brad Wilkerson^{†}	P/OF	Florida
1999	Jason Jennings	P/DH	Baylor
2000	Kip Bouknight	P	South Carolina
2001	Mark Prior	P	Southern California
2002	Khalil Greene	SS	Clemson
2003	Rickie Weeks	2B	Southern University

== See also ==
- List of college baseball awards
