= ABCA National Player of the Year Award =

- Awarded for: Best player in college baseball
- Country: United States
- Presented by: American Baseball Coaches Association

History
- First award: 1988
- Most recent: Daniel Jackson, Georgia and Jackson Flora, UC Santa Barbara
- Website: ABCA/Rawlings Players of the Year

The ABCA National Player of the Year Award is an award given by the American Baseball Coaches Association to the best college baseball player of the year. The award has been given annually since 1988. Since 2018, the ABCA has selected both a pitcher and a position player. Winners are named for NCAA Division I, NCAA Division II, NCAA Division III, the NAIA, junior college, and high school.

== NCAA Division I Winners ==
Key
Year	Links to the article about the corresponding baseball year
Player (X)	Name of the player and number of times they had won the award at that point
Position	The player's position at the time he won the award
School	The player's college when he won the award
Italics	Denotes player was the first overall MLB draft pick in the same year
§	Denotes player also won the Golden Spikes Award or Dick Howser Trophy in the same year
†	Member of the National College Baseball Hall of Fame

Combined Award
Year	Player	Position	School
1988	Robin Ventura^{†}^{§}	3B	Oklahoma State
1989	Scott Bryant^{†}^{§}	UT	Texas
1990	Paul Ellis	C	UCLA
1991	Bobby Jones	P	Fresno State
1992	Brooks Kieschnick^{†}^{§}	UT	Texas
1993	Brooks Kieschnick^{†}^{§}	UT	Texas
1994	Jason Varitek^{†}^{§}	C	Georgia Tech
1995	Todd Helton^{†}	1B/P	Tennessee
1996	Kris Benson^{§}	P	Clemson
1997	J. D. Drew^{†}^{§}	OF	Florida State
1998	Damon Thames	SS	Rice
1999	Jason Jennings^{§}	P	Baylor
2000	Kip Bouknight^{§}	P	South Carolina
2001	Mark Prior^{§}	P	Southern California
2002	Khalil Greene^{§}	SS	Clemson
2003	Rickie Weeks^{†}^{§}	2B	Southern
2004	Jered Weaver^{§}	P	Long Beach State
2005	Alex Gordon^{†}^{§}	3B	Nebraska
2006	Brad Lincoln^{§}	P	Houston
2007	David Price^{§}	P	Vanderbilt
2008	Buster Posey^{§}	C	Florida State
2009	Mike Leake	P	Arizona State
2010	Anthony Rendon^{§}	3B	Rice
2011	Trevor Bauer^{§}	P	UCLA
2012	Travis Jankowski	OF	Stony Brook
2012	James Ramsey	OF	Florida State
2013	Kris Bryant^{§}	3B	San Diego
2014	A. J. Reed^{§}	1B/P	Kentucky
2015	Dansby Swanson	SS	Vanderbilt
2016	Kyle Lewis^{§}	OF	Mercer
2017	Brendan McKay^{§}	1B/P	Louisville

Position Player of the Year
Year	Player	Position	School
2018	Kody Clemens	2B	Texas
2018	Andrew Vaughn^{§}	1B	California
2019	Adley Rutschman^{§}	C	Oregon State
2020	Not awarded (Note: Due to the COVID-19 pandemic)	—	—
2021	Tanner Allen	OF	Mississippi State
2022	Ivan Melendez^{§}	1B	Texas
2023	Jac Caglianone	UT	Florida
2024	Jac Caglianone	UT	Florida
2025	Roch Cholowsky	SS	UCLA
2026	Daniel Jackson^{§}	C	Georgia

Pitcher of the Year
Year	Player	Position	School
2018	Brady Singer^{§}	P	Florida
2019	Ethan Small	P	Mississippi State
2020	Not awarded (Note: Due to the COVID-19 pandemic)	—	—
2021	Kevin Kopps^{§}	P	Arkansas
2022	Cooper Hjerpe	P	Oregon State
2023	Paul Skenes^{§}	P	LSU
2024	Hagen Smith	P	Arkansas
2025	Jacob Morrison	P	Coastal Carolina
2026	Jackson Flora	P	UC Santa Barbara

== See also ==
- List of college baseball awards
- College Baseball Hall of Fame
