= Mike Schmidt =

American baseball player (born 1949)

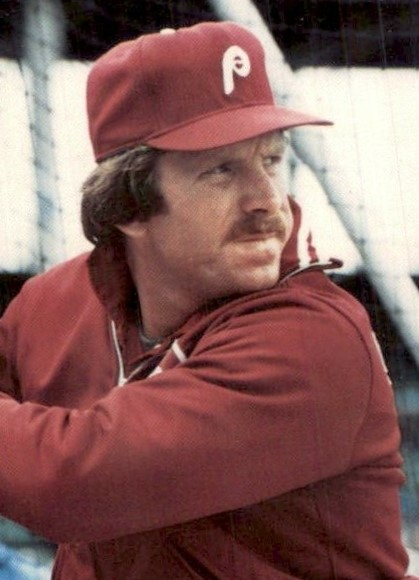
- Schmidt with the Philadelphia Phillies in 1982
- Third baseman
- Born: September 27, 1949 (age 77); Dayton, Ohio, U.S.
- Batted: Right Threw: Right

MLB debut
- September 12, 1972, for the Philadelphia Phillies

Last MLB appearance
- May 28, 1989, for the Philadelphia Phillies

MLB statistics
- Batting average: .267
- Hits: 2,234
- Home runs: 548
- Runs batted in: 1,595
- Stats at Baseball Reference

Teams
- Philadelphia Phillies (1972–1989)

Career highlights and awards
- 12× All-Star (1974, 1976, 1977, 1979–1984, 1986, 1987, 1989); World Series champion (1980); 3× NL MVP (1980, 1981, 1986); World Series MVP (1980); 10× Gold Glove Award (1976–1984, 1986); 6× Silver Slugger Award (1980–1984, 1986); 8× NL home run leader (1974–1976, 1980, 1981, 1983, 1984, 1986); 4× NL RBI leader (1980, 1981, 1984, 1986); Hit four home runs in one game on April 17, 1976; Philadelphia Phillies No. 20 retired; Philadelphia Phillies Wall of Fame; Major League Baseball All-Century Team; Major League Baseball All-Time Team

Member of the National

Baseball Hall of Fame
- Induction: 1995
- Vote: 96.5% (first ballot)

Michael Jack Schmidt (born September 27, 1949) is an American former professional baseball third baseman who spent his entire 18-year Major League Baseball (MLB) career with the Philadelphia Phillies from 1972 to 1989. Schmidt was a 12-time All-Star and a three-time winner of the National League (NL) Most Valuable Player award (MVP), and he was known for his combination of power hitting and strong defense. As a hitter, he compiled 548 home runs and 1,595 runs batted in (RBIs), and led the NL in home runs eight times and in RBIs four times. As a fielder, Schmidt won the National League Gold Glove Award for third basemen ten times. Schmidt was elected to the Baseball Hall of Fame in 1995 in his first year of eligibility, and is widely considered to be one of the greatest third basemen in baseball history.

Having an unusual batting stance, Schmidt turned his back somewhat toward the pitcher and rocked his rear end back and forth while waiting for a pitch. By standing far back in the batter's box, he made it almost impossible to jam him by pitching inside.

Teammate Pete Rose once said, "To have his body, I'd trade him mine and my wife's, and I'd throw in some cash."

== Early life ==
Schmidt's parents were Joseph Jack Schmidt (1926–2011) and Lois Jane Philipps (1926–2019). They managed the Philipps Aquatic Club founded by Lois's great-grandfather Charles A. Philipps in 1865. Schmidt was a lifeguard at the club.

At age 5, Schmidt climbed a tree and was electrocuted when he touched a wire; his heart stopped and he fell, causing his heart to restart. He survived with minimal burn marks.

Schmidt was a standout athlete in both Little League Baseball and in three sports at Fairview High School in Dayton, Ohio, from which he graduated in 1967. However, knee surgeries ended his participation in basketball and football. He then attended Ohio University in Athens, where he joined the Beta Theta Pi fraternity.

== Baseball career ==
=== Amateur career ===
At Ohio University, Schmidt led the Ohio Bobcats baseball team to the College World Series in 1970 and was selected as the shortstop for the 1970 College Baseball All-America Team. Schmidt was drafted by the Phillies in the second round of the 1971 Major League Baseball draft, 30th overall.

=== Minor Leagues ===
On June 11, 1971, Schmidt was signed by Phillies scout Tony Lucadello, who had followed him since high school. Six days later, Schmidt made his professional debut in an exhibition game between the Phillies and their Double-A affiliate the Reading Phillies in Reading, Pennsylvania. Schmidt played the whole game at shortstop for the Phillies, hitting a game-winning home run against his future Reading teammates. Schmidt stayed in Reading, spending the rest of the 1971 season at the Double-A level. In 1972, he was promoted to the Triple-A Eugene Emeralds of the Pacific Coast League. Along with shortstop and third base, Schmidt also played at second base during his time in the minor leagues.

=== Major Leagues ===
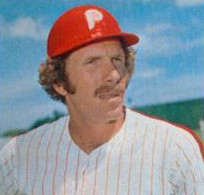
Schmidt with the Phillies in 1977

==== 1972–1979 ====
Schmidt spent two seasons in the Phillies' farm system, where he batted .263 with 34 home runs and 122 runs batted in. After playing most of the 1972 season for Triple-A Eugene, he was called up to the Phillies in September and made his major league debut against the New York Mets on September 12. Four days later, in Philadelphia on September 16, Schmidt ended Montreal Expos pitcher Balor Moore's streak of 25 scoreless innings pitched with his first career home run.

Following the 1972 season, the Phillies dealt third baseman Don Money to the Milwaukee Brewers to open a spot for Schmidt in their infield. While he batted only .196 with 136 strikeouts during his first full season in 1973, Schmidt demonstrated his power potential by hitting 18 home runs.

Schmidt had a breakout season in 1974, increasing his batting average to .282 and playing in the first of his twelve Major League Baseball All-Star Games. On June 10, in the Astrodome in Houston, Texas, Schmidt hit a ball off Houston Astros' pitcher Claude Osteen that looked like a sure home run. The ball hit a public address speaker suspended 117 feet above and 329 feet away from home plate, falling into center field. By the ground rules, it remained in play and Schmidt was held to just a single, with the runners on first and second each advancing just one base. It is believed that had the ball not hit the speaker, it would have traveled beyond 500 feet. For the season, Schmidt finished sixth in National League Most Valuable Player balloting as he batted .282 with 116 RBIs and a league-leading 36 home runs to help the Phillies avoid a last-place finish in the National League East for the first time since 1970. His 404 assists in 1974 remains a record for NL third basemen.

Schmidt's batting average hovered below .200 through May 1975. After solid performance in July and August, his average rose to .249 by the end of the season as he led the league in home runs for the second year in a row, with 38. Schmidt started the 1976 season by hitting 12 home runs in Philadelphia's first 15 games, including four in one game on April 17, placing him on the list of Major League Baseball single-game home run leaders and becoming the 10th player in major league history to accomplish that feat. For the season, Schmidt drove in 107 runs, led the league in home runs for the third year in a row (38), and won his first of ten Gold Gloves to lead the Phillies to their first division crown since division play started in 1969.

In 1977, Schmidt signed a contract with the Phillies that paid him $561,500 per year (equivalent to $2,980,000 in 2025), making him the highest-paid player in baseball history to that point and the first to surpass $500,000 annually.

The Phillies captured the NL East crown three years in a row; however, they were swept by Cincinnati's "Big Red Machine" in 1976, and lost to the Los Angeles Dodgers in 1977 and 1978. On December 5, 1978, the Phillies signed Pete Rose as a free agent, temporarily making Rose the highest-paid athlete in team sports with a four-year, $3.2 million contract. With Rose on board, the Phillies were early favorites to repeat as division winners in 1979. Instead, the Phillies finished the season at 84–78, in fourth place in NL East. For his part, Schmidt broke the club record for home runs in a season with 45, eclipsing Chuck Klein's 43 homers in 1929.

==== 1980–1986 ====
On October 3, 1980, the Phillies played against Montreal, tied with the Expos for first place in the NL East. With a sacrifice fly in the first, and a solo home run in the sixth, Schmidt led the Phillies to a 2–1 victory to capture first place. A day later, Schmidt hit his 48th home run of the season in the 11th inning to give the Phillies the 6–4 extra innings victory over the Expos, and clinch the division. His career high 48 home runs broke his own team record, and led the National League by a margin of 13 over his nearest competitor. Coupled with a league-leading 121 RBIs (also his career best), his home runs made Schmidt a unanimous choice for the National League's Most Valuable Player Award.

The Phillies defeated the Houston Astros in the 1980 National League Championship Series to reach the World Series for the third time in franchise history. Though Schmidt had just a career .191 post-season batting average with no home runs and five RBIs, his bat came alive in the 1980 World Series, hitting two homers and driving in seven runs against the Kansas City Royals. The Phillies beat the Royals in six games to win the first World Series in franchise history, and Schmidt won the World Series MVP Award. Following the World Series, Schmidt and four of his Phillies teammates appeared on Family Feud for one week in 1980. He, Larry Bowa, Garry Maddox, Dick Ruthven and Del Unser took on five members of the Kansas City Royals: Dennis Leonard, Dan Quisenberry, Paul Splittorff, John Wathan and Willie Wilson.

Schmidt's best season may have been the strike-shortened 1981 season. His 31 home runs were seven more than anyone else in the league. He also led the NL in runs scored, RBIs, total bases and walks, and set personal highs in batting average, on-base percentage and slugging percentage. He won his second consecutive MVP award, this time with 96% of the vote.

The Phillies led the NL East by 1.5 games when the 1981 Major League Baseball strike hit. As a result, the Phillies were named NL East champions for the first half of the season; however, they lost to the second-half champion Montreal Expos in the 1981 National League Division Series.

In 1983, in celebration of the team's 100th anniversary, Schmidt was voted by fans the greatest player in the history of the franchise. That year, he led the league in home runs for the sixth time in his career to lead the Phillies back to the postseason. Schmidt led his team with a .467 batting average and scored five runs as they defeated the Los Angeles Dodgers in the 1983 National League Championship Series. It was, however, a much different story against the Baltimore Orioles in the 1983 World Series. The Phillies were held to a .195 team batting average; Schmidt went just 1-for-20 with a single.

Following the 1983 season, Schmidt was awarded the Lou Gehrig Memorial Award. That off-season, Pete Rose left the Phillies as a free agent and signed with the Montreal Expos. With a hole at first base, the Phillies played Tim Corcoran and Len Matuszek in a platoon system during the 1984 season. Neither player provided the offensive spark Rose did, and so a change was in order. Early in the 1985 season, Schmidt agreed to move to first base (starting from late May) through the end of the season with Rick Schu assuming third base duties. The Phillies finished with a record below .500 for the first time since 1974.

In 1986, the Phillies moved outfielder Von Hayes to first base and shifted Schmidt back to third base. He responded by winning his third MVP award, a record for third basemen, with a league-leading 37 home runs and 119 RBIs. As of 2025, Schmidt is the most recent player to have led his league in RBIs four times.

==== 1987–1989 ====
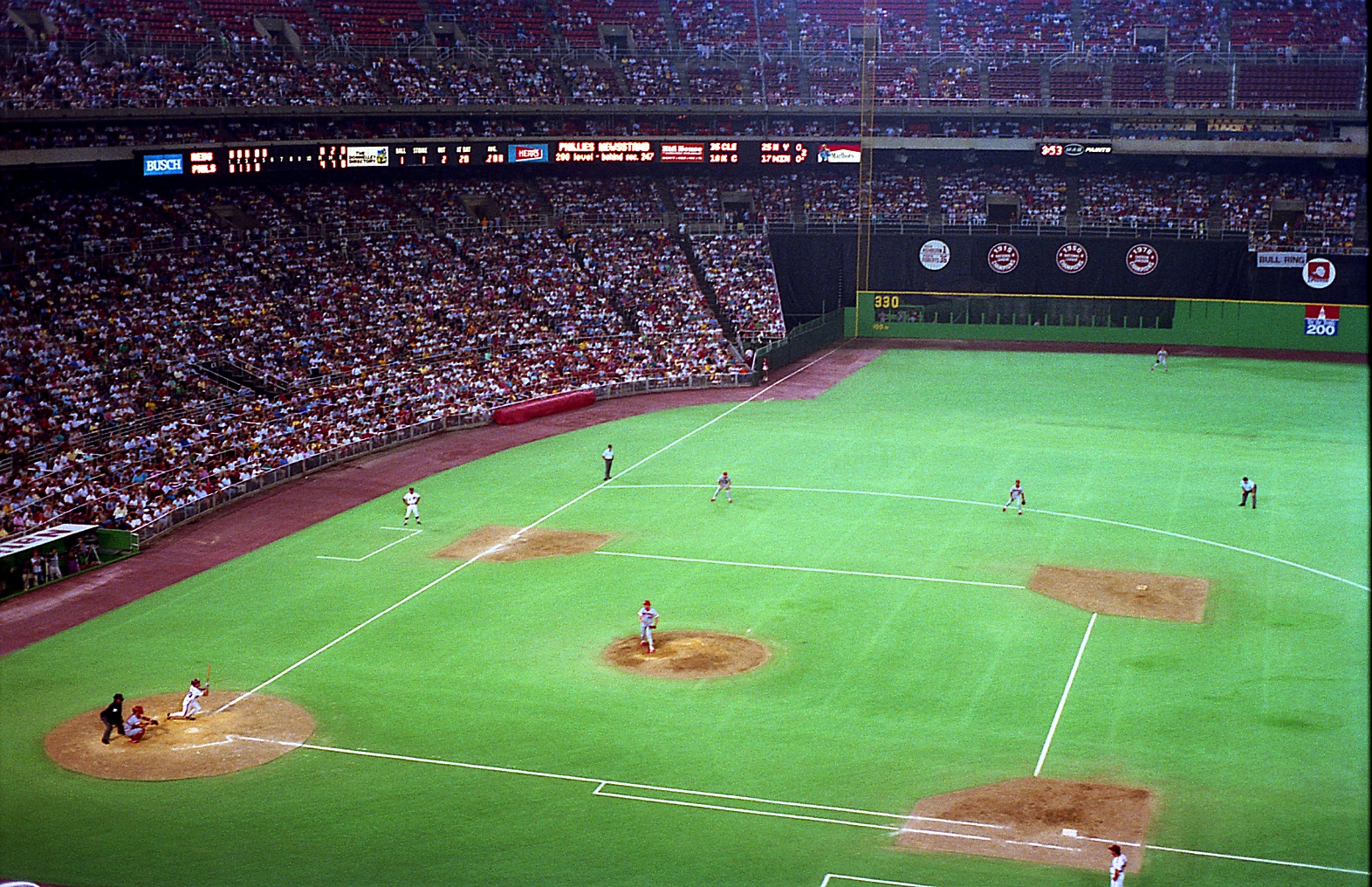
Schmidt homers against the Cincinnati Reds at Veterans Stadium on July 20, 1987

Trailing the Pittsburgh Pirates 6–5 in the top of the ninth inning at Three Rivers Stadium on April 18, 1987, Schmidt became a member of the 500 home run club, hitting a three-run shot off of Don Robinson. It put the Phillies ahead 8–6, and ended up being the game-winner.

Injuries to Schmidt's rotator cuff caused him to miss the last month and a half of the 1988 season. He returned healthy for the 1989 season. However, after a poor start, Schmidt suddenly chose to announce his retirement in San Diego, on May 29. Although he typically demonstrated little emotion on the field, and was known as "Captain Cool" by many in Philadelphia sports circles, Schmidt surprised many with an emotional, and occasionally tearful, retirement speech. He said in his retirement press conference,

"Some 18 years ago, I left Dayton, Ohio, with two very bad knees and a dream of becoming a major-league baseball player; I thank God this dream came true."

His last game was May 28, 1989, against the San Francisco Giants.

Despite his own perceived subpar start and subsequent retirement on May 29, fans once again voted Schmidt to be the starting third baseman for the NL All-Star team. He decided not to play, but he did participate in the opening ceremony of the All-Star Game in uniform.

== Career statistics ==
Games	PA	AB	Runs	Hits	2B	3B	HR	RBI	SB	BB	SO	Avg.	OBP	Slg.	OPS	Fld%
2,404	10,062	8,352	1,506	2,234	408	59	548	1,595	174	1,507	1,883	.267	.380	.527	.908	.961

Over his career, Schmidt set a vast array of hitting and fielding records. In addition to his MVP Awards, Schmidt won ten Gold Gloves, led the league in home runs eight times, in RBIs four times, OPS five times, and walks four times. He was named to 12 All-Star teams. He is the Phillies' all-time leader in games played, at-bats, plate appearances, runs scored, home runs, RBI, walks, strikeouts, total bases, runs created, sacrifice flies, outs, Adj. Batting Runs, Adj. Batting Wins, Extra Base Hits, Times On Base, and Power-Speed number. Schmidt's 548 home runs are the most ever hit by a player who spent his entire career with just one team.

Schmidt is one of only three players (along with Willie Mays and Ken Griffey Jr.) to win 10 Gold Gloves and hit at least 500 home runs, and is the only infielder ever to do so.

== Post-playing career and accolades ==
Mike Schmidt's number 20 was retired by the Philadelphia Phillies in 1990.

In 1990, Schmidt was named "The Player of the Decade" of the 1980s by The Sporting News.

His uniform number 20 was retired by the Phillies before a game at Veterans Stadium on May 26, 1990. That same season, Schmidt was inducted as a member of the Philadelphia Baseball Wall of Fame. He had previously been inducted as the third baseman for the Phillies' Centennial Team in 1983.

In 1991, he and Nolan Ryan were inducted into the Peter J. McGovern Little League Museum's Hall of Excellence, established in 1988, thereby becoming only the second and third MLB players inducted into the Hall.

In 1995, on his first ballot, Schmidt was elected to the National Baseball Hall of Fame and Museum with what was at the time the fourth highest voting percentage ever, 96.52%.

In 1997, Schmidt was elected as the starting third-baseman by the Baseball Writers' Association of America to the Major League Baseball All-Time Team. The event was celebrated at the 1997 Major League Baseball All-Star Game in Cleveland, Ohio.

In 1999, he ranked number 28 on The Sporting News's list of the 100 Greatest Baseball Players, the highest-ranking third baseman, and the highest-ranking player whose career began after 1967.

Also in 1999, he was elected to the Major League Baseball All-Century Team as the starting third-baseman. The event was celebrated at the 1999 Major League Baseball All-Star Game in Boston, Massachusetts.

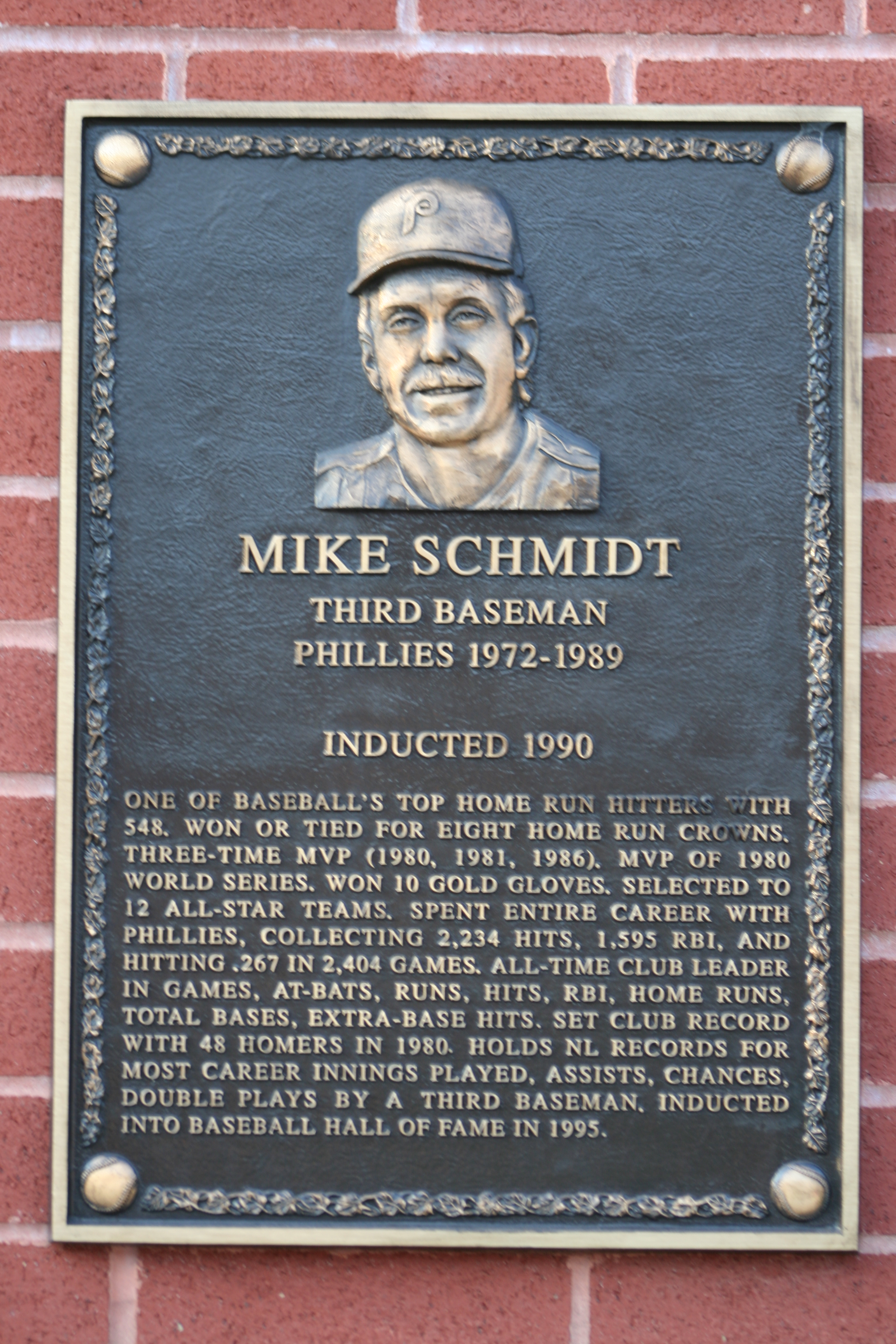
Schmidt's plaque on the Philadelphia Baseball Wall of Fame at Citizens Bank Park

Schmidt was honored with a statue outside the third-base gate at Citizens Bank Park in 2004.

On September 27, 2006, Schmidt was announced as the Phillies representative for the DHL Hometown Heroes promotion, beating out Steve Carlton, Richie Ashburn, Robin Roberts and Chuck Klein as most outstanding player in Phillies history.

In October 2014 the Ohio University Bobcats retired his number 10. Schmidt led the Bobcats to the College World Series in 1970.

In 2015, Schmidt was named one of the Phillies "Franchise Four" as voted by the fans, along with Steve Carlton, Richie Ashburn and Robin Roberts.

Schmidt was a vocal advocate for the reinstatement of Pete Rose to baseball.

In July 2005, on Bob Costas's HBO show Costas Now Schmidt said, "if I had played during that era, I would have taken steroids". In his 2006 book, Clearing the Bases: Juiced Players, Monster Salaries, Sham Records, and a Hall of Famer's Search for the Soul of Baseball, he somewhat recanted that statement, saying that he understood the desire to get a competitive advantage even though he could not condone breaking the rules to do so.

=== Coaching ===
Starting in 2002, Schmidt worked with the Phillies as a hitting coach during each Spring training. In October 2003, Schmidt was named the manager of the Phillies' Single A Florida State League affiliate, the Clearwater Threshers. He managed them for just the 2004 season, then resigned. In 2009, he served as third base coach for Team USA in the World Baseball Classic.

=== Broadcasting ===
NBC used Schmidt as a guest analyst for Game 1 of the 1989 NLCS. Schmidt subsequently, did on-field reporting throughout the series. Schmidt also provided periodic commentary (albeit, taped prior to the playoffs) for ABC during the 1988 NLCS.

Schmidt spent the 1990 season as a color analyst with the Phillies broadcast team on the PRISM channel, where he was partnered with play-by-play announcer Jim Barniak. He was known to be very candid and honest with his commentary, but left the booth after just one season. Schmidt returned to broadcasting as a color analyst for The Baseball Network during its two seasons of existence in 1994 and 1995. Starting in 2014, he provided commentary during Phillies Sunday home games on NBC Sports Philadelphia. In 2015, Schmidt also provided commentary during Saturday home games, creating a "Weekends with Schmidt" format that continued through 2018. Schmidt returned exclusively to home Sunday games in 2019, though he will occasionally provide commentary on a Saturday if the Phillies have a nationally televised Sunday home game.

== Personal life ==
In February 1974, Schmidt married Donna Wightman; they had two children. In 1979, they bought a 12,000 square foot home in Upper Providence Township, Delaware County, Pennsylvania for $490,000. In 1991, they bought an 8,500 square foot house in the Admiral’s Cove golf community in Jupiter, Florida for $425,000.

In 2014, Schmidt disclosed that he had stage-3 melanoma in the summer of 2013, but that he was now cancer-free. In conjunction with the Richard David Kann Melanoma Foundation, the City of Philadelphia, and Independence Blue Cross, the Phillies placed 12 sunblock dispensers around Citizens Bank Park in May 2017.

=== Philanthropy ===
In 2001, Schmidt began sponsoring an annual fishing tournament in Grand Bahama Island. It has raised a total of over $2.5 million for charities including the Cystic Fibrosis Foundation, American Cancer Society, and Cleveland Clinic.

In 2008, Schmidt released a wine called Mike Schmidt 548 Zinfandel, a reference to his 548 career home runs, with proceeds also going to the Cystic Fibrosis Foundation.

He also regularly participates in charity golf tournaments.

== See also ==
- List of Major League Baseball home run records
- List of Major League Baseball career home run leaders
- 500 home run club
- List of Major League Baseball career hits leaders
- List of Major League Baseball career doubles leaders
- List of Major League Baseball career extra base hits leaders
- List of Major League Baseball career games played leaders
- List of Major League Baseball career games played as a third baseman leaders
- List of Major League Baseball career intentional bases on balls leaders
- List of Major League Baseball career runs scored leaders
- List of Major League Baseball career runs batted in leaders
- List of Major League Baseball annual runs batted in leaders
- List of Major League Baseball annual home run leaders
- List of Major League Baseball annual runs scored leaders
- List of Major League Baseball career plate appearance leaders
- List of Major League Baseball career strikeouts by batters leaders
- List of Major League Baseball career times on base leaders
- List of Major League Baseball career total bases leaders
- List of Major League Baseball players who spent their entire career with one franchise
- List of Major League Baseball single-game home run leaders
- Major League Baseball titles leaders
- DHL Hometown Heroes

Achievements
Preceded by Willie Mays	Batters with 4 home runs in one game April 17, 1976	Succeeded by Bob Horner
