= National Pitcher of the Year Award =

College baseball award

- Awarded for: Best pitcher in college baseball
- Country: United States
- Presented by: College Baseball Foundation

History
- First award: 2009
- Most recent: Jackson Flora, UC Santa Barbara
- Website: National Pitcher of the Year Award

The National Pitcher of the Year Award is a college baseball award given to the best pitcher of the college baseball season by the College Baseball Foundation. The current holder of the award is Jackson Flora of the UC Santa Barbara

== Winners ==
Key
‡	Player also won the Golden Spikes Award and/or Dick Howser Trophy in the same year

Year	Winner	School	Ref
2009	Stephen Strasburg^{‡}	San Diego State	
2010	Alex Wimmers	Ohio State	
2011	Trevor Bauer^{‡}	UCLA	
2012	Mark Appel	Stanford	
2013	Jon Gray	Oklahoma	
2014	Aaron Nola	LSU	
2015	Carson Fulmer	Vanderbilt	
2016	Eric Lauer	Kent State	
2017	Steven Gingery	Texas Tech	
2018	Luke Heimlich	Oregon State	
2019	Ethan Small	Mississippi State	
2020	Not awarded (Note: Due to the COVID-19 pandemic)		
2021	Kevin Kopps^{‡}	Arkansas	
2022	Cooper Hjerpe	Oregon State	
2023	Paul Skenes^{‡}	LSU	
2024	Hagen Smith	Arkansas	
2025	Jake Knapp	North Carolina	
2026	Jackson Flora	UC Santa Barbara	

== See also ==
- List of college baseball awards
- Baseball awards § U.S. college baseball
- College Baseball Hall of Fame
