= Kip Bouknight =

American baseball player (born 1978)

- Pitcher
- Born: November 16, 1978 (age 47); Columbia, South Carolina, U.S.
- Bats: Right Throws: Right
- Stats at Baseball Reference

Career highlights and awards
- Golden Spikes Award (2000)

Kip McKey Bouknight (born November 16, 1978) is an American professional baseball pitcher.

== High school career ==
Bouknight was born in Columbia, South Carolina and graduated from Brookland-Cayce High School in 1997. He was selected as an All-Star by the South Carolina Baseball Coaches Association in his senior year. During a playoff match-up against Union High School that year, he threw a no-hitter. In 1995, his sophomore year, he was named as an honorable mention from South Carolina in the All-USA High School award.

== College career ==
Bouknight was a four-year starting pitcher at the University of South Carolina and set career records at the university in innings pitched (482.0), strikeouts (457), games won (45) and games started (57). He finished with a 45-12 career record. With his 45 wins, Bouknight is tied with Jeff Brantley for the all-time SEC record.

Bouknight finished the 1998 season with a record of 6-1 and a 2.21 ERA. In that season, he earned first-team All-SEC, SEC All-Freshman Team and Freshman All-American honors. In honor of his break-out season, the University baseball team awards the Kip Bouknight Award to the best freshman pitcher each season. After the 1999 season, he played collegiate summer baseball with the Chatham A's of the Cape Cod Baseball League.

As a junior in 2000, he earned the most wins of any collegiate pitcher with 17 that year, only lost one game, and posted a 2.81 ERA. He was named a consensus All-American. He was named to the first-team All-SEC team, SEC Pitcher of the Year and SEC Male Athlete of the Year.

Bouknight also won several national Player of the Year honors in 2000 including the Golden Spikes Award as the nation's top amateur player and the Rotary Smith Award as the most outstanding collegiate pitcher.

In 2007, he was inducted into the University of South Carolina Athletic Hall of Fame.

== Professional career ==
Bouknight was drafted by the Oakland A's in 2000 but opted to remain in college for another year. The following year, he was selected by the Colorado Rockies in the 13th round of the amateur draft. He remained in the Rockies organization through 2004. That year he also spent time in Toronto Blue Jays system. Bouknight spent most of 2005 and 2006 with the Harrisburg Senators, the Nationals' AA affiliate in the Eastern League, and had brief stints with the AAA New Orleans Zephyrs of the Pacific Coast League. He began the 2007 season with the Pirates affiliate, the AA Altoona Curve and was promoted to the AAA Indianapolis Indians in late June. Kip Bouknight pitched 16 games for the AA Reading Phillies in 2008 until being released by the Phillies on July 3, 2008.

=== Career achievements ===
- In the 2006 Eastern League All-Star game, Bouknight was the winning pitcher for the South division after 3 shut-out innings of relief.
- On August 8, 2001, Bouknight threw a combined perfect game for the Class-A Tri-City Dust Devils. Bouknight pitched the first six innings and Pat Lynch finished the game, completing the first 9 inning perfect game in Northwest League history.
- On August 7, 2002, Bouknight threw a no-hitter for the High Class-A Salem Avalanche.
