= Murray Wall (baseball) =

American baseball player (1926–1971)

- Pitcher
- Born: September 19, 1926; Dallas, Texas, U.S.
- Died: October 8, 1971 (aged 45); Lone Oak, Texas, U.S.
- Batted: Right Threw: Right

MLB debut
- July 4, 1950, for the Boston Braves

Last MLB appearance
- July 25, 1959, for the Boston Red Sox

MLB statistics
- Win–loss record: 13–14
- Earned run average: 4.20
- Innings: 193
- Stats at Baseball Reference

Teams
- Boston Braves (1950); Boston Red Sox (1957–1959); Washington Senators (1959)

Murray Wesley Wall (September 19, 1926 – October 8, 1971) was an American middle relief pitcher in Major League Baseball who played between the 1950 and 1959 seasons for the Boston Braves (1950), Boston Red Sox (1957–59) and Washington Senators (1959).

== Biography ==
Wall was born to Mary Mae Havens and George Wesley Wall on September 19, 1926 in Dallas Texas.

Wall was listed as being 6 feet 3 inches (1.91 m) and 185 pounds (84 kg). He batted and threw right-handed.

A native of Dallas, he was signed by the Braves in 1950 as a free agent out of the University of Texas at Austin.

In a four-season career, Murray posted a 13–14 record with a 4.20 ERA and 13 saves in 91 appearances (one start), including 82 strikeouts, 63 walks, and 193.0 innings pitched. In his last MLB season, 1959, Wall was traded by Boston to the Washington Senators on June 11 in a four-player deal that included Senator pitcher Dick Hyde. He appeared in one game for Washington before being returned to the Red Sox on June 14 when Hyde's sore arm voided the Wall-for-Hyde portion of the transaction.

At the age of 45, Murray committed suicide via gunshot at his farm near Lone Oak, Texas.
