= Charlie Teague =

American baseball player

Charles Clyde Teague (November 5, 1921, Guilford County, North Carolina – May 8, 1996, Greensboro, North Carolina) was an American professional baseball player. A second baseman, he played in minor league baseball. As a college baseball player for Wake Forest University, he was named an All-American in three seasons. In 2010, he was inducted into the National College Baseball Hall of Fame.

== Career ==
Teague attended Eugene High School. He was named captain of his school's baseball team in a vote amongst the players.

Teague attended Wake Forest University from 1947 through 1950, playing college baseball for the Wake Forest Demon Deacons baseball team. He was the first Demon Deacon to be named an All-American in baseball, receiving the honor three times.

The Chicago Cubs signed Teague in 1950 and assigned him to begin his professional career in minor league baseball with the Des Moines Bruins of the Western League.

Teague was posthumously elected to the National College Baseball Hall of Fame in 2010.
