= College Baseball Foundation =

US non-profit organization

- College Baseball Foundation logo

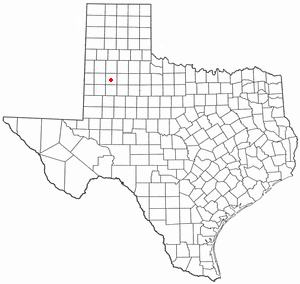
- Location in the state of Texas
- Abbreviation: CBF
- Formation: 2004
- Type: NPO
- Location: Lubbock, Texas
- President and CEO: Mike Gustafson
- Website: collegebaseballhall.org

The College Baseball Foundation was formed in 2004 in Lubbock, Texas as a non-profit organization, with the dual aims of awarding the Brooks Wallace Award, and creating the National College Baseball Hall of Fame. The organization also annually presents several other college baseball awards including: the John Olerud Award, National Collegiate Umpire Award, Pitcher of the Year Award, and Skip Bertman Award.

== National College Baseball Hall of Fame ==
The National College Baseball Hall of Fame was created in 2004 by the College Baseball Foundation, and inducted its first class in 2006. The yet-to-be built facility will be named after President George H. W. Bush who captained the Yale Bulldogs baseball team, and as a left-handed first baseman, played in the first two College World Series. As of January 2013, the Foundation had raised approximately $7 million of the $13 million goal, after receiving a $5 million grant from the Moody Foundation.

== Awards ==
=== Brooks Wallace Award ===
Named after former Texas Tech Red Raiders shortstop and assistant coach Brooks Wallace, since 2009, this award is given annually to the best collegiate shortstop. From 2004 to 2008, the award was given to the most outstanding player.

=== John Olerud Award ===
Named after former Washington State Cougars pitcher and first baseman John Olerud, since 2010, this award is given annually to the best collegiate two-way player.

=== Pitcher of the Year Award ===
Since 2009, this award is given annually to the best collegiate pitcher. From 2004 to 2008, the Roger Clemens Award, was given to the best collegiate pitcher by the Greater Houston Baseball Association.

=== Stopper of the Year Award ===
This award is presented to the best collegiate relief pitcher, by the NCBWA.

=== Skip Bertman Award ===
Named after former LSU Tigers head coach Skip Bertman, since 2013, this award is given annually to the best collegiate head coach. The inaugural award was given to head coach Mike Dickson at Gloucester County College, a Division III member of the National Junior College Athletic Association (NJCAA).

Skip Bertman Award winners
Season	Coach	Team	Ref
2013	Mike Dickson	Gloucester County College	
2014	Tim Tadlock	Texas Tech	
2015	Paul Mainieri	LSU	
2016	Tim Scannell	Trinity	
2017	Kevin O'Sullivan	Florida	
2018	Jeff Willis	LSU Eunice	
2019	Erik Bakich	Michigan	
2020	Not awarded		
2021	Jeremy Sheetinger	Georgia Gwinnett College	
2022	Brian Hamm	Yale	
2023	Kevin Brooks	Angelo State	
2024	Jeff Willis	LSU-Eunice	
2025	Brad Neffendorf	LSU-Shreveport	

=== National Collegiate Umpire Award ===
This award is presented to a collegiate umpire.
2012—Rich Fetchiet
2013—Dale Williams (Pac-8/Pac-10)
2014—Hank Rountree
2015—John Magnusson (SEC)
2019—Jon Bible

=== George H.W. Bush Distinguished Alumnus Award ===
This award is presented to a college-athlete alumnus.

== See also ==
- List of college baseball awards
- Baseball awards § U.S. college baseball
