= The Sporting News College Baseball Player of the Year Award =

- Awarded for: Best player in college baseball
- Country: United States
- Presented by: The Sporting News

History
- First award: 1964
- Final award: 2001

The Sporting News College Baseball Player of the Year Award was an award given by The Sporting News to the best college baseball player of the year. The award was given annually from 1964 to 1990, and then sporadically after that until 2001.

== Winners ==
Key
Year	Links to the article about the corresponding baseball year
Player (X)	Name of the player and number of times they had won the award at that point
Position	The player's position at the time he won the award
School	The player's college when he won the award
	Member of the National College Baseball Hall of Fame

Year	Player	Position	School	Ref
1964	Rick Reichardt	OF	Wisconsin	
1965	Rick Monday	OF	Arizona State	
1966	Reggie Jackson	OF	Arizona State	
1967	Gary Gentry	P	Arizona State	
1968	Dave Lemonds	P	North Carolina	
1969	Paul Powell	OF	Arizona State	
1970	Steve Dunning	P	Stanford	
1971	Rob Ellis	OF	Michigan State	
1972	Dave Roberts	3B	Oregon	
1973	Eddie Bane	P	Arizona State	
1974	Bill Almon	SS	Brown	
1975	Danny Goodwin	C	Southern	
1976	Floyd Bannister	P	Arizona State	
1977	Terry Kennedy	C	Florida State	
1978	Bob Horner	2B	Arizona State	
1979	Tim Wallach	1B	Cal State Fullerton	
1980	Terry Francona	OF	Arizona	
1981	Joe Carter	OF	Wichita State	
1982	Jeff Ledbetter	OF	Florida State	
1983	Robbie Wine	C	Oklahoma State	
1984	Mark McGwire	1B	USC	
1985	B. J. Surhoff	C	North Carolina	
1986	Jeff King	3B	Arkansas	
1987	Robin Ventura	3B	Oklahoma State	
1988	Robin Ventura (2)	3B	Oklahoma State	
1989	Ben McDonald	P	LSU	
1990	Mike Kelly	OF	Arizona State	
1991	Not awarded			
1992	Mike Smith	SS	Indiana	
1993	Paul LoDuca	C	Arizona State	
1994	Not awarded			
1995	Not awarded			
1996	Not awarded			
1997	J. D. Drew	OF	Florida State	
1998	Seth Etherton	P	USC	
1999	Not awarded			
2000	Mark Teixeira	3B	Georgia Tech	
2001	Mark Prior	P	USC	

== See also ==
- List of college baseball awards
- College Baseball Hall of Fame
