= National College Baseball Hall of Fame =

Hall of fame for the game of college baseball in the US

Coordinates: 33.580227°N 101.845830°W

- Founder: College Baseball Foundation
- Location: Lubbock, Texas
- Website: www.collegebaseballhall.org

The National College Baseball Hall of Fame is an institution operated by the College Baseball Foundation serving as the central point for the study of the history of college baseball in the United States. In partnership with the Southwest Collection/Special Collections Library located on the campus of Texas Tech University in Lubbock, Texas, the Hall of Fame inducts former collegiate players and coaches who have met selection criteria of distinction. On January 23, 2024, the College Baseball Foundation announced it would open a physical hall of fame in Overland Park, Kansas, in the Museum at Prairiefire.

== History ==
The College Baseball Foundation was formed in 2004 as a non-profit organization, with the dual aims of continuing the Brooks Wallace Award and creating a national college baseball hall of fame. The inaugural Wallace Award was bestowed in 2004, but the inaugural Hall of Fame induction class was not chosen until 2006. As of 2006, organizers hoped to have a permanent building constructed by 2008. As of January 2013, the Foundation had raised approximately $7 million of the $13 million goal, after receiving a $5 million grant from the Moody Foundation. A ceremonial groundbreaking was held in June 2015 in Lubbock. In April 2017, the Foundation announced that it would no longer pursue constructing a museum in Lubbock.

== Inductees ==
The 2006 inaugural class for the National College Baseball Hall of Fame consisted of five former coaches and five former players. Annually thereafter, through 2016, additional players and coaches were enshrined. In May 2017, organizers cancelled that year's annual “Night of Champions” induction ceremony.

Key
†	Member of the National Baseball Hall of Fame and Museum

=== Players ===
Year	Inductee	Position(s)	University
2006	Will Clark	First baseman	Mississippi State
2006	Bob Horner	Infielder	Arizona State
2006	Brooks Kieschnick	Outfielder	Texas
2006	Brooks Kieschnick	Pitcher	Texas
2006	Dave Winfield^{†}	Outfielder	Minnesota
2006	Dave Winfield^{†}	Pitcher	Minnesota
2006	Robin Ventura	Third baseman	Oklahoma State
2007	Jim Abbott	Pitcher	Michigan
2007	Pete Incaviglia	Outfielder	Oklahoma State
2007	Fred Lynn	Outfielder	Southern California
2007	John Olerud	First baseman	Washington State
2007	John Olerud	Pitcher	Washington State
2007	Phil Stephenson	First baseman	Wichita State
2007	Derek Tatsuno	Pitcher	Hawaii
2008	Steve Arlin	Pitcher	Ohio State
2008	Eddie Bane	Pitcher	Arizona State
2008	Floyd Bannister	Pitcher	Arizona State
2008	Neal Heaton	Pitcher	Miami
2008	Burt Hooton	Pitcher	Texas
2008	Dick Howser	Infielder	Florida State
2008	Ben McDonald	Pitcher	Louisiana State
2008	Greg Swindell	Pitcher	Texas
2009	Joe Carter	Outfielder	Wichita State
2009	Darren Dreifort	First baseman	Wichita State
2009	Darren Dreifort	Pitcher	Wichita State
2009	Kirk Dressendorfer	Pitcher	Texas
2009	Barry Larkin^{†}	Shortstop	Michigan
2009	Keith Moreland	Third baseman	Texas
2009	Rafael Palmeiro	First baseman	Mississippi State
2009	Rafael Palmeiro	Outfielder	Mississippi State
2009	Todd Walker	Second baseman	Louisiana State
2010	Alan Bannister	Shortstop	Arizona State
2010	Eddy Furniss	First baseman	Louisiana State
2010	Don Heinkel	Pitcher	Wichita State
2010	Dave Magadan	First baseman	Alabama
2010	Dave Magadan	Third baseman	Alabama
2010	B. J. Surhoff	Catcher	North Carolina
2010	Rich Wortham	Pitcher	Texas
2011	Terry Francona	Outfielder	Arizona
2011	Danny Goodwin	Catcher	Southern
2011	Dick Groat	Shortstop	Duke
2011	Oddibe McDowell	Centerfielder	Arizona State
2011	Tim Wallach	First baseman	Cal State Fullerton
2012	Lou Brock^{†}	Outfielder	Southern
2012	Nomar Garciaparra	Shortstop	Georgia Tech
2012	Tim Jorgensen	Shortstop	Wisconsin–Oshkosh
2012	Brad Wilkerson	First baseman	Florida
2012	Brad Wilkerson	Pitcher	Florida
2013	Sal Bando	Third baseman	Arizona State
2013	Tom Borland	Pitcher	Oklahoma State
2013	Ralph Garr	Second baseman	Grambling State
2013	Tino Martinez	First baseman	Tampa
2013	Roy Smalley III	Shortstop	Southern California
2014	Bill Bordley	Pitcher	Southern California
2014	Alex Fernandez	Pitcher	Miami
2014	Alex Fernandez	Pitcher	Miami Dade College
2014	Mike Fiore	Outfielder	Miami
2014	Mickey Sullivan	Outfielder	Baylor
2015	Joe Arnold	Pitcher	Miami Dade College
2015	Joe Arnold	Pitcher	Arizona State
2015	Lance Berkman	First baseman	Rice
2015	Al Holland	Pitcher	North Carolina A&T
2015	Mike Kelly	Outfielder	Arizona State
2015	Rick Reichardt	Outfielder	Wisconsin
2015	Frank Viola	Pitcher	St. John's
2016	Matt DeSalvo	Pitcher	Marietta
2016	J. D. Drew	Outfielder	Florida State
2016	Rick Monday	Outfielder	Arizona State
2016	Tom Paciorek	Outfielder	Houston
2019	Dave Chalk	Third baseman	Texas
2019	Andre Dawson^{†}	Outfielder	Florida A&M
2019	Wally Hood	Pitcher	Southern California
2019	Mark Kotsay	Outfielder	Cal State Fullerton
2019	Billy Wagner^{†}	Pitcher	Ferrum
2020	Doug Ault	First baseman	Texas Tech
2020	Pete Barnes	Outfielder	Southern
2020	Rick Cerone	Catcher	Seton Hall
2020	John Deutsch	Infielder	Montclair State
2020	Gary Gentry	Pitcher	Arizona State
2020	Jim Gideon	Pitcher	Texas
2020	Roy Lee Jackson	Pitcher	Tuskegee
2020	Paul Molitor^{†}	Infielder	Minnesota
2020	Jason Varitek	Catcher	Georgia Tech
2021	Rusty Adkins	Outfielder	Clemson
2021	Rusty Adkins	Second baseman	Clemson
2021	Tom Brennan		Lewis
2021	Tim Burzette		La Verne
2021	Rich Dauer		Cal State San Bernardino
2021	Rich Dauer		Southern California
2021	Todd Helton^{†}		Tennessee
2021	Terry Kennedy		Florida State
2021	Gregg Olson		Auburn
2022	Bill Almon	Infielder	Brown
2022	Casey Close		Michigan
2022	Condredge Holloway		Tennessee
2022	Ken Ritter		North Central
2022	Rickie Weeks		Southern
2023	Chris Bando	Catcher	Arizona State
2023	Ron Darling	Pitcher	Yale
2023	Ron Darling	Outfielder	Yale
2023	Mike Fuentes	Outfielder	Florida State
2023	Alex Gordon	Third baseman	Nebraska
2023	Steve Kemp	Outfielder	Southern California
2023	Russell Martin	Pitcher	Southwestern
2024	Roger Clemens	Pitcher	San Jacinto North
2024	Roger Clemens	Pitcher	Texas
2024	Jeff King	Third baseman	Arkansas
2024	Randy Ross	Shortstop	North Park
2024	Mike Schmidt^{†}	Shortstop	Ohio
2024	Mark Teixeira	Third baseman	Georgia Tech
2024	Bill Thom	Pitcher	Southern California
2024	Murray Wall	Pitcher	Texas
2025	Gene Ammann	Pitcher	Florida State
2025	Kris Benson	Pitcher	Clemson
2025	Kip Bouknight	Pitcher	South Carolina
2025	Hubie Brooks	Shortstop	Mesa College
2025	Hubie Brooks	Shortstop	Arizona State
2025	Gene Hooks	Third baseman	Wake Forest
2025	Mike Loynd	Pitcher	Florida State
2025	Mark McGwire	First baseman	Southern California
2025	Mark McGwire	Pitcher	Southern California
2025	Phil Nevin	Third baseman	Cal State Fullerton
2025	David Price	Pitcher	Vanderbilt
2025	Earl Sanders	Pitcher	Jackson State
2025	Mike Stenhouse	Outfielder	Harvard
2025	Stephen Strasburg	Pitcher	San Diego State
2025	Joe Thomas	Pitcher	Marietta College
2025	Joe Thomas	First baseman	Marietta College
2026	Earl Bass	Pitcher	South Carolina
2026	Barry Bonds	Outfielder	Arizona State
2026	Jeff Brantley	Pitcher	Mississippi State
2026	Dave Clark	Outfielder	Jackson State
2026	Bruce Gardner	Pitcher	USC
2026	Marquis Grissom	Pitcher	Florida A&M
2026	Marquis Grissom	Outfielder	Florida A&M
2026	Bobby Jones	Pitcher	Fresno State
2026	Bobby Layne	Pitcher	Southern California
2026	Scott Livingstone	Third baseman	Texas A&M
2026	David McCarty	First baseman	Stanford
2026	Lloyd Peever	Pitcher	LSU
2026	Buster Posey	Catcher	Florida State
2026	Mike Smith	Infielder	Indiana
2026	Dave Stegman	Outfielder	Arizona
2026	Huston Street	Pitcher	Texas
2026	Brent Strom	Pitcher	USC

=== Head coaches ===
Year	Inductee	University
2006	Skip Bertman	Louisiana State
2006	Rod Dedeaux	Southern California
2006	Ron Fraser	Miami
2006	Cliff Gustafson	Texas
2006	Bobby Winkles	Arizona State
2007	Chuck Brayton	Washington State
2007	Jim Brock	Arizona State
2007	Bibb Falk	Texas
2007	Jerry Kindall	Arizona
2007	Dick Siebert	Minnesota
2008
2008	Gary Ward	New Mexico State
2008	Gary Ward	Oklahoma State
2009	Gordie Gillespie	St. Francis
2009	Ron Polk	Georgia
2009	Ron Polk	Georgia Southern
2009	Ron Polk	Mississippi State
2010	Bob Bennett	Fresno State
2010	Wally Kincaid	Cerritos College
2011	Ralph Waldo Emerson Jones	Grambling
2011	Bill Wilhelm	Clemson
2012	Ed Cheff	Lewis–Clark State
2012	Wayne Graham	Rice
2012	Wayne Graham	San Jacinto College
2012	Frank Sancet	Arizona
2013	Don Schaly	Marietta College
2013	John Winkin	Colby College
2013	John Winkin	Husson College
2013	John Winkin	Maine
2014	Demie Mainieri	Miami-Dade North Community College
2014	Gene Stephenson	Wichita State
2015	Larry Hays	Lubbock Christian
2015	Larry Hays	Texas Tech
2015	Bill Holowaty	Eastern Connecticut
2016	Robert Braddy	Jackson State
2016	Augie Garrido	San Francisco State
2016	Augie Garrido	Cal Poly
2016	Augie Garrido	Cal State Fullerton
2016	Augie Garrido	Illinois
2016	Augie Garrido	Texas
2016	Tommy Thomas	Valdosta State
2019	Mike Martin	Florida State
2019	Lloyd Simmons	Seminole State
2020	Jim Morris	Georgia Tech
2020	Jim Morris	Miami
2020	John Scolinos	Pepperdine
2020	John Scolinos	Cal Poly Pomona
2021	Robert Lee	Southern
2021	Danny Litwhiler	Florida State
2021	Danny Litwhiler	Michigan State
2021	Mark Marquess	Stanford
2021	Frank Vieira	New Haven
2022	Roger Cador	Southern
2022	Ken Dugan	Lipscomb
2022	Andy Lopez	Pepperdine
2022	Andy Lopez	Florida
2022	Andy Lopez	Arizona
2022	Art Mazmanian	Mount San Antonio College
2023	Pat Casey	George Fox College
2023	Pat Casey	Oregon State
2023	Jack Coffey	Fordham
2023	Mike Metheny	Southeastern Oklahoma State
2023	Marty Miller	Norfolk State
2024	Wilbert Ellis	Grambling State
2024	Mike Fox	North Carolina Wesleyan
2024	Mike Fox	North Carolina
2024	Woody Hunt	Cumberland
2025	Norm DeBriyn	Arkansas
2025	Clint Evans	California
2025	Ray Fisher	Middlebury
2025	Ray Fisher	Michigan
2025	Les Murakami	Hawaii
2025	Ray Tanner	North Carolina State
2025	Ray Tanner	South Carolina
2025	Jerry Weinstein	Sacramento City
2026	Danny Hall	Kent State
2026	Danny Hall	Georgia Tech
2026	Hal Smeltzly	Florida Southern

=== Veteran players (pre-1947 era) ===
Year	Inductee	University
2007	Jack Barry	Holy Cross
2007	Lou Gehrig^{†}	Columbia
2007	Christy Mathewson^{†}	Bucknell
2007	Joe Sewell^{†}	Alabama
2008	Billy Disch	Texas
2008	Ownie Carroll	Holy Cross
2008	Jackie Robinson^{†}	UCLA
2009	Branch Rickey^{†}	Michigan
2009	Branch Rickey^{†}	Ohio Wesleyan
2010	George Sisler^{†}	Michigan
2010	Charlie Teague	Wake Forest
2014	William Clarence Matthews	Tuskegee Institute
2014	William Clarence Matthews	Harvard
2021	Frank Quinn	Yale

=== Executives ===
Year	Inductee	Association
2019	Dennis Poppe	NCAA
2020	Everett Barnes	American Baseball Coaches Association
2021	Dave Keilitz	American Baseball Coaches Association
2024	Jim Paronto	NCAA
2025	Scott Boras	Agent
2026	Jim Darby	Contributor

=== Umpires ===
Year	Inductee	Association
2011	Dick Runchey	
2012	Rich Fetchiet	
2013	Dale Williams	
2014	Hank Rountree	
2015	John Magnusson	
2016	Gus Steiner	
2019	Jon Bible	
2020	Randy Christal	
2021	Dave Yeast	NCAA
2022	Jim Garman	NCAA
2023	C.J. Mitchell	NCAA
2023	Tony Thompson	NCAA
2025	Paul Guillie	NCAA
2026	Gus Rodriguez	NCAA
2026	Tony Walsh	NCAA

== Induction ==
=== Criteria ===
Selection criteria and categorization has changed over time.

The original criteria, established in 2006, allow for recognition of:

- Coaches — eligible after ending their active collegiate career (and not actively coaching a professional baseball team) who have achieved 300 career wins or won at least 65% of their games.
- Players — eligible five years after their final collegiate season (and not actively playing professional baseball) who competed for at least one year at a four-year institution, and made an All American (post-1947) or All League (pre-1947) team.
- Teams — of "great achievement" at a four-year institution.

The top ten voter-getters were selected for induction to the Hall of Fame. Veteran and Historical Committees could nominate individuals from the pre-1947 era, however there was no differentiation in how approved nominees were recognized.

In 2009, a small school category was added, "featuring players and coaches from NAIA, NCAA Divisions II and III, and two-year colleges."

In 2011, a Legends and Pioneers Committee was created, "...designed to provide recognition to black pioneers in college baseball and to honor outstanding players and coaches whose careers at Historically Black Colleges and Universities began prior to 1975." Also, nominees would now be required to reach a threshold of votes, rather than automatically inducting the top ten vote-getters.

In 2012, voting was revised with five ballot categories: Vintage Era (pre-1964) players and coaches, small school players, small school coaches, 1964–2001 players, and NCAA Division I coaches.

=== Ceremony ===
The induction ceremony for the inaugural class occurred on July 4, 2006. The “Night of Champions” was usually held the day after the Brooks Wallace Award winner was announced; the most recent induction ceremony was held in 2016.

== See also ==
- Baseball awards#U.S. college baseball
- Helms Athletic Foundation
- List of college baseball awards
- List of museums in West Texas

== Notes ==
National Collegiate Umpire Award recipients from 2011 to 2020 "[became] part of their year’s induction class" during 2021.
