= List of college baseball awards =

There are a number of national college baseball awards given each year. Here are the most prominent:

== Team championships ==
- College World Series championship (NCAA Division I)
- NCAA Division II championship
- NCAA Division III championship
- NAIA Baseball World Series championship

== Player awards ==
=== National Players of the Year ===
- Golden Spikes Award – Presented by USA Baseball to the amateur baseball player of the year. It has always been given to a college baseball player; two winners were junior college players, and all of the rest have been NCAA Division I players.
- Dick Howser Trophy – player of the year, as determined by the National Collegiate Baseball Writers Association.
- Baseball America College Player of the Year
- Collegiate Baseball Player of the Year (NCAA Division I)
- American Baseball Coaches Association (ABCA) Player of the Year in: NCAA Divisions I, II, and III, NAIA, and NJCAA Divisions I, II, and III

=== National Positional Award ===
- National Pitcher of the Year Award - Pitcher of the year, as determined by the College Baseball Foundation
- Buster Posey Award – catcher of the year, as determined by selected sportscasters, sportswriters, Division I head coaches and professional scouts.
- Johnny Bench Award – catcher of the year, presented by MSA Sport
- Brooks Wallace Award – shortstop of the year, as determined by the College Baseball Foundation
- Bobby Bragan Collegiate Slugger Award- awarded to the best hitter in the nation, as determined by the Selection Committee for Bobby Bragan Collegiate Slugger Award
- John Olerud Award – given to the best two-way player of the year, as determined by the College Baseball Foundation
- Stopper of the Year Award – given to the best relief pitcher in college baseball
- College Baseball All-America Teams:

=== Postseason ===
- College World Series Most Outstanding Player (Division I)
- College World Series Most Outstanding Player (Division II)
- College World Series Most Outstanding Player (Division III)

=== Conference Awards ===
- All D1 conferences name a Player of the Year and Pitcher of the Year.

== Coaching awards ==
- American Baseball Coaches Association (ABCA) National and Regional Coaches of the Year in: NCAA Divisions I, II, and III, NAIA, and NJCAA Divisions I, II, and III
- Baseball America College Coach of the Year
- Collegiate Baseball Coach of the Year (NCAA Division I)
- National Collegiate Baseball Writers Association (NCBWA) National Coach of the Year
- Chuck Tanner Collegiate Baseball Manager of the Year Award
- ABCA/Baseball America Assistant Coach of the Year
- Skip Bertman Award (head coaches) (College Baseball Foundation)

== Discontinued awards ==
- Rotary Smith Award (1988-2003) – Founded by the Greater Houston Sports Association in 1988 to honor the most outstanding player of the year. In 1996, the Rotary Club of Houston joined the award committee. In 2004, it was succeeded by the Roger Clemens Award (honoring the most outstanding college baseball pitcher).
- Roger Clemens Award (2004-2008) – pitcher of the year, as determined by Division I head coaches, a selection of national sports media, previous finalists for the Clemens Award and the 16 last winners of the Rotary Smith Award.

== See also ==
- Baseball awards § U.S. college baseball
- Baseball awards § U.S. collegiate summer baseball
- List of college baseball career home run leaders
- NCAA § Awards
- List of organized baseball leagues § College baseball
- List of collegiate summer baseball leagues
