= 2026 College Baseball All-America Team =

This is a list of college baseball players named first team All-Americans for the 2026 NCAA Division I baseball season. Since 2024, there have been six generally recognized All-America selectors for baseball: the American Baseball Coaches Association, Baseball America, the College Baseball Foundation, D1Baseball.com, the National Collegiate Baseball Writers Association, and Perfect Game. In order to be considered a "consensus" All-American, a player must have been selected by at least four of these.

== Key ==
A	American Baseball Coaches Association
B	Baseball America
F	College Baseball Foundation
D	D1Baseball.com
N	National Collegiate Baseball Writers Association
P	Perfect Game
	Member of the National College Baseball Hall of Fame
	Consensus All-American – selected by all six organizations
	Consensus All-American – selected by four or five organizations

== All-Americans ==
Position	Name	School	#	A	B	F	D	N	P	Other awards and honors
Starting pitcher	Jason DeCaro	North Carolina	2	—	—	✓	—	✓	—	
Starting pitcher	Mason Edwards	USC	6	✓	✓	✓	✓	✓	✓	Baseball America Pitcher of the Year
Starting pitcher	Jackson Flora	UC Santa Barbara	6	✓	✓	✓	✓	✓	✓	ABCA Pitcher of the Year National Pitcher of the Year
Starting pitcher	Aidan King	Florida	1	—	—	—	—	✓	—	
Starting pitcher	Wes Mendes	Florida State	1	—	—	—	✓	—	—	
Starting pitcher	Tomas Valinius	Mississippi State	1	—	—	—	—	✓	—	
Starting pitcher	Dylan Volantis	Texas	5	✓	✓	✓	—	✓	✓	
Starting pitcher	Dax Whitney	Oregon State	4	✓	✓	✓	—	—	✓	
Starting pitcher	Maxx Yehl	West Virginia	3	—	—	✓	✓	—	✓	
Relief pitcher	John Abraham	Florida State	1	—	—	✓	—	—	—	
Relief pitcher	Tanner Bradley	Oregon	1	—	—	—	—	✓	—	
Relief pitcher	Sam Cozart	Texas	6	✓	✓	✓	✓	✓	✓	Stopper of the Year Award
Relief pitcher	Clayton Freshcorn	Texas A&M	2	✓	—	—	—	✓	—	
Relief pitcher	Caden Glauber	North Carolina	4	—	✓	✓	✓	—	✓	
Relief pitcher	Easton Hawk	UCLA	2	✓	—	—	—	✓	—	
Relief pitcher	Wylan Moss	UCLA	1	—	—	✓	—	—	—	
Relief pitcher	Albert Roblez	Oregon State	3	—	—	✓	—	✓	✓	
Catcher / DH	Daniel Jackson	Georgia	6	✓	✓	✓	✓	✓	✓	Golden Spikes Award Dick Howser Trophy ABCA Position Player of the Year Buster Posey Award
Catcher / DH	Vahn Lackey	Georgia Tech	5	✓	✓	✓	✓	—	✓	Johnny Bench Award
First baseman	Tague Davis	Louisville	6	✓	✓	✓	✓	✓	✓	
First baseman	Jackson Marshall	UConn	1	—	—	✓	—	—	—	
Second baseman	Jarren Advincula	Georgia Tech	5	✓	✓	✓	—	✓	✓	
Second baseman	Gavin Kelly	West Virginia	2	—	—	✓	✓	—	—	
Shortstop	Dylan Carey	Nebraska	1	—	—	✓	—	—	—	Brooks Wallace Award
Shortstop	Roch Cholowsky	UCLA	6	✓	✓	✓	✓	✓	✓	
Shortstop	Tyson Leblanc	Kansas	1	—	—	—	—	✓	—	
Third baseman	Tre Phelps	Georgia	3	✓	—	✓	—	✓	—	
Third baseman	Ace Reese	Mississippi State	3	—	✓	✓	—	—	✓	
Third baseman	Ryan Zuckerman	Georgia Tech	1	—	—	—	✓	—	—	
Outfielder	Drew Burress	Georgia Tech	6	✓	✓	✓	✓	✓	✓	
Outfielder	Lorenzo Carrier	Pittsburgh	1	—	—	—	—	✓	—	
Outfielder	Will Gasparino	UCLA	2	—	—	✓	—	✓	—	
Outfielder	Landon Hairston	Arizona State	6	✓	✓	✓	✓	✓	✓	Baseball America Player of the Year
Outfielder	Owen Hull	North Carolina	1	—	—	—	✓	—	—	
Outfielder	Chris Katz	Mercer	1	—	—	✓	—	—	—	
Outfielder	Hunter Ray	Fairleigh Dickinson	1	✓	—	—	—		—	
Outfielder	Kollin Ritchie	Oklahoma State	2	✓	—	✓	—	—	—	
Outfielder	Aiden Robbins	Texas	3	—	✓	✓	—	✓	—	
Outfielder	Caden Sorrell	Texas A&M	4	✓	—	✓	—	✓	✓	
Designated hitter	Michael Anderson	Penn State	1	✓	—	—	—	—	—	
Designated hitter	Maddox Haley	Georgia	2	—	—	✓	—	✓	—	
Utility player	Quinton Coats	Cincinnati	1	—	—	—	—	—	✓	
Utility player	Evan Dempsey	Florida Gulf Coast	6	✓	✓	✓	✓	✓	✓	John Olerud Award
Utility player	Braydon Kersey	Mercer	1	—	—	✓	—	—	—	
Utility player	Ryan Kroepel	Utah Tech	1	—	—	✓	—	—	—	
Utility player	Caden McDonald	Florida	1	—	—	✓	—	—	—	

== See also ==
- List of college baseball awards
