= 2025 College Baseball All-America Team =

This is a list of college baseball players named first team All-Americans for the 2025 NCAA Division I baseball season. Since 2024, there have been six generally recognized All-America selectors for baseball: the American Baseball Coaches Association, Baseball America, the College Baseball Foundation, D1Baseball.com, the National Collegiate Baseball Writers Association, and Perfect Game. In order to be considered a "consensus" All-American, a player must have been selected by at least four of these.

== Key ==
A	American Baseball Coaches Association
B	Baseball America
F	College Baseball Foundation
D	D1Baseball.com
N	National Collegiate Baseball Writers Association
P	Perfect Game
	Member of the National College Baseball Hall of Fame
	Consensus All-American – selected by all six organizations
	Consensus All-American – selected by four or five organizations

== All-Americans ==
Position	Name	School	#	A	B	F	D	N	P	Other awards and honors
Starting pitcher	Kade Anderson	LSU	6	✓	✓	✓	✓	✓	✓	Baseball America Pitcher of the Year College World Series Most Outstanding Player
Starting pitcher	Jamie Arnold	Florida State	4	✓	—	✓	—	✓	✓	
Starting pitcher	Liam Doyle	Tennessee	6	✓	✓	✓	✓	✓	✓	
Starting pitcher	Anthony Eyanson	LSU	1	—	✓	—	—	—	—	
Starting pitcher	Jake Knapp	North Carolina	4	✓	—	✓	✓	✓	—	National Pitcher of the Year
Starting pitcher	JB Middleton	Southern Miss	2	—	—	—	—	✓	✓	
Starting pitcher	Jacob Morrison	Coastal Carolina	4	✓	—	✓	✓	✓	—	ABCA Pitcher of the Year
Starting pitcher	Kyson Witherspoon	Oklahoma	4	—	✓	—	✓	✓	✓	
Relief pitcher	Gabe Craig	Baylor	3	—	✓	✓	—	✓	—	
Relief pitcher	Antoine Jean	Houston	3	—	—	✓	✓	—	✓	
Relief pitcher	Lucas Mahlstedt	Clemson	2	—	—	—	—	✓	✓	
Relief pitcher	Carson Ozmer	Alabama	1	—	—	—	—	✓	—	
Relief pitcher	Tony Pluta	Arizona	3	✓	—	✓	—	✓	—	Stopper of the Year Award
Relief pitcher	Chase Shores	LSU	1	—	—	✓	—	—	—	
Relief pitcher	Dylan Volantis	Texas	5	✓	✓	✓	✓	✓	—	
Catcher	Caden Bodine	Coastal Carolina	2	—	—	✓	✓	—	—	Buster Posey Award Johnny Bench Award
Catcher	Easton Carmichael	Oklahoma	2	—	—	✓	—	—	✓	
Catcher	Grant Jay	Dallas Baptist	1	✓	—	—	—	—	—	
Catcher	Carson Tinney	Notre Dame	2	—	✓	—	—	✓	—	
First baseman	Andrew Fischer	Tennessee	6	✓	✓	✓	✓	✓	✓	
First baseman	Jared Jones	LSU	2	—	—	✓	—	✓	—	
Second baseman	Ryan Daniels	UConn	1	—	—	✓	—	—	—	
Second baseman	Kaleb Freeman	Georgia State	1	—	—	—	✓	—	—	
Second baseman	Gavin Kilen	Tennessee	3	—	✓	✓	—	—	✓	
Second baseman	Nick Monistere	Southern Miss	1	—	—	—	—	✓	—	
Second baseman	Nick Rodriguez	Missouri State	1	✓	—	—	—	—	—	
Second baseman	A. J. Singer	Oregon State	1	—	—	✓	—	—	—	
Shortstop	Wehiwa Aloy	Arkansas	3	✓	—	✓	—	—	✓	Golden Spikes Award
Shortstop	Roch Cholowsky	UCLA	5	✓	✓	✓	✓	—	✓	ABCA Position Player of the Year Baseball America Player of the Year Brooks Wallace Award
Shortstop / DH	Alex Lodise	Florida State	5	—	✓	✓	✓	✓	✓	Dick Howser Trophy
Third baseman	Kerrington Cross	Cincinnati	2	—	—	✓	—	—	✓	
Third baseman	Daniel Cuvet	Miami (FL)	4	✓	✓	✓	✓	—	—	
Third baseman	Ben Miller	Duke	1	—	—	✓	—	—	—	
Third baseman	Ace Reese	Mississippi State	1	—	—	—	—	✓	—	
Outfielder	Robbie Burnett	Georgia	1	—	—	—	—	✓	—	
Outfielder	Drew Burress	Georgia Tech	5	✓	—	✓	✓	✓	✓	
Outfielder	Harrison Feinberg	Northeastern	1	—	—	—	—	✓	—	
Outfielder	Ike Irish	Auburn	5	✓	✓	✓	✓	—	✓	
Outfielder	Jace LaViolette	Texas A&M	1	—	—	✓	—	—	—	
Outfielder	Mason Neville	Oregon	1	—	—	—	—	✓	—	
Outfielder	James Quinn-Irons	George Mason	4	✓	✓	—	✓	✓	—	
Outfielder	Sawyer Strosnider	TCU	1	—	—	✓	—	—	—	
Outfielder	Devin Taylor	Indiana	3	—	✓	✓	—	—	✓	
Outfielder	Gavin Turley	Oregon State	2	✓	—	✓	—	—	—	
Outfielder	Ryan Wideman	Western Kentucky	2	✓	—	—	—	✓	—	
Designated hitter	Kuhio Aloy	Arkansas	1	—	—	✓	—	—	—	
Designated hitter	Johnny Sweeney	USC Upstate	1	✓	—	—	—	—	—	
Designated hitter	Ryland Zaborowski	Georgia	3	✓	—	—	—	✓	✓	
Utility player	Bryce Calloway	New Orleans	2	✓	—	✓	—	—	—	
Utility player	Evan Dempsey	Florida Gulf Coast	4	—	✓	✓	✓	—	✓	John Olerud Award
Utility player	Noah Sullivan	Mississippi State	1	—	—	—	—	✓	—	

== See also ==
- List of college baseball awards
