= Southeastern Conference Baseball Freshman of the Year =

- Awarded for: Most outstanding freshman baseball player in the Southeastern Conference
- Country: United States
- First award: 2000-present
- Currently held by: Anthony Pack Jr., Texas

The Southeastern Conference Freshman of the Year is a baseball award given to the Southeastern Conference's most outstanding player. The award was first given following the 2000 season, with both pitchers and position players eligible. It is selected by the league's head coaches, who are not allowed to vote for their own players.

== Key ==
*	Awarded a National Freshman Player of the Year award from either Baseball America or the Collegiate Baseball

== Winners ==
Season	Pitcher	School	Reference
2000	Mike Fontenot *	LSU	
2001	Lane Mestepey	LSU	
2002	Seth Smith	Ole Miss	
2003	Stephen Head *	Ole Miss*	
2004	Wade LeBlanc*	Alabama	
2005	J.P. Arencibia	Tennessee	
2006	Pedro Alvarez *	Vanderbilt	
2007	Jordan Henry	Ole Miss	
2008	Hunter Morris	Auburn	
2009	Matty Ott; Preston Tucker	LSU; Florida	
2010	Austin Maddox	Florida	
2011	Tony Kemp	Vanderbilt	
2012	Austin Cousino	Florida	
2013	Alex Bregman	LSU	
2014	Logan Shore	Florida	
2015	Alex Lange	LSU	
2016	Jake Mangum	Mississippi State	
2017	Braden Shewmake	Texas A&M	
2018	Heston Kjerstad	Arkansas	
2019	J. T. Ginn	Mississippi State	
2021	Enrique Bradfield	Vanderbilt	
2022	Drew Beam	Tennessee	
2023	Charlie Condon	Georgia	
2024	Gavin Grahovac	Texas A&M	
2025	Dylan Volantis	Texas	
2026	Anthony Pack Jr.	Texas	

== Winners by school ==
School (year joined)	Winners	Years
LSU (1932)	5	2000, 2001, 2009, 2013, 2015
Florida (1932)	4	2009, 2010, 2012, 2014
Ole Miss (1932)	3	2002, 2003, 2007
Vanderbilt (1932)	3	2006, 2011, 2021
Mississippi State (1932)	2	2016, 2019
Tennessee (1932)	2	2005, 2022
Texas (2024)	2	2025, 2026
Texas A&M (2012)	2	2017, 2024
Arkansas (1991)	1	2018
Alabama (1932)	1	2004
Auburn (1932)	1	2008
Georgia (1932)	1	2023
Kentucky (1932)	0	—
South Carolina (1991)	0	—
Missouri (2012)	0	—
Oklahoma (2024)	0	
