= Johnny Bench Award =

The Johnny Bench Award may refer to:

- Buster Posey Award, given to the top catcher in college baseball since 2000, known as the Johnny Bench Award until 2018
- Johnny Bench Award (2019 to present), given to the top catcher in college baseball and in college softball since 2019
