= Evan Dempsey =

American baseball player (born 2005)

Detroit Tigers
- Pitcher
- Born: July 19, 2005 (age 21); Tampa, Florida, U.S.
- Bats: Left Throws: Right
- Stats at Baseball Reference

Evan Francis Dempsey (born July 19, 2005) is an American professional baseball pitcher in the Detroit Tigers organization. He played college baseball for the Florida Gulf Coast Eagles and won the John Olerud Award in 2025 and 2026.

== Early life ==
Dempsey was born on July 19, 2005, in Tampa, Florida. He started playing rec baseball at age five. Dempsey attended Newsome High School in Lithia, Florida, where he played baseball for the Wolves under head coach Dick Rohrberg. By his sophomore year, he was a starting pitcher and outfielder as well as the leadoff hitter. As a senior, Dempsey batted .427 and recorded a 7–4 win–loss record with 84 strikeouts and a 1.45 earned run average (ERA). He earned first-team all-county honors for both hitting and pitching. Dempsey was also invited to play in the FACA All-Star Classic. Outside of school, he played for Ostingers Baseball Academy.

Dempsey was ranked the 418th-best high school prospect in the class of 2023 by Perfect Game. On June 1, 2022, (Note: The source gives the incorrect year.) he committed to playing college baseball at Florida Gulf Coast University (FGCU). "Once I did some research into the school, I knew this was where I wanted to go", said Dempsey. He signed a National Letter of Intent with the Eagles in November.

== College career ==
As a freshman at FGCU, Dempsey started 46 of 50 games. He finished second on the team with a .339 average, to go along with 62 hits and 48 runs batted in (RBI). Despite spending most of the year in the outfield due to the Eagles' deep pitching corps, Dempsey also made six appearances as a relief pitcher, recording a 10.13 ERA in 5 1/3 innings pitched. He earned Atlantic Sun Conference (ASUN) all-freshman honors, and played with the Minot Hot Tots of the Northwoods League after the season.

As a sophomore, Dempsey played in all 60 games (with 59 starts) in the outfield, batting .309 with a team-high 71 hits. Additionally, he was moved from the bullpen into a starting pitcher role during conference play after the team lost three starting pitchers to injury. Dempsey pitched in 15 games with 10 starts, compiling a 5–1 record with 75 strikeouts and a 1.97 ERA over 68 2/3 innings. He was a consensus selection to the 2025 College Baseball All-America Team, earning first-team honors from Baseball America, the College Baseball Foundation, D1Baseball.com, and Perfect Game. Dempsey won the John Olerud Award, which is given to the best two-way player in the nation; he also earned first-team All-ASUN honors as a pitcher and a second-team ASUN honors as an outfielder. His head coach, Dave Tollett, said he was "a special kind of player that only comes around once or twice in a coach’s career". That summer, Dempsey played for the Harwich Mariners of the Cape Cod Baseball League. He also received an invite to the U.S. collegiate national team training camp in North Carolina, becoming the first player in FGCU history to do so.

Ahead of his junior season, Dempsey received "plenty of offers" from higher-profile programs to transfer out of FGCU, but decided to remain with the Eagles. He also gained 20 lb (9.1 kg) of muscle during the offseason.

In his junior year, Dempsey played and started in 58 games in the outfield, batting .333 with 10 home runs and 79 hits. He also pitched in 15 games (all starts), totaling a 7–2 record with 126 strikeouts, two complete game shutouts, and a 3.15 ERA over 88 2/3 innings, becoming the ace of the pitching staff at FGCU. During the season, Dempsey was named the D1Baseball.com Midseason Player of the Year. For the second straight year, he was a consensus (this time unanimous) selection to the College Baseball All-America Team as a utility player. The unanimous selection was the second in FGCU history after Chris Sale. He won the Atlantic Sun Conference's Pitcher of the Year award. He also repeated as the recipient of the John Olerud Award while advancing as a semifinalist for both the Golden Spikes Award and the Dick Howser Trophy.

Dempsey was considered one of the top two-way prospects in the 2026 Major League Baseball draft. He was invited to attend the 2026 MLB Draft Combine at Chase Field.

== Professional career ==
Dempsey was drafted 69th overall in the 2026 Major League Baseball draft by the Detroit Tigers as a pitcher and signed for an under-slot signing bonus of $1.20 million.

== Personal life ==
Dempsey grew up in the Tampa area in a blended family with two brothers, two stepbrothers, and two stepsisters. After his childhood coach, legendary Tampa figure Rich Luppino, died in 2022, Dempsey said in a 2026 interview: "I've been playing for him since then." He has a tattoo of one of Luppino's mottos: "Repetition is the mother of success".
