= 2026 Texas Longhorns baseball team =

College Baseball Season

2026 Texas Longhorns baseball

NCAA Austin Regional Champions NCAA Austin Super Regional Champions

College World Series, 1–2
- Conference: Southeastern Conference

Ranking
- Coaches: No. 5
- D1Baseball.com: No. 5
- Record: 46–15 (19–10 SEC)
- Head coach: Jim Schlossnagle (2nd season)
- Associate head coach: Nolan Cain (2nd season)
- Assistant coaches: Troy Tulowitzki (5th season); Max Weiner (2nd season)
- Home stadium: UFCU Disch–Falk Field

2026 Southeastern Conference baseball standings
	Conf.				Overall
Team	W		L	PCT	W		L	PCT
No. 3 Georgia ‍†‍‡‍^{y}	23	–	7	.767	53	–	14	.791
No. 5 Texas ‍‍‍^{y}	19	–	10	.655	46	–	15	.754
No. 17 Texas A&M ‍‍‍^{y}	18	–	11	.621	41	–	16	.719
No. 6 Alabama ‍‍‍^{y}	18	–	12	.600	42	–	21	.667
No. 16 Florida ‍‍‍^{y}	18	–	12	.600	41	–	21	.661
No. 9 Auburn ‍‍‍^{y}	17	–	13	.567	42	–	22	.656
No. 23 Arkansas ‍‍‍^{y}	17	–	13	.567	41	–	22	.651
No. 14 Mississippi State ‍‍‍^{y}	16	–	14	.533	43	–	19	.694
No. 7 Ole Miss ‍‍‍^{y}	15	–	15	.500	41	–	23	.641
Tennessee ‍‍‍^{y}	15	–	15	.500	38	–	22	.633
No. 1 Oklahoma ‍‍‍^{y}	14	–	16	.467	43	–	23	.652
Vanderbilt ‍‍‍	14	–	16	.467	33	–	25	.569
Kentucky ‍‍‍^{y}	13	–	17	.433	33	–	23	.589
LSU ‍‍‍	9	–	21	.300	30	–	28	.517
South Carolina ‍‍‍	7	–	23	.233	22	–	35	.386
Missouri ‍‍‍	6	–	24	.200	24	–	31	.436
† – Conference champion ‡ – Tournament champion y – Invited to the NCAA Tournament; As of June 22, 2026; Rankings from D1Baseball

The 2026 Texas Longhorns baseball team represented the University of Texas at Austin during the 2026 NCAA Division I baseball season. The Longhorns played their home games at UFCU Disch-Falk Field as a member of the Southeastern Conference (SEC). They were led by second-year head coach Jim Schlossnagle.

== Previous season ==
Texas finished the 2025 season 44–14, 22–8 in SEC play, were the SEC regular season champions, and hosted the Austin Regional where they were upset by the UTSA Roadrunners.

== Personnel ==
=== Roster ===
2026 Texas Longhorns roster
Pitchers: 4 – Jason Flores – Sophomore (6'1, 240); 11 – Kade Bing – Junior (6'1, 195); 12 – Haiden Leffew – Junior (6'1, 235); 13 – Ruger Riojas – Senior (6'0, 195); 19 – Jack McKernan – Freshman (5'11, 205); 27 – Cal Higgins – Graduate (6'4, 240); 28 – Grady Westphal – Freshman (6'2, 200); 30 – Kaleb Rogers – Freshman (5'11, 200); 33 – Connor McCreery – Senior (6'6, 235); 34 – Michael Winter – Freshman (6'5, 240); 35 – Sam Cozart – Freshman (6'6, 260); 38 – Max Grubbs – Senior (6'1, 220)	41 – Cody Howard – (redshirt) Senior (6'1, 210); 45 – Thomas Burns – Junior (6'3, 240); 46 – Ethan Walker – (redshirt) Junior (6'0, 200); 48 – Hudson Hamilton – Junior (6'1, 225); 53 – Luke Harrison – Graduate (6'2, 220); 55 – Jack Paris – Freshman (6'2, 230); 67 – Brody Walls – Freshman (6'0, 200); 80 – Cooper Rummel – Freshman (6'2, 235); 88 – Brett Crossland – Freshman (6'5, 255); 95 – Jadyn Furgason – Freshman (6'1, 195); 99 – Dylan Volantis – Sophomore (6'6, 220)	Catchers: 7 – Andrew Ermis – Junior (6'1, 210); 8 – Carson Tinney – Junior (6'4, 240); 14 – Presley Courville – Freshman (5'11, 185); Infielders: 0 – Jayden Duplantier (Note: Plays two different positions) – Senior (6'0, 200); 1 – Temo Becerra – (redshirt) Senior (6'0, 195); 5 – Ethan Mendoza – Junior (5'10, 200); 15 – Josh Livingston – Graduate (6'0, 215); 24 – Adrian Rodriguez – Sophomore (6'2, 200); 31 – Casey Borba – Junior (6'1, 210); 32 – Maddox Monsour – Freshman (5'11, 205); 36 – Callum Early – Sophomore (6'0, 190)	Outfielders: 0 – Jayden Duplantier – Senior (6'0, 200); 6 – Anthony Pack Jr. – Freshman (5'10, 190); 9 – Jonah Williams – Sophomore (6'3, 210) (injured); 17 – Will Hill – Freshman (5'10, 210); 29 – Blake Peterson – (redshirt) Sophomore (6'0, 210); 32 – Maddox Monsour – Freshman (5'11, 205); 42 – Dariyan Pendergrass – (redshirt) Senior (5'10, 165); 43 – Aiden Robbins – Junior (6'2, 205); 44 – Ashton Larson – Junior (6'1, 210); Legend: (S) Suspended; (I) Ineligible; Injured; Redshirt

Roster Notes

=== Starters ===
Lineup
Pos.	No.	Player.	Year
C	8	Carson Tinney	Junior
1B	44	Ashton Larson	Junior
2B	1	Temo Becerra	Senior
3B	31	Casey Borba	Junior
SS	24	Adrian Rodriguez	Sophomore
LF	6	Anthony Pack Jr.	Freshman
CF	42	Dariyan Pendergrass	Senior
RF	43	Aiden Robbins	Junior
DH	5	Ethan Mendoza	Junior

=== Coaches ===
2026 Texas Longhorns coaching staff
- Jim Schlossnagle – Head coach – 2nd year
- Nolan Cain – Associate Head coach/Recruiting Coordinator – 2nd year
- Troy Tulowitzki – Assistant coach/Hitting – 5th year
- Max Weiner – Assistant coach/Pitching – 2nd year

=== Support staff ===
2026 Texas Longhorns support staff
- Drew Bishop – Director of operations – 15th year
- Chuck Box – Director of program development – 2nd year
- Gehrig Mosiello – Director of player development – 2nd year
- Matt Couch – Assistant head coach for athletic performance – 7th year
- Sam Garcia – Assistant athletic trainer – 2nd year

== Offseason ==
=== Departures ===
Offseason departures
Name	Number	Pos.	Height	Weight	Year	Hometown	Notes
Andre Duplantier II	88	P	6'2	235	Senior	Humble, TX	Graduated
Will Mercer	34	P	6'1"	230	Redshirt Senior	Houston, TX	Graduated
Aiden Moffett	32	P	6'3"	230	Senior	Mount Olive, MS	Departed Team
Oliver Santos	49	P	6'4"	208	Sophomore	Newport Beach, CA	Departed Team
Kimble Schuessler	10	C	6'2"	215	Senior	Llano, TX	Graduated
Matthew Scott II	37	OF	6'4"	210	Sophomore	Spring, TX	Departed Team
George Zaharias	47	P	6'3"	220	Sophomore	Menlo Park, CA	Departed Team

==== 2025 MLB Draft ====
Round	Pick	Overall pick	Player	Position	MLB team
2	31	74	Max Belyeu	OF	Colorado Rockies
11	7	322	Jared Spencer	P	Toronto Blue Jays
11	15	330	Jalin Flores	SS	St. Louis Cardinals
13	1	376	Rylan Galvan	C	Chicago White Sox
17	21	516	Grayson Saunier	P	Houston Astros

=== Transfer Portal ===
==== Outgoing transfers ====
Outgoing transfers
Name	No.	Pos.	Height	Weight	Hometown	Year	New school	Source
Cole Chamberlain	52	C	6'2"	215	Novato, CA	Sophomore	Coastal Carolina	
Chance Covert II	57	P	6'2"	200	Austin, TX	Redshirt Freshman	Utah	
Tommy Farmer	43	OF	6'3"	210	Santa Monica, CA	Junior	UC Irvine	
Will Gasparino	8	OF	6'6"	220	Los Angeles, CA	Junior	UCLA	
Carson Luna	36	IF	6'1"	188	Houston, TX	Redshirt Freshman	Michigan	
Bryce Navarre	7	P	6'1"	196	Montgomery, TX	Sophomore	South Carolina	
Cade O'Hara	14	P	6'0"	190	Tustin, CA	Junior	Cal State Fullerton	
Donovan Jordan	19	OF	6'1"	215	Humble, TX	Redshirt Freshman	Missouri	
Drew Rerick	15	P	6'4"	243	Fargo, ND	Sophomore	Oklahoma	
Sam Richardson	50	IF	6'1	220	Olive Branch, MO	Redshirt Freshman	Jacksonville State	
Oliver Service	42	C	6'1"	205	Detroit, MI	Junior	Marshall	
Jaquae Stewart	35	IF	5'10"	227	Sinton, TX	Junior	Texas State	
Easton Tumis	17	P	6'4"	175	Friendswood, TX	Redshirt Sophomore	Kent State	
Ace Whitehead	28	P	5'11"	208	Lampasas, TX	Graduate Student	USC	
Easton Winfield	9	OF	6'0"	205	Alvin, TX	Junior	Houston	

==== Incoming transfers ====
Incoming transfers
Name	B/T	Pos.	Height	Weight	Hometown	Year	Previous school	Source
Temo Becerra	R/R	IF	6'0"	195	Clovis, CA	Redshirt Senior	Stanford	
Callum Early	L/R	IF	6'0"	190	Midlothian, VA	Sophomore	Liberty	
Andrew Ermis	R/R	C	6'1"	210	San Antonio, TX	Junior	Temple College	
Cal Higgins	L/L	P	6'2"	220	Friendswood, TX	Graduate Student	Western Kentucky	
Ashton Larson	L/L	OF	6'1"	210	Overland Park, KS	Junior	LSU	
Haiden Leffew	R/L	P	6'1"	235	Kannapolis, NC	Junior	Wake Forest	
Josh Livingston	L/R	IF	6'0"	215	Prosper, TX	Graduate Student	Wichita State	
Dariyan Pendergrass	L/L	OF	5'10"	165	Hartsville, SC	Redshirt Senior	College of Charleston	
Aiden Robbins	R/R	OF	6'2"	205	Yardley, PA	Junior	Seton Hall	
Carson Tinney	R/R	C	6'4"	240	Castle Pines, CO	Junior	Notre Dame	

=== Recruiting class ===
2025 Texas Recruits
Name	B/T	Pos.	Height	Weight	Hometown	High School
Anthony Pack Jr.	L/L	OF	5'10"	190	Lakewood, CA	Millikan High School
Sam Cozart	R/R	P	6'6"	260	High Point, NC	Wesleyan Christian Academy
Brett Crossland	R/R	P	6'5"	255	Phoenix, AZ	Corona del Sol High School
Cooper Rummel	R/R	P	6'2"	235	Austin, TX	Dripping Springs High School
Jack McKernan	L/L	P	5'11"	205	Missouri City, TX	Ridge Point High School
Brody Walls	R/R	P	6'0"	200	McKinney, TX	McKinney Boyd High School
Kaleb Rogers	R/R	P	5'11"	200	San Antonio, TX	Reagan High School
Grady Westphal	R/R	P	6'2"	200	Leawood, KS	Blue Valley High School
Maddox Monsour	R/R	OF/IF	5'11"	205	Carrollton, GA	Carrollton High School
Will Hill	R/R	OF	5'10"	210	Humble, TX	Summer Creek High School
Michael Winter	R/R	P	6'5	240	Prairie Village, KS	Shawnee Mission East High School
Presley Courville	R/R	C	5'11"	185	Lake Charles, LA	Barbe High School
Jadyn Furgason	R/R	P	6'1"	195	St. Louis, MO	St. John Vianney High School
Jack Paris	R/R	P	6'2"	230	Houston, TX	The Kinkaid School

== Preseason ==
=== SEC coaches poll ===
SEC coaches poll
Predicted finish	Team	Votes (1st place)
1	LSU	231 (9)
2	Texas	214 (1)
3	Mississippi State	205 (4)
4	Arkansas	203 (2)
5	Auburn	175
6	Tennessee	162
7	Florida	156
8	Vanderbilt	151
9	Georgia	133
10	Ole Miss	110
11	Kentucky	99
12	Alabama	87
13	Texas A&M	86
14	Oklahoma	84
15	South Carolina	49
16	Missouri	31

=== Awards and honors ===
==== Preseason SEC awards and honors ====
Preseason All-SEC Team
Player	No.	Position	Class	Designation
Dylan Volantis	99	P	Sophomore	First Team
Carson Tinney	8	C	Junior	Second Team
Ethan Mendoza	5	IF	Junior	Second Team

==== Preseason All-Americans ====
Preseason All-Americans
Player	Position	Selector	Designation
Dylan Volantis	P	D1Baseball	Second Team
Dylan Volantis	P	Perfect Game	First Team
Dylan Volantis	P	NCBWA	First Team
Carson Tinney	C	D1Baseball	Third Team
Carson Tinney	C	Perfect Game	Second Team
Carson Tinney	C	Baseball America	Third Team
Carson Tinney	C	NCBWA	First Team
Aiden Robbins	OF	D1Baseball	Third Team
Aiden Robbins	OF	Perfect Game	Second Team
Aiden Robbins	OF	NCBWA	Third Team
Thomas Burns	P	Baseball America	Third Team
Cal Higgins	P	NCBWA	First Team
Josh Livingston	IF	NCBWA	Fourth Team

== Schedule and results ==
2026 Texas Longhorns baseball game log
(Overall: 46–15; Conference: 19–10); (Home: 34–4; Away: 8–8; Neutral: 4–3)
Regular season (40–12)
February (10–0)
(Home: 8–0; Away: 0–0; Neutral: 2–0)

Date	Time (CST)	Opponent	Rank	TV	Venue	Score	Win	Loss	Save	Attendance	Overall record	SEC record
February 13	6:30 p.m.	UC Davis*	#3	SECN+	UFCU Disch–Falk Field • Austin, Texas	**W** 12–2^{(7)}	**Riojas** (1–0)	Valdez (0–1)	—	7,649	1–0	—
February 14	6:30 p.m.	UC Davis*	#3	SECN+	UFCU Disch–Falk Field • Austin, Texas	**W** 6–4	**Harrison** (1–0)	Wood (0–1)	**Hamilton** (1)	6,570	2–0	—
February 15	12:00 p.m.	UC Davis*	#3	SECN+	UFCU Disch–Falk Field • Austin, Texas	**W** 9–1	**Volantis** (1–0)	Speights (0–1)	—	7,056	3–0	—
February 17	5:00 p.m.	Lamar*	#3	SECN+	UFCU Disch–Falk Field • Austin, Texas	**W** 14–4^{(7)}	**Cozart** (1–0)	Shimmin (0–1)	—	6,516	4–0	—
February 20	6:30 p.m.	Michigan State*	#3	SECN+	UFCU Disch–Falk Field • Austin, Texas	**W** 8–1	**Riojas** (2–0)	Donovan (0–1)	—	7,808	5–0	—
February 21	2:00 p.m.	Michigan State*	#3	SECN+	UFCU Disch–Falk Field • Austin, Texas	**W** 3–1	**Grubbs** (1–0)	Monke (0–1)	**Burns** (1)	7,397	6–0	—
February 22	12:00 p.m.	Michigan State*	#3	SECN+	UFCU Disch–Falk Field • Austin, Texas	**W** 4–0	**Volantis** (2–0)	Pikur (0–2)	—	6,870	7–0	—
February 24	6:30 p.m.	UTRGV*	#3	SECN+	UFCU Disch–Falk Field • Austin, Texas	**W** 14–0^{(7)}	**Cozart** (2–0)	Vercoe (0–2)	—	6,790	8–0	—
BRUCE BOLT College Classic
February 27	8:05 p.m.	vs #9 Coastal Carolina*	#3	YouTube	Daikin Park • Houston, Texas	**W** 8–1	**Riojas** (3–0)	Jones (0–1)	—	13,427	9–0	—
February 28	7:35 p.m.	vs Baylor*	#3	YouTube	Daikin Park • Houston, Texas	**W** 5–2	**Grubbs** (2–0)	Calder (0–1)	**Burns** (2)	9,531	10–0	—

March (14–4)
(Home: 10–2; Away: 3–2; Neutral: 1–0)

Date	Time (CST)	Opponent	Rank	TV	Venue	Score	Win	Loss	Save	Attendance	Overall record	SEC record
March 1	2:00 p.m.	vs Ohio State*	#3	YouTube	Daikin Park • Houston, Texas	**W** 10–3	**Crossland** (1–0)	Herrenbruck (1–1)	—	6,525	11–0	—
March 3	6:30 p.m.	Houston Christian*	#3	SECN+	UFCU Disch–Falk Field • Austin, Texas	**W** 16–3^{(7)}	**Cozart** (3–0)	Elarton (0–1)	—	6,793	12–0	—
March 6	6:30 p.m.	USC Upstate*	#3	SECN+	UFCU Disch–Falk Field • Austin, Texas	**W** 14–2^{(8)}	**Riojas** (4–0)	Torres (0–2)	—	7,500	13–0	—
March 7	4:00 p.m.	USC Upstate*	#3	SECN+	UFCU Disch–Falk Field • Austin, Texas	**W** 11–9	**Leffew** (1–0)	Kummer (1–1)	**Winter** (1)	6,671	14–0	—
March 8	12:00 p.m.	USC Upstate*	#3	SECN+	UFCU Disch–Falk Field • Austin, Texas	**W** 13–3^{(8)}	**Winter** (1–0)	Bianchini (1–2)	—	6,676	15–0	—
March 10	6:00 p.m.	at Texas State*	#2	ESPN+	Bobcat Ballpark • San Marcos, Texas	**W** 15–4	**Walker** (1–0)	Targac (1–3)	—	3,482	16–0	—
March 13	6:30 p.m.	Ole Miss	#2	SECN+	UFCU Disch–Falk Field • Austin, Texas	**L** 8–9^{(11)}	Rabe (3–0)	**Crossland** (1–1)	Waters (1)	7,789	16–1	0–1
March 14	2:30 p.m.	Ole Miss	#2	SECN+	UFCU Disch–Falk Field • Austin, Texas	**W** 11–2	**Harrison** (2–0)	Gibson (1–1)	—	7,830	17–1	1–1
March 15	1:00 p.m.	Ole Miss	#2	SECN+	UFCU Disch–Falk Field • Austin, Texas	**W** 8–2	**Volantis** (3–0)	Libbert (2–2)	**Cozart** (1)	7,579	18–1	2–1
March 17	6:30 p.m.	Tarleton State*	#2	SECN+	UFCU Disch–Falk Field • Austin, Texas	**L** 1–6	Jaques (3–0)	**Bing** (0–1)	—	6,915	18–2	—
March 20	6:00 p.m.	at #5 Auburn	#2	SECN+	Plainsman Park • Auburn, Alabama	**L** 3–4	Brewer (1–1)	**Walker** (1–1)	—	7,247	18–3	2–2
March 21	6:00 p.m.	at #5 Auburn	#2	SECN+	Plainsman Park • Auburn, Alabama	**W** 7–6	**Harrison** (3–0)	Sanders (2–1)	**Burns** (3)	8,037	19–3	3–2
March 22	2:00 p.m.	at #5 Auburn	#2	SECN+	Plainsman Park • Auburn, Alabama	**W** 5–0	**Cozart** (4–0)	Petrovic (4–1)	—	7,011	20–3	4–2
March 24	6:30 p.m.	at Houston*	#2	ESPN+	Schroeder Park • Houston, Texas	**L** 7–9	Boushele (1–0)	**Higgins** (0–1)	Rodriguez (2)	2,285	20–4	—
March 26	7:00 p.m.	#8 Oklahoma	#2	SECN	UFCU Disch–Falk Field • Austin, Texas	**W** 14–0^{(7)}	**Riojas** (5–0)	Mercurius (5–2)	—	7,358	21–4	5–2
March 27	7:00 p.m.	#8 Oklahoma	#2	SECN	UFCU Disch–Falk Field • Austin, Texas	**W** 4–3^{(10)}	**Cozart** (5–0)	Cleveland (2–1)	—	7,990	22–4	6–2
March 28	4:00 p.m.	#8 Oklahoma	#2	SECN	UFCU Disch–Falk Field • Austin, Texas	**W** 5–4^{(10)}	**Leffew** (2–0)	Bodin (3–1)	—	8,059	23–4	7–2
March 31	6:30 p.m.	Texas State*	#2	SECN+	UFCU Disch–Falk Field • Austin, Texas	**W** 10–8	**Walls** (1–0)	Timmins (0–1)	**Cozart** (2)	7,765	24–4	—

April (9–5)
(Home; 5–1; Away: 4–4)

Date	Time (CST)	Opponent	Rank	TV	Venue	Score	Win	Loss	Save	Attendance	Overall record	SEC record
April 2	6:00 p.m.	at South Carolina	#2	SECN	Founders Park • Columbia, South Carolina	**L** 1–9	Russell (3–0)	**Riojas** (5–1)	Philpott (1)	6,657	24–5	7–3
April 3	6:00 p.m.	at South Carolina	#2	SECN+	Founders Park • Columbia, South Carolina	**W** 5–3	**Harrison** (4–0)	Gunther (2–3)	**Cozart** (3)	6,609	25–5	8–3
April 4	1:00 p.m.	at South Carolina	#2	SECN+	Founders Park • Columbia, South Carolina	**W** 4–1	**Volantis** (4–0)	Phillips (2–4)	**Cozart** (4)	7,025	26–5	9–3
April 7	6:30 p.m.	Incarnate Word*	#2	SECN+	UFCU Disch–Falk Field • Austin, Texas	**W** 16–4^{(7)}	**Hamilton** (1–0)	Foley (0–2)	—	6,979	27–5	—
April 10	7:00 p.m.	at #18 Texas A&M; Lone Star Showdown	#2	SECN	Blue Bell Park • College Station, Texas	**L** 8–9	Darden (3–0)	**Leffew** (2–1)	Freshcorn (7)	7,664	27–6	9–4
April 11	2:00 p.m.	at #18 Texas A&M; Lone Star Showdown	#2	ESPN2	Blue Bell Park • College Station, Texas	**L** 4–11	Lyons (5–0)	**Harrison** (4–1)	—	7,812	27–7	9–5
April 12	1:00 p.m.	at #18 Texas A&M; Lone Star Showdown	#2	SECN+	Blue Bell Park • College Station, Texas	**Canceled** (Note: April 12th game canceled after a lengthy weather delay due to inclement weather.)						
April 14	6:30 p.m.	Texas A&M–Corpus Christi*	#4	SECN+	UFCU Disch–Falk Field • Austin, Texas	**W** 14–7	**Hamilton** (2–0)	Fowler (1–2)	—	6,726	28–7	—
April 17	6:30 p.m.	#11 Alabama	#4	SECN+	UFCU Disch–Falk Field • Austin, Texas	**W** 10–2	**Volantis** (5–0)	Fay (6–3)	**Cozart** (5)	7,547	29–7	10–5
April 18	2:00 p.m.	#11 Alabama	#4	SECN+	UFCU Disch–Falk Field • Austin, Texas	**W** 3–1	**Leffew** (3–1)	Heiberger (2–2)	**Cozart** (6)	6,878	30–7	11–5
April 19	1:00 p.m.	#11 Alabama	#4	SECN+	UFCU Disch–Falk Field • Austin, Texas	**L** 1–2	Upchurch (5–2)	**Harrison** (4–2)	Crowther (1)	7,223	30–8	11–6
April 21	6:30 p.m.	Air Force*	#4	SECN+	UFCU Disch–Falk Field • Austin, Texas	**Canceled** (Note: April 21st game canceled due to inclement weather.)						
April 24	6:00 p.m.	at Vanderbilt	#4	SECN+	Hawkins Field • Nashville, Tennessee	**W** 11–4	**Volantis** (6–0)	Fennell (3–2)	—	3,442	31–8	12–6
April 25	7:00 p.m.	at Vanderbilt	#4	SECN	Hawkins Field • Nashville, Tennessee	**L** 0–6	Guth (2–1)	**Riojas** (5–2)	Baird (5)	3,442	31–9	12–7
April 26	12:00 p.m.	at Vanderbilt	#4	ESPN2	Hawkins Field • Nashville, Tennessee	**W** 4–3^{(10)}	**Cozart** (6–0)	Baird (0–3)	—	3,442	32–9	13–7
April 28	6:30 p.m.	Sam Houston*	#4	SECN+	UFCU Disch–Falk Field • Austin, Texas	**W** 15–14	**Bing** (1–1)	Kendrick (1–2)	—	6,814	33–9	—

May (7–3)
(Home; 6–1; Away: 1–2)

Date	Time (CST)	Opponent	Rank	TV	Venue	Score	Win	Loss	Save	Attendance	Overall record	SEC record
May 1	7:30 p.m. (Note: Start time for May 1st game pushed back to 7:30 p.m. from 6:30 p.m. due to inclement weather.)	#10 Mississippi State	#4	SECN+	UFCU Disch–Falk Field • Austin, Texas	**W** 3–1	**Volantis** (7–0)	Valincius (7–2)	**Cozart** (7)	6,747	34–9	14–7
May 2	2:30 p.m.	#10 Mississippi State	#4	SECN+	UFCU Disch–Falk Field • Austin, Texas	**L** 4–7	Bauer (4–0)	**Crossland** (1–2)	—	7,536	34–10	14–8
May 3	1:00 p.m.	#10 Mississippi State	#4	ESPN	UFCU Disch–Falk Field • Austin, Texas	**W** 11–6	**Harrison** (5–2)	Gleason (3–1)	—	7,481	35–10	15–8
May 5	6:30 p.m.	UTSA*	#4	SECN+	UFCU Disch–Falk Field • Austin, Texas	**W** 11–8	**Walls** (2–0)	Simmons (7–4)	**Burns** (4)	7,437	36–10	—
May 8	5:30 p.m.	at Tennessee	#4	SECN+	Lindsey Nelson Stadium • Knoxville, Tennessee	**L** 1–5	Kuhns (4–4)	**Volantis** (7–1)	—	6,842	36–11	15–9
May 9	5:00 p.m.	at Tennessee	#4	SECN+	Lindsey Nelson Stadium • Knoxville, Tennessee	**L** 9–14	Blanco (6–3)	**Harrison** (5–3)	—	6,842	36–12	15–10
May 10	11:00 a.m.	at Tennessee	#4	ESPN2	Lindsey Nelson Stadium • Knoxville, Tennessee	**W** 13–6	**Leffew** (4–1)	Day (0–1)	—	6,398	37–12	16–10
May 14	6:30 p.m.	Missouri	#6	SECN+	UFCU Disch–Falk Field • Austin, Texas	**W** 6–3	**Volantis** (8–1)	Bjorn (0–1)	**Cozart** (8)	7,334	38–12	17–10
May 15	6:30 p.m.	Missouri	#6	SECN+	UFCU Disch–Falk Field • Austin, Texas	**W** 11–6	**Harrison** (6–3)	Kehlenbrink (3–9)	—	7,472	39–12	18–10
May 16	2:00 p.m.	Missouri	#6	SECN+	UFCU Disch–Falk Field • Austin, Texas	**W** 12–7	**Higgins** (1–1)	Villarreal (2–2)	—	7,277	40–12	19–10

Postseason (6–3)
SEC Tournament (0–1)

Date	Time (CST)	Opponent	Rank	TV	Venue	Score	Win	Loss	Save	Attendance	Overall record	Tournament record
May 22	4:30 p.m.	vs. #12 (7) Arkansas; Quarterfinal	#5 (2)	SECN	Hoover Metropolitan Stadium • Hoover, Alabama	**L** 1–8	Gaeckle (4–3)	**Howard** (0–1)	—	13,105	40–13	0–1

NCAA Austin Regional (3–0)

Date	Time (CST)	Opponent	Rank	TV	Venue	Score	Win	Loss	Save	Attendance	Overall record	Regional record
May 29	12:00 p.m.	(4) Holy Cross	#6 (1)	SECN	UFCU Disch–Falk Field • Austin, Texas	**W** 19–1	**Howard** (1–1)	Wywoda (6–5)	—	7,585	41–13	1–0
May 30	6:00 p.m.	(3) Tarleton State	#6 (1)	ESPN+	UFCU Disch–Falk Field • Austin, Texas	**W** 16–2	**Volantis** (9–1)	Wendel (6–4)	—	8,276	42–13	2–0
May 31	5:00 p.m.	(2) UC Santa Barbara; Regional Final	#6 (1)	ESPN+	UFCU Disch–Falk Field • Austin, Texas	**W** 6–4	**Burns** (1–0)	Froling (2–3)	**Harrison** (1)	7,884	43–13	3–0

NCAA Austin Super Regional (2–0)

Date	Time (CST)	Opponent	Rank	TV	Venue	Score	Win	Loss	Save	Attendance	Overall record	Super Regional record
June 6	7:00 p.m.	#15 (11) Oregon	#6 (6)	ESPN	UFCU Disch–Falk Field • Austin, Texas	**W** 11–3	**Volantis** (10–1)	Scolari (5–1)	—	8,550	44–13	1–0
June 7	8:00 p.m.	#15 (11) Oregon	#6 (6)	ESPN	UFCU Disch–Falk Field • Austin, Texas	**W** 6–5	**Burns** (2–0)	Bell (2–7)	**Cozart** (9)	8,465	45–13	2–0

College World Series (1–2)

Date	Time (CST)	Opponent	Rank	TV	Venue	Score	Win	Loss	Save	Attendance	Overall record	CWS record
June 13	7:00 p.m.	vs. #3 (3) Georgia	#6 (6)	ESPN	Charles Schwab Field Omaha • Omaha, NE	**L** 1–7	Volchko (11–2)	**Volantis** (10–2)	—	25,002	45–14	0–1
June 15	1:00 p.m.	vs. #16 (7) Alabama	#6 (6)	ESPN	Charles Schwab Field Omaha • Omaha, NE	**W** 14–2	**Riojas** (6–2)	Adams (8–5)	—	22,687	46–14	1–1
June 16	7:00 p.m.	vs. #3 (3) Georgia	#6 (6)	ESPN	Charles Schwab Field Omaha • Omaha, NE	**L** 0–2	Byrd (6–2)	**Harrison** (6–4)	—	24,324	46–15	1–2

"#" represents ranking. All rankings from D1 Baseball Poll on the date of the contest.
"()" represents postseason seeding in the SEC Tournament or NCAA Regional, respectively.
= Win, = Loss, = Canceled/Postponed
Bold = **Texas Longhorns team member**
* = Non-Conference Game
Schedule Source:

Schedule Notes:

=== Postseason ===
==== SEC Tournament ====
**First round** May 19; SEC Network
9	Ole Miss	8
**16**	**Missouri**	**10**
**12**	**Vanderbilt**	**8**
13	Kentucky	5
**10**	**Tennessee**	**11**
15	South Carolina	6
11	Oklahoma	2
**14**	**LSU**	**6**

**Second round** May 20; SEC Network
**8**	**Mississippi State**	**12^{7}**
16	Missouri	2
**5**	**Florida**	**8**
12	Vanderbilt	3
**7**	**Arkansas**	**8**
10	Tennessee	4
**6**	**Auburn**	**3**
14	LSU	1

**Quarterfinals**; May 21 & 22; SEC Network
**1**	**Georgia**	**5**
8	Mississippi State	3
4	Alabama	3
**5**	**Florida**	**13^{8}**
2	Texas	1
**7**	**Arkansas**	**8**
3	Texas A&M	0
**6**	**Auburn**	**7**

**Semifinals**; May 23; SEC Network
**1**	**Georgia**	**8**
5	Florida	7
**7**	**Arkansas**	**2**
6	Auburn	1

**Championship**; May 24; SEC Network
**1**	**Georgia**	**11^{7}**
7	Arkansas	1

==== NCAA Tournament ====
===== Austin Regional and Super Regional =====
Hosted by Texas at UFCU Disch–Falk Field

Regional	Regional
**1**	**Texas**	**19**
4	Holy Cross	1
**1**	**Texas**	**16**
3	Tarleton State	2
**3**	**Tarleton State**	**11**
2	UC Santa Barbara	5
Austin Regional – UFCU Disch–Falk Field
4	Holy Cross	1
**2**	**UC Santa Barbara**	**15**
**2**	**UC Santa Barbara**	**9**
3	Tarleton State	5
**1**	**Oregon**	**14**
4	Yale	2
**1**	**Oregon**	**4**
3	Washington State	0
**3**	**Washington State**	**3**
2	Oregon State	2
Eugene Regional – PK Park
4	Yale	2
**2**	**Oregon State**	**9**
**2**	**Oregon State**	**10**
3	Washington State	1

Regional Final
**1**	**Texas**	**6**	–
2	UC Santa Barbara	4	–
**1**	**Oregon**	**4**	–
2	Oregon State	1	–

Super Regional; June 6–8
**6**	**Texas**	**11**	**6**	–
11	Oregon	3	5	–

===== College World Series =====
First round	Second round
**16**	**West Virginia**	**7**
Troy	5
16	West Virginia	2
**5**	**North Carolina**	**5**
**5**	**North Carolina**	**6**
Ole Miss	2
Bracket 1
**Troy**	**12**
Ole Miss	8
Troy	0
**16**	**West Virginia**	**12**
**Oklahoma**	**9**
7	Alabama	0
**Oklahoma**	**4**
3	Georgia	3
**3**	**Georgia**	**7**
6	Texas	1
Bracket 2
7	Alabama	2
**6**	**Texas**	**14**
6	Texas	0
**3**	**Georgia**	**2**

Semifinals
**5**	**North Carolina**	**12**	–
16	West Virginia	7	–
**Oklahoma**	**11**	–
3	Georgia	4	–

Finals
5	North Carolina	3	**6**	2
**Oklahoma**	**9**	2	**13**

== Awards and honors ==
=== National awards and honors ===
National Yearly honors
Honors	Player	Position	Date Awarded	Ref.
NCBWA Stopper of the Year (Note: Awarded to the nation's top relief pitcher.)	Sam Cozart (Note: Awarded Perfect Game Co-Freshman Pitcher of the Year along with North Carolina's Caden Glauber.)	P	June 12, 2026	
NCBWA Freshman Pitcher of the Year	Sam Cozart	P	June 9, 2026	
Perfect Game Freshman Pitcher of the Year	Sam Cozart	P	June 9, 2026	
Rawlings Gold Glove	Carson Tinney	C	June 17, 2026	
D1 Baseball All-America First Team	Dylan Volantis	P	June 25, 2026	
D1 Baseball All-America First Team	Sam Cozart	P	June 25, 2026	
D1 Baseball All-America Third Team	Carson Tinney	C	June 25, 2026	
D1 Baseball All-America Third Team	Aiden Robbins	OF	June 25, 2026	
Baseball America All-America First Team	Dylan Volantis	P	June 12, 2026	
Baseball America All-America First Team	Sam Cozart	P	June 12, 2026	
Baseball America All-America First Team	Aiden Robbins	OF	June 12, 2026	
Baseball America All-America Third Team	Anthony Pack Jr.	OF	June 12, 2026	
Perfect Game All-America First Team	Dylan Volantis	P	June 10, 2026	
Perfect Game All-America First Team	Sam Cozart	P	June 10, 2026	
Perfect Game All-America Third Team	Aiden Robbins	OF	June 10, 2026	
NCBWA All-America First Team	Dylan Volantis	P	June 10, 2026	
NCBWA All-America First Team	Sam Cozart	P	June 10, 2026	
NCBWA All-America First Team	Aiden Robbins	OF	June 10, 2026	
NCBWA All-America Third Team	Carson Tinney	C	June 10, 2026	
Baseball America Freshman All-America First Team	Anthony Pack Jr.	OF	June 25, 2026	
Baseball America Freshman All-America First Team	Sam Cozart	P	June 25, 2026	
Perfect Game Freshman All-America First Team	Anthony Pack Jr.	OF	June 11, 2026	
Perfect Game Freshman All-America First Team	Sam Cozart	P	June 11, 2026	
NCBWA Freshman All-America First Team	Anthony Pack Jr.	OF	June 8, 2026	
NCBWA Freshman All-America First Team	Sam Cozart	P	June 8, 2026	

=== SEC awards and honors ===
SEC Yearly honors
Honors	Player	Position	Date Awarded	Ref.
SEC Freshman of the Year	Anthony Pack Jr.	OF	May 18, 2026	
SEC Newcomber of the Year	Aiden Robbins	OF	May 18, 2026	
All-SEC First Team	Dylan Volantis	P	May 18, 2026	
All-SEC First Team	Sam Cozart	P	May 18, 2026	
All-SEC First Team	Aiden Robbins	OF	May 18, 2026	
All-SEC Second Team	Carson Tinney	C	May 18, 2026	
All-SEC Second Team	Anthony Pack Jr.	OF	May 18, 2026	
All-SEC Freshman Team	Sam Cozart	P	May 18, 2026	
All-SEC Freshman Team	Anthony Pack Jr.	OF	May 18, 2026	

SEC Weekly honors
Honors	Player	Position	Date Awarded	Ref.
SEC Freshman of the Week	Sam Cozart	P	March 9, 2026	
SEC Pitcher of the Week	Ruger Riojas (Note: Awarded SEC Co-Pitcher of the Week along with Florida's Jackson Barberi.)	P	March 30, 2026	
SEC Freshman of the Week	Anthony Pack Jr. (Note: Awarded SEC Co-Freshman of the Week along with Missouri's Blaize Ward.)	OF	April 6, 2026	
SEC Freshman of the Week	Sam Cozart (Note: Awarded SEC Co-Freshman of the Week along with Auburn's Mason McCraine.)	P	April 20, 2026	
SEC Pitcher of the Week	Dylan Volantis (Note: Awarded SEC Co-Pitcher of the Week along with LSU's Zac Cowan.)	P	May 4, 2026	

Award notes:

== Record vs. conference opponents ==
Blank are not scheduled. Blue are home games, otherwise away.

2026 SEC baseball records Source: 2026 SEC baseball game results, 2026 SEC baseball schedule
Tm	W–L	ALA	ARK	AUB	FLA	UGA	KEN	LSU	MSU	MIZ	OKL	OMS	SCA	TEN	TEX	TAM	VAN	Tm	SR	SW
ALA	18–12		0–3	3–0	3–0	.	0–3	.	.	.	2–1	2–1	3–0	1–2	1–2	.	3–0	ALA	6–4	4–2
ARK	17–13	3–0		1–2	0–3	1–2	2–1	.	2–1	2–1	2–1	2–1	2–1	.	.	.	.	ARK	7–3	1–1
AUB	17–13	0–3	2–1		2–1	1–2	2–1	.	2–1	3–0	2–1	.	.	.	1–2	2–1	.	AUB	7–3	1–1
FLA	18–12	0–3	3–0	1–2		2–1	2–1	3–0	.	.	2–1	1–2	3–0	.	.	1–2	.	FLA	6–4	3–1
UGA	23–7	.	2–1	2–1	1–2		.	3–0	3–0	3–0	.	2–1	3–0	2–1	.	2–1	.	UGA	9–1	4–0
KEN	13–17	3–0	1–2	1–2	1–2	.		1–2	.	1–2	.	1–2	1–2	2–1	.	.	1–2	KEN	2–8	1–0
LSU	9–21	.	.	.	0–3	0–3	2–1		0–3	.	1–2	0–3	3–0	2–1	.	0–3	1–2	LSU	3–7	1–5
MSU	16–14	.	1–2	1–2	.	0–3	.	3–0		.	.	3–0	3–0	0–3	1–2	1–2	3–0	MSU	4–6	4–2
MIZ	6–24	.	1–2	0–3	.	0–3	2–1	.	.		0–3	.	0–3	1–2	0–3	0–3	2–1	MIZ	2–8	0–6
OKL	14–16	1–2	1–2	1–2	1–2	.	.	2–1	.	3–0		.	.	1–2	0–3	2–1	2–1	OKL	4–6	1–1
OMS	15–15	1–2	1–2	.	2–1	1–2	2–1	3–0	0–3	.	.		.	2–1	1–2	2–1	.	OMS	5–5	1–1
SCA	7–23	0–3	1–2	.	0–3	0–3	2–1	0–3	0–3	3–0	.	.		.	1–2	.	0–3	SCA	2–8	1–6
TEN	15–15	2–1	.	.	.	1–2	1–2	1–2	3–0	2–1	2–1	1–2	.		2–1	.	0–3	TEN	5–5	1–1
TEX	19–10	2–1	.	2–1	.	.	.	.	2–1	3–0	3–0	2–1	2–1	1–2		0–2	2–1	TEX	8–2	2–0
TAM	18–11	.	.	1–2	2–1	1–2	.	3–0	2–1	3–0	1–2	1–2	.	.	2–0		2–1	TAM	6–4	2–0
VAN	14–16	0–3	.	.	.	.	2–1	2–1	0–3	1–2	1–2	.	3–0	3–0	1–2	1–2		VAN	4–6	2–2
Tm	W–L	ALA	ARK	AUB	FLA	UGA	KEN	LSU	MSU	MIZ	OKL	OMS	SCA	TEN	TEX	TAM	VAN	Team	SR	SW

Updated for entire regular season. Texas at Texas A&M, one game cancelled.
Tie breakers: Alabama over Florida (using head-to-head result), Auburn over Arkansas (using head-to-head result), Ole Miss over Tennessee (using head-to-head result), Oklahoma over Vanderbilt (using head-to-head result).

== Rankings ==
Ranking movements Legend: ██ Increase in ranking ██ Decrease in ranking ( ) = First-place votes
	Week																	
Poll	Pre	1	2	3	4	5	6	7	8	9	10	11	12	13	14	15	16	Final
Coaches'	3	3*	3	3 (5)	2 (7)	2 (4)	2	2	2	4	4	4	4	5	5	5	5*	5
Baseball America	8	7	6	5	3	2	2	2	2	4	3	3	3	6	5	5*	5*	5
NCBWA†	3	2	3	3	2	2	2	2	2	4	4	4	4	7	5	5*	3	5
D1Baseball	3	3	3	3	2	2	2	2	2	4	4	4	4	6	5	6	6*	5
Perfect Game	8	8	6	5	2	2	2	2	3	4	3	4	4	6	5	5*	5*	5

† NCBWA ranks 30 teams in their preseason poll, but only ranks 25 teams weekly during the season.
* A new poll was not released for this week, so for comparison purposes, the previous week's ranking is inserted in this week's slot.
