= Anthony Pack Jr. =

Texas Longhorns – No. 6
- Outfielder
- Born: December 19, 2006 (age 19); Torrance, California
- Bats: Left Throws: Left

Anthony Pack Jr. (born December 19, 2006) is an American college baseball outfielder for the Texas Longhorns.

== Amateur career ==
Pack grew up in Long Beach, California and attended Millikan High School. In addition to baseball, he also played football as a wide receiver up until his sophomore year. He had a .388 batting average as a senior in 2025. He was considered a top prospect for the 2025 Major League Baseball draft but was not selected and instead enrolled at the University of Texas to play college baseball for the Texas Longhorns.

Pack became the Longhorns' starting left fielder as a freshman in 2026. He was named the SEC Baseball Freshman of the Year. He was also named Freshman of the Year by Baseball America. In the 2026 NCAA Division I baseball tournament, Pack hit three home runs in a 19-1 victory over the College of the Holy Cross, making him the first ever Longhorn to hit three home runs in a postseason game. Across a total of 61 games played during his freshman season, Pack slashed .355/.480/.594 with 12 home runs, 56 runs batted in (RBI) and 21 stolen bases. After the season, he was named to the USA Baseball Collegiate National Team.
