= Newsome High School (Florida) =

Joe E. Newsome High School

Location
- 16550 Fishhawk Boulevard; Lithia, Florida 33547; 27.858995°N 82.204455°W

Information
- School type: Public high school
- Founded: 2003
- School district: Hillsborough County Public Schools
- Principal: Katie Rocha
- Staff: 131.00 (FTE)
- Enrollment: 3,340 (2023-2024)
- Student to teacher ratio: 25.00
- Colors: Navy, Carolina blue and white
- Team name: Wolves, Lady Wolves
- Information: (813) 740-4600
- Website: www.hillsboroughschools.org/o/newsome

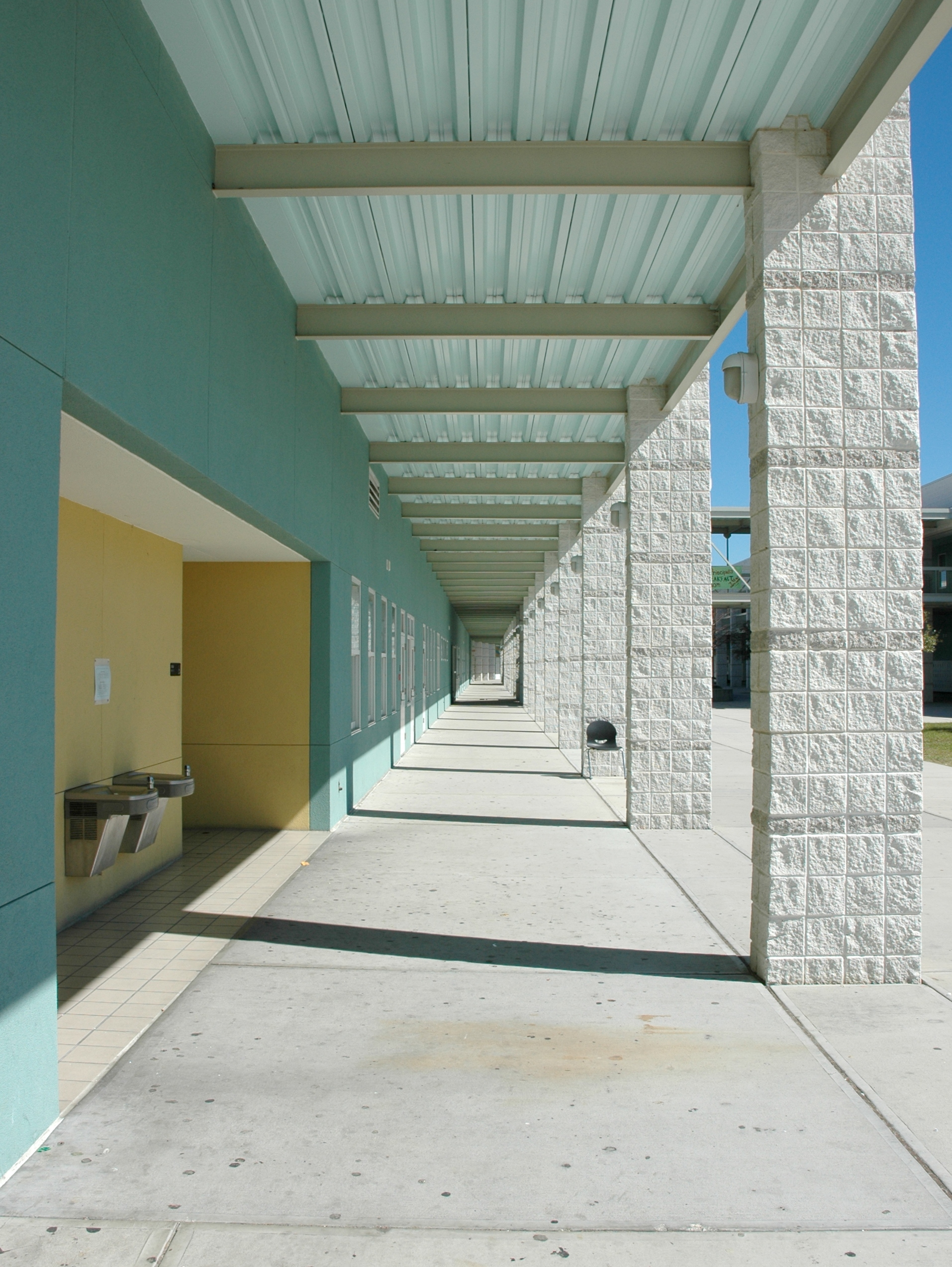
Hallway at Joe E. Newsome High School in 2007

Joe E. Newsome High School is a public high school in Lithia, Florida, United States. Opened in 2003, it is named in honor of Joe E. Newsome, a Plant City pharmacist and also a businessman who served as a board member of the School District of Hillsborough County, Florida for 24 years.

== Demographics ==
As of the 2023–2024 school year Newsome had 3,340 students enrolled. Of these students 6 (0.18%) were American Indian/Alaska Native, 146 (4.37%) Asian, 196 (5.86%) Black, 601 (17.99%) Hispanic, 3 (0.09%) Native Hawaiian/ Pacific Islander, 2,165 (64.82%) White, and 223 (6.67%) were two or more races, 1,700 (50.9%) were male and 1,640 (49.1%) were female.

== Academics ==
As of 2024–25, Newsome offers 23 different Advanced Placement classes.

=== Rankings ===
In 2013, Newsome was judged the best public school in Hillsborough County at educating students for college by Newsweek.

=== Graduation rate ===
In 2012 Newsome's graduation rate was 98% as compared to a statewide rate of 74.5% and a Hillsborough County rate of 72.6%.

== Athletics ==
=== Hockey ===
Newsome won the state hockey championship in 2009 and 2022.As well as the Lightning High School Hockey League in 2022 and 2023.

=== Softball ===
Newsome won the state softball championship in 2015

=== Flag Football ===
Newsome won the 2A state flag football championship in 2021.

== Clubs/Activities ==
The student newspaper is known as Wolf Tracks.

=== Chorus ===
In 2009, the Newsome Chorus captured the Grand Champion Trophy at the Fiesta-Val national competition. In 2016 the chorus performed for the archbishop at Kilkenny Castle, Ireland.

=== Marching Band ===
The Newsome Wolf Pack Marching Band has a history of competitive success. In 2015, the Marching Band's performance of their show "Flight: If Only I Could" won first place at the Bands of America Newark regional at the University of Delaware. They were selected and performed in the 2016 Macy's Thanksgiving Day Parade, the only school in Florida to receive an invitation that year.

In 2024, during their first marching season under director John Owen Davis II, the Wolfpack Marching Band had a regular season clean sweep, being named grand champions earning the top spot at each competition they attended. Newsome Band Program also earned a Straight Superior rating at the annual Florida Bandmasters Association Marching Music Performance Assessment.

=== Winter Guard ===
The Newsome Winter Guard placed 8th and won the Fan Favorite award in the Scholastic A class at the 2018 Winter Guard International Championships.

== Notable people ==
- Ana Cate, soccer player
- Evan Dempsey, baseball player
- Ryan Eckley, football player
- Orlando Greene, Olympic runner, is a coach at Newsome.
- Spencer Shrader, football player.
- Will Worth, football player.
