= Heston Kjerstad =

American baseball player (born 1999)

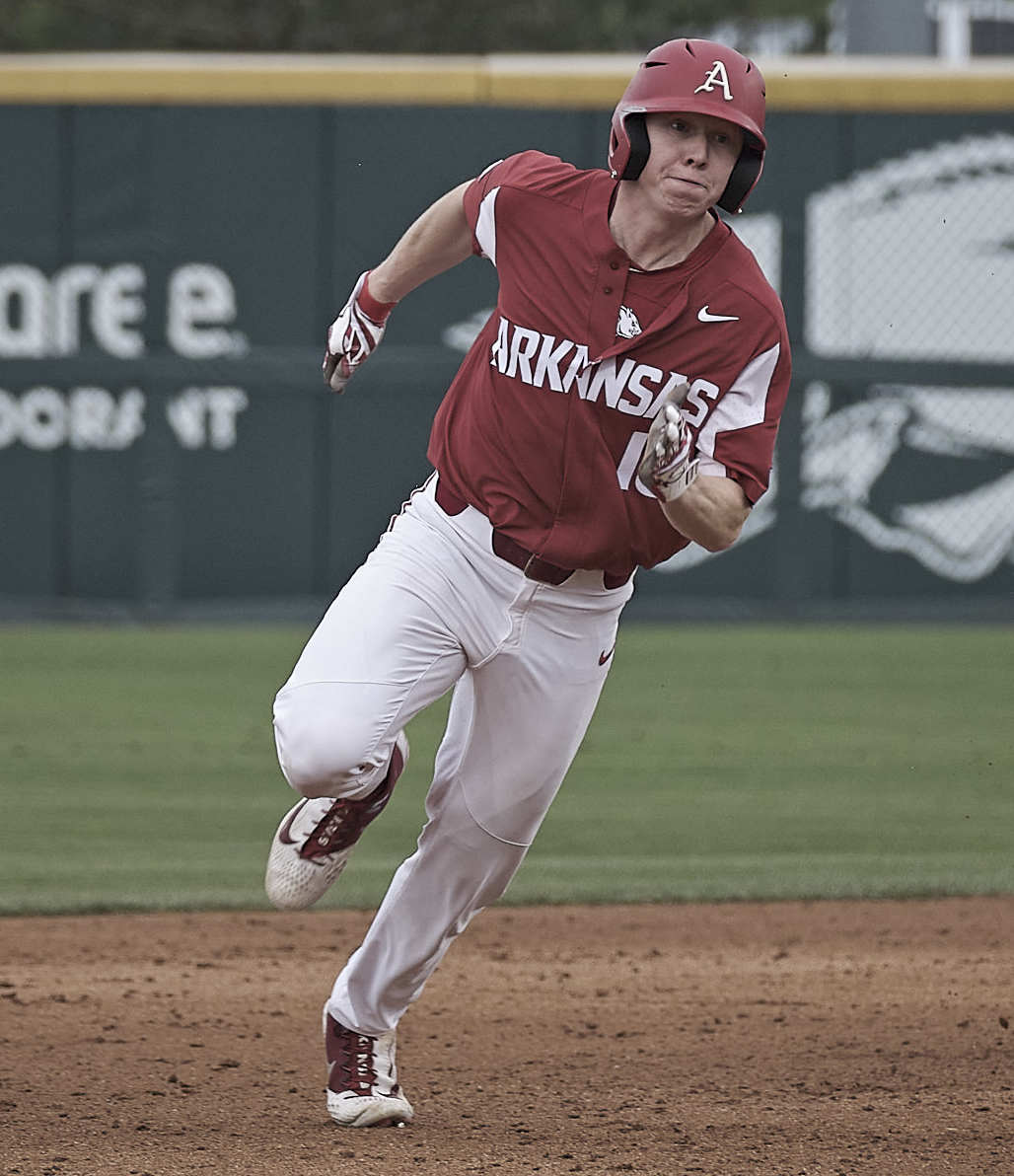
- Kjerstad with the Arkansas Razorbacks in 2019

Free agent
- Outfielder
- Born: February 12, 1999 (age 27); Amarillo, Texas, U.S.
- Bats: Left Throws: Right

MLB debut
- September 14, 2023, for the Baltimore Orioles

MLB statistics (through 2026 season)
- Batting average: .217
- Home runs: 10
- Runs batted in: 38
- Stats at Baseball Reference

Teams
- Baltimore Orioles (2023–2026)

Heston Sawyer Kjerstad (/ˈkərstæd/ KER-stad; born February 12, 1999) is an American professional baseball outfielder who is a free agent. He has previously played Major League Baseball (MLB) for the Baltimore Orioles. The Orioles selected Kjerstad in the first round of the 2020 MLB draft and he made his Major League Baseball (MLB) debut in 2023. His nickname is "Silent J" because of the pronunciation of his surname.

== Amateur career ==
Kjerstad grew up in Amarillo, Texas, and attended Randall High School. As a junior, he batted .477 with 32 runs batted in (RBIs). He was named his district's most valuable player and first team All-State. Kjerstad was named first team All-State and the district's most valuable player again as a senior. The Seattle Mariners selected him in the 36th round of the 2017 Major League Baseball draft, but he opted to play college baseball for the University of Arkansas instead.

As a freshman, Kjerstad was a starting outfielder for the Arkansas Razorbacks. He batted .332 with 30 extra base hits, 14 home runs, 58 RBIs and was named the Southeastern Conference (SEC) Freshman of the Year, second team All-SEC and a freshman All-American by the National Collegiate Baseball Writers Association and the Collegiate Baseball Newspaper. He helped the team to the 2018 College World Series final and was named to the All-Tournament team. As a sophomore, Kjerstad was again named second team All-SEC after batting .327 with 17 home runs and 51 RBIs. During the summer, he played for the Team USA Collegiate National Baseball Team and batted .395 in 14 games.

Kjerstad entered his junior season as a preseason first team All-American selection by Perfect Game and by Collegiate Baseball Newspaper and as a top prospect for the 2020 Major League Baseball draft. He was named the SEC Player of the Week as well as the National Player of the Week by Collegiate Baseball for the first week of the season after going 7 for 13 with four home runs, 10 RBIs and six runs scored in the Razorbacks opening series against Eastern Illinois. Kjerstad batted .448 with six home runs, 20 RBIs and 19 runs scored in 16 games before the season was cut short due to the coronavirus pandemic.

== Professional career ==
The Baltimore Orioles selected Kjerstad in the first round, with the second overall pick, in the 2020 Major League Baseball draft. Kjerstad signed with the Orioles on June 30, 2020, for a $5.2 million bonus. Kjerstad developed myocarditis after signing and missed spring training and all of the 2021 season.

After beginning the 2022 season in extended spring training, Kjerstad made his professional debut on June 10, 2022, for the Single-A Delmarva Shorebirds. In early July, he was promoted to the High-A Aberdeen IronBirds after batting .463 with 37 hits and 17 RBI in 22 games with Delmarva. Kjerstad batted .233/.312/.362 in 163 at-bats in 43 games playing for the IronBirds. Kjerstad played in the 2022 Arizona Fall League, where he batted .371/.400/.663, and led the league in at bats (89) and doubles (9), as he was second in strikeouts (27).

The Orioles invited Kjerstad to spring training in 2023 as a non-roster player; he batted .381 with four home runs in 23 games before being reassigned to minor league camp. Kjerstad began the 2023 season with the Double-A Bowie Baysox and started playing first base in addition to outfield. He hit .310 (57-for-184)/.383/.576 and was among the Eastern League top five in batting average, slugging percentage, on-base plus slugging (OPS), triples, home runs, extra-base hits and hits with the Baysox before his promotion to the Norfolk Tides on June 5. His first Triple-A homer was a leadoff inside-the-parker in the seventh inning of an 8–4 away win over the Scranton/Wilkes-Barre RailRiders four days later on June 9. Kjerstad was selected to play in the 2023 All-Star Futures Game. Kjerstad batted .303 with 21 home runs and 55 RBI in 122 games between the two affiliates.

On September 14, 2023, Kjerstad was selected to the 40-man roster and promoted to the major leagues for the first time following an injury to Ryan Mountcastle. He struck out as a pinch hitter for Jordan Westburg to lead off the eighth inning in a 4–3 loss to the Tampa Bay Rays in his MLB debut later that evening. He got his first MLB hit in a 7–1 loss to the same opponent the following night on September 15 when he ended Zach Eflin's no-hitter attempt with a leadoff homer to right-center in the sixth. In 13 games during his rookie campaign, he batted .233/.281/.467 with two home runs and three RBI.

Kjerstad was optioned to Triple–A Norfolk to begin the 2024 season. He set a single-game Tides record with 10 RBI in a 26–11 away win over the Charlotte Knights on April 3. He went 5-for-7 with a pair of doubles and home runs each and four runs scored. The Orioles promoted Kjerstad to the major leagues on April 23. He went 2-for-14 with two walks and six strikeouts in seven games before returning to the Tides twenty days later on May 13. Five days after his second recall of the campaign on June 24, he hit his first major-league grand slam over the center-field wall off Michael Lorenzen with two outs in the fifth inning of a 6–5 home win over the Texas Rangers on June 29.

Kjerstad entered the 2026 season with the expectation of beginning the year in Triple-A Norfolk. However, he began experiencing right hamstring tightness at the tail end of spring training, causing him to begin the year on the injured list. On May 11, 2026, Kjerstad was transferred to the 60-day injured list. He was activated on May 28, and was optioned to Triple-A Norfolk. In 11 total games for Baltimore, Kjerstad batted .211/.211/.263 with two RBI. On November 2, Kjerstad was designated for assignment by the Orioles; he cleared waivers and was released the same day.
