= Two-way player =

Sports players that can play both defense and offense

In sports that require a player to play on offense and defense (such as basketball and ice hockey), a two-way player refers to a player who excels at both. In sports where a player typically specializes on offense or defense (like American football), or on pitching or batting (like baseball), it refers to a player who chooses to do both.

== Basketball ==
A two-way player in basketball excels at both the offensive side of the game and the defensive side of the game.

Some of the best two-way players in the National Basketball Association (NBA) have been awarded the NBA Defensive Player of the Year Award. Michael Jordan, Hakeem Olajuwon, David Robinson, Kevin Garnett, and Giannis Antetokounmpo are the only Defensive Player of the Year winners to have also won the NBA Most Valuable Player Award (MVP) during their careers. Jordan, Olajuwon, and Antetokounmpo won both awards in the same season.

In the Women's National Basketball Association, Yolanda Griffith, Sheryl Swoopes, Lisa Leslie, Lauren Jackson, Candace Parker, Tamika Catchings, Sylvia Fowles, and A'ja Wilson have won both the WNBA Most Valuable Player Award and the WNBA Defensive Player of the Year Award. Griffith, Swoopes, Leslie, Jackson, and Wilson won both awards in the same year, with Swoopes and Wilson doing so twice.

== Ice hockey ==
In the National Hockey League (NHL), the term two-way forward is used for a forward who handles the defensive aspects of the game as well as the offensive aspects of the game. The best two-way forward is presented with the Frank J. Selke Trophy. The term two-way defenseman is used to describe a defenseman who also makes contributions on offense. Occasionally, a player will be designated as both a defenseman and forward in his career; some recent examples are Nicolas Deslauriers, who was listed as a defenseman in his time in the QMJHL and in his first two professional seasons but as of 2022 is listed as a forward; and Dustin Byfuglien, who began his junior career as a defenseman before being moved up to right wing by the Chicago Blackhawks, then was moved back to defense when he was traded to the Atlanta Thrashers. Brent Burns began at right wing, was switched to defenseman, back to right wing for a year and then back to defenseman.

Only two players have won both the Hart Trophy (the NHL's MVP award) and the Norris Trophy (the best defenseman award): Bobby Orr three times and Chris Pronger once, each time in the same season.

== Baseball ==
=== Background ===
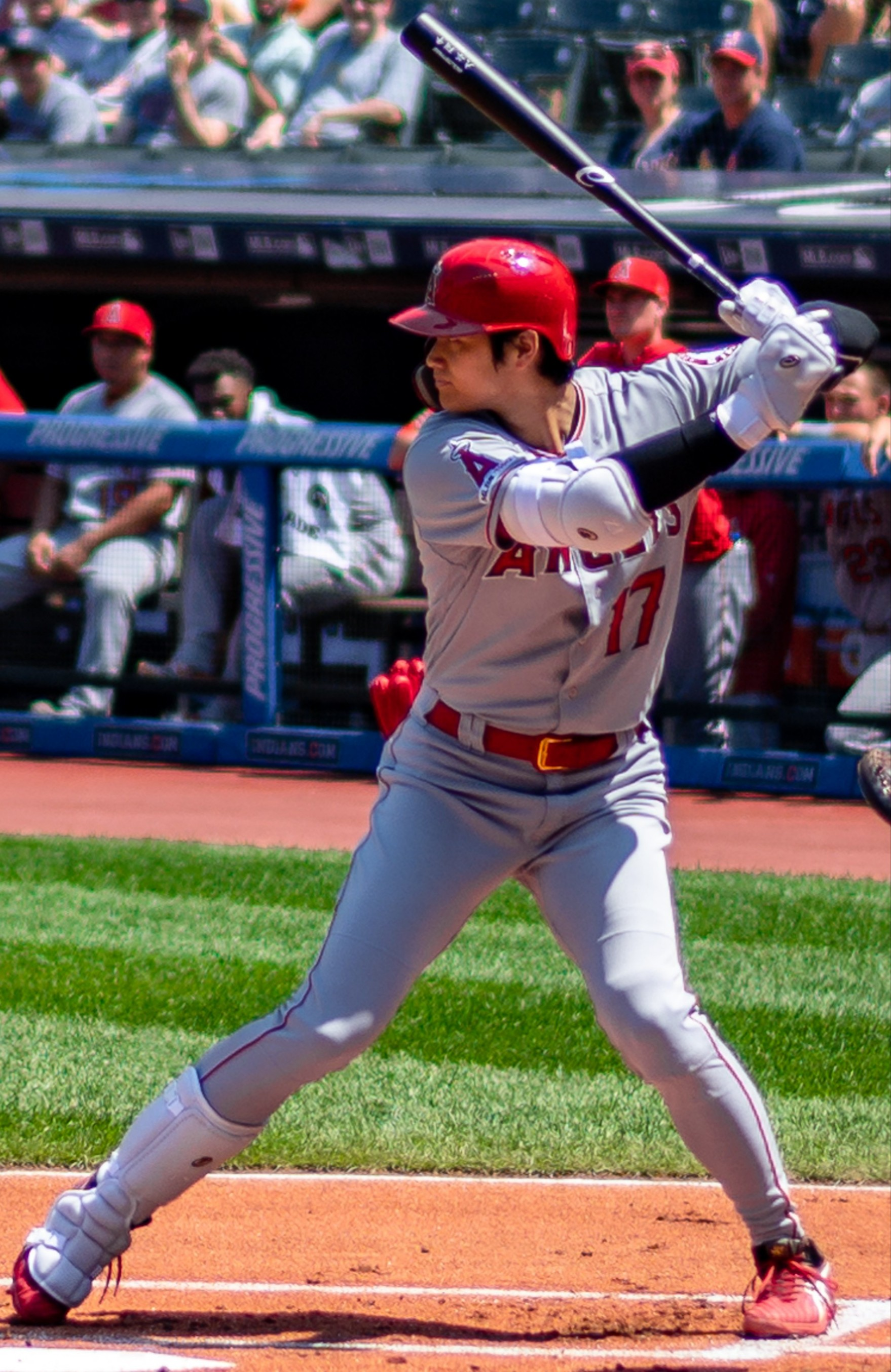
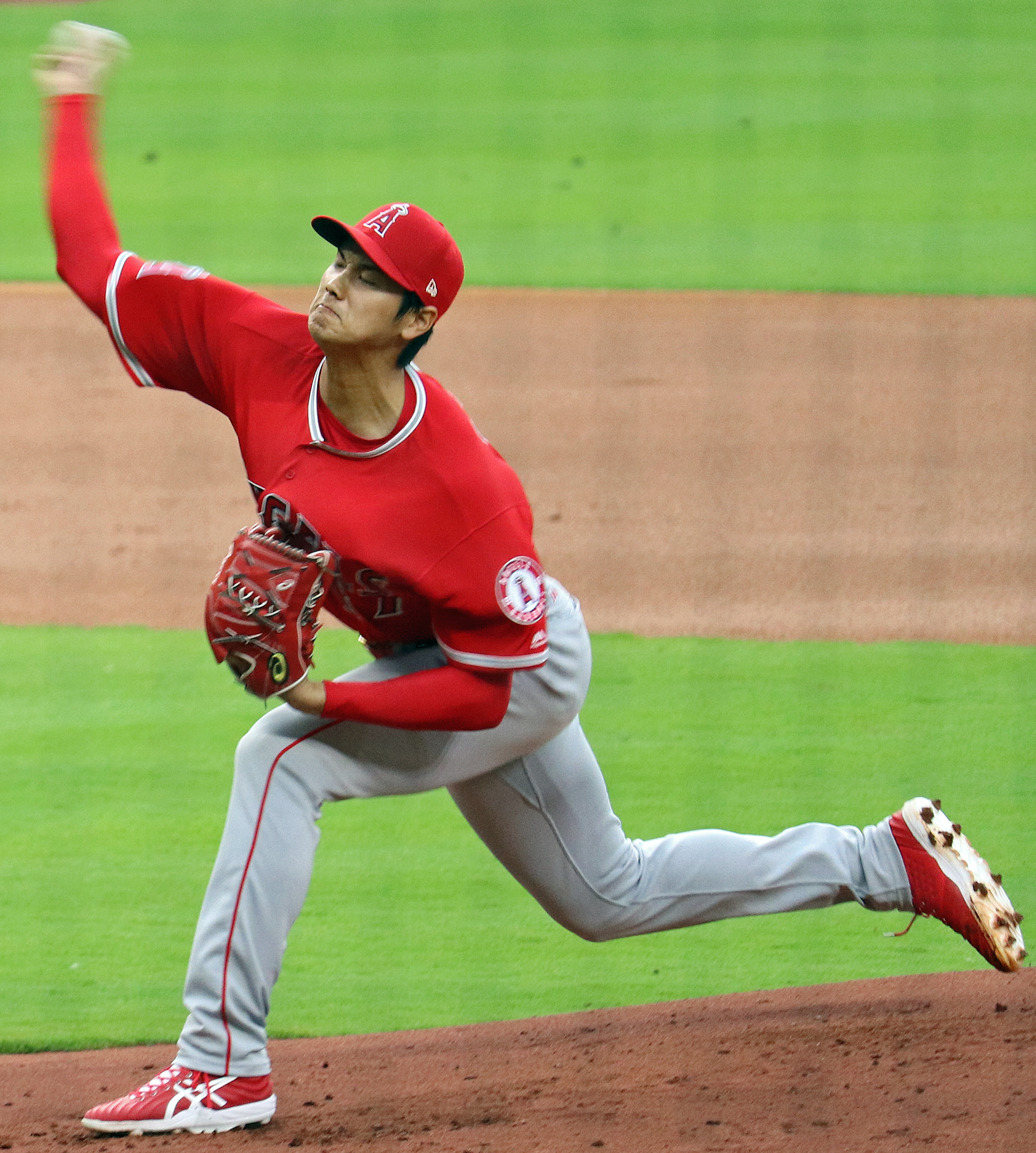
Shohei Ohtani with the Los Angeles Angels

In Major League Baseball (MLB), there are few true two-way players, as most pitchers are poor batters, and position players generally do not also pitch. In the American League especially, the two-way player had mostly ceased to exist, as the designated hitter (DH) rule has allowed a team to have a designated batter bat in place of the pitcher since 1973. This rule was what largely made it possible for two-way player Shohei Ohtani to pitch and bat on separate days. Until 2022 (when the DH rule was made universal for all of MLB), pitchers in the National League still had to bat for themselves, but they were usually poor batters. In 2017, the average batting average for pitchers was .124, significantly worse than the league average of .255.

Until Shohei Ohtani in 2021, Bullet Rogan, a player in the Negro baseball leagues, was the last player to pitch 100 innings and have 200 plate appearances as a batter in the same season in MLB, most recently in 1928 (and Babe Ruth in 1919 was the last player before Ohtani in the National or American Leagues to do so).

Two-way players are still common in college baseball, with the John Olerud Award being given to the best two-way player of the season. However, by the major league level, a player is usually better at either pitching or batting, and rarely is given the chance to do both.

Effective with the 2020 season, "two-way player" became an official MLB roster classification. A player qualifies once he reaches the following statistical milestones in either the current or either of the two previous seasons:

- At least 20 MLB innings pitched.
- Appearing in at least 20 MLB games as a position player or designated hitter, with at least 3 plate appearances in each of the 20 games.

Once the player qualifies, he retains two-way status for the remainder of the current season plus all of the next two seasons. Two-way players do not count against the limit of 13 pitchers (14 for regular-season games after September 1) on a team's active roster instituted in 2020, and also are not subject to restrictions on pitching by position players that were also introduced in 2020.

=== Recent players ===
In 2017, the Tampa Bay Rays selected Brendan McKay, a two-way player, and began developing him as a pitcher and a first baseman; he made his MLB debut as a pitcher and DH during the Rays' 2019 season.

Shohei Ohtani, a two-way player as a pitcher and outfielder, moved from Nippon Professional Baseball to MLB in 2018 and became one of the few players to hit and pitch professionally. He has been used as a DH on days when he does not pitch. Ohtani was named the 2018 American League Rookie of the Year after becoming the first player since Babe Ruth to hit at least 20 home runs and pitch at least 50 innings in the same season. In 2021, Ohtani became the first player to be selected for the MLB All-Star game as both a pitcher and designated hitter, and he finished the year with 46 home runs and a 158 OPS+ as a hitter and a 3.18 ERA on the mound, winning the AL MVP award unanimously. In 2022, Ohtani became the first modern-era player to qualify for hitting and pitching leaderboards in the same season, and in 2023 was again the unanimous AL MVP, also making the All-MLB first team as both a designated hitter and starting pitcher. After a season-ending injury in 2023, Ohtani underwent his second major elbow surgery. Ohtani opted to play in the 2024 season, exclusively hitting as a designated hitter, where he became the first and currently only member of the 50 home run and 50 stolen base club. He went on to unanimously win his first NL MVP award in 2024, becoming the first full-time designated hitter to win the award. Ohtani returned to the mound on June 16, 2025 against the Padres in Dodger Stadium. Ohtani started game 4 at home in the NLCS against the Brewers. Ohtani pitched six scoreless innings while recording 10 strikeouts, allowing 3 walks and 2 hits, throwing 100 pitches—his highest pitch count since returning from surgery. Offensively, he hit three home runs—including a 469-foot homerun that was the longest recorded at Dodger Stadium that season— and drew one walk. The Dodgers won the game 5-1, sweeping the Brewers. Ohtani was awarded the National League Championship Series Most Valuable Player Award for his dominant performance. He went on to win his 4th unanimous MVP, joining Barry Bonds as the only players in Major League history to win four or more MVP awards.

Pitcher Michael Lorenzen, a former two-way player at Cal State Fullerton, amassed 133 at-bats, 31 hits and seven home runs in his seven seasons with the Cincinnati Reds, and he played as an outfielder in 36 games. He would stop batting in the Major Leagues after leaving the Reds, pitching for the Los Angeles Angels, Detroit Tigers and Philadelphia Phillies, being named an All-Star and pitching a no-hitter in 2023.

Other major-league teams have evaluated prospects as two-way players, including Anthony Gose, Brett Eibner and Trey Ball.

== American football ==
=== NFL ===
In the National Football League (NFL), there are few two-way players. A major concern is the possibility of injury when a player is overused. In the early years of the NFL, two-way players were more common as part of the one-platoon system, but in modern times, they are a rarity.

Deion Sanders was a starter on defense who occasionally played offense, except for the 1996 season in which he played a considerable amount of offense as a wide receiver.

William "Refrigerator" Perry was a defensive lineman for the Chicago Bears from 1985 to 1993. Perry occasionally played fullback in goal line situations and set the then-record for the heaviest player to score a touchdown at 335 lb (152 kg).

Former St. Louis Rams player Mike Furrey was signed as a wide receiver in 2003 and was converted to safety in 2005, where he would record 58 solo tackles and 4 interceptions. The next season, this time as a member of the Detroit Lions, Furrey converted back to wide receiver where he recorded 98 receptions (second in the NFL), 1,086 receiving yards, and 6 touchdowns. Furrey would remain as a wide receiver until 2009, when as part of the Cleveland Browns, he was once again converted to safety and also played nickelback due to an injury-riddled secondary.

Troy Brown, well-regarded for his special-teams skills and as a wide receiver, played significant time at cornerback when starters were injured during the 2004 season. His three interceptions ranked second among Patriots players that season. He also played cornerback in an emergency role during the 2005 and 2006 seasons.

Linebacker Mike Vrabel (who was Brown's New England Patriots team-mate for several years) frequently lined up at tight end or fullback in short-yardage situations at the goal line. In his career, he caught ten touchdown passes as a receiver during the regular season, and two more during the playoffs. Those two post-season touchdowns came in successive Super Bowls: XXXVIII and XXXIX.

Longtime Baltimore Ravens fullback Patrick Ricard was a defensive lineman in college. The Ravens converted him to fullback in 2017 after signing him as an undrafted free agent out of the University of Maine. During his first three seasons, he also played as a defensive tackle. This included his third season in 2019, when he was selected as a starting fullback for the Pro Bowl. Ricard has not played defense since 2019, but as of 2026, he plays fullback for the New York Giants.

Scott Matlock of the Los Angeles Chargers was signed as a defensive lineman in 2023 and started playing fullback in 2024. Matlock's offensive coordinator Greg Roman also coached the previously mentioned Patrick Ricard, who made a similar transition to fullback from defensive lineman.

Travis Hunter of the Jacksonville Jaguars plays both wide receiver and defensive back.

=== College football ===
At the college level, some players play on both sides of the ball. In the mid-1980s, Gordie Lockbaum was a notable two-way player—he twice finished in the top five in Heisman Trophy balloting, and later was inducted to the College Football Hall of Fame.

Chris Gamble not only played offense and defense at Ohio State, but he also played all phases of special teams.

Owen Marecic was a first-team All-American at Stanford in 2010 after logging 51 tackles at linebacker and 46 yards and 5 touchdowns in mostly goal-line situations at fullback. He scored touchdowns on both offense and defense 13 seconds apart against Notre Dame.

While he was at UCLA (2013–2015), linebacker Myles Jack also played running back, and he won both the Pac-12 Conference Offensive and Defensive Freshman Player of the Year awards.

Travis Hunter played both wide receiver and cornerback for Jackson State in 2022 and for Colorado in 2023 and 2024. His head coach at both schools was a former two-way player, Deion Sanders. On November 29, 2024, Hunter was the first FBS player since 1996 to score 3 touchdowns on offense and record an interception. At the end of his junior season, he won the 2024 Heisman Trophy. In addition, he uniquely won both the Chuck Bednarik Award, as the nation's top defensive player, and the Fred Biletnikoff Award, as the nation's best wide receiver. He was drafted second overall in the 2025 NFL draft.

== Association football ==
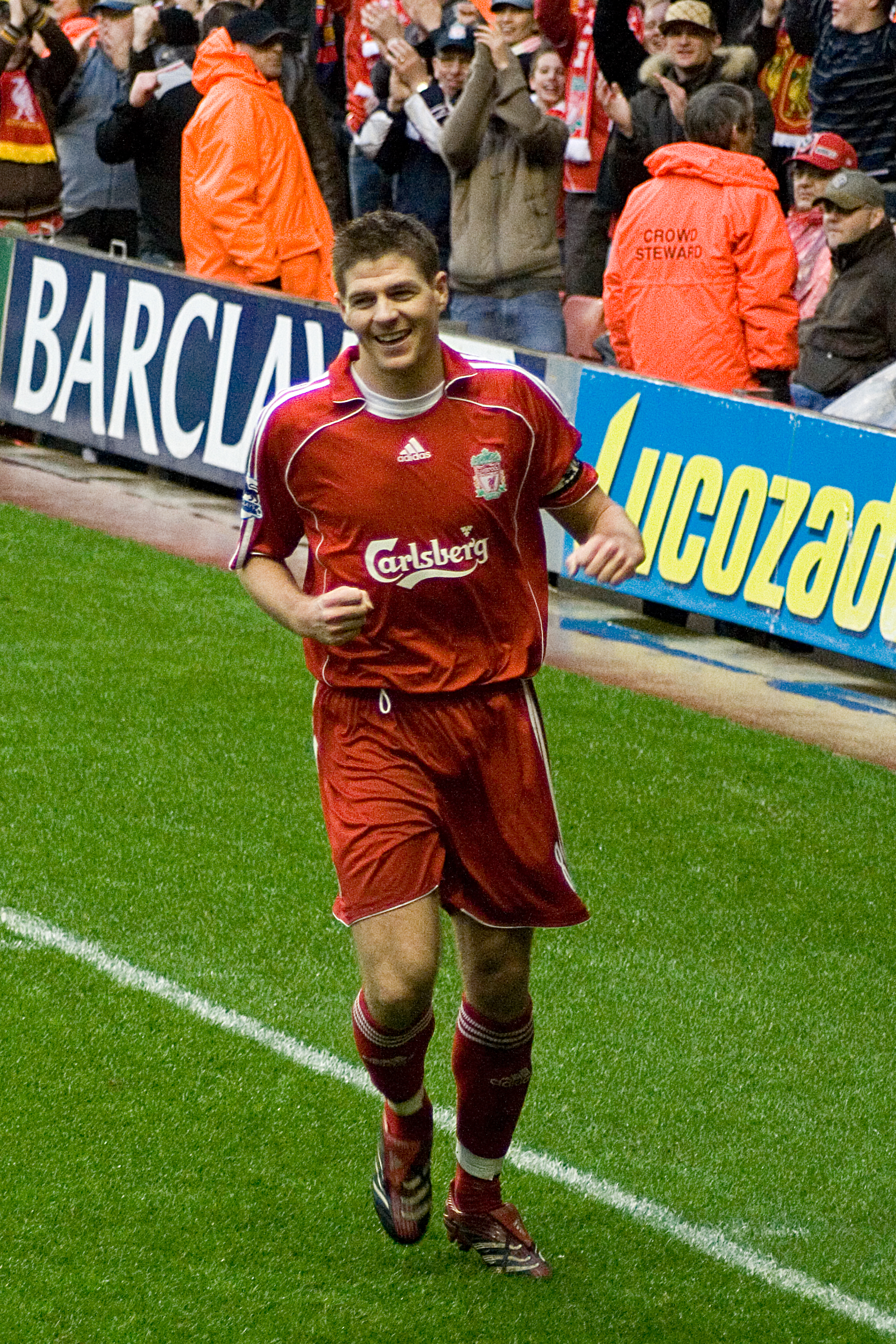
A hardworking box-to-box midfielder, Steven Gerrard has been lauded for his effectiveness both offensively and defensively; and his ability to make late runs from behind into the penalty area.

Box-to-box midfielders are a prominent example of two-way players in association football. Box-to-box midfielders are hard-working and have good all-round abilities, which makes them skilled at both defending and attacking; these players can therefore track back to their own box to block shots or to make tackles and interceptions, and also carry the ball forward or run to the opponents' box to try to score. Some notable examples of box-to-box midfielders are Lothar Matthäus, Clarence Seedorf, Bastian Schweinsteiger, Steven Gerrard, Johan Neeskens, Sócrates, Patrick Vieira, Bryan Robson and Roy Keane.

In recent times, full-backs have become two-way players, with the traditionally defensive position taking on a more attacking role than was the case traditionally, with full-backs often overlapping with wingers down the flank; wingerless formations, such as the diamond 4–4–2 formation, require the full-back to cover considerable ground up and down the flank.

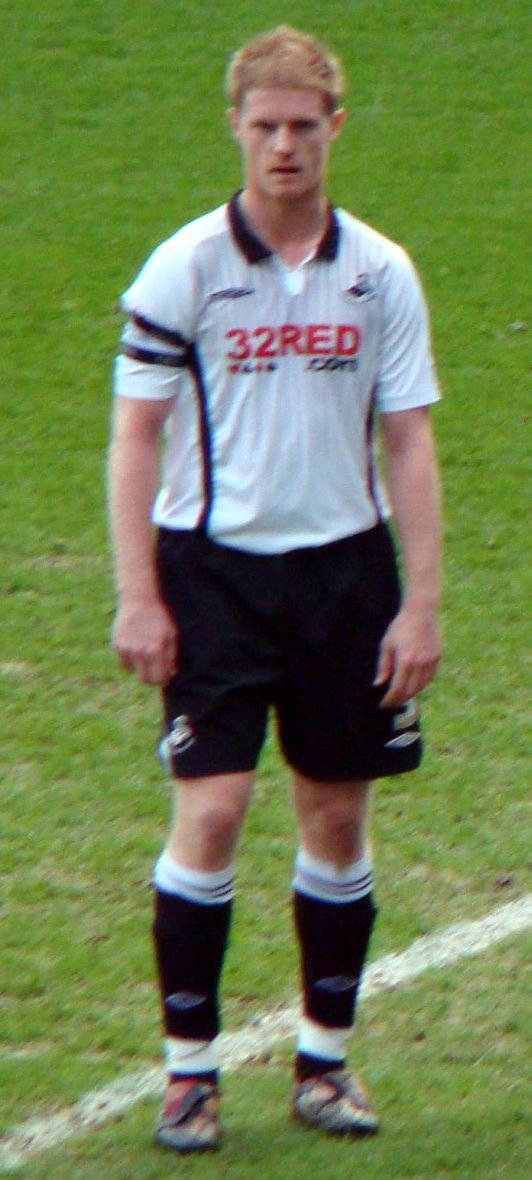
Alan Tate, who played the last 64 minutes plus extra time for Swansea City against Queens Park Rangers in 2008 as goalkeeper, and kept the goal clean to achieve a 0-0 draw.

Two-way players who are skilled at playing both goalkeeper and outfielder are very rare at the higher levels of play. Among the few who have started different matches as outfielder and goalkeeper were defender David Webb, who started one match in 1971 for Chelsea F.C. as goalkeeper, and Bobby Clark, the Scotland international goalkeeper who played two league matches for Aberdeen as a defender after losing his regular place in the team to Ernie McGarr.

In the event that a team loses all its regular goalkeepers to injuries or red cards, outfielders have occasionally switched mid-match to the goalkeeper role for the rest of the match, but the player's switch is not typically normalised in later matches.

Regular goalkeepers are not prohibited from participating in outfield activity while being goalkeeper, though this is normally considered risky. Examples include dribbling in defence, taking penalty kicks or free kicks, or if a team is 1 goal behind near the end of a match while a corner kick or free kick is awarded, the keeper can run up to the offence to attempt a last-minute goal.

== See also ==
- One-platoon system - a substitution system in American football where the same players were expected to stay on the field for the entire game, playing both offense and defense
- Utility player - a term for a player who more broadly plays multiple positions
- All-rounder, a cricketer who is skilled at batting and bowling
