= Lincoln Henzman =

American baseball player (born 1995)

Free agent
- Pitcher
- Born: July 4, 1995 (age 30); Lexington, Kentucky, U.S.
- Bats: Right Throws: Right

Garrett Lincoln Henzman (born July 4, 1995) is an American professional baseball pitcher who is a free agent.

== Amateur career ==
Henzman attended Lexington Christian Academy in Lexington, Kentucky, and played for the school's baseball team. He underwent Tommy John surgery during his junior year. After he graduated, he enrolled at the University of Louisville to play college baseball for the Louisville Cardinals. He was named a Freshman All-American by Louisville Slugger. Eligible for the Major League Baseball draft after his sophomore year, the Seattle Mariners selected him in the 31st round of the 2016 MLB draft. After the 2016 season, he played collegiate summer baseball with the Chatham Anglers of the Cape Cod Baseball League. He returned to Louisville in 2017, and served as their closer Henzman won the Stopper of the Year Award.

== Professional career ==
=== Chicago White Sox ===
The Chicago White Sox selected Henzman in the fourth round, with the 117th overall selection, of the 2017 MLB draft. Henzman signed with the White Sox. Since turning professional, he has been utilized primarily as a starter rather than as a reliever. He made his professional debut with the Arizona League White Sox. After one scoreless appearance, he was promoted to the Great Falls Voyagers and spent the remainder of the season there, going 0–3 with a 4.00 ERA in 27 innings. In 2018, he opened the season pitching for the Kannapolis Intimidators of the Single–A South Atlantic League and was then promoted to the Winston-Salem Dash of the High–A Carolina League. In 27 games (22 starts) between the two clubs, he pitched to a 6–4 record with a 2.35 ERA. Henzman returned to Winston-Salem to begin 2019. After pitching in nine games for Winston-Salem, he was promoted to the Birmingham Barons. Over 24 starts between the two clubs, he went 7–8 with a 5.24 ERA. On May 17, 2023, Henzman was released by the White Sox.

=== Lexington Counter Clocks ===
On June 2, 2023, Henzman signed with the Lexington Counter Clocks of the Atlantic League of Professional Baseball. In 36 relief outings for Lexington, Henzman posted a 5–4 record and 3.68 ERA with 60 strikeouts across 51 1/3 innings pitched.

=== Miami Marlins ===
On February 22, 2024, Henzman signed a minor league contract with the Miami Marlins. He made 12 appearances for the Double–A Pensacola Blue Wahoos, accompanied by a single scoreless outing for the Triple–A Jacksonville Jumbo Shrimp. In his time with Pensacola, Henzman compiled a 6.08 ERA with 10 strikeouts and one save across 13 1/3 innings of work. He was released by the Marlins organization on May 27.

=== Baltimore Orioles ===
On June 4, 2024, Henzman signed a minor league contract with the Baltimore Orioles. In 16 appearances for the Double–A Bowie Baysox, he posted a 4–2 record and 3.81 ERA with 25 strikeouts across 26 innings of work. Henzman was released by the Orioles organization on August 11.

=== Oakland Athletics ===
On August 22, 2024, Henzman signed a minor league contract with the Oakland Athletics. In 6 appearances for the Double-A Midland RockHounds, he posted an 0–1 record and 5.40 ERA with 3 strikeouts across 6 2/3 innings pitched. Henzman elected free agency following the season on November 4.
