= Spencer Shrader =

American football player (born 1999)

No. 3 – Indianapolis Colts
- Position: Placekicker
- Roster status: Active

Personal information
- Born: May 19, 1999 (age 27); Westfield, Indiana, U.S.
- Listed height: 6 ft 2 in (1.88 m)
- Listed weight: 201 lb (91 kg)

Career information
- High school: Newsome (Lithia, Florida)
- College: South Florida (2019–2022); Notre Dame (2023)
- NFL draft: 2024: undrafted

Career history
- Indianapolis Colts (2024); New York Jets (2024); Kansas City Chiefs (2024); Indianapolis Colts (2025–present)

Career NFL statistics as of Week 7, 2026
- Field goals made: 37
- Field goals attempted: 40
- Field goal %: 92.5
- Points scored: 147
- Longest field goal: 58
- Stats at Pro Football Reference

Spencer Michael Shrader (born May 19, 1999) is an American professional football placekicker for the Indianapolis Colts of the National Football League (NFL). He played college football for the South Florida Bulls and Notre Dame Fighting Irish and was signed by the Colts as an undrafted free agent in 2024.

== Early life ==
Shrader was born in Westfield, Indiana and grew up in Lithia, Florida and attended Newsome High School, where he lettered in football, soccer and tennis. Coming out of high school, Shrader decided to walk-on to play college football for the South Florida Bulls.

== College career ==
=== South Florida ===
In Shrader's first collegiate season in 2019, he went 12 for 12 on extra points and four for nine on field goal attempts. During the 2020 season, Shrader went four for six on his field goal attempts and 11 for 12 on his extra point attempts. In the 2021 season, Shrader finished as a Lou Groza semifinalist, as he converted on 11 of his 13 field goal attempts, while also making 35 of his extra point attempts. During the 2022 season, Shrader hit nine of thirteen field goal attempts, while also making all 37 of his extra point attempts. After the conclusion of the 2022 season, Shrader decided to enter his name into the NCAA transfer portal.

=== Notre Dame ===
Shrader decided to transfer to play for the Notre Dame Fighting Irish. In week three of the 2023 season, Shrader set a Notre Dame school record with a 54 yard field goal in a win over NC State. In, Shrader's final collegiate season in 2023 he went 15 for 22 on his field goal attempts with a career long of 54 yards, and 61 for his 62 on his extra point attempts.

== Professional career ==
=== Pre-draft ===
Pre-draft measurables
Height	Weight	Arm length	Hand span	Wingspan
6 ft 1 1/2 in (1.87 m)	201 lb (91 kg)	31 3/8 in (0.80 m)	9 in (0.23 m)	6 ft 2 1/2 in (1.89 m)
All values from Pro Day

=== Indianapolis Colts (first stint) ===
On April 27, 2024, Shrader signed with the Indianapolis Colts as an undrafted free agent after he was not selected in the 2024 NFL draft. He was waived on August 25, and re-signed to the practice squad on August 29.

Shrader was elevated to the active roster for the Colts Week 1 game against the Houston Texans following an injury to Matt Gay. He made all three extra-point attempts during the 29–27 loss. Shrader was released on October 2 but re-signed on October 7. Shrader was again released on October 16.

=== New York Jets ===
On October 30, 2024, Shrader signed with the New York Jets practice squad. Shrader was elevated to the active roster on November 9. He made his Jets debut the following day, converting both of his field goal attempts.

=== Kansas City Chiefs ===
On November 14, 2024, Shrader was signed by the Kansas City Chiefs off the Jets practice squad following an injury to Harrison Butker. On November 24, Shrader hit a game-winning field goal as time expired, giving the Chiefs a 30–27 victory over the Carolina Panthers. On December 4, 2024, Shrader was placed on injured reserve.

=== Indianapolis Colts (second stint) ===
On March 13, 2025, Shrader signed a deal to return to the Indianapolis Colts. In Week 2, Shrader went a perfect 5-for-5, including a 45-yard game-winning kick, in a 29–28 Colts win over the Denver Broncos. On October 5, Shrader suffered an injury on an extra-point attempt in the Colts' Week 5 matchup against the Las Vegas Raiders after being hit by safety Tristin McCollum. Shrader was forced to exit the game early. It was later announced that Shrader had suffered a torn ACL and MCL in his right knee and would be out for the remainder of the season.

== Personal life ==
Shrader is married to Lyon and USWNT soccer player Korbin Albert.

== Career statistics ==
=== NFL ===
Year	Team	GP	Field goals					PATs			Kickoffs			Pts
Year	Team	GP	FGM	FGA	FG%	Lng	Blk	XPM	XPA	XP%	KO	Avg	TBs	Pts
2024	IND	1	0	0	—	0	0	3	3	100.0	5	65.0	5	3
2024	NYJ	1	2	2	100.0	45	0	0	0	—	3	65.0	3	6
2024	KC	2	3	3	100.0	41	0	6	6	100.0	10	65.0	9	15
2025	IND	5	13	14	92.9	52	0	14	14	100.0	21	56.9	2	53
2026	IND	6	18	18	100.0	58	0	12	13	92.3	14	61.2	2	66
Career		9	23	24	95.8	58	0	35	36	97.2	32	65.0	19	143

=== College ===
Year	Team	GP	Extra points			Field goals				Pts
Year	Team	GP	XPM	XPA	XP%	FGM	FGA	FG%	Lng	Pts
2019	South Florida	12	12	12	100.0	4	9	44.4	34	24
2020	South Florida	8	11	12	91.7	4	6	66.7	49	23
2021	South Florida	12	35	35	100.0	11	13	84.6	52	68
2022	South Florida	12	37	37	100.0	9	13	69.2	49	64
2023	Notre Dame	13	61	62	98.4	15	22	68.2	54	106
Career		57	156	158	98.7	43	63	68.3	54	285
