= Ana Cate =

American-born Nicaraguan footballer

Personal information
- Full name: Ana Victoria Cate Aguilar
- Date of birth: 5 August 1991 (age 35)
- Place of birth: Florida, United States
- Height: 1.55 m (5 ft 1 in)
- Position: Midfielder

Youth career
- Joe E. Newsome High School

College career
Years	Team	Apps	(Gls)
2009–2012	Auburn Tigers	77	(15)

Senior career*
Years	Team	Apps	(Gls)
2014	FH	17	(4)
2015–2018	Stjarnan	49	(12)
2019	HK/Víkingur	1	(0)
2020	KR	5	(0)
2023	Breiðablik	0	(0)

International career^{‡}
2010–2017	Nicaragua	10	(2)
- * Club domestic league appearances and goals as of 12 February 2024 ‡ National team caps and goals as of 26 December 2022

Ana Victoria Cate Aguilar (born 5 August 1991) is a Nicaraguan former footballer who played as a midfielder. She was a member of the Nicaragua women's national team and was the first Nicaraguan woman to play professionally in Europe. Her mother is Nicaraguan and her father is American.

== Playing career ==
Ana grew up in FishHawk, Florida, playing high school soccer for Joe E. Newsome High School in Lithia, before attending Auburn University. From 2013 to 2014, she played for Durham University where she was the team's Most Valuable Player during the 2014 season. In 2014, she became the first woman from Nicaragua to play professionally in Europe, when she signed with FH Hafnarfjörður of the Icelandic First Division, scoring four (4) goals and 10 assists in 17 of the 18 games she played in the season. She started in 16 games. In 2015, she played with Stjarnan of the Icelandic First Division, starting in two games. She became the first Nicaraguan to score in, and the first Nicaraguan to win a pre-season title in a European first-division league.

She retired from playing following the 2020 season.

In August 2023, she was registered as a player for Breiðablik after the team suffered several injuries but did not appear in any matches.

== National team career ==
In 2013, Cate scored two (2) goals against Guatemala at the X Central American Sports Games in Costa Rica for Nicaragua's first silver medal in this discipline.

By 2014, she was part of the Nicaragua national team at the XXII Central American and Caribbean Games held in Veracruz, Mexico. During the qualifying phase she was declared the Man of the Match in Nicaragua's 1-0 win over the Dominican Republic.

== Coaching career ==
Cate served as the strength trainer of Stjarnan from 2017 to 2018 for HK/Víkingur in 2019. In November 2022, she was hired as a strength trainer for Breiðablik. In August 2023, she

== Personal life ==
In 2018, Cate joined Soccer Without Borders Nicaragua, an organization that promotes gender equality. She is also a member of Common Goal, an organization through which professional footballers donate a portion of their salary to global social change programs.
