= Ryan Eckley =

American football player (born 2004)

No. 30 – Baltimore Ravens
- Position: Punter
- Roster status: Active

Personal information
- Born: February 16, 2004 (age 22); Lithia, Florida, U.S.
- Listed height: 6 ft 1 in (1.85 m)
- Listed weight: 205 lb (93 kg)

Career information
- High school: Newsome (Lithia)
- College: Michigan State (2022–2025)
- NFL draft: 2026: 6th round, 211th overall pick

Career history
- Baltimore Ravens (2026–present)

Awards and highlights
- Big Ten Punter of the Year (2025); First-team All-Big Ten (2025); 2× Second-team All-Big Ten (2023, 2024)

Career NFL statistics as of Week 7, 2026
- Punts: 29
- Punting yards: 1,365
- Punting average: 47.1
- Longest punt: 62
- Inside 20: 13
- Touchbacks: 2
- Stats at Pro Football Reference

Ryan Eckley (born February 16, 2004) is an American professional football punter for the Baltimore Ravens of the National Football League (NFL). He played college football for the Michigan State Spartans and was selected by the Ravens in the sixth round of the 2026 NFL draft.

== Early life ==
Eckley played baseball at FishHawk sporting complex as a pitcher. Eckley attended Newsome High School located in Lithia, Florida. Coming out of high school, he was rated as a five-star punter, where he committed to play college football for the Michigan State Spartans as a preferred walk-on.

== College career ==
During his first collegiate season in 2022, Eckley punted just once as he sat behind future NFL punter Bryce Baringer. During his first season as the team's starting punter in 2023, he averaged 46.8 yards per punt, where for his performance he was named a freshman all-American. During the 2024 season, Eckley averaged 47.9 yards per punt to lead the Big Ten, where for his performance he was named second-team all-conference. In week one of the 2025 season, Eckley punted six times for an average of 51.3 yards per punt, while also attempting a field goal in a season opening win over Western Michigan. In week two, he was named the Ray Guy Punter of the Week, after punting three times for an average of 54.7 yards per punt, with all three being downed inside the 20, with two being downed at the one-yard line in a double overtime win versus Boston College.

== Professional career ==
Pre-draft measurables
Height	Weight	Arm length	Hand span	Wingspan
6 ft 0 3/4 in (1.85 m)	200 lb (91 kg)	31 in (0.79 m)	9 1/4 in (0.23 m)	6 ft 3 1/2 in (1.92 m)
All values from NFL Combine

Eckley was selected by the Baltimore Ravens in the sixth round with the 211th overall pick in the 2026 NFL draft.
