= Tristan Stivors =

American baseball player (born 1998)

Free agent
- Pitcher / Coach
- Born: September 22, 1998 (age 27); Corpus Christi, Texas, U.S.
- Bats: Right Throws: Right

Tristan Lee Stivors (born September 22, 1998) is an American professional baseball pitcher who is a free agent.

== Playing career ==
=== Amateur ===
Stivors graduated from Medina Valley High School in Castroville, Texas. He enrolled at New Mexico Junior College and in 2019, he transferred to Texas State University to play college baseball for the Texas State Bobcats. In 2022, Stivors led the NCAA in saves and was a consensus All-American selection. He also won the Stopper of the Year Award.

=== Chicago White Sox ===
The Chicago White Sox selected Stivors in the 16th round, with the 491st overall selection, of the 2022 Major League Baseball draft. He spent his first professional season with the rookie-level Arizona Complex League White Sox and Single-A Kannapolis Cannon Ballers. Stivors split the 2023 campaign between the Double-A Birmingham Barons, the High-A Winston-Salem Dash, and the ACL White Sox. In 34 appearances out of the bullpen for the three affiliates, he compiled a 5-4 record and 3.52 ERA with 56 strikeouts and 7 saves across 38 1/3 innings pitched.

Stivors spent 2024 with Birmingham and the ACL White Sox. In 24 combined appearances, he accumulated a 2-0 record and 3.77 ERA with 38 strikeouts over 31 innings of work. Stivors was released by the White Sox organization on March 23, 2025.

=== Cleburne Railroaders ===
On January 6, 2026, Stivors departed his coaching role and signed with the Cleburne Railroaders of the American Association of Professional Baseball. He did not make an appearance for Cleburne prior to his release on May 13.

== Coaching career ==
On September 15, 2025, Stivors was hired to serve as the assistant director of pitching development for Texas State.
