= Brendan McKay (baseball) =

American baseball player (born 1995)

- McKay with the Durham Bulls
- Pitcher / Designated hitter / First baseman
- Born: December 18, 1995 (age 30); Darlington, Pennsylvania, U.S.
- Batted: Left Threw: Left

MLB debut
- June 29, 2019, for the Tampa Bay Rays

Last MLB appearance
- September 29, 2019, for the Tampa Bay Rays

MLB statistics
- Win–loss record: 2–4
- Earned run average: 5.14
- Strikeouts: 56
- Batting average: .200
- Home runs: 1
- Runs batted in: 1
- Stats at Baseball Reference

Teams
- Tampa Bay Rays (2019)

Career highlights and awards
- Golden Spikes Award (2017); Dick Howser Trophy (2017)

Brendan Joel McKay (born December 18, 1995) is an American former professional baseball pitcher and designated hitter. He played in Major League Baseball (MLB) for the Tampa Bay Rays. The Rays selected McKay in the first round, with the fourth overall selection, of the 2017 Major League Baseball draft. He played college baseball at the University of Louisville.

== Amateur career ==
McKay attended Blackhawk High School in Chippewa, Pennsylvania. He was a member of the varsity baseball team for all four seasons of his high school career and also played one season of high school basketball. As a senior, he had a 72 1/3 consecutive scoreless innings streak. Overall, he was 8–1 with a 0.56 earned run average (ERA) and 130 strikeouts. McKay was named the Pennsylvania Gatorade Baseball Player of the Year in both his junior and senior seasons. He was drafted by the San Diego Padres in the 34th round of the 2014 Major League Baseball draft, but did not sign and attended the University of Louisville to play college baseball.

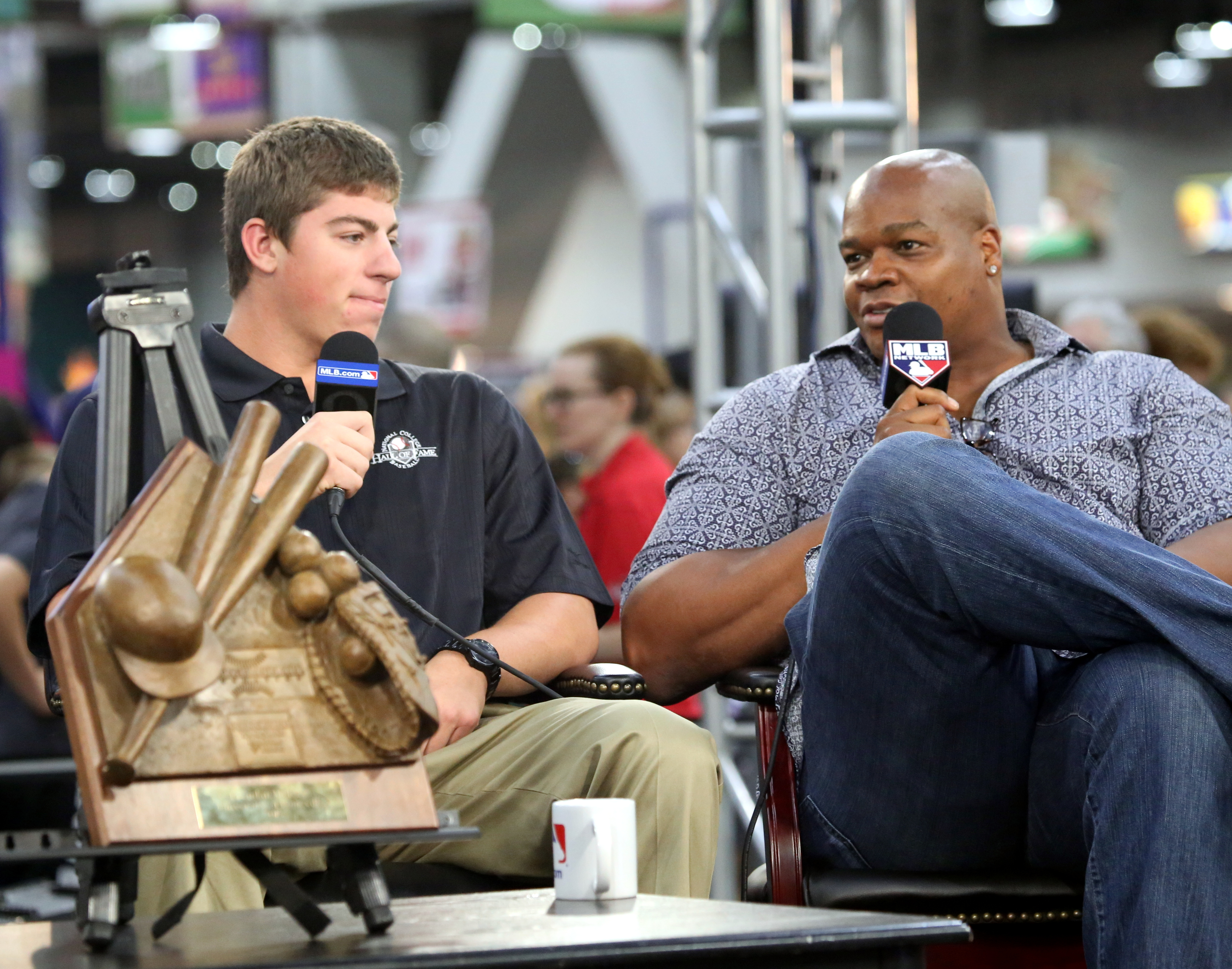
McKay with Frank Thomas at the presentation for the 2015 John Olerud Award

McKay was a two-way player at Louisville as a freshman in 2015, pitching and playing first base. McKay pitched in 20 games, making 13 starts. He went 9–3 with a 1.77 ERA, 117 strikeouts and four saves. In 61 games as a first baseman, he hit .308/.418/.431 with four home runs and 34 runs batted in (RBI). Due to his two-way success, he won the John Olerud Award. McKay was also named the Baseball America Freshman of the Year. After the 2015 season, he played collegiate summer baseball with the Bourne Braves of the Cape Cod Baseball League. As a sophomore, McKay again won the John Olerud Award. As a pitcher, he went 12–4 with a 2.30 ERA and 128 strikeouts and hit .333/.414/.513 with six home runs and 41 RBI as a hitter.

McKay won numerous awards as a junior in 2017. He won the Golden Spikes Award and Dick Howser Trophy and was named the Player of the Year by the Collegiate Baseball Newspaper and Baseball America. He also won the John Olerud Award for the third consecutive season and was named the ACC Baseball Player of the year.

== Professional career ==
The Tampa Bay Rays selected McKay in the first round, with the fourth overall selection, of the 2017 Major League Baseball draft. His signing bonus with the Rays for more than $7 million, the second-largest signing bonus since constraints were placed on the draft in 2012, behind only Hunter Greene. The Rays announced that they intended for McKay to both hit and pitch in the minors. He was assigned to the Hudson Valley Renegades and spent the whole season there. In 36 games, he batted .232 with four home runs and 22 RBI along with pitching 20 innings, posting a 1.80 ERA with 21 strikeouts. In the 2017 MLB.com midseason prospect update, McKay ranked as the 3rd best prospect in the Tampa Bay Rays farm system (Brent Honeywell, Willy Adames) and the 23rd best prospect nationally.

McKay began the 2018 season with the Rays' Class A affiliate, the Bowling Green Hot Rods, and was subsequently promoted to the Advanced A Charlotte Stone Crabs, where he both pitched and played first base. In 21 games for Bowling Green, he hit .254 with one home run and 16 RBIs along with posting a 2–0 record with a 1.09 ERA in six starts. In 32 games for Charlotte, McKay batted .210 with five home runs and 21 RBIs and in 11 games (nine starts) on the mound, he went 3–2 with a 3.21 ERA.

For the 2019 season, McKay was assigned to the Montgomery Biscuits. He went 3–0 with a 1.30 ERA in eight appearances (seven starts) with 62 strikeouts in 42 2/3 innings while batting .167 with one home run and seven RBIs with Montgomery before being promoted to the Triple-A Durham Bulls. McKay was named to the 2019 All-Star Futures Game.

On June 28, 2019, the Rays selected McKay's contract and promoted him to the major leagues. In his major league debut against the Texas Rangers the next day, McKay took a perfect game into the sixth inning. He pitched six innings in the process allowing two base runners. He made his debut as a batter on July 1 against the Baltimore Orioles, going 0-for-4 as the Rays' designated hitter. He was sent down to Triple–A over the All-Star break but recalled on July 13, 2019, as the 26th man during a double header against the Orioles. McKay hit his first Major League home run against Trevor Kelley of the Boston Red Sox on September 22.

McKay missed the beginning of the 2020 season after testing positive for COVID-19. He began working out again on August 11, but was shut down soon after with shoulder tightness. On August 18, the Rays announced McKay required left shoulder surgery and would miss the entire 2020 season. McKay returned in 2021, starting seven games as a pitcher, three with the rookie-level Florida Complex League Rays and four with the Durham Bulls. Overall, he had a 7.82 ERA while striking out 13 batters in 12 2/3 innings. On November 23, 2021, McKay underwent surgery for thoracic outlet syndrome (TOS).

McKay underwent Tommy John surgery in September 2022, after suffering a UCL injury while pitching with the Bulls in July. On November 10, 2022, McKay was removed from the 40-man roster and sent outright to Triple–A Durham. The Rays released him on November 14, but re-signed him to a two-year minor league deal on December 15, 2022.

McKay returned to the mound in the minor leagues at the start of the 2024 season but, by May 14, he was sidelined again by injuries in his pitching arm. According to Marc Topkin of the Tampa Bay Times, he had "a flexor/pronator strain with an accompanying UCL sprain (tear)." On November 6, he elected free agency.
