= Vahn Lackey =

American baseball player (born 2005)

Minnesota Twins
- Catcher
- Born: July 7, 2005 (age 21); Suwanee, Georgia, U.S.
- Bats: Right Throws: Right
- Stats at Baseball Reference

Vahn Edward Lackey (born July 7, 2005) is an American professional baseball catcher in the Minnesota Twins organization. He played college baseball for the Georgia Tech Yellow Jackets.

== Amateur career ==
Lackey started catching in his little league because they only had used a left-handed catcher. He attended Collins Hill High School in Suwanee, Georgia. He committed to Georgia Tech to play college baseball, starting as a lowly ranked prospect.

As a freshman at Georgia Tech in 2024, Lackey played in 36 games with 26 starts and hit .214/.330/.381 with four home runs and 15 runs batted in (RBI) over 84 at-bats. After the season, he played summer league ball for the Traverse City Pit Spitters. As a sophomore in 2025, Lackey started 50 of 60 games and hit .347/.421/.500 with six home runs, 42 RBI and 18 stolen bases over 222 at-bats. After the season, he played for the United States collegiate national team, and also played collegiate summer baseball with the Hyannis Harbor Hawks of the Cape Cod Baseball League.

Lackey returned to Georgia Tech for his junior season in 2026 as the starting catcher. In a game against West Georgia he became the first player in Georgia Tech history to play in eight different positions during a game.

== Professional career ==
Lackey was a top prospect for the 2026 MLB draft and was drafted third overall by the Minnesota Twins. He signed with the Twins for a signing bonus of approximately $9.5 million. At the time, it was the second-highest signing bonus in MLB draft history, until Grady Emerson surpassed it a few days later.

On July 30, 2026, he made his professional debut with the Single-A affiliate Fort Myers Mighty Mussels.
