= Sam Cozart =

American baseball player (born 2006)

Texas Longhorns – No. 35
- Relief pitcher
- Born: July 18, 2006 (age 20); Orlando, Florida, U.S.
- Bats: Right Throws: Right

Career highlights and awards
- Stopper of the Year Award (2026)

Samuel Craig Cozart (born July 18, 2006) is an American college baseball relief pitcher for the Texas Longhorns.

== Personal life ==
Cozart grew up with his parents Craig and Michelle, along with his two older brothers: Jacob and Caleb. Both of Cozart's brothers played college baseball, with Jacob also currently being a member of the Double-A Rocket City Trash Pandas in the Los Angeles Angels organization. At age five, Cozart began to serve as the bat boy for the High Point Panthers baseball team, where Craig served as the head coach. Michelle homeschooled Cozart and his brothers throughout elementary school so that the family could travel to High Point baseball games.

Starting in middle school, Cozart attended Wesleyan Christian Academy, where he played baseball. In seventh grade, Cozart was the closer for Wesleyan's high school baseball team, and in eighth grade, he was the team's ace. Before his freshman year, Cozart committed to play college baseball for Mississippi State, primarily due to pitching coach Scott Foxhall's relationship with his family. However, following Foxhall's termination in May 2023, Cozart decommitted from Mississippi State and instead committed to Texas A&M after being impressed by their coaching staff. Cozart later flipped his commitment to Texas, following head coach Jim Schlossnagle after he, pitching coach Max Weiner, and recruiting coordinator Nolan Cain joined the staff at Texas. Over the course of his career at Wesleyan, Cozart recorded a 19–1 record with a 1.97 ERA and 283 strikeouts, helping Wesleyan win two state championships in the process.

== College career ==
Before his freshman year, Cozart played summer collegiate baseball for the West Virginia Black Bears of the MLB Draft League. Cozart made his collegiate debut on February 17, 2026, against Lamar, allowing three hits and one run along with four strikeouts for his first win. On February 24, Cozart set a career-high in strikeouts, registering eight along with one hit and three walks in a win against UTRGV. Cozart was named SEC Freshman of the Week for his performance on March 3 against Houston Christian, in which he allowed one hit with six strikeouts across a season-high 5.0 innings for a win. He was named SEC Freshman of the Week again for consecutive appearances against Alabama on April 17 and 18, in which he pitched a combined 4.0 innings with zero hits and one walk along with eight strikeouts. On the season, Cozart registered a 6–0 record with a 1.72 ERA and 77 strikeouts, with Cozart being named the NCBWA Freshman Pitcher of the Year and the Stopper of the Year Award as a result. Cozart was also tabbed as a unanimous All-American.

During the offseason, coach Schlossnagle indicated that Cozart would join the Texas starting pitcher rotation for the 2027 season. In July, Cozart underwent minor surgery on his right foot.
