= Johnny Bench Award (2019–present) =

College baseball award

- Awarded for: Best catcher in NCAA Division I
- Sponsored by: MSA Sport
- Country: United States
- Presented by: Johnny Bench

History
- First award: 2019
- Most recent: Vahn Lackey (Georgia Tech); Kendall Wells (Oklahoma)

The Johnny Bench Award was created in 2019 to honor the best catcher in both college baseball and college softball in the National Collegiate Athletic Association's Division I. The award is administered by MSA Sport and presented after the conclusion of the College World Series.

Named for Johnny Bench, it was first awarded in 2019. Previously, there was another award called the Johnny Bench Award, but after Bench decided to create his own national award, that award was renamed the Buster Posey Award.

In addition to naming the top college baseball and softball catchers, the top high school catchers in Ohio, Kentucky, Indiana, and West Virginia are also recognized.

== Winners ==
Key
Year	Links to the article about the corresponding baseball year
Player	Name of the player
School	The player's college when he won the award
Class	The player's year in college when he won the award
^	Player won the MLB Rookie of the Year Award (Note: Won either in the same year or several years later.)
§	Player also won the Golden Spikes Award and Dick Howser Trophy in the same year
‡	Player is active in MLB (Note: A player is considered inactive if he has announced his retirement or not played for a full season.)

College baseball
Year	Name	School	Class	Ref(s)
2019	Adley Rutschman^{‡}^{§}	Oregon State	Junior	
2020	Patrick Bailey^{‡}	NC State	Junior	
2021	Matheu Nelson^{‡}	Florida State	Junior	
2022	Kevin Parada^{‡}	Georgia Tech	Sophomore	
2023	Kyle Teel^{‡}	Virginia	Junior	
2024	Cole Messina^{‡}	South Carolina	Junior	
2025	Caden Bodine	Coastal Carolina	Junior	
2026	Vahn Lackey	Georgia Tech	Junior	

College softball
Year	Name	School	Class	Ref(s)
2019	Dejah Mulipola	Arizona	Junior	
2020	Morganne Flores	Washington	Senior	
2021	Kayla Kowalik	Kentucky	Junior	
2022	Jordyn Rudd	Northwestern	Senior	
2023	Kinzie Hansen	Oklahoma	Senior	
2024	Jocelyn Erickson	Florida	Sophomore	
2025	Reese Atwood	Texas	Junior	
2026	Kendall Wells	Oklahoma	Freshman	

== See also ==
- List of college baseball awards
