= John Olerud Award =

College baseball award

- Logo for the John Olerud Award
- Awarded for: Best two-way player in college baseball
- Country: United States
- Presented by: College Baseball Foundation

History
- First award: 2010
- Most recent: Evan Dempsey, Florida Gulf Coast
- Website: John Olerud Award

The John Olerud Two-Way Player of the Year Award (known colloquially as the John Olerud Award) is a college baseball award given to the best two-way player of the season. The award is named after former Washington State Cougars All-American pitcher and first baseman John Olerud.

== Winners ==
Key
‡	Denotes player also won the Golden Spikes Award and/or Dick Howser Trophy in the same year

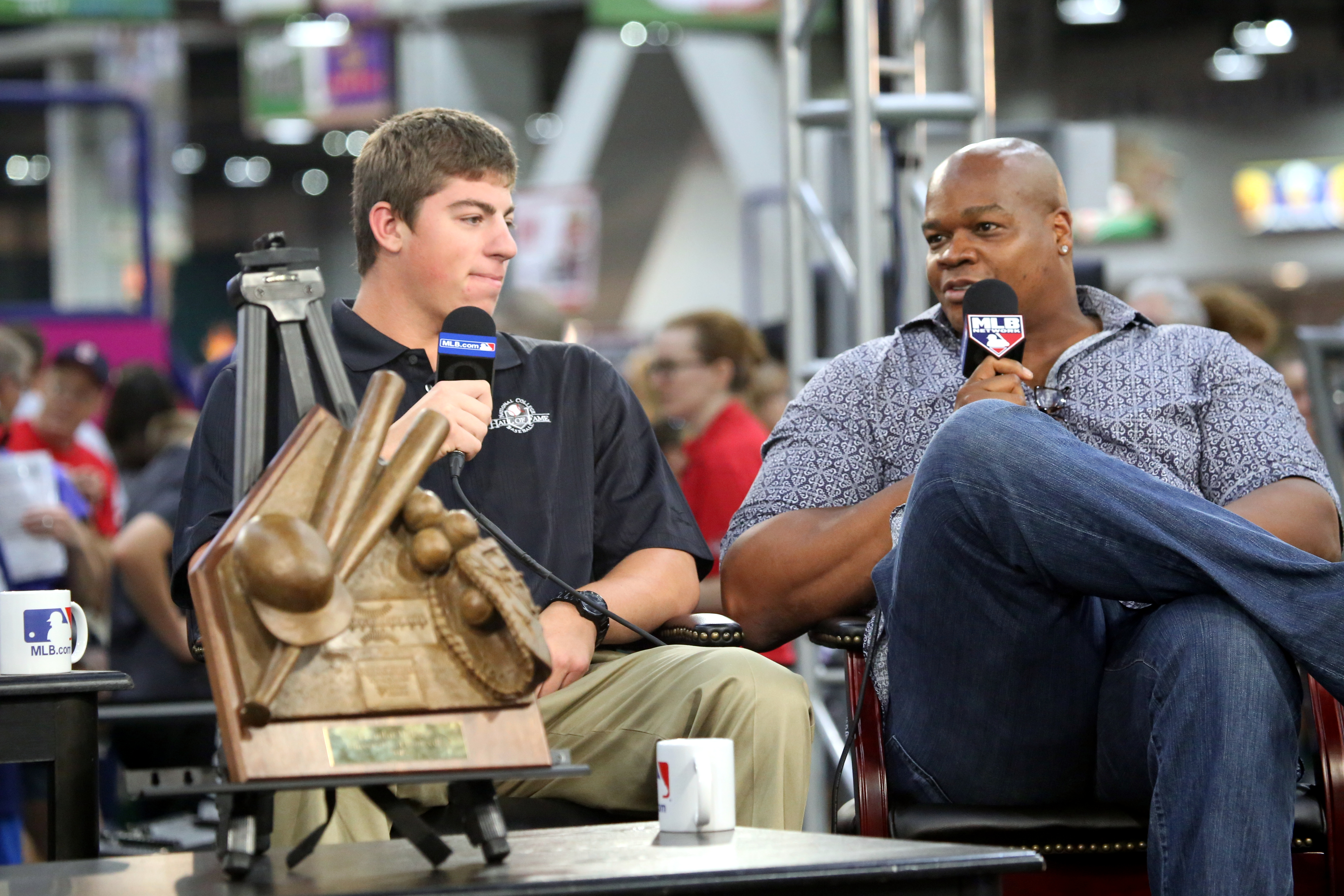
Brendan McKay (left) with Frank Thomas receiving the 2015 John Olerud Award

Year	Winner	School	Class	Ref
2010	Mike McGee	Florida State	Junior	
2011	Danny Hultzen	Virginia	Junior	
2012	Brian Johnson	Florida	Junior	
2013	Marco Gonzales	Gonzaga	Junior	
2014	A. J. Reed^{‡}	Kentucky	Junior	
2015	Brendan McKay	Louisville	Freshman	
2016	Brendan McKay (2)	Louisville	Sophomore	
2017	Brendan McKay^{‡} (3)	Louisville	Junior	
2018	Brooks Wilson	Stetson	Senior	
2019	Aaron Schunk	Georgia	Junior	
2020	Not presented; season canceled in progress due to COVID-19			
2021	Spencer Schwellenbach	Nebraska	Junior	
2022	Paul Skenes	Air Force	Sophomore	
2023	Caden Grice	Clemson	Junior	
2024	Jac Caglianone	Florida	Junior	
2025	Evan Dempsey	Florida Gulf Coast	Sophomore	
2026	Evan Dempsey (2)	Florida Gulf Coast	Junior	

== See also ==
- List of college baseball awards
- Baseball awards#U.S. college baseball
- College Baseball Hall of Fame
