= Dylan Volantis =

American baseball player (born 2005)

Texas Longhorns – No. 99
- Pitcher
- Born: October 7, 2005 (age 21); Torrance, California
- Bats: Left Throws: Left

Career highlights and awards
- 2× College Baseball All-America Team (2025, 2026)

Dylan Volantis (born October 7, 2005) is an American college baseball pitcher for the Texas Longhorns.

== Amateur career ==
Volantis grew up in and attended Westlake High School. He went 8-1 with a 0.33 ERA as a senior. Volantis initially committed to play college baseball at USC, but later flipped his commitment to Texas. Volantis was selected in the 20th round of the 2024 Major League Baseball draft by the Oakland Athletics, but opted not to sign with the team.

Volantis entered his freshman season with the Texas Longhorns as a relief pitcher and was named the team's closer early in the season. He was named the Southeastern Conference (SEC) Freshman of the Year at the end of the regular season.
