= Aiden Robbins =

American baseball player (born 2005)

New York Mets
- Outfielder
- Born: January 14, 2005 (age 21); Yardley, Pennsylvania, U.S.
- Bats: Right Throws: Right
- Stats at Baseball Reference

Aiden Robbins (born January 14, 2005) is a professional baseball outfielder in the New York Mets organization. He played college baseball for the Seton Hall Pirates and Texas Longhorns.

== Amateur career ==
Robbins attended Holy Ghost Preparatory School in Bensalem, Pennsylvania. He committed to Seton Hall University to play college baseball.

Robbins started all 43 games he played in his freshman year at Seton Hall in 2024, hitting .302/.368/.512 with six home runs and 31 runs batted in (RBI) over 162 at bats. As a sophomore in 2025, Robbins started all 53 games and hit .422/.537/.652 with six home runs and 38 RBI over 204 at bats. After the season he entered the transfer portal and transferred to the University of Texas at Austin. In 2024 and 2025, he played collegiate summer baseball with the Harwich Mariners of the Cape Cod Baseball League, and won the league's batting title in 2025.

Robbins entered his junior year in 2026 as a starter for the Longhorns.

== Professional career ==
Robbins was a top prospect for the 2026 Major League Baseball draft. He was drafted in the 3rd round (92nd overall) by the New York Mets in the draft. On July 17, 2026, he signed with the Mets for a signing bonus of $1 million.

== Personal life ==
Robbins is nicknamed "Baseball Jesus", given to him by his college head coach, Jim Schlossnagle. He also shaves his head to raise money for the St. Baldrick’s Foundation, a tradition he started following the death of his childhood best friend from neuroblastoma.
