= Stopper of the Year Award =

College baseball award

- Awarded for: Best relief pitcher in NCAA's Division I
- Country: United States
- Presented by: National Collegiate Baseball Writers Association

History
- First award: 2005
- Most recent: Sam Cozart, Texas

The Stopper of the Year Award was created in 2005 to honor college baseball's top relief pitcher. The award is administered and voted on by the National Collegiate Baseball Writers Association.

== Past winners ==
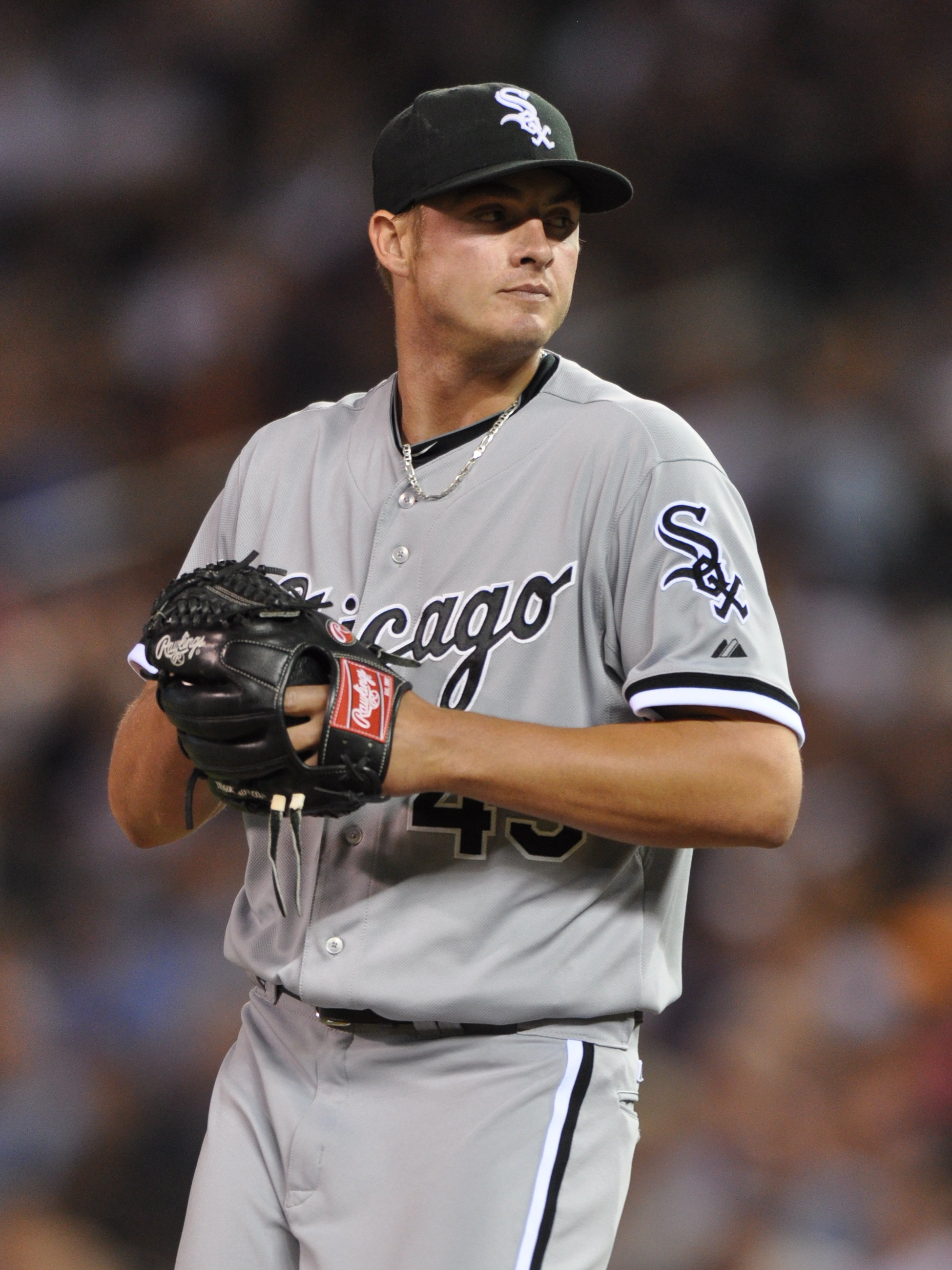
Addison Reed

Key
| Year | Links to the article about the corresponding baseball year |
| Player | Name of the player |
| School | The player's college when he won the award |
| ‡ | Player is active (Note: A player is considered inactive if he has announced his retirement or not played for a full season.) |

Winners
| Year | Name | School | Ref(s) |
|---|---|---|---|
| 2005 | J. B. Cox | Texas | |
| 2006 | Don Czyz | Kansas | |
| 2007 | Luke Prihoda | Sam Houston State | |
| 2008 | Josh Fields | Georgia | |
| 2009 | Addison Reed | San Diego State | |
| 2010 | Chance Ruffin | Texas | |
| 2011 | Corey Knebel | Texas | |
| 2012 | Stefan Lopez | Southeastern Louisiana | |
| 2013 | David Berg | UCLA | |
| 2014 | Nick Burdi^{‡} | Louisville | |
| 2015 | David Berg | UCLA | |
| 2016 | Bryan Garcia | Miami | |
| 2017 | Lincoln Henzman | Louisville | |
| 2018 | Michael Byrne | Florida | |
| 2019 | Holden Powell^{‡} | UCLA | |
| 2020 | Not awarded | | |
| 2021 | Kevin Kopps^{‡} | Arkansas | |
| 2022 | Tristan Stivors | Texas State | |
| 2023 | Cade Denton^{‡} | Oral Roberts | |
| 2024 | Evan Aschenbeck^{‡} | Texas A&M | |
| 2025 | Tony Pluta^{‡} | Arizona | |
| 2026 | Sam Cozart | Texas | |

== See also ==
- List of college baseball awards
