= Kris Bryant =

American baseball player (born 1992)

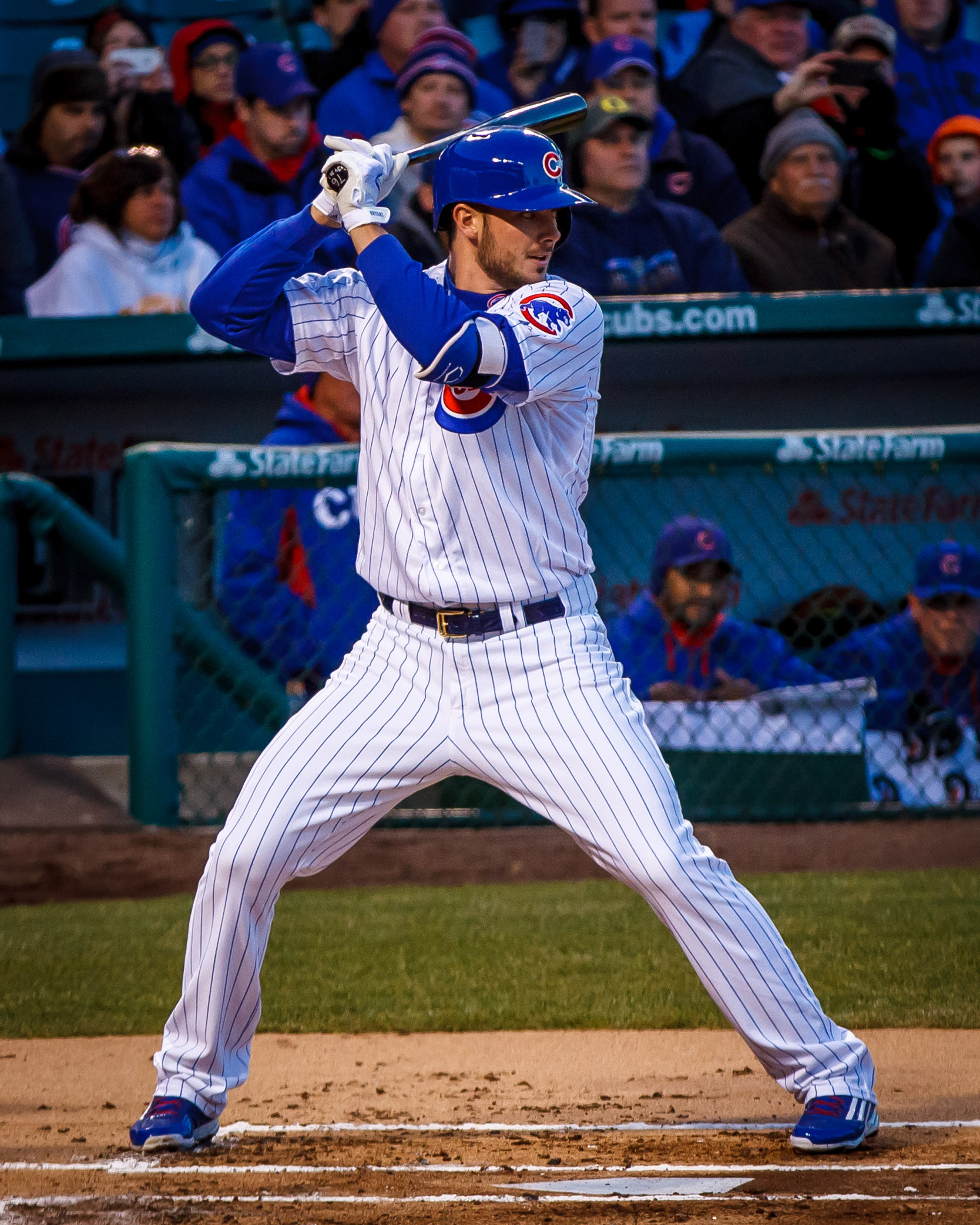
- Bryant with the Chicago Cubs in 2015

Colorado Rockies – No. 23
- Third baseman / Outfielder / Designated hitter
- Born: January 4, 1992 (age 34); Las Vegas, Nevada, U.S.
- Bats: Right Throws: Right

MLB debut
- April 17, 2015, for the Chicago Cubs

MLB statistics (through 2025 season)
- Batting average: .273
- Hits: 1,068
- Home runs: 184
- Runs batted in: 548
- Stats at Baseball Reference

Teams
- Chicago Cubs (2015–2021); San Francisco Giants (2021); Colorado Rockies (2022–2025)

Career highlights and awards
- 4× All-Star (2015, 2016, 2019, 2021); World Series champion (2016); NL MVP (2016); NL Rookie of the Year (2015); NL Hank Aaron Award (2016); Golden Spikes Award (2013); Dick Howser Trophy (2013)
Medals
Men's baseball
Representing the United States
Haarlem Baseball Week
Bronze medal – third place	2012	Team

Kristopher Lee Bryant (born January 4, 1992), nicknamed "KB", is an American professional baseball third baseman, outfielder, and designated hitter for the Colorado Rockies of Major League Baseball (MLB). He has previously played in MLB for the Chicago Cubs and San Francisco Giants.

Bryant attended the University of San Diego, where he played college baseball for the Toreros. He was named an All-American in 2012 and 2013 and won the Dick Howser Trophy and Golden Spikes Award in 2013. The Cubs selected him with the second overall pick in the 2013 MLB draft, and he quickly became one of the top prospects, winning the USA Today Minor League Player of the Year Award and Baseball America Minor League Player of the Year Award in 2014.

Bryant made his major league debut in 2015. He was named an MLB All-Star and won the National League's (NL) Rookie of the Year Award. He was again named an All-Star in 2016, won a World Series championship with the Cubs, and won the NL Most Valuable Player Award. He was named an All-Star again in 2019 and 2021. The Cubs traded him to the Giants in 2021, and after that season he signed a seven-year contract with the Rockies.

== Early life ==
Kristopher Lee Bryant was born on January 4, 1992, in Las Vegas, Nevada. Bryant attended Bonanza High School in Las Vegas, Nevada. Playing baseball for the school's varsity team all four years, he had a .418 batting average, .958 slugging percentage (SLG), 103 hits, and 47 home runs. He also played American Legion Baseball. USA Today named him to their All-USA baseball first-team in 2010. The Toronto Blue Jays selected Bryant in the 18th round of the 2010 Major League Baseball draft, but he did not sign.

== College career ==
Bryant enrolled at the University of San Diego to play college baseball for the San Diego Toreros.

As a freshman at San Diego in 2011, Bryant had a .365 batting average, .482 on-base percentage (OBP), .599 SLG, and nine home runs. He was named a freshman All-American by Louisville Slugger and the West Coast Conference (WCC) Co-Freshman of the Year and Co-Player of the Year, sharing both honors with Marco Gonzales. Following his freshman season, Bryant played collegiate summer baseball for the Chatham Anglers of the Cape Cod Baseball League, batting .223 with three home runs and 16 runs batted in (RBIs) in 37 games.

As a sophomore in 2012, Bryant batted .366 with a .671 SLG, 14 home runs, and 57 RBIs. He was again named first team All-WCC and he was also named a first-team All-American by Baseball America. That summer, Bryant was selected by USA Baseball to play for the U.S. collegiate national team. The team finished third at the Haarlem Baseball Week tournament.

In 2013 as a junior, Bryant hit 31 home runs to lead the NCAA. He hit the most home runs by a college player since the NCAA switched to a BBCOR composite bat in 2011, breaking the previous record of 30 set by Georgia Southern's Victor Roache in 2011 and amounted to more home runs than 223 of 296 Division I teams hit that season. Bryant won the Golden Spikes Award and the Dick Howser Trophy, both awarded to the top collegiate player in the nation. He was also named a Louisville Slugger First Team All-American, the Collegiate Baseball Player of the Year, and the American Baseball Coaches Association (ABCA) Player of the Year.

== Professional career ==
=== Draft and minor leagues (2013–2015) ===
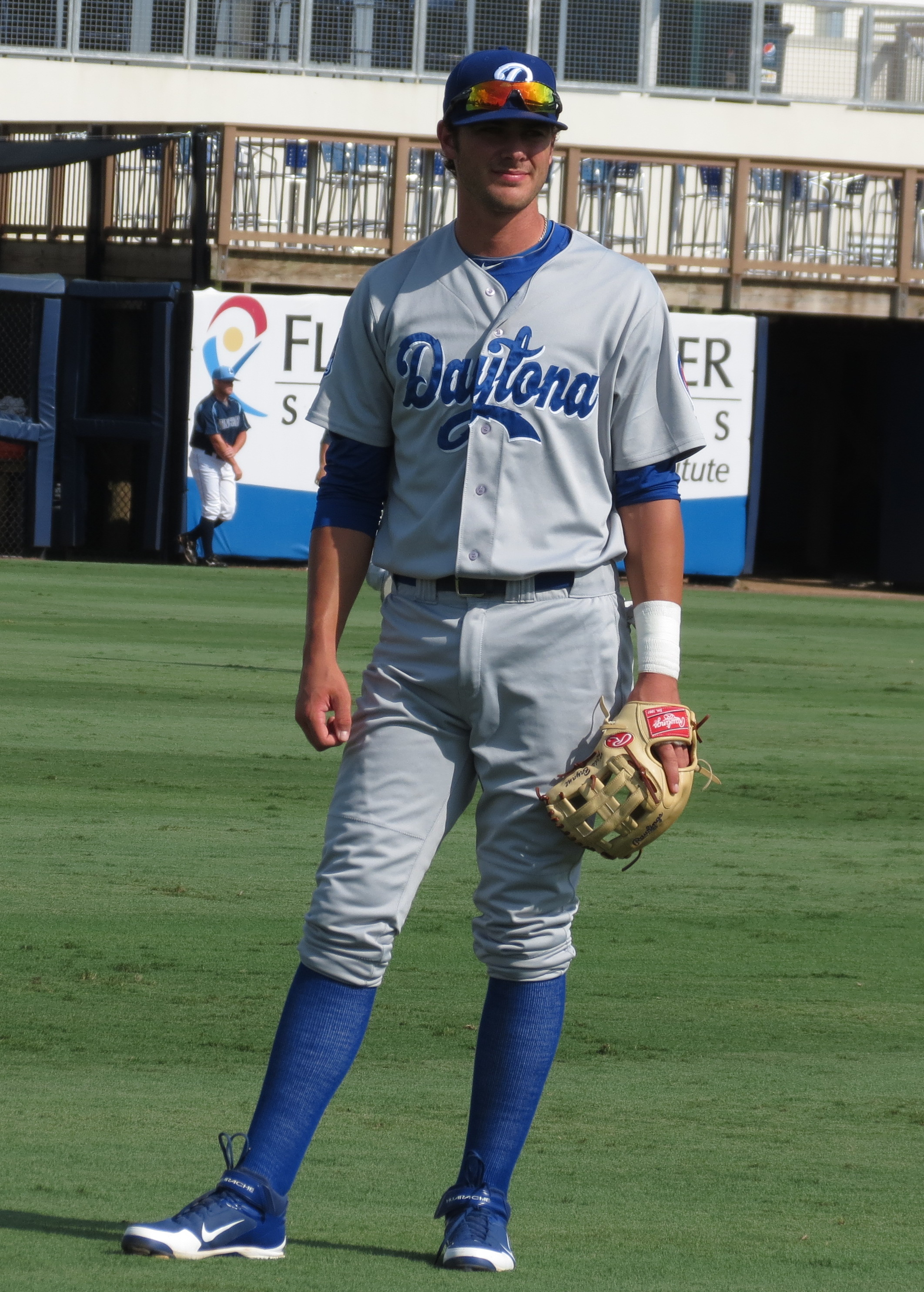
Bryant with the Daytona Cubs in September 2013

Bryant was considered to be one of the best available players in the 2013 Major League Baseball draft. The Houston Astros, who had the first overall pick, scouted Bryant. Bryant believed he would be chosen by the Colorado Rockies, who had the third selection of the draft.

After the Astros selected pitcher Mark Appel with the first overall selection, the Chicago Cubs chose Bryant with the second pick. This choice was surprising as the Cubs were expected to select a pitcher. The Cubs later acknowledged that they would have selected Appel had he still been available. Many baseball executives and scouts agreed that Bryant was the safest pick in the draft. He was also rated as the best hitter in the draft because of his abilities hitting for power and making contact on inside fastballs as well as down-and-away curveballs. Bryant and the Cubs agreed to a contract with a $6.7 million signing bonus two days prior to the signing deadline.

Bryant began his professional career with the Low-A Boise Hawks of the Northwest League, where he batted .354 with four home runs. He was promoted to High-A with the Daytona Cubs of the Florida State League on August 12, where he hit .333 with five home runs. After the season, he played in Arizona Fall League (AFL). He was named co-player of the week, along with Mitch Haniger, in the first week of the fall league. He was named the MVP of the AFL after hitting .364/.457/.727 with six home runs in 20 games.

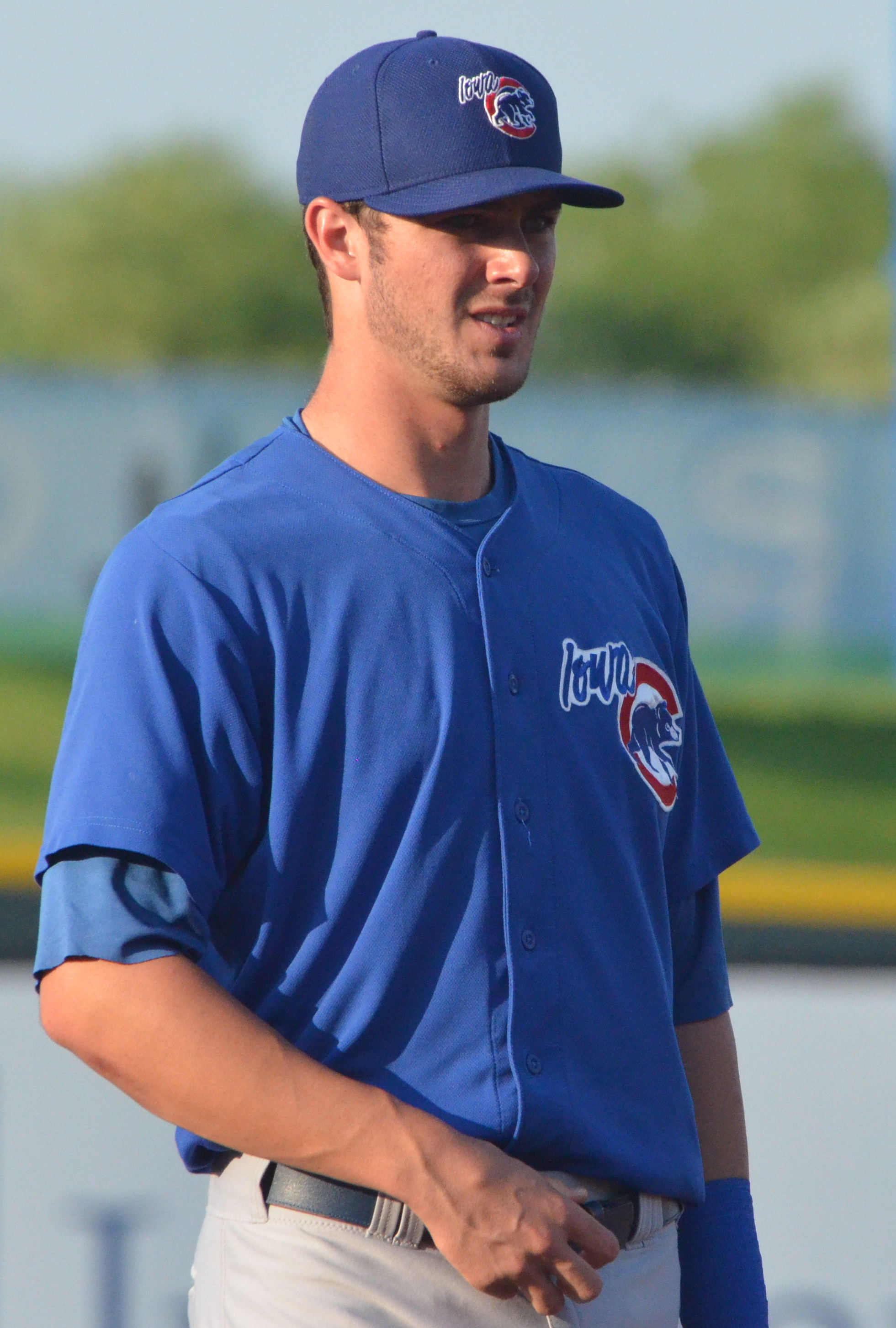
Bryant playing for the Iowa Cubs in July 2014

Bryant started 2014 in Double-A with the Tennessee Smokies of the Southern League. In June, he won the Home Run Derby and participated in the All-Star game. On June 18, the Cubs promoted Bryant to Triple-A with the Iowa Cubs of the Pacific Coast League after batting .355 with 22 home runs and 58 RBIs in 68 games with Tennessee. He played in the All-Star Futures Game in July. At the end of the regular season, Bryant's 43 combined home runs between Tennessee and Iowa won him the Joe Bauman Home Run Award. Bryant was named the USA Today Minor League Player of the Year and Baseball America Minor League Player of the Year. Baseball America named him the No. 1 prospect in 2015.

Bryant was invited to spring training by the Cubs in 2015. In 40 at-bats, he hit nine home runs, which led all players. He had a .425/.477/1.175 slash line. Despite his performance, the Cubs sent Bryant back to Iowa. Baseball analysts assumed that the service-time rules in MLB were a major influence on the team's decision; if Bryant were to play 12 days in the minors before being promoted to the majors, the Cubs would receive another year of club control. The MLB Players Association issued a statement saying, "Today is a bad day for baseball". In seven games with the Iowa Cubs, Bryant hit three home runs and batted .321.

=== Chicago Cubs (2015–2021) ===
==== 2015 season: NL Rookie of the Year ====
On April 17, 2015, Bryant was called up to the majors by the Cubs. He made his debut that day at Wrigley Field, going 0-for-4 with three strikeouts. The next day at Wrigley, Bryant recorded his first hit, an RBI single. Bryant hit his first major league home run on May 9, off Milwaukee Brewers' pitcher Kyle Lohse. His second home run came two days later at Wrigley Field against the New York Mets, off Jacob deGrom. Bryant finished the month of May with a .265 batting average, seven home runs, 22 RBIs, and 16 walks and was named the National League (NL) Rookie of the Month for May.

Bryant's first career grand slam came on June 17 in the ninth inning off outfielder David Murphy in a 17–0 win against the Cleveland Indians. On July 4 against the Miami Marlins, Bryant hit both a two-run home run and his second grand slam of the season off Jarred Cosart. This made him the second Cubs rookie to hit two grand slams since Billy Williams in 1961. Bryant was selected as an injury replacement selection for Giancarlo Stanton on the NL roster of the All-Star Game in Cincinnati, Ohio. He also participated in the Home Run Derby. On July 25, against the Philadelphia Phillies, Bryant flew out at the warning track for the last out of Cole Hamels' no-hitter. On July 27, Bryant hit his first career walk-off home run, a two-run shot off John Axford in a 9–8 win over the Colorado Rockies.

On September 6, against the Arizona Diamondbacks, Bryant hit a 495-foot (151 m) home run, the longest of the MLB season, off Rubby De La Rosa. With the home run, Bryant tied Williams (1961) and Geovany Soto (2008), for the Cubs' franchise single-season RBI record for rookies with 86. On September 11, Bryant broke the record, driving in a run with a double. On September 22, he passed Williams for the most home runs by a Cubs rookie, with 26.

In 151 games of his rookie season, Bryant batted .275 with 26 home runs, 31 doubles, and 99 RBIs, which were the most for a rookie since Albert Pujols's 130 for the 2001 St. Louis Cardinals. Bryant struck out 199 times, which led the NL and set a new rookie record. He had the lowest contact percentage on his swings in the major leagues (66.3%). According to sales on MLB's website, Bryant had the best-selling jersey in baseball during the 2015 regular season.

With the Cubs finishing the season, 97–65, the team clinched a Wild Card spot in the postseason, their first playoff berth in seven years. Despite Bryant not having any hits in the NL Wild Card Game, the Cubs shut out the Pittsburgh Pirates, 4–0, and advanced to the NL Division Series (NLDS) where, in Game 3, Bryant hit a two-run home run against the rival Cardinals to help the Cubs to an 8–6 win. The Cubs won the series, winning three games to one, but lost to the New York Mets in the NL Championship Series (NLCS) in a four-game sweep. Bryant was named the Baseball America Rookie of the Year, making him the first in history to win the Baseball America college player, minor league player, and major league rookie of the year awards in successive seasons. He was voted the "Esurance MLB Awards" Best Rookie – by fans, the media, former players, team front-office personnel, and the Society for American Baseball Research (SABR). Bryant won the Sporting News Rookie of the Year Award for the NL, becoming the first Cub to earn it since Soto in 2008. Further, he was the unanimous winner from the Baseball Writers' Association of America (BBWAA) of the NL Rookie of the Year Award, becoming the 11th NL player to win by a unanimous vote. He was also named by his fellow players as the Players Choice Awards NL Most Outstanding Rookie.

After the season, Bryant filed a grievance against the Cubs for delaying his call-up to the majors for the purpose of delaying his free agency, accusing the team of service time manipulation. About the grievance, Bryant said, "For me it’s just important to continue to go out there and do what I do, so that I can help the team in any way possible in where we’re at today," Bryant added, "It's just important for me to not even worry about it right now because it takes away from so much of what we have going this year. And that was last year’s news." The grievance was finally heard in January 2020, with the arbitrator ruling against Bryant, setting his free agency for after the 2021 season.

==== 2016 season: NL MVP ====
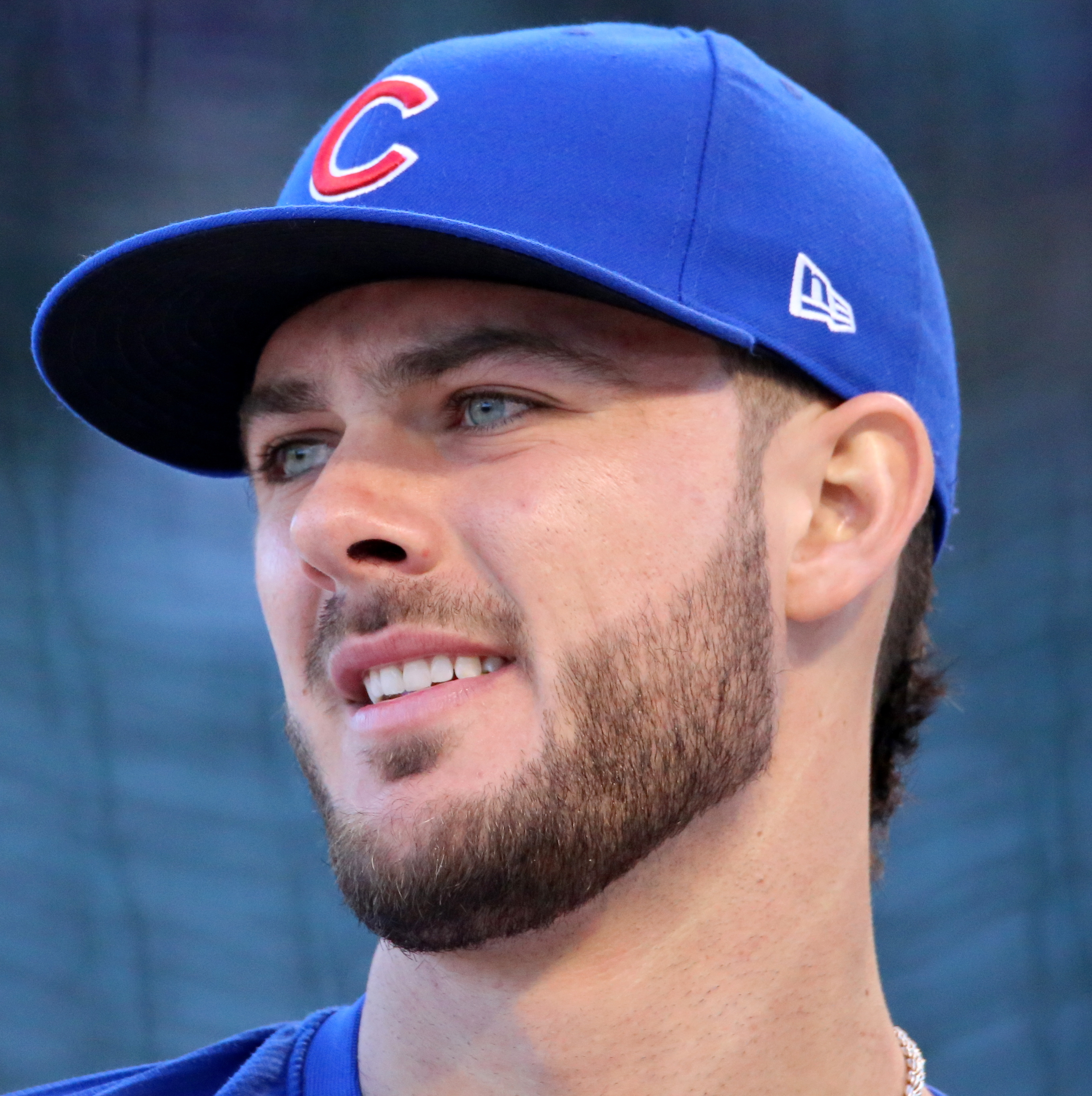
Bryant with the Cubs in 2016

The Cubs gave Bryant a $652,000 salary for the 2016 season, a 38% increase over his rookie salary. On June 27 against the Cincinnati Reds, Bryant became the first MLB player in modern history to hit three home runs and two doubles in the same game; he was 5-for-5 with 16 total bases in the 11–8 win. After leading the NL with 25 home runs in the first half of the season, he was selected to his second consecutive All-Star Game, and first as the starting third baseman. He hit a first-inning home run off Chris Sale of the Chicago White Sox, his first career home run in an All-Star Game. In the opening game of a late August series against the NL West-leading Los Angeles Dodgers, Bryant hit an eighth-inning home run to tie the game and the winning two-run home run in the 10th inning for a 6–4 victory.

From the All-Star Break to the start of September, Bryant had a batting average of .346. On August 18, he became the second player in major league history to record five hits and five RBIs in two games in one season, joining 1945 MVP Phil Cavarretta of the Cubs. In August, as the Cubs went 22–6, Bryant batted .383, with a 1.220 on-base plus slugging (OPS), 10 home runs, 22 RBI, and 29 runs scored. He was named the NL Player of the Month for August, his first Player of the Month award. Overall, he led the league with 121 runs scored and 7.3 Wins Above Replacement (WAR) per Baseball Reference and finished third with 39 home runs and 334 total bases and fourth with a .554 slugging percentage and .939 OPS. He also batted .292 and drove in 102 runs. In each of those categories, Bryant's statistics represented improvements over his rookie season totals. He was ninth in the NL with 154 strikeouts.

The Cubs won the NL Central division title. Bryant recorded hits in all four games against the San Francisco Giants in the NLDS. With the Cubs trailing 5–3 in the ninth inning of Game 3, he hit a two-run home run against Sergio Romo, helping send the game to extra innings, though the Giants would prevail in 13. In Game 4 with the Cubs down 5–2, Bryant singled to start a four-run rally in the top of the 9th, scoring on a double by Ben Zobrist, as the Cubs advanced to the NLCS. The Cubs then won the NL pennant—for the first time since 1945—by defeating the Los Angeles Dodgers, 4 games to 2. In the World Series, the Cubs came back from a 3-games-to-1 deficit and defeated the Cleveland Indians. Bryant fielded the last ball of the series and threw to first baseman Anthony Rizzo, which completed their first championship victory after a 108-year-long drought. During the postseason, Bryant hit for a .308 average with three home runs and eight RBIs.

Bryant concluded the season by winning the NL Most Valuable Player Award (MVP) in his second year in the majors. He became the first player to win a Golden Spikes Award, a Baseball America Minor League Player of the Year Award, a Rookie of the Year Award, and a Most Valuable Player Award in successive seasons. In addition, he became the sixth player in MLB history to win Rookie of the Year and MVP within his first two seasons, joining Fred Lynn (both in 1975), Cal Ripken Jr. (1982–83), Ichiro Suzuki (both in 2001), Ryan Howard (2005–06), and Dustin Pedroia (2007–08). Bryant also won the Hank Aaron Award as the NL's most outstanding hitter.

==== 2017 season ====
Bryant and the Cubs agreed to a $1.05 million contract before the 2017 season, a new record salary for a pre-arbitration player, previously held by Mike Trout of the Los Angeles Angels who earned $1 million in 2014.

In 2017, Bryant finished second in fan voting to Nolan Arenado of the Colorado Rockies as the starting NL third baseman in the All-Star Game. He finished second in the All-Star Final Vote behind Justin Turner and did not make the All-Star team. On July 25, Bryant was ejected for the first time in his major league career after arguing a third strike call. That August, MLB and the MLBPA introduced Players Weekend for the first time. Bryant chose to wear "KB" on his jersey. Finishing the regular season with a .295 average, 29 home runs, and 73 RBIs, the Cubs won their second consecutive NL Central title and earned their third consecutive appearance in the postseason. The Cubs defeated the Washington Nationals in the NLDS, with Bryant batting .200 in the series with no home runs. The Cubs lost to the Dodgers in the NLCS. Bryant batted .200 with one home run in the NLCS.

==== 2018 season ====
In his first year of salary arbitration, Bryant and the Cubs agreed to a $10.85 million salary for the 2018 season, breaking the record for a player in his first year of salary arbitration, previously held by Ryan Howard when he signed a $10 million contract in 2008 with the Philadelphia Phillies. In February, Sports Illustrated ranked Bryant as the third-overall best player in baseball, trailing Mike Trout and Jose Altuve. In a May 9 game against the Miami Marlins, Bryant hit his 100th home run, becoming the quickest of the 22 Cubs players to reach that mark. He hit his 100th home run in his 487th game, eclipsing the previous mark of 500 games set by Ernie Banks. On June 26, Bryant was placed on the disabled list for the first time in his MLB career due to left shoulder inflammation, retroactive three days prior. On July 26, Bryant went back on the disabled list due to inflammation in the same shoulder. After topping 150 games in his first three MLB seasons, a threshold he would not reach in his next eight, he played in 102 games, batting .272 with 13 home runs and 52 RBI.

==== 2019 season ====
Bryant had a slow start to 2019. After hitting a home run in the first regular season game against the Texas Rangers, his batting average through April 25 was .232 with a .730 OPS. His performance substantially improved heading into mid May. He hit seven home runs over 15 games, including a walk-off, three-run home run against the Miami Marlins on May 7. On May 18, Bryant hit three home runs in three consecutive innings in a game against the Nationals. His 4-for-6 night extended his career-best on-base streak to 26 games. On June 30, he was chosen as a reserve for his third All-Star Game.

Bryant ended the season hitting .282/.382/.521 with 31 home runs, 77 RBI, and 108 runs scored. On defense, he had the lowest fielding percentage of all major league third basemen (.947).

==== 2020 season ====
In the COVID-19 pandemic-shortened 2020 season, Bryant batted .206/.293/.351 with four home runs and 11 RBIs in 147 plate appearances in 34 games. He sprained his left ring finger while attempting to make a diving catch on August 12, eventually sending him to the 10-day injured list. He batted 0-for-8 in his final postseason with the Cubs, who were swept by the Marlins in the Wild Card Series.

==== 2021 season ====
For the first time in his career, Bryant was not primarily a third baseman in 2021, due to the rise of Patrick Wisdom. Bryant played 63 games in the outfield, 29 games at third and 12 games at first base. He was selected as an All-Star as he hit .267/.358/.503 with 58 runs, 18 home runs, and 51 RBIs throughout 93 games and 326 at bats with the Cubs.

=== San Francisco Giants (2021) ===
On July 30, 2021, the Cubs traded Bryant to the San Francisco Giants in exchange for prospects Alexander Canario and Caleb Kilian. On August 1, Bryant made his Giants debut. He played third base and went 1-for-4 with a home run in the third inning.

In the 2021 season, playing for the Giants Bryant batted .262/.344/.444 with 28 runs, seven home runs, and 22 RBIs in 187 at bats, also stealing six bases in six attempts. He played 26 games at third base, 19 games in left field, 11 games in right field, and 5 games in center field. He batted 8-for-17 with a home run in his only postseason with San Francisco, as the Giants lost to the Dodgers in the NLDS in 5 games.

=== Colorado Rockies (2022–present) ===
On March 18, 2022, Bryant signed a seven-year, $182 million contract with the Colorado Rockies. It reportedly included a full no-trade clause. The Rockies quickly announced that he would be the club's starting left fielder.

The deal, completed at a time when the Rockies would not be a serious contender in the following season after trading Nolan Arenado and not re-signing Trevor Story, came as a surprise. Sports journalist Buster Olney stated, "On a scale of 1 to 10, the industry shock over the Rockies' deal with Kris Bryant has been turned up to 11."

Bryant has missed significant time due to injury during his time with Colorado. He played only 42 games in 2022, with a back issue causing over two months on two separate IL stints, and the last two months of the 2022 season lost due to plantar fasciitis and a bone bruise in his right foot. That season, he slashed .306/.376/.475 with five home runs in 160 at-bats.

In 2023, Bryant missed three months of the season, playing in only 80 games, with heel issues and then a broken finger from a Johnny Cueto pitch. He finished the season with a .233/.313/.367 slash line and 10 home runs in 300 at-bats.

Before the 2024 season, Bryant told The Athletic that he wished he had taken more time to evaluate the Rockies' upcoming minor league prospects and the team's near-term inability to compete before he signed the seven-year deal.

Bryant went on to play in 13 games before going on the injured list with a low back strain. He was activated from the injured list on May 21, after missing 31 games, and played until June 2 before being put onto the injured list again on June 6 with a lower rib contusion. He finished 2024 with a .218/.323/.301 slash line and two home runs in 133 at-bats. During the season, a sports columnist for the Denver Post opined that Bryant's contract was the worst in baseball.

On April 14, 2025, Bryant was placed on the 10-day injured list due to his battles with lumbar degenerative disc disease. Despite this setback and chronic back issues, Bryant said he did not plan to retire. He was transferred to the 60-day injured list on May 11. Due to injuries, he did not play for the Rockies again in 2025 and finished the year with a slash line of .154/.195/.205 in 39 at-bats.

On February 10, 2026, Bryant was placed on the 60-day injured list as a result of his back condition. Bryant would not play during the 2026 season.

== Charitable acts ==
In 2017, Bryant teamed up with Bryce Harper to help their hometown of Las Vegas in relief efforts assisting victims of a shooting at a music concert that left 58 people dead. Bryant and Harper used their platform to encourage people to donate to help Las Vegas with relief of the shooting.

On Players Weekend in 2017, Bryant chose to wear three different cleats which promoted the Wings for Life Foundation, a non-profit organization that specializes in spinal cord research. Bryant has been heavily involved in this organization ever since 2011 when a friend of his, Cory Hahn, was paralyzed while a freshman playing baseball at Arizona State.

On Players Weekend in 2018, Bryant shed lights on spinal cord injury research, wearing cleats designed with Wings for Life Foundation.

In 2015, Bryant was awarded 2015 NL Outstanding Rookie from the Player Choice Awards. He chose to send the $20,000 from the Major League Baseball Players Trust to the Wounded Warrior Project.

== Awards ==
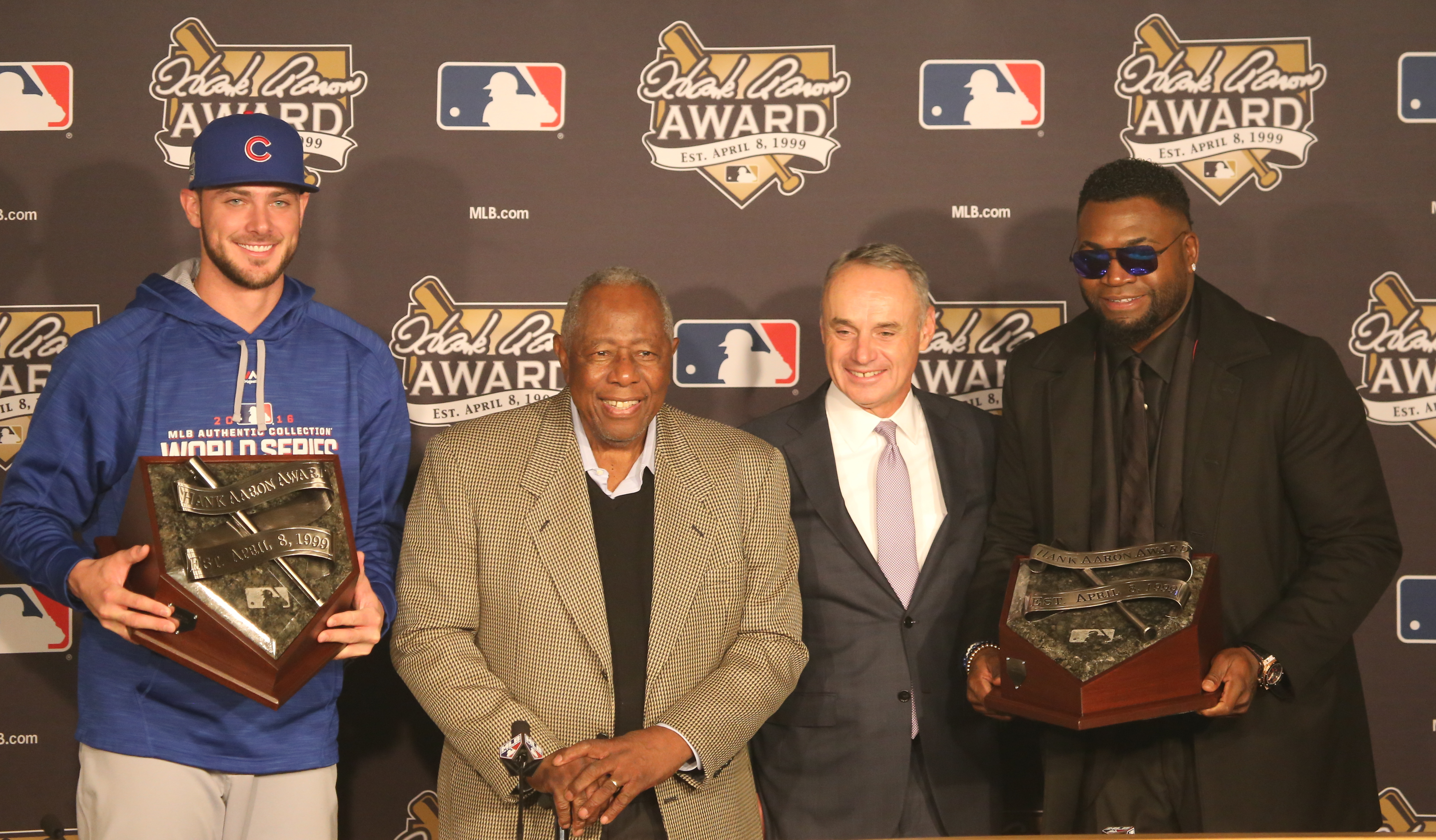
Bryant (far left) and David Ortiz (far right) with Hank Aaron (center left) and commissioner Rob Manfred (center right) after receiving the 2016 Hank Aaron Award

- ABCA College Player of the Year (2013)
- Baseball America College Player of the Year Award (2013)
- Baseball America Major League Rookie of the Year (2015)
- Baseball America Minor League Player of the Year (2014)
- Collegiate Baseball Player of the Year (2013)
- 2× College Baseball All-America Team (2012, 2013)
- Dick Howser Trophy (2013)
- Esurance MLB Award for Best Rookie (2015)
- Golden Spikes Award (2013)
- Joe Bauman Home Run Award (2014)
- 4× MLB All-Star (2015, 2016, 2019, 2021)
- MLB Player of the Month (August 2016)
- 2× MLB Rookie of the Month (May and August 2015)
- National League (NL) Hank Aaron Award (2016)
- NL Most Valuable Player (2016)
- NL Rookie of the Year (2015)
- Players Choice Award for NL Outstanding Rookie (2015)
- The Sporting News National League Rookie of the Year (2015)
- USA Today Minor League Player of the Year Award (2014)
- World Series champion (2016)

== Personal life ==
Bryant was named his high school's salutatorian, but allowed a classmate to take the role instead when he found out how badly she wanted it. In college, he majored in biology before switching to finance.

Bryant's father, Mike, played in minor league baseball for the Boston Red Sox organization. Mike owned a patio furniture store but sold it in order to get a job that permitted him to coach his son.

Bryant and fellow baseball players Bryce Harper and Joey Gallo grew up as acquaintances in the Las Vegas area and began playing baseball with each other at the age of 9. Bryant and Harper's friendly competition was displayed in the May 2015 series against the Washington Nationals at Wrigley Field, when they greeted each other for the first time in the Major Leagues.

Bryant proposed to long-time girlfriend Jessica Delp in December 2015. They both grew up in Las Vegas and had dated since they were 14. They were married on January 7, 2017, with one of the groomsmen being Bryant's teammate, Anthony Rizzo. They have three children: a son who was born in April 2020; and twin boys who were born on July 11, 2022. They reside in the Denver area.

== See also ==
- 2013 College Baseball All-America Team
- Chicago Cubs award winners and league leaders
- List of Major League Baseball annual runs scored leaders
- List of people from Las Vegas
- List of University of San Diego people

Awards and achievements
Preceded by Daniel Murphy	National League Player of the Month; August 2016	Succeeded by Freddie Freeman
