= Jarred Kelenic =

American baseball player (born 1999)

Free agent
- Outfielder
- Born: July 16, 1999 (age 27); Waukesha, Wisconsin, U.S.
- Bats: Left Throws: Left

MLB debut
- May 13, 2021, for the Seattle Mariners

MLB statistics (through 2026 season)
- Batting average: .211
- Home runs: 50
- Runs batted in: 162
- Stats at Baseball Reference

Teams
- Seattle Mariners (2021–2023); Atlanta Braves (2024–2025); Chicago White Sox (2026); Texas Rangers (2026)
Medals
Men's baseball
Representing United States
U-18 Baseball World Cup
| Gold medal – first place | 2017 Thunder Bay | Team |

Jarred Robert Kelenic (/ˈkɛlnɪk/ KEL-nik; born July 16, 1999) is an American professional baseball outfielder who is a free agent. He has previously played in Major League Baseball (MLB) for the Seattle Mariners, Atlanta Braves, Chicago White Sox, and Texas Rangers. He was drafted in the first round of the 2018 MLB draft by the New York Mets and was traded to the Mariners later that year. He made his MLB debut in 2021 with the Mariners. Seattle traded him to Atlanta after the 2023 season.

== Amateur career ==
Kelenic attended Waukesha West High School in Waukesha, Wisconsin. In 2016, he was named MVP of USA Baseball's U-18 team that won gold at the Pan American Games. He committed to play college baseball at the University of Louisville.

In July 2017, Kelenic participated in the High School Home Run Derby at Marlins Park. Later that month, he played in the Under Armour All-America Baseball Game. He again played for the U.S. under-18 team in 2017 and won a gold medal for the second consecutive year.

== Professional career ==
=== New York Mets ===
Kelenic was considered one of the top prospects for the 2018 Major League Baseball draft. He was drafted sixth overall by the New York Mets, and signed for $4.5 million. He was assigned to the Rookie League Gulf Coast League Mets before being promoted to the Rookie League Kingsport Mets of the Rookie-level Appalachian League in July. In 56 games between the two clubs, he slashed .286/.371/.468 with six home runs, 42 RBI, and 15 stolen bases.

=== Seattle Mariners ===
==== 2018–2020 ====
On December 3, 2018, the Mets traded Kelenic, Jay Bruce, Gerson Bautista, Justin Dunn and Anthony Swarzak to the Seattle Mariners in exchange for Robinson Canó, Edwin Díaz, and $20 million. Kelenic began 2019 with the West Virginia Power of the Single-A South Atlantic League. Kelenic was promoted to the Modesto Nuts of the High-A California League in May. Kelenic was named to the 2019 All-Star Futures Game. In August, he was promoted to the Arkansas Travelers of the Double-A Texas League. Over 117 games between the three clubs, he slashed .291/.364/.540 with 23 home runs, 68 RBIs, and twenty stolen bases. He was selected to play in the Arizona Fall League for the Peoria Javelinas following the season. Kelenic did not appear in a minor league game in 2020 due to the cancellation of the minor league season due to the COVID-19 pandemic and spent the summer at Seattle's alternate site in Tacoma. Throughout his minor league career, Kelenic was ranked highly by prospect evaluators, with both MLB.com and Baseball America ranking him as the 11th-best prospect in baseball in 2020 and the fourth-best in 2021.

==== 2021 ====
In February 2021, Kelenic stated that the Mariners had kept him in the minor leagues during the 2020 season because he had refused to sign a contract extension, as a form of service time manipulation. His comments occurred after a video of Mariners CEO Kevin Mather speaking to a Rotary club was posted online. Mather indicated that Kelenic and fellow Mariners prospect Logan Gilbert would start the 2021 season in the minor leagues, keeping them under team control for an extra year before free agency. After the comments became public, Kelenic said that the Mariners had offered him a contract extension and had told him multiple times that he would have appeared with the major league team in 2020 had he signed it. Instead, Kelenic spent the 2020 season at the team's alternate training site. In response, Mariners general manager Jerry Dipoto said that Kelenic was not yet ready to play on the major league team. Mather resigned the day after his speech at the Rotary Club, which also included comments disparaging other players. Despite impressing during spring training, with two home runs and a 1.256 OPS in nine games, Kelenic was assigned to the Tacoma Rainiers of the Triple-A West League to begin the 2021 season.

On May 13, Kelenic was added to the 40-man roster and promoted to the major leagues for the first time. He made his debut that day as the starting left fielder against the Cleveland Indians, going hitless in four at-bats. The next day, on May 14, Kelenic recorded his first MLB hit, a two-run home run in the bottom of the third inning for an estimated distance of 403 feet. On June 7, amid an 0-for-39 slump, he was sent down to Triple-A. Later that month, Kelenic was selected to play in the All-Star Futures Game for the second consecutive year. Kelenic was called back up to the major leagues after the All-Star break and stayed on the roster for the remainder of the season, contributing to the Mariners' ultimately unsuccessful late-season playoff push. He finished the 2021 season batting .181/.265/.350 with 14 home runs and 43 RBIs in 93 games for Seattle.

==== 2022 ====
Prior to the 2022 season, due to his performance during the tail end of the Mariners' 2021 season and his previous high prospect status, Kelenic was viewed as a candidate for a breakout season. He began the season in the majors. In May, he was optioned to Tacoma after hitting .140/.219/.291 over 30 games. He hit well in 54 games for Tacoma, slashing .288/.363/.540. He was then called back up to the majors on July 31, replacing Julio Rodríguez, who had been placed on the injured list after getting hit by a pitch. During his short 10-game stint with the Mariners, he had just two hits in 27 plate appearances before being optioned once again to Tacoma.

Kelenic was once again called up in late September, again hitting with power in the final month of the regular season as the Mariners clinched their first postseason appearance since 2001. He hit 3 home runs and batted .180 in 14 games at the end of the season. He batted 2-for-17 in the postseason, playing in all five Mariners games. After his first two seasons, Kelenic had a career batting average of .168, second to John Vukovich for lowest in history for batters with more than 550 plate appearances.

==== 2023 ====
During the offseason, Kelenic worked on adjusting his approach at the plate to one that would be more suitable for hitting major-league pitching, especially breaking balls, which he greatly struggled hitting while he was in the majors. Before the 2023 season, Kelenic was again viewed as a breakout candidate because of his performance after his final call-up, as well as the ban on the infield shift that was introduced in 2023.

In spring training, Kelenic flourished, slashing .353/.389/.706 with four home runs in 54 plate appearances. Kelenic began the season on the Opening Day roster, with the intent of platooning in left field with the newly acquired A. J. Pollock. Kelenic continued his spring training success into the major league season, hitting well enough to earn starts against left-handed pitchers and become the everyday left fielder. On April 12, Kelenic hit a 482-foot home run that landed in the second tier of the center field bleachers at Wrigley Field, the longest regular-season home run recorded at Wrigley and the longest by a Mariner during the Statcast era (since 2015).

On July 20, Kelenic broke his foot after kicking a water cooler during a game against the Minnesota Twins. He was activated off of the injured list on September 11. Kelenic finished the season batting .253/.327/.419 with 49 RBI, all career highs, as well as 11 home runs.

=== Atlanta Braves ===
On December 3, 2023, the Mariners traded Kelenic, Marco Gonzales, and Evan White to the Atlanta Braves in exchange for Jackson Kowar and Cole Phillips. Atlanta initially announced that Kelenic would be their starting left fielder, but after a poor spring training, slashing .143/.200/.232, Adam Duvall was acquired to platoon with Kelenic in left. However, after Duvall struggled and injuries plagued the Braves' outfield, Kelenic became the starting everyday center fielder, and took the leadoff spot in the lineup. Kelenic finished the 2024 season with a slash line of .231/.286/.393.

In 2025, Kelenic got off to a slow start, resulting in him being sent back to the Triple-A Gwinnett Stripers on April 28. He ultimately played in only 24 games for Atlanta during the regular season, hitting .167/.231/.300 with two home runs and two RBI. On October 1, Kelenic was removed from the 40-man roster and sent outright to Gwinnett; he opted for free agency the following day.

=== Chicago White Sox ===
On December 31, 2025, Kelenic signed a minor league contract with the Chicago White Sox. He was assigned to the Triple-A Charlotte Knights to begin the regular season, hitting .202 with six home runs and 18 RBI over 26 games. On April 29, 2026, the White Sox selected Kelenic's contract, adding him to their active roster. He made 19 appearances for Chicago, batting .226/.305/.321 with one home run and four RBI. Kelenic was designated for assignment by the White Sox on May 25. He elected free agency after clearing waivers on May 30.

=== Texas Rangers ===
On June 1, 2026, Kelenic signed a minor league contract with the Texas Rangers organization. Texas selected Kelenic's contract to the active roster on June 19. In seven appearances for the Rangers, he went 1-for-8 (.125) with two walks. Texas designated Kelenic for assignment on June 29. He elected free agency after clearing waivers on July 1. Two days later, Kelenic re-signed with Texas on a minor league contract. He was released by the organization on July 26. On July 29, Kelenic again returned to the organization on a new minor league contract. On August 11, the Rangers added Kelenic back to their active roster. After going 3–for–12 (.250) with two RBI over 10 appearances, Kelenic was designated for assignment again on August 23. He cleared waivers and elected free agency on August 26.

=== New York Yankees ===
On August 28, 2026, Kelenic signed a minor league contract with the New York Yankees. In 19 games with Triple-A Scranton/Wilkes-Barre Railriders he batted .200/.250/.306 with 2 home runs, 10 RBIs and 4 stolen bases. He elected free agency on November 2.
