= Tony Kemp (baseball) =

American baseball player (born 1991)

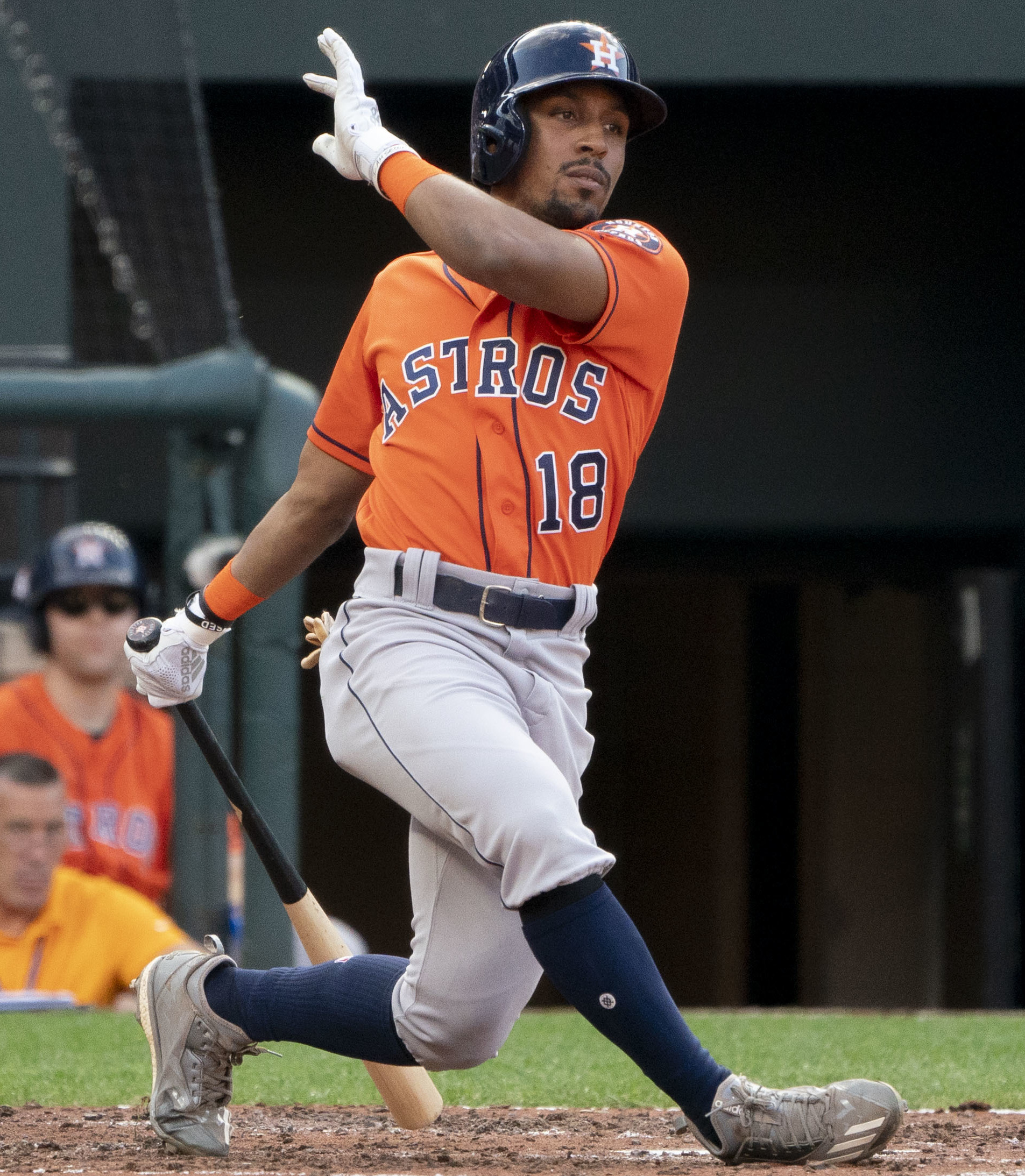
- Kemp with the Houston Astros in 2018
- Second baseman / Left fielder
- Born: October 31, 1991 (age 34); Franklin, Tennessee, U.S.
- Batted: Left Threw: Right

MLB debut
- May 17, 2016, for the Houston Astros

Last MLB appearance
- April 9, 2024, for the Baltimore Orioles

MLB statistics
- Batting average: .237
- Home runs: 35
- Runs batted in: 184
- Stats at Baseball Reference

Teams
- Houston Astros (2016–2019); Chicago Cubs (2019); Oakland Athletics (2020–2023); Baltimore Orioles (2024)

Career highlights and awards
- World Series champion (2017)

Anthony Allen Kemp (born October 31, 1991) is an American former professional baseball second baseman and left fielder. Between 2016 and 2024, he played nine seasons in Major League Baseball (MLB) with the Houston Astros, Chicago Cubs, Oakland Athletics, and Baltimore Orioles.

Kemp played college baseball at Vanderbilt University. The Houston Astros selected Kemp in the fifth round of the 2013 MLB draft and he made his MLB debut with the Astros in 2016. Kemp won the 2017 World Series with the Astros. After he was traded to the Cubs during the 2019 season, Kemp played for the Athletics from 2020 through 2023 and the Orioles in 2024.

== Career ==
=== Amateur career ===
Kemp graduated from Centennial High School in Franklin, Tennessee. He attended Vanderbilt University, where he played college baseball for the Vanderbilt Commodores baseball team. In 2011, Kemp was named the Southeastern Conference's (SEC) Freshman of the Year and First Team All-SEC. He was a key contributor on the 2011 team, which was the first Vanderbilt baseball team to make it to the College World Series. In summer 2011, he played summer league baseball for the Rochester Honkers of the Northwoods League. In 2012, he played with the Cotuit Kettleers of the Cape Cod Baseball League. He was named an All-American and the SEC Baseball Player of the Year in 2013.

=== Houston Astros ===
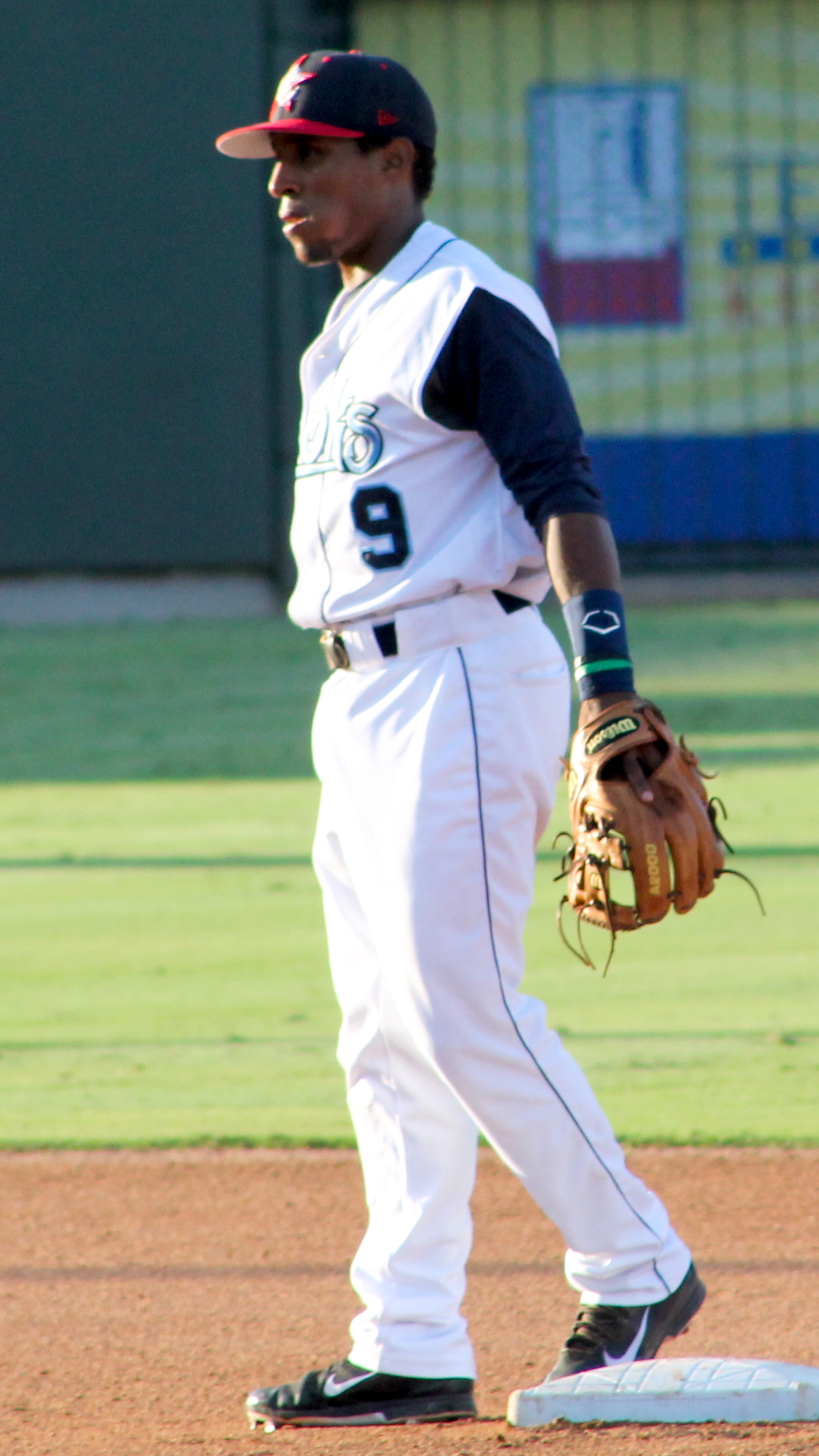
Kemp with the Corpus Christi Hooks in 2014

The Houston Astros of Major League Baseball (MLB) selected Kemp in the fifth round of the 2013 MLB draft. In 2015, Kemp began the season with the Corpus Christi Hooks of the Double–A Texas League. He received a midseason promotion to the Fresno Grizzlies of the Triple–A Pacific Coast League, and appeared in the 2015 All-Star Futures Game.

Kemp began the 2016 season with Fresno, and was promoted to the major leagues on May 16, 2016. He was optioned to Fresno on June 25, when A. J. Reed was called up for his debut. On August 7, Kemp was recalled to the Astros. After center fielder Carlos Gómez was designated for assignment, Kemp and Jake Marisnick platooned in centerfield. In 2016 with the Astros, he batted .217/.296/.325 with one home run in 136 plate appearances while playing primarily left field.

On March 19, 2017, Kemp was optioned back to Fresno. On April 27, the Astros promoted Kemp to the major leagues to replace injured Teoscar Hernández. On May 1, the Astros optioned him back down as Marisnick was activated off of the disabled list. On September 2, Reed was called up to the Astros and played in their doubleheader against the Mets, their first home game after Hurricane Harvey. In 17 games with the Astros, Kemp batted .216/.256/.243 with four RBI while playing primarily left field. The Astros finished the season with a 101-61 record and eventually won the 2017 World Series, their first ever championship title. Kemp did not participate in any playoff action, but was still on the 40-man roster at the time, and won his first championship title.

To begin the 2018 season, the Astros optioned Kemp back to Fresno. He was called up on May 16, 2018, to replace Marisnick. In the 2018 season, Kemp played in 97 games for the Astros, batting .263/.351/.392 with six home runs and 30 RBI, playing primarily in left field. He was mocked by the Fenway Park crowd and organist during the second game of the 2018 American League Championship Series (ALCS) when he took an extended period of time to return to the batter's box after a foul ball. Following the third game of the 2018 ALCS, Kemp received wide sports media coverage for making a leaping catch against the left field wall on a ball hit by Steve Pearce. The Red Sox challenged the catch at the wall, since it sounded like the ball hit the wall first. After further review, they announced the catch as confirmed, meaning the MLB replay crew in New York saw conclusive evidence of the catch. In game four, Kemp hit a fourth inning solo home run off Rick Porcello after only hitting six homers during the regular season.

On July 26, 2019, Kemp was designated for assignment by the Astros in order to clear roster space for the activation of Carlos Correa. His 2019 season with the Astros ended with a .227/.308/.417 line over 163 at-bats, while he had a career high with seven home runs in 66 games, prior to being traded.

=== Chicago Cubs ===
On July 31, 2019, the Astros traded Kemp to the Chicago Cubs for Martín Maldonado. In 2019 with the Cubs, he batted .183/.258/.305 with one home run in 82 at-bats.

=== Oakland Athletics ===
On January 13, 2020, the Cubs traded Kemp to the Oakland Athletics for minor league first baseman Alfonso Rivas. In 2020 for the Athletics, Kemp slashed .247/.363/.301 with no home runs and four RBI in 49 games. After the 2020 season, Kemp and the Athletics signed a $1.05 million contract for the 2021 season, avoiding salary arbitration. In 2021, he slashed .279/.382/.418 with 8 home runs and 37 RBIs in 131 games. His hard-hit percentage of 21.9% was, however, though the highest of his career, in the bottom 2% of the league, and his barrel percentage was in the bottom 2% of the league.

Kemp agreed to a $2.25 million salary with the Athletics for the 2022 season. In 2022, he batted .235/.307/.334 in 497 at bats. He had the lowest average exit velocity of all major league batters, at 84.4 mph, and the lowest percentage of hard-hit balls, at 14.9%.

On January 13, 2023, Kemp signed a one-year, $3.725 million contract with the Athletics, avoiding salary arbitration. He played in 124 games for the Athletics, hitting .209/.303/.304 with 5 home runs, 27 RBI, 15 stolen bases.

=== Baltimore Orioles ===
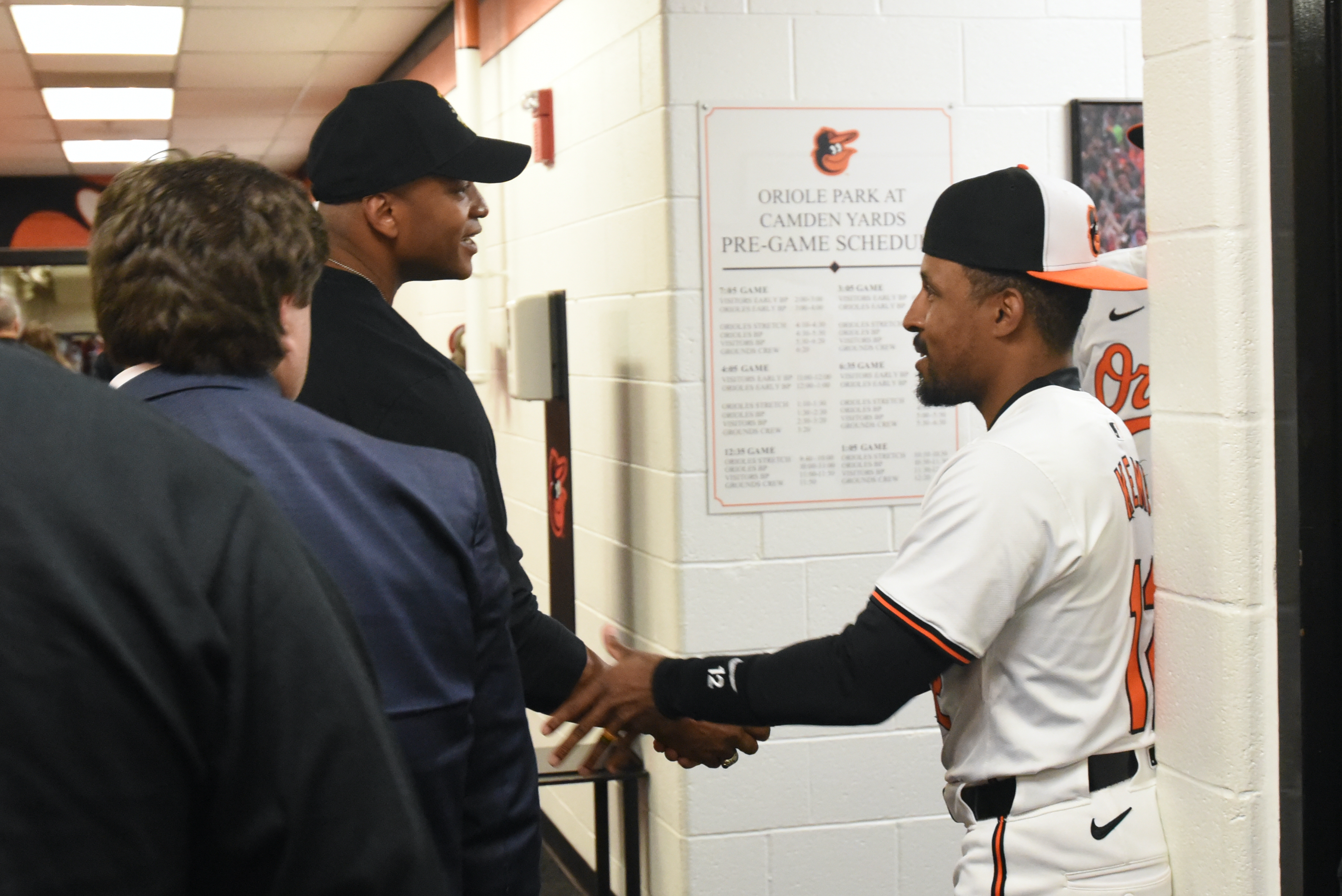
Kemp shakes hands with Maryland Governor Wes Moore, 2024

On February 23, 2024, Kemp signed a minor league contract with the Cincinnati Reds. He failed to win a spot on the major league roster during spring training and was released on March 19.

Kemp signed a one–year, $1 million major league contract with the Baltimore Orioles on March 26. In 10 plate appearances for Baltimore, Kemp walked once and did not record a hit. The Orioles designated him for assignment on April 10 following the promotion of Jackson Holliday. He elected free agency on April 13.

=== Minnesota Twins ===
On April 16, 2024, Kemp signed a minor league contract with the Minnesota Twins. In 46 games for the Triple–A St. Paul Saints, he batted .279/.358/.436 with six home runs, 26 RBI, and four stolen bases. On July 1, Kemp exercised the opt–out clause in his contract and was granted his release by the Twins.

=== Cincinnati Reds ===
On July 9, 2024, Kemp signed a minor league contract with the Cincinnati Reds. In 35 games for the Triple–A Louisville Bats, he batted .237/.338/.364 with three home runs, 17 RBI, and four stolen bases. Kemp was released by the Reds organization on August 30.

=== Retirement ===
Kemp announced his retirement from professional baseball on May 15, 2025. In 739 games across nine MLB seasons, Kemp finished his career hitting .237 with 35 home runs and 184 RBI.

== Personal life ==
Kemp's wife, Michelle (née Chieng), is of Chinese descent, the daughter of a Canadian mother and a Malaysian father. They met during high school and have two daughters.

== See also ==
- 2013 College Baseball All-America Team
