= 2013 College Baseball All-America Team =

This is a list of college baseball players named first team All-Americans for the 2013 NCAA Division I baseball season. From 2011 to 2014, there were five generally recognized All-America selectors for baseball: the American Baseball Coaches Association, Baseball America, Collegiate Baseball Newspaper, the National Collegiate Baseball Writers Association, and Perfect Game. In order to be considered a "consensus" All-American, a player must have been selected by at least three of these.

== Key ==
A	American Baseball Coaches Association
B	Baseball America
C	Collegiate Baseball Newspaper
N	National Collegiate Baseball Writers Association
P	Perfect Game
	Member of the National College Baseball Hall of Fame
	Consensus All-American – selected by all five organizations
	Consensus All-American – selected by three or four organizations

== All-Americans ==
Position	Name	School	#	A	B	C	N	P	Other awards and honors
Starting pitcher	Mark Appel	Stanford	4	✓	—	✓	✓	✓	First overall pick in the 2013 MLB draft
Starting pitcher	Tyler Beede	Vanderbilt	1	—	—	—	✓	—	
Starting pitcher	Kerry Doane	East Tennessee State	1	—	—	✓	—	—	
Starting pitcher	Kent Emanuel	North Carolina	1	—	—	✓	—	—	
Starting pitcher	Thomas Eshelman	Cal State Fullerton	2	—	✓	✓	—	—	
Starting pitcher	Jonathan Gray	Oklahoma	4	✓	✓	—	✓	✓	National Pitcher of the Year
Starting pitcher	Kyle McGowin	Savannah State	1	—	—	—	✓	—	
Starting pitcher	Andrew Moore	Oregon State	2	✓	✓	—	—	—	
Starting pitcher	Aaron Nola	LSU	5	✓	✓	✓	✓	✓	
Starting pitcher	Carlos Rodon	NC State	1	—	—	—	—	✓	
Relief pitcher	David Berg	UCLA	4	✓	✓	✓	✓	—	Stopper of the Year
Relief pitcher	Nick Burdi	Louisville	1	—	—	—	—	✓	
Relief pitcher	Jonathan Holder	Mississippi State	2	—	—	✓	✓	—	
Relief pitcher	Jimmie Sherfy	Oregon	1	—	—	—	✓	—	
Catcher	Mitch Garver	New Mexico	1	—	—	✓	—	—	
Catcher	Kyle Schwarber	Indiana	2	—	—	—	✓	✓	
Catcher	Stuart Turner	Ole Miss	2	✓	✓	—	—	—	Johnny Bench Award
First baseman	Mason Katz	LSU	1	—	—	—	✓	—	
First baseman	D. J. Peterson	New Mexico	4	✓	✓	✓	—	✓	
First baseman	Jimmy Yezzo	Delaware	1	—	—	✓	—	—	
Second baseman	Tony Kemp	Vanderbilt	5	✓	✓	✓	✓	✓	
Shortstop	Alex Bregman	LSU	3	✓	✓	—	—	✓	Brooks Wallace Award
Shortstop	Hunter Dozier	Stephen F. Austin	3	✓	—	✓	✓	—	
Third baseman	Kris Bryant	San Diego	5	✓	✓	✓	✓	✓	Dick Howser Trophy Golden Spikes Award ABCA Player of the Year Baseball America Player of the Year Collegiate Baseball Player of the Year
Outfielder	Forrestt Allday	Central Arkansas	1	✓	—	—	—	—	
Outfielder	Danny Collins	Troy	2	—	—	✓	✓	—	
Outfielder	Michael Conforto	Oregon State	2	✓	—	—	—	✓	
Outfielder	Daniel Palka	Georgia Tech	3	—	✓	—	✓	✓	
Outfielder	Mike Papi	Virginia	2	✓	✓	—	—	—	
Outfielder	Justin Parr	Illinois	2	—	—	✓	✓	—	
Outfielder	Hunter Renfroe	Mississippi State	5	✓	✓	✓	✓	✓	
Outfielder	Mike Tauchman	Bradley	1	✓	—	—	—	—	
Designated hitter	C. K. Irby	Samford	1	✓	—	—	—	—	
Designated hitter / 3B	Colin Moran	North Carolina	3	✓	✓	—	—	✓	
Designated hitter	Matt Oberste	Oklahoma	1	—	—	—	✓	—	
Utility player	Michael Lorenzen	Cal State Fullerton	5	✓	✓	✓	✓	✓	

== See also ==
- List of college baseball awards
