= Daniel Palka =

American baseball player (born 1991)

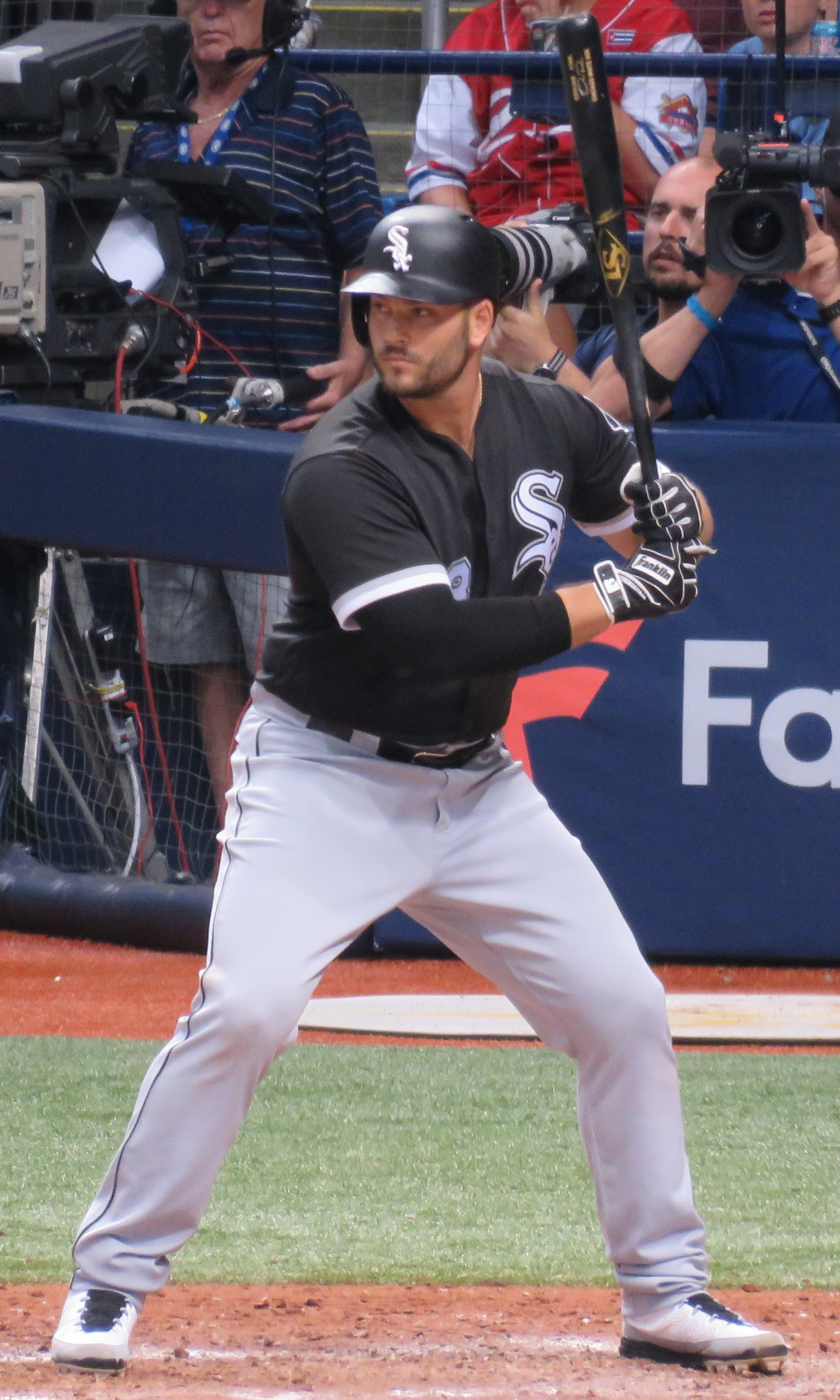
- Palka batting for the Chicago White Sox in 2018
- Outfielder
- Born: October 28, 1991 (age 35); Greenville, South Carolina, U.S.
- Batted: Left Threw: Left

Professional debut
- MLB: April 25, 2018, for the Chicago White Sox
- KBO: August 23, 2020, for the Samsung Lions

Last appearance
- MLB: September 29, 2019, for the Chicago White Sox
- KBO: October 30, 2020, for the Samsung Lions

MLB statistics
- Batting average: .218
- Home runs: 29
- Runs batted in: 71

KBO statistics
- Batting average: .209
- Home runs: 8
- Runs batted in: 23
- Stats at Baseball Reference

Teams
- Chicago White Sox (2018–2019); Samsung Lions (2020)

Daniel Bennett Palka (born October 28, 1991) is an American former professional baseball outfielder. He previously played in Major League Baseball (MLB) for the Chicago White Sox and in the KBO League for the Samsung Lions.

== Playing career ==
=== Amateur ===
Palka attended Greer High School in Greer, South Carolina. He was drafted by the Philadelphia Phillies in the 19th round of the 2010 Major League Baseball draft. He did not sign with the Phillies and attended Georgia Tech, where he played college baseball. In 2011 and 2012, he played collegiate summer baseball with the Wareham Gatemen of the Cape Cod Baseball League, where he was the West division MVP of the league's all-star game in 2012. Palka's junior year finished with him being Georgia Tech's first position player All American since Matt Wieters.

=== Arizona Diamondbacks ===
Palka was drafted by the Arizona Diamondbacks in the third round (88th overall) of the 2013 Major League Baseball draft. Palka made his professional debut with the Missoula Osprey and was later promoted to the Hillsboro Hops. He played for the South Bend Silver Hawks in 2014 and the Visalia Rawhide in 2015. After the 2015 season he played in the Arizona Fall League.

=== Minnesota Twins ===
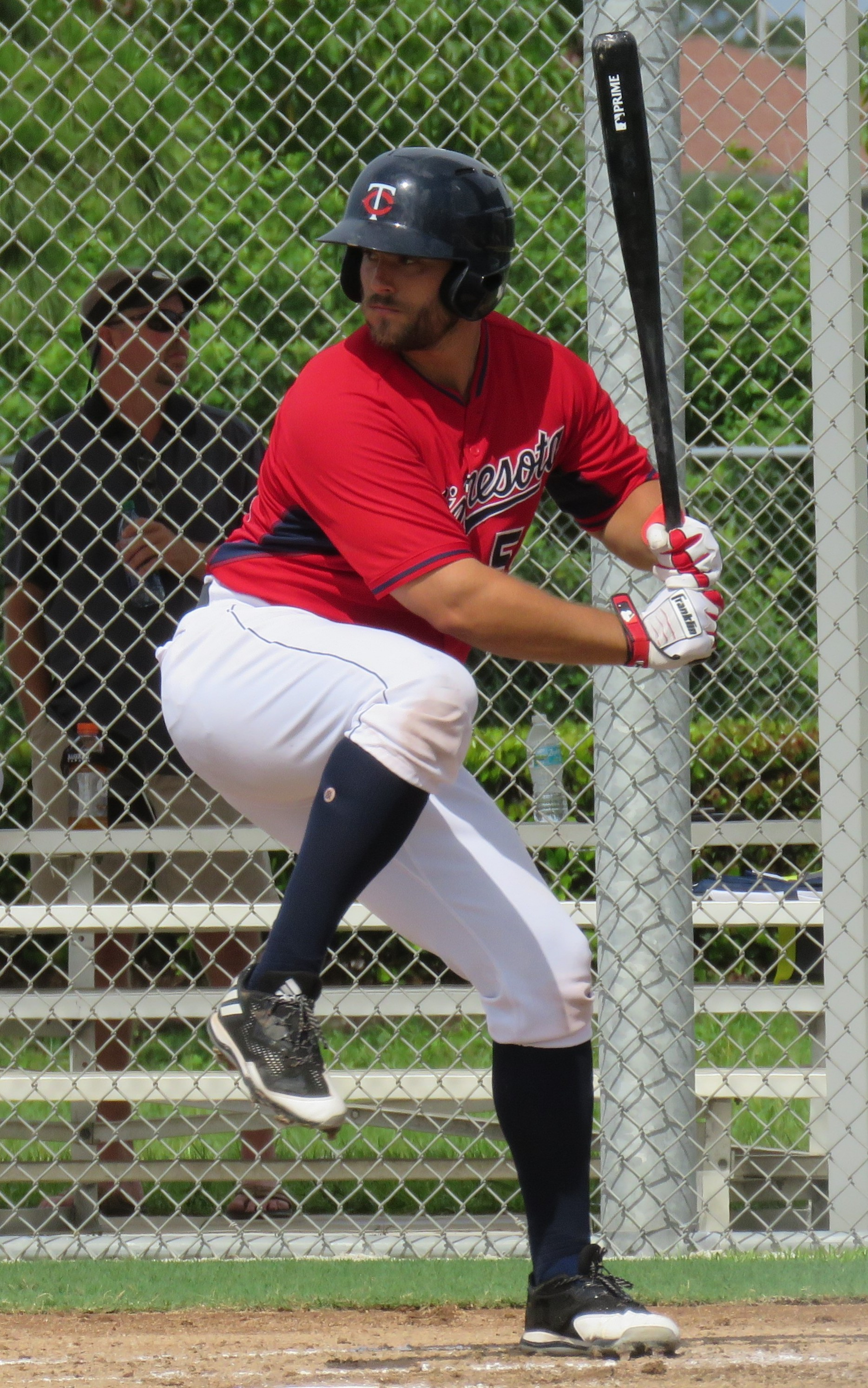
Palka batting for the Minnesota Twins organization in 2015

On November 10, 2015, Palka was traded from the Diamondbacks to the Minnesota Twins for Chris Herrmann. He started 2016 with the Chattanooga Lookouts and was promoted to the Rochester Red Wings in July. Palka finished 2016 with a combined .254 batting average, 34 home runs and 90 RBI's between both clubs. The Twins added him to their 40-man roster after the season. In 2017, he played for Rochester, posting a .274 batting average with 11 home runs and 42 RBIs in 84 games.

=== Chicago White Sox ===
He was claimed off waivers by the Chicago White Sox on November 3, 2017. Palka was called up to the Major Leagues on April 24, 2018, and made his major league debut the next day. Palka led the 2018 Chicago White Sox with 27 home runs and finished fifth in AL Rookie of the Year voting. He began the following season on a 0-32 slump before snapping it on April 17, 2019. He was sent down to the Triple-A Charlotte Knights the following day. He was named International League Player of the Week from May 13–20. For the rest of the season, he led the Knights with 27 home runs.

On November 21, 2019, Palka was designated for assignment by the White Sox. He cleared waivers and was sent outright to Charlotte on November 25.

=== Samsung Lions ===
On July 29, 2020, Palka left the White Sox organization to sign with the Samsung Lions of the KBO League. In 51 games for Samsung, Palka slashed .209/.272/.367 with eight home runs and 23 RBI. He became a free agent following the season.

=== Washington Nationals ===
On April 16, 2021, Palka signed a minor league contract with the Washington Nationals organization. Palka spent the 2021 season with the Triple-A Rochester Red Wings. He played in 106 games, hitting .256 with 18 home runs and 58 RBI. Palka became a free agent following the season.

=== New York Mets ===
On December 13, 2021, Palka signed a minor league contract with the New York Mets. He was assigned to the Triple-A Syracuse Mets to begin the 2022 season. Palka appeared in 109 games for Syracuse, slashing .263/.344/.506 with 26 home runs and 79 RBI. He elected free agency following the season on November 10, 2022.

=== Boston Red Sox ===
On February 24, 2023, Palka signed a minor league contract with the Boston Red Sox organization. In 79 games for the Triple–A Worcester Red Sox, he batted .233/.309/.410 with 12 home runs and 48 RBI. On July 30, Palka was released by Boston.

=== New York Mets (second stint) ===
On August 26, 2023, Palka signed a minor league contract with the New York Mets organization. In 23 games for the Triple–A Syracuse Mets, he batted .250/.320/.455 with 5 home runs and 12 RBI. Palka elected free agency following the season on November 6.

On January 9, 2024, Palka signed with the Guerreros de Oaxaca of the Mexican League. However, he did not make the Opening Day roster after asking for his release. on April 10, 2024.

=== Algodoneros de Unión Laguna ===
On May 17, 2024, Palka signed with the Algodoneros de Unión Laguna of the Mexican League. He was placed on the reserve list on July 19 after suffering a blood clot in his great saphenous vein, which later traveled to his lungs causing a bilateral pulmonary embolism. In 41 games, he hit .298/.372/.553 with 10 home runs and 35 RBIs. He was forced to retire from professional baseball following the health concerns found during the 2024 season.

== Coaching career ==
Following his retirement, Palka assisted his alma mater, Georgia Tech, during the 2025 season. In 2026, he was hired as an assistant coach for the University of Rhode Island.

== See also ==
- 2013 College Baseball All-America Team
