= Mike Papi =

American baseball player (born 1992)

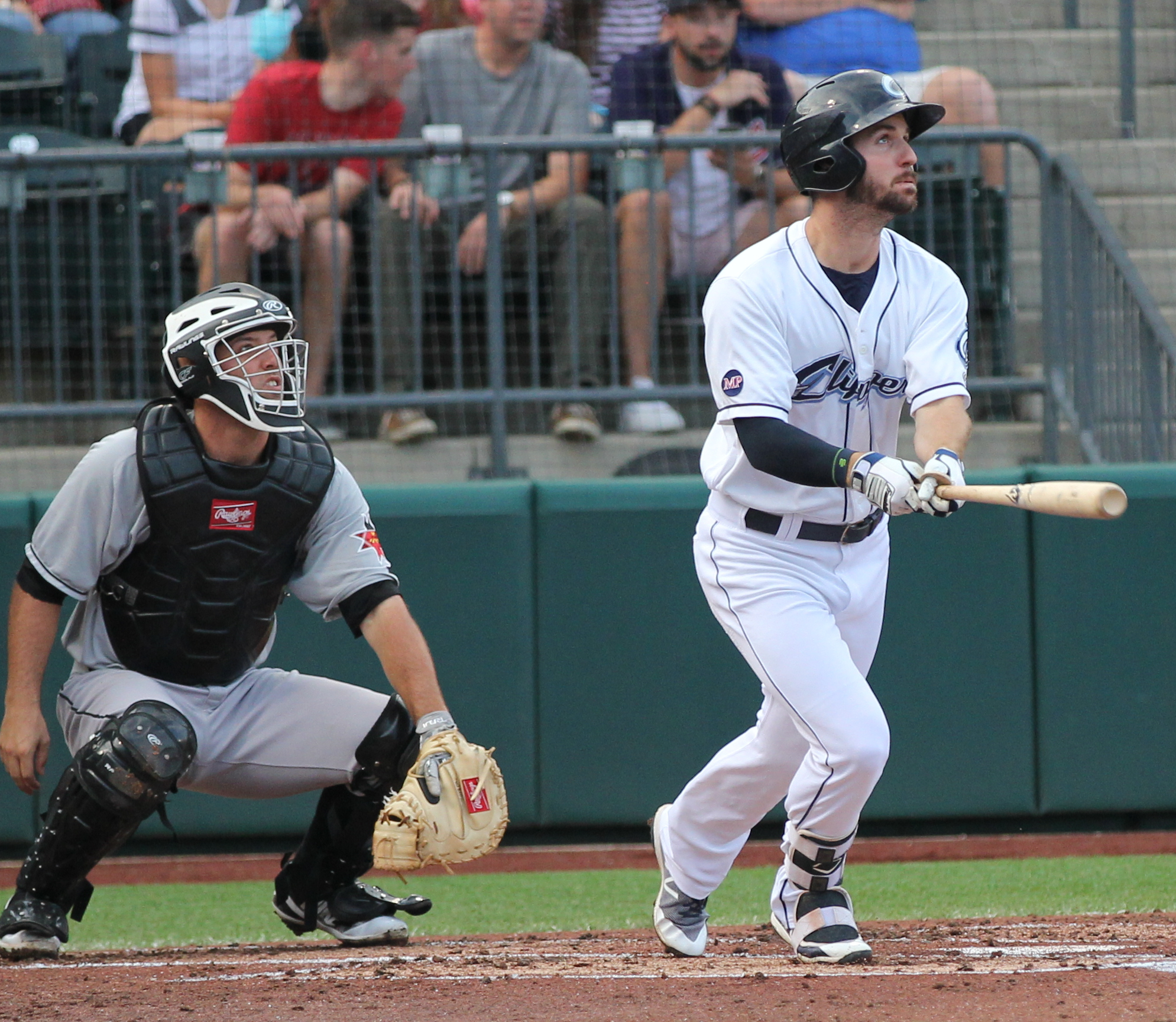
- Papi playing for the Columbus Clippers in 2018
- Outfielder
- Born: September 19, 1992 (age 32); Tunkhannock, Pennsylvania, U.S.
- Bats: Left Throws: Right

Michael Joseph Papi (born September 19, 1992) is an American former professional baseball outfielder. Papi attended the University of Virginia, where he played college baseball for the Virginia Cavaliers. In his collegiate career, he was named an All-American. He played professionally in the Cleveland Indians organization.

== Career ==
Papi attended Tunkhannock Area High School in Tunkhannock, Pennsylvania. He played for the school's baseball team, competing in the Wyoming Valley Conference. With Tunkhannock, Papi was a member of two consecutive district champions, and his 2011 team reached the state championship. The Los Angeles Angels of Anaheim selected Papi in the 30th round of the 2011 Major League Baseball draft, but he opted not to sign with the Angels.

Papi enrolled at the University of Virginia, and played college baseball for the Virginia Cavaliers baseball team. In 2013, his sophomore year, Papi led the Atlantic Coast Conference (ACC) with a .381 batting average. Papi was selected to the First All-ACC team and was named an All-American by the American Baseball Coaches Association and Baseball America. He was named a preseason All-American by the National Collegiate Baseball Writers Association in 2014.

=== Cleveland Indians ===
The Cleveland Indians selected Papi with the 38th overall selection of the 2014 Major League Baseball draft. Papi signed with the Indians, receiving a $1.25 million signing bonus, and made his professional debut with the Low-A Mahoning Valley Scrappers. After two games with Mahoning Valley, the Indians promoted Papi to the Single-A Lake County Captains. He got off to a slow start with Lake County, and finished the Lake County season with a .178 batting average. Papi was assigned to the High-A Lynchburg Hillcats in 2015 and spent the whole season there, posting a .236 batting average with four home runs and 45 RBIs. He began the 2016 season with Lynchburg and was promoted to the Double-A Akron RubberDucks in June. Papi ended 2016 with a combined .231 batting average, 15 home runs and 58 RBIs in 118 games between both teams. In 2017, he played for both Akron and the Triple-A Columbus Clippers, batting a combined .258 with 12 home runs and 55 RBIs in 124 games between both clubs. He spent the 2018 season with the Clippers, hitting .247 with seven home runs and 26 RBIs in 83 games.

In 2019, Papi appeared in only 27 games for Triple-A Columbus, batting .202/.290/.250 with no home runs and 10 RBI. He did not play in a game for the organization in 2020 due to the cancellation of the minor league season because of the COVID-19 pandemic. Papi was released by the Indians on May 29, 2020.

=== Gastonia Honey Hunters ===
On May 21, 2021, Papi signed with the Gastonia Honey Hunters of the Atlantic League of Professional Baseball. Papi played in 79 games for Gastonia, hitting .243/.327/.462 with 14 home runs, 60 RBI, and 8 stolen bases. He became a free agent following the season.

== Post-playing career ==
In 2023, Papi returned to the University of Virginia to earn his bachelor's degree.

== See also ==
- 2013 College Baseball All-America Team
