= List of University of San Diego people =

This is a list of notable present and former faculty, staff, and students of the University of San Diego (USD).

It is limited to those people for whom there is a Wikipedia article, or whose position makes it clear that they are unquestionably entitled to an article.

== Alumni ==
- Andrew Firestone, 1998 (BBA), Bachelor of Business Administration; entrepreneur, casino executive and sports promoter (MMA)
- Bob Maggiore, 1991 (BBA), Chief Marketing Officer at TaylorMade-Adidas
- Brooke Raboutou, 2023 (BA), Olympic sport climber
- Carlos Bustamante, 1969 (BA), Mayor of Tijuana
- Charles LiMandri, 1977 (BA), attorney who argued the Mount Soledad Cross case, the longest running First Amendment case in history
- Christopher Bauer, (BA), film, television, and theater actor
- Dave Camp, 1978 (JD), former U.S. Representative for Michigan's 10th congressional district from 1991 to 1993 and for Michigan's 4th congressional district from 1993 to 2015; chairman of the House Committee on Ways and Means from 2011–2015
- Linda Geary, 1982 (BA), painter, educator
- Dennis Secor, 1984 (BBA), CFO at Fossil Group
- Donald Gibb, 1977 (BA), actor. Revenge of the Nerds and Bloodsport
- Josh Hendrickson, 2019, pitcher in Major League Baseball
- Erik M. Ross, 1995 (MA), U.S. Navy Rear Admiral and 67th president of the Board of Inspection and Survey
- Eric Musselman, 1978 (BA), basketball coach; current head coach at the University of Nevada, Reno and former head coach of the Sacramento Kings and Golden State Warriors
- Edred Utomi, 2013 (B.Comm.), actor portraying Alexander Hamilton in Angelica National Tour of Hamilton
- Frances Townsend, 1984 (JD), former Homeland Security Advisor to United States President George W. Bush; TV personality
- Juan Vargas, 1983 (BA), U.S. Representative for California's 51st congressional district
- George Coker, 1976 (BA), retired United States Navy commander awarded the Navy Cross for extraordinary heroism as a prisoner of war during the Vietnam War
- Greg Sherman, 1992 (BBA), General Manager of NHL's Colorado Avalanche
- Heidi Watney, 2003 (BA), sportscaster for MLB Network
- Jocko Willink, (BA), former U.S. Navy lieutenant commander and SEAL, author, and podcaster.
- James Pazos, 2009–12, baseball player for the Philadelphia Phillies
- Jennifer Paredes, actress
- Jim Parsons, 2001 (MFA), actor, Emmy Award-winning actor for The Big Bang Theory
- John P. Dolan, 1985 (MA) Auxiliary Bishop of San Diego
- Jonny Kim, 2013 (BA), U.S. Navy lieutenant commander (and former SEAL), physician, and NASA astronaut.
- Josh Johnson, 2007 (BA), American football quarterback for the San Francisco 49ers
- Judith Keep, 1970 (JD), former United States district judge of the United States District Court for the Southern District of California
- Kris Bryant, 2011–13, baseball player for 2016 World Series champion Chicago Cubs, National League Rookie of the Year (2015) and Most Valuable Player (2016)
- Lamont Smith, 1998 (BA), American college basketball coach at the University of Texas at El Paso
- Lynn Schenk, 1970 (JD), former U.S. Representative for California's 49th congressional district, serving from 1993 to 1995
- Lorenzo Fertitta, 1991 (BBA), entrepreneur, casino executive and sports promoter (MMA)
- Lowell McAdam, 1983 (MBA), Chairman and CEO of Verizon Communications, a company he joined in 2000
- Mario Testino, 1975 (BA), Peruvian fashion and portrait photographer
- Mark Brnovich, 1991 (JD), Arizona Attorney General
- Matthew Dominick, 2005 (BS/BA), Naval Aviator and Astronaut Candidate
- Miguel Luis Villafuerte, 2012 (BA), Member of the Philippines House of Representatives from Camarines Sur 5th District, Former Governor of the Province of Camarines Sur, Philippines
- Michael Streit, 1975 (JD), former Iowa Supreme Court Justice
- Mike Brown, 1992 (BBA), American basketball associate head coach for the Golden State Warriors of the National Basketball Association (NBA)
- Monte Brem, 2000 (JD & MBA), founder and CEO of StepStone Group, private equity firm
- Robert Kardashian, 1967 (JD), lawyer for O. J. Simpson and father of reality show personalities Kourtney Kardashian, Kimberly "Kim" Kardashian, Khloé Kardashian Odom, and Robert Kardashian Jr., with his former wife Kris Jenner
- Rubina Feroze Bhatti, 2015 (PhD), Pakistani human rights activist
- Ryan Zinke, 2003 (MS), United States Secretary of the Interior
- Salvatore Cordileone, 1978 (JCD), Canon Law. Archbishop of San Francisco
- Sattam bin Abdulaziz Al Saud, 1965 (BA), and an honorary doctorate from USD in 1975; one of senior members of House of Saud; son of King Abdulaziz; 12th governor of Riyadh Province, Saudi Arabia
- Shaney Fink, volleyball player and Athletic Director at Seattle University
- Shelley Berkley, 1976 (JD), former U.S. Representative for Nevada's 1st congressional district, serving from 1999 to 2013
- Theo Epstein, 2000, (JD), President of Baseball Operations for the Chicago Cubs
- Thomas J. Barrack Jr., 1972 (JD), private equity real estate investor and the founder and executive chairman of Colony Capital
- Thomas Breitling, 1991 (BA), entrepreneur
- Thomas J. Whelan, 1961 (BA & 1965 JD), Senior United States district judge of the United States District Court for the Southern District of California
- Thomas O'Brien, 1993 (JD), United States Attorney for the Central District of California from October 2007 to September 2009
- Richard Wagener, 1967 (BS), engraver, printer, publisher of fine press book editions, proprietor of Mixolydian Editions
- Todd Gloria, 2000 (BA), former California State Assembly Member and current mayor of San Diego
