= Service time manipulation =

Major League Baseball executive tactics

In Major League Baseball (MLB), service time manipulation refers to tactics that baseball team executives employ to prevent players from becoming eligible for free agency and salary arbitration. It typically takes the form of demoting a player from the major league to the minor leagues for 16 days or more for reasons unrelated to their performance.

== Service time ==
For purposes of salary arbitration and free agency, a player acquires a year of service time if the player remains on the major league roster for at least 172 days of a typical 187-day season. Players may either be active, meaning that they are eligible to play in games, or on the injured list. According to the 2022–2026 collective bargaining agreement (CBA), an MLB player earns service time in one-day increments, up to 172 days, equaling one year, per season. Six years of service time is a key metric for eligibility for free agency. Commentators have noted that the rules of service time create a perverse incentive for teams to avoid putting their best players on the major league roster for the entire season to save money and to retain control over their players for an extra season.

After several high profile examples of service time manipulation had been alleged in the 2010s and 2020s, MLB's new CBA to end the 2021–22 lockout included provisions to increase service time eligibility. The top two finishers in Rookie of the Year voting in each league are automatically awarded a full year of service, regardless of how much they actually accrued that year. Teams will receive extra draft picks as compensation for promoting young players to their Opening Day roster who later finish in the top 3 in the Rookie of the Year voting or in the top 5 in Most Valuable Player or Cy Young Award voting.

== Examples ==
George Springer, prior to his major-league debut in the 2014 season, had turned down a seven-year, $23 million contract offer from the Houston Astros. The Astros then demoted Springer to the minors for the season's first 14 games. A writer for CBS Sports described the move as service time manipulation and as a reprisal for rejecting the contract offer.

Kris Bryant, prior to the 2015 Chicago Cubs season, was assigned to the Cubs' AAA affiliate to work on his defense, despite putting up impressive offensive numbers in the minor leagues. The Cubs started Mike Olt, who had a .159 career batting average, at Bryant's typical position on Opening Day. Seven games into the major league season, the Cubs promoted Bryant, who remained on the roster for the remaining 171 days of the season. This made Bryant ineligible to earn a year of service time. Bryant filed a grievance against the Cubs, but an arbitrator ruled that the Major League Baseball Players Association (MLBPA) did not prove that the Cubs manipulated Bryant's service time. Many players were inspired by Bryant's unsuccessful grievance to advocate for reform.

In a recorded address to a Rotary Club chapter in Bellevue, Washington on February 5, 2021, Seattle Mariners president Kevin Mather openly cited service time reasons for not calling up top prospects to the majors in the previous season, such as Jarred Kelenic. After journalists criticized Mather's statements, Mather apologized. The MLBPA called Mather's comments "offensive". Mather resigned as Mariners president the day after his remarks were criticized in the press.
