= Josh Hendrickson =

Australian baseball player (born 1997)

Houston Astros – No. 61
- Pitcher
- Born: 18 September 1997 (age 29); Perth, Australia
- Bats: Left Throws: Left

MLB debut
- 23 September, 2026, for the Houston Astros

MLB statistics (through 2026 season)
- Win–loss record: 0–0
- Earned run average: 3.38
- Strikeouts: 3
- Stats at Baseball Reference

Teams
- Houston Astros (2026–present)

Joshua Patrick Hendrickson (born 18 September 1997) is an Australian professional baseball pitcher for the Houston Astros of Major League Baseball (MLB).

== Amateur career ==
Hendrickson began playing baseball in high school and was recruited to play college baseball at Ranger College. After playing at Ranger during the 2017 season, he played collegiate summer baseball for the Portland Pickles before transferring to Barton Community College for the 2018 season. In 2018, he played collegiate summer baseball with the Orleans Firebirds of the Cape Cod Baseball League. Hendrickson transferred to the University of San Diego to play for the San Diego Toreros in 2019.

== Professional career ==
The Philadelphia Phillies selected him in the 38th round of the 2019 MLB draft. He injured his elbow in 2022 during spring training. The Phillies released him in November 2023. He then pitched in independent league baseball.

After pitching for the Adelaide Giants of the Australian Baseball League during the 2025–26 season, Hendrickson pitched for the Australia national baseball team in the 2026 World Baseball Classic. Hendrickson signed a minor league contract with the Houston Astros in April 2026. The Astros promoted Hendrickson to the major leagues on 23 September 2026. He made his MLB debut that night. Hendrickson made two regular season appearances for Houston, allowing one run over 2 2/3 innings. He next debuted in the 2026 playoffs, making one appearances in the American League Wild Card Series prior to a sweep of the Astros by the Chicago White Sox.

== Personal life ==
Hendrickson and his wife have a daughter.

== See also ==
- List of Major League Baseball players from Australia
- List of University of San Diego people
