= Kevin Mather =

American baseball executive

Kevin Mather is an American former professional baseball executive and accountant. He is a minority owner of the Seattle Mariners and served as its president from 2014 until 2021.

== Early life and career ==
Mather grew up in Madison, Wisconsin. He graduated from the University of Wisconsin–Madison in 1984, earning a Bachelor of Arts in accounting and risk/insurance. He worked as a Certified Public Accountant at a firm for five years, before joining the front office of the Minnesota Twins, starting as their director of finance in 1989, and receiving a promotion to vice president in 1992.

== Seattle Mariners ==
Mather joined the Seattle Mariners organization in 1996, serving as executive vice president of finance and administration. He was in charge of overseeing the building of Safeco Field. In January 2014, he was selected to succeed Chuck Armstrong as team president.

In July 2018, a Seattle Times article reported that Mather contributed to creating a hostile workplace environment for women. Mather had been the subject of two workplace complaints from female employees in 2009 and 2010. In both instances, the employees were compensated an undisclosed sum. The two women eventually left the organization; Mather was retained and promoted.

Mather spoke at a Bellevue Breakfast Rotary Club event in February 2021 in which he confessed to manipulating the service time of Mariners prospects such as Jarred Kelenic during the 2020 season. He made comments about the poor English-language skills of some of the team's foreign players, specifically complaining about needing to hire interpreters for players, such as Japanese pitcher Hisashi Iwakuma and remarking on the poor English of Julio Rodríguez, a Dominican prospect. Mather also commented on the team's profits during the COVID-19 pandemic. The video was released publicly on February 21, and the remarks were criticized, after which Mather apologized. The MLBPA called Mather's comments "offensive" and Mather resigned as president of the Mariners the next day. He was succeeded as team president by Catie Griggs.

== Personal life ==
Mather and his wife, Shannon, live in Issaquah, Washington. They have three sons: John, David, and Steven.
