= Free agency (Major League Baseball) =

Contractual topic in professional baseball

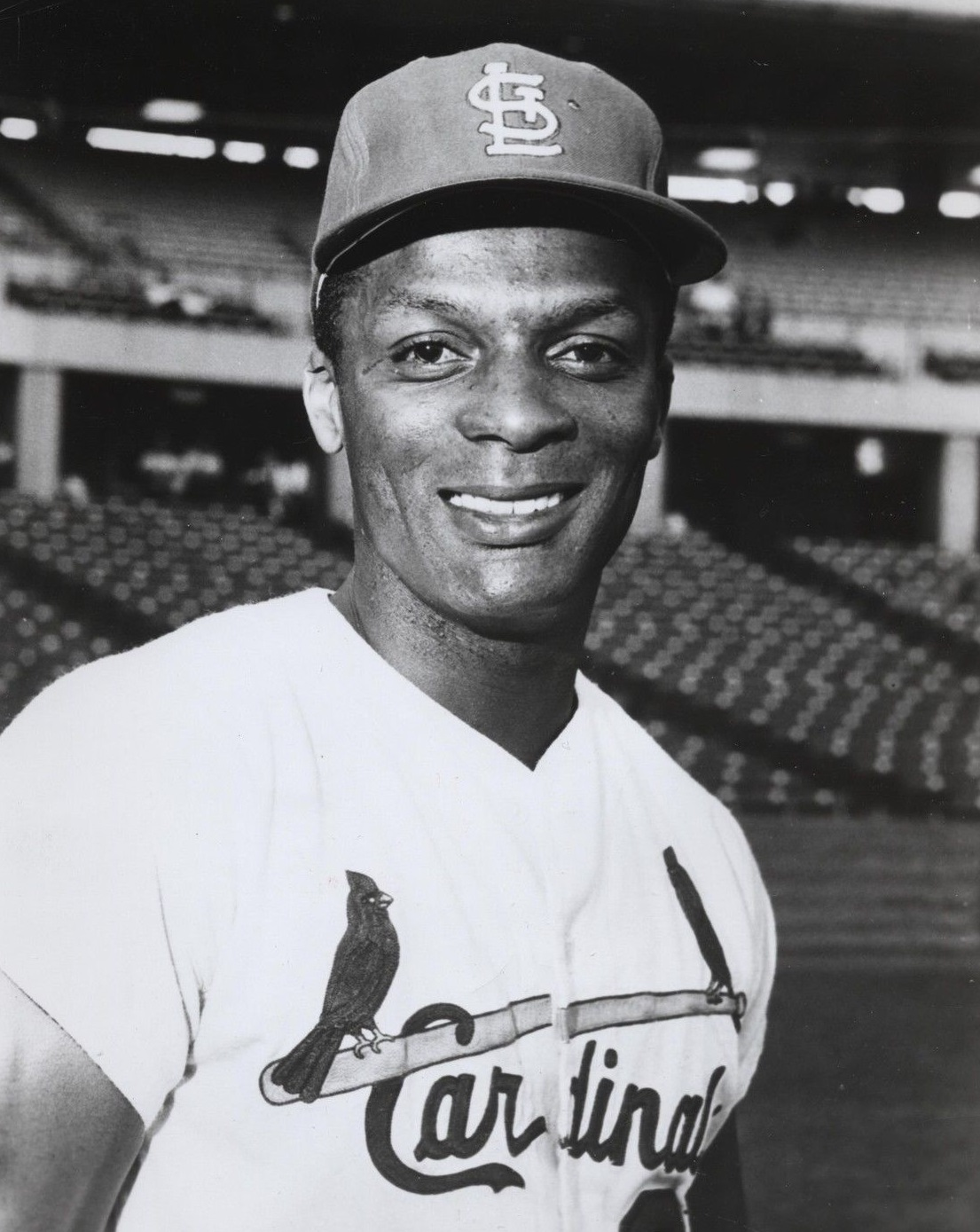
Curt Flood, plaintiff in the 1972 Supreme Court case Flood v. Kuhn, an unsuccessful effort to end baseball's reserve clause

Free agency in Major League Baseball (MLB) concerns professional athletes whose contracts with a team have expired and who are therefore eligible to sign with another team. Specifics are governed by a collective bargaining agreement (CBA) between MLB and its players' labor union, the Major League Baseball Players Association (MLBPA). Before the mid-1970s, professional baseball players could effectively be bound, in perpetuity, to the team holding their contract via a "reserve clause", thus preventing them from becoming free agents.

== History ==
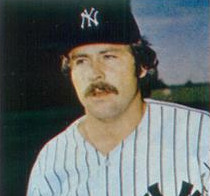
Catfish Hunter was declared a free agent in December 1974 following a breach of contract dispute.

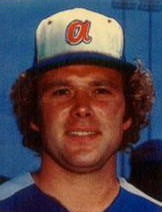
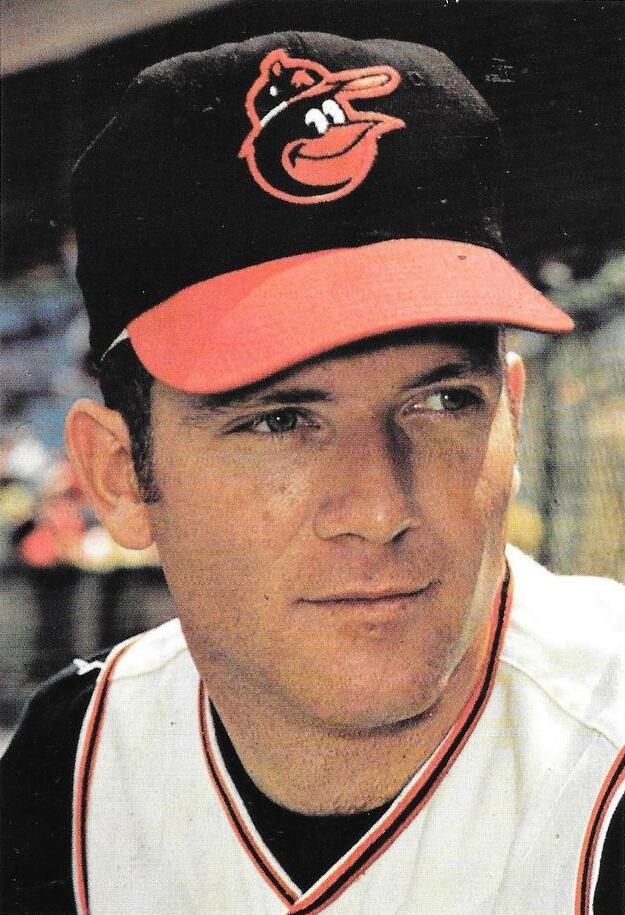
Andy Messersmith (left) and Dave McNally were declared free agents in December 1975, effectively ending baseball's reserve clause.

=== Reserve clause era ===
Free agency was very limited for most of the first century of organized baseball. Through the use of a reserve clause in player contracts, first instituted by the National League in 1879, the contractual rights to a player could be retained by a team even after the expiration of the player's contract. As long as the team renewed his contract annually (which the team could do unilaterally), the player had no ability to enter into a contract with a different team. The team with a player's contract rights could reassign, trade, or sell the player at will. A player would only become a free agent if he was released by his team, or if his team did not renew his contract. By preventing players from voluntarily moving between teams, the reserve clause kept salaries low; team owners claimed it prevented wealthy teams from hoarding the best players and ruining the competitive balance of baseball.

The reserve clause, along with baseball's exemption from the Sherman Antitrust Act (an exemption dating to the 1922 Supreme Court case Federal Baseball Club v. National League), was upheld in the 1953 Supreme Court case Toolson v. New York Yankees, Inc.

A notable challenge to the reserve clause was the 1972 Supreme Court case Flood v. Kuhn, with the plaintiff being outfielder Curt Flood and the defendant being Bowie Kuhn, the Commissioner of Baseball; the Supreme Court ruled against Flood.

In December 1974, pitcher Catfish Hunter won an arbitration hearing against the Oakland A's, initiated by a breach of contract dispute, making Hunter a free agent. Hunter subsequently signed a multi-million dollar contract with the New York Yankees. For his role in demonstrating what a highly sought-after player could be worth on the open market, Hunter has been "credited with ushering in the free-agent era."

In December 1975, an arbitration case between Major League Baseball (MLB) and the Major League Baseball Players Association (MLBPA) that challenged the reserve clause was decided in favor of two players, Andy Messersmith and Dave McNally. Known as the Seitz decision, it effectively ended the reserve clause in baseball: a player became a free agent after playing one season without signing a contract (the contract having been unilaterally renewed by the team); teams had previously been able to renew unsigned contracts annually, for as long as they wished to do so.

The specific language of the reserve clause, as quoted in the Supreme Court decision for Flood v. Kuhn, was:

10. (a) On or before January 15 (or if a Sunday, then the next preceding business day) of the year next following the last playing season covered by this contract, the Club may tender to the Player a contract for the term of that year by mailing the same to the Player at his address following his signature hereto, or if none be given, then at his last address of record with the Club. If prior to the March 1 next succeeding said January 15, the Player and the Club have not agreed upon the terms of such contract, then on or before 10 days after said March 1, the Club shall have the right by written notice to the Player at said address to renew this contract for the period of one year on the same terms, except that the amount payable to the Player shall be such as the club shall fix in said notice; provided, however, that said amount, if fixed by Major League Club, shall be an amount payable at a rate not less than 80% of the rate stipulated for the preceding year.

In 1992, MLB owners made an unsuccessful attempt to end the practice of salary arbitration for free agents.

=== Free agency era ===
Since the end of the reserve clause via the Seitz decision, changes to major-league free agency have been made through collective bargaining agreements (CBAs), as negotiated between MLB and the MLBPA.

==== 1976 agreement ====
The agreement signed on July 12, 1976, allowed players to become free agents after playing in the major leagues for six years—such players could then negotiate with up to 12 clubs (in reverse order of the prior season's final standings)—and players could demand a trade after playing in the major leagues for five years—if not traded, the player became a free agent. The agreement was ratified by a vote of players in early August.

==== 1981 agreement ====
As part of the settlement of the 1981 MLB strike, the league and players agreed to a classification system for free agents. Free agents were classified as either Type A, Type B, or unclassified:

- Type A free agents were those determined to be in the top 20% of all players, based on player statistics of the previous two seasons.
- Type B free agents were those in the next 20%.
- Unclassified free agents were those in the remaining 60% of players.

Teams that lost a Type A free agent to whom they had offered arbitration received the top selection in the annual amateur draft from the team that signed the free agent, plus a supplemental selection in the upcoming draft as compensation. Teams losing Type B free agents to whom they had offered arbitration received only a supplemental pick as compensation. Teams that lost unclassified free agents, or who did not offer arbitration to classified free agents, did not receive any compensation.

==== 2011 agreement ====
The collective bargaining agreement signed on November 22, 2011, which took effect with the 2012 season, dramatically changed free agent compensation. Players were no longer classified by type; if a player has six or more years of major-league service (on the team's 40-man roster) and is not under contract for the following season, he is automatically a free agent. The team can offer him an arbitration salary if they want to be able to receive draft pick compensation, and such an offer must be at least the average of the 125 richest contracts. However, if a player is traded during the final season of his contract, his new team will be ineligible to receive any draft pick compensation.

== Eligibility ==
If a player is drafted and is offered a contract by his drafting team (or any team to which he is traded) each year, he may not become a free agent until:

1. His contract has expired with at least six years of service time on a major league 26-man roster or injured list (formerly the 25-man roster and disabled list, respectively), OR
2. His contract has expired with less than six years of service time, but the player first signed with a Major League Baseball team as a 10-year free agent from the Japanese major leagues (NPB), OR
3. His contract has expired with less than six years of service time, but is not tendered a contract or salary arbitration offer (if eligible) by the tender deadline (usually at the end of November). Such players become non-tender free agents.

Two examples of players falling under (2) above are Hideki Okajima and Hiroki Kuroda.

A player with fewer than six years of service time is eligible for salary arbitration if he:

1. is without a contract for the next season, AND
2. has been tendered a contract offer by his current team by the tender deadline, AND
3. cannot agree with his current team on a new contract, AND
4. meets one of the conditions below:
  1. has been on a major league roster or injured list for at least three years, OR
  2. has at least two years of major league service but less than three, AND is among the top 22 percent for cumulative playing time in the majors in this class of players (and ties), AND was on an active major-league roster for at least 86 days in the previous season.

Players with more than six years of service time and who are eligible for free agency can also be offered arbitration when their contracts are up, if they have been tendered a contract offer by their current team by the tender deadline, and have not agreed on a contract.

The 4.2 example of arbitration eligibility above is called the "Super Two" exception, in which a player will have an extra year of arbitration eligibility. Notable "Super Two" players include Nolan Arenado, Chris Archer, Anthony Rendon, and Avisail Garcia. Following the salary arbitration process, the player and the team both submit a salary offer for a new contract. The arbitrator chooses one number or the other, based on which offer is closest to the salaries of players with similar ability and service time.

For purposes of salary arbitration and free agency, a player acquires a year of service time if the player remains on the major league roster for at least 172 days of the typical 187-day season.

Players eligible for neither free agency nor salary arbitration are very seldom offered contracts for much more than the league minimum salary, as the player has no recourse to try to obtain a better salary elsewhere. For this reason, in the first three major league years of their careers (except for the "Super Two" exception above), it is standard practice for players to accept comparatively low salaries even when their performance is stellar. Occasionally, a team may wish to sign a player in his second or third year to a long-term contract, and the resulting negotiations can involve salaries significantly higher than minimum. One example is the contract Ryan Braun signed barely a year into his major league career, which would have taken him through 2015. However, in April 2011, he and the Milwaukee Brewers extended that contract through 2020.

A team does not have to offer a contract to a player not eligible for free agency if his contract has expired, regardless of service time. If the player is not tendered a contract offer by the tender deadline (usually in the second week of December), the player becomes a non-tender free agent. Two examples of this include Carlton Fisk and Fred Lynn, both of whom were not tendered contracts by the Boston Red Sox in December 1980 and both became free agents. Fisk was signed by the Chicago White Sox and Lynn was traded to the California Angels.

If a player becomes a free agent without accruing six years of service time and is not a 10-year NPB free agent, they will still be subject to service time rules with their new club. For this reason, these free agents are typically only signed to a one-year contract as nothing further is required to maintain team control if the player will have less than six years’ service time at the end of that year. For example, Derek Dietrich became a free agent after being designated for assignment by the Miami Marlins and elected to become a free agent instead. He was signed by the Cincinnati Reds for the 2019 season on a minor league deal. The Reds selected his contract for the 2019 season and he had accrued five years of service time at the beginning of the 2020 season. He was under the Reds’ team control and was eligible for arbitration as if he had remained with a single team. Dietrich became a free agent in 2021.

== See also ==
- Koufax–Drysdale holdout, the first notable challenge by major-league players against owners (1966)
- Service time manipulation, tactics used by baseball team executives to prevent players from becoming eligible for free agency
