= Mia Ives-Rublee =

Disability rights activist

- Born: Mee Hye Hong; Busan, South Korea
- Education: University of Illinois (BA); University of North Carolina at Chapel Hill (MSW)
- Known for: Disability rights advocacy

Mia Ives-Rublee is an American disability rights activist, policy analyst, social worker, and public speaker who currently works as the Senior Director of the Disability Justice Initiative at the Center for American Progress. She is best known for her work on the Women's March in 2016, co-founding the Women's March Disability Caucus and developing the accessibility plans for the original march in 2017. She was nominated by President Joe Biden on December 20, 2021 to the President's Advisory Commission on Asian Americans, Native Hawaiians, and Pacific Islanders.

== Early life and education ==
Ives-Rublee was born in South Korea with the Korean name. She was born with osteogenesis imperfecta. She immigrated to the United States through inter-country adoption at the age of three. She attended Walter Hines Page High School in North Carolina and studied sociology at the University of Illinois Urbana-Champaign. At Illinois, she competed in Wheelchair Track and Road Racing and was the president of Delta Sigma Omicron, a disability service fraternity. After graduating with a bachelor's degree in sociology, she attended the University of North Carolina at Chapel Hill and obtained her master's degree in social work. She then worked as a research associate, and wrote a guest column about service dogs in The News and Observer.

== Disability activism ==
=== Women's March ===
Ives-Rublee became involved with the Women's March on Washington following the 2016 U.S. presidential election. She saw posts online about the march and decided to get a group of disabled friends together to push for the event to include disabled people. Estimates showed over 40,000 disabled people attended. The event was one of the first progressive political events to have Deaf certified interpreters.

=== Center for American Progress ===
Ives-Rublee currently works at the Center for American Progress as the Senior Director of the Disability Justice Initiative. On September 21, 2021, she provided testimony to U.S. Senate Committee on Finance Subcommittee on Social Security, Pensions, and Family Policy during a hearing on "Policy Options for Improving Supplemental Security Income". Shortly after her testimony, she also contributed a guest column to The New York Times about disability beneficiaries.

In May 2022, Ives-Rublee wrote an opinion piece in response to Ed Yong's "The Millions of People Stuck in Pandemic Limbo" for The Atlantic, where she advocated for continued masking and other public health measures to support immunocompromised people.

She worked with Representative Ayanna Pressley, Senator Tammy Duckworth, and Senator Patty Murray on a resolution to establish a "Disability Reproductive Equity Day".

== Awards and recognition ==
Ives-Rublee was named one of the Glamour's 2017 Women of the Year, along with other Women's March organizers. In May 2019, the UNC Chapel Hill's School of Social Work gave her an Outstanding Alumni award. She was also named She the People's 20 Women of Color to Watch in 2020.
