= Walter Hines Page Senior High School =

American public school in North Carolina

Location
- 201 Alma Pinnix Drive; Greensboro, North Carolina 27405; United States; 36°06′33″N 79°47′12″W

Information
- Type: Public high school secondary school
- Established: 1958 (68 years ago)
- School district: Guilford County Schools
- CEEB code: 341632
- Principal: Erik Naglee
- Staff: 97.00 (FTE)
- Grades: 9–12
- Gender: Co-Educational
- Enrollment: 1,672(2023–24)
- Student to teacher ratio: 18.46
- Schedule: Traditional
- Campus type: Suburban
- Colors: Red and white
- Athletics: NCHSAA 7A
- Athletics conference: Metro 6A/7A
- Mascot: Pirate
- Nickname: Pirates
- Rival: Grimsley High School
- Newspaper: Pages By Page
- Yearbook: Buccaneer
- Website: pagehs.gcsnc.com

Walter Hines Page Senior High School (commonly referred to as Page High School or simply Page) is a four-year public high school located in Greensboro, North Carolina, United States.

== History ==
=== Establishment and Early Growth (1958–1966) ===
Walter Hines Page Senior High School officially opened in September 1958 in Greensboro, North Carolina, under the leadership of founding principal Luther R. Medlin, who had previously served as principal of Central Junior High School. The school began with approximately 500 students and 30 staff members. It was named in honor of Walter Hines Page, a prominent North Carolinian who served as a journalist, diplomat, and strong advocate for public education. Page High School became the first high school in North Carolina to be fully accredited in its inaugural year of operation.

=== Campus Expansion and Beautification (1962–1981) ===
To accommodate rising enrollment in the early 1960s, the school underwent significant expansion. In 1962–1963, a new auditorium and “G-Wing” were added to the original structure. Over the next two decades, additional facilities were constructed, including the A-Wing extension, a second gymnasium, lighted tennis courts, a football stadium, and expanded cafeteria space. In 1986–1987, the school incorporated the ninth grade and installed mobile classroom units to meet the increased demand. One of the most iconic contributions to the campus environment was made by Alma Pinnix, a devoted volunteer who landscaped and maintained the school grounds for years. In recognition of her efforts, the road in front of the school was renamed Alma Pinnix Drive after her death in 1981.

=== Leadership Transitions ===
Luther R. Medlin served as principal until 1967, when he left to become president of what is now Guilford Technical Community College. He was succeeded by Robert A. Newton, who led the school from 1967 to 1970. Newton was followed by Robert A. Clendenin, formerly of Aycock Junior High, who served as principal from 1970 until July 1991. In August 1991, Paul J. Puryear, a Page High School alumnus and former assistant principal, returned from Athens Drive High School in Raleigh to become the school's fourth principal.

=== Academic Recognition and Cultural Achievements (1959–1980s) ===
Between 1959 and 1965, Page High School produced two Morehead Scholars each year, reflecting a strong academic tradition. The school's National Honor Society chapter was established in its first year, 1958–1959. In the 1980s, Page became a participant in the North Carolina Scholars Program and the Presidential Academic Fitness Awards. In 1981–1982, the school's Cultural Arts Department was recognized as a national finalist for the $10,000 Rockefeller Foundation Grant. Page's band, chorus, and orchestra earned accolades across local, state, and national levels and performed extensively throughout the U.S. and abroad.

=== IB and Advanced Academic Programming (2000s–2025) ===
Page High School became an International Baccalaureate (IB) World School on February 15, 2008, and offers the IB Diploma Programme for juniors and seniors. The school also offers 20 Advanced Placement (AP) courses, over 70 honors-level classes, and dual enrollment opportunities through Guilford Technical Community College's Career and College Promise program. Students from across Guilford County may apply to Page's IB program, which consistently serves a cohort of around 100 students.

=== Modern Era and Community Engagement (2010s–2025) ===
In the 2000s, Page's enrollment peaked at nearly 2,000 students, with over 100 faculty members. As of the 2024–2025 school year, enrollment remains between 1,600 and 1,800 students, with a diverse student body and strong participation in academic and extracurricular programs.

Page High School has recently faced challenges related to aging infrastructure. In 2024, Guilford County Schools Superintendent Whitney Oakley cited the school as part of a broader district-wide effort to address decades of deferred maintenance, and parents have called for capital funding to renovate outdated HVAC systems, classroom buildings, and other facilities. Local discussions on social media and at school board meetings have pushed for faster timelines to address deteriorating conditions on campus.

== Athletics ==
Walter Hines Page High School athletic teams, known as the Pirates, compete in North Carolina's 7A classification.

Page has secured state championships in football (1980, 1983, 1984, 1985, 2011), girls’ soccer (1986–1988), boys’ swimming (1990), girls’ tennis (2004–2007), wrestling (1969, 1970), basketball, and boys' soccer, among others. In the 1982–83 school year, the Pirates earned both the Wachovia Cup and the News & Record Cup, awarded for superior overall varsity athletic performance in Greensboro/Guilford County.

Baseball champion teams and other group successes are highlighted in official athletic summaries.

In 1969 and 1970, Page's wrestling team claimed back-to-back state titles under coaches Richardson and Fred Yakin, respectively.

== Rivalries ==
A heated rivalry exists between Page and Grimsley Senior High School. The annual football showdown between the two began in the 1960s and continues to draw large crowds. Since 1958, Page has held a series lead (approximately 47–11–3 before 2019), though Grimsley snapped a long-standing losing streak in games played during the 1980s and again more recently.

Since 2006, alumni from both schools have annually competed in the Page–Grimsley Rivalry Reunion Golf Tournament, a charity event held each year on the Friday before the football game. To date, the tournament has raised over $465,000 for both schools' athletic departments.

== Music program ==
There are four band ensembles offered at Page. The basic ensemble is the non-audition based Concert Band. From Concert Band, students may continue into one or more of the three higher, audition-based groups: Symphonic Band, Wind Ensemble, or Jazz Band. The school also offers non-performance classes, which currently consist of IB Music, but has included AP Music Theory in the past. The school also has marching band, named the Page Marching Pirates. They perform at football games, and annually participate in local parades such as the Greensboro Holiday Parade.

Page High School has a String Orchestra. During a normal school year, there are two separate levels of string performance. Both levels perform four regular concerts throughout the year, playing together and on occasion with the Band or Choral groups.

== Academics ==
Page Senior High School continues to win new academic honors regionally, statewide, and nationally in such areas as Mock Trial, Science Olympiad, High IQ, and Computer High IQ. Page offers a number of Advanced Placement courses, as well as registering with the International Baccalaureate program in 2008. This option of two advanced-level class selections has given a boost to Page's academics and statistical performance, but has also led to curriculum and staff distribution issues which the school aims to rectify soon.

== Theater ==
Page Senior High School's performers are known as the Page Playmakers. Page Senior High is Troupe #7253 of the International Thespian Society. The Page Playmakers usually follow a show schedule similar to this:

- Cabaret, a variety show of short skits, songs, and dances based around a central theme.
- A winter play. For the 2017–2018 season, the Playmakers presented "Crazytown" by Jonathan Rand, under the direction of Laura White. In 2018–2019, they performed “Alice in Wonderland.”
- A spring musical. For the 2017–2018 season, the Playmakers presented Broadway's "Footloose!: The Musical" in March 2018. In 2019, they performed “The Addams Family.”

== Notable alumni ==
- Michael Brooks (born 1967), NFL safety
- Lamont Burns (born 1974), NFL offensive guard
- Spencer Chamberlain (born 1983), lead vocalist for metalcore band Underoath
- Shannon Cochran, actress
- Brandon Copeland (born 1986), Arena football wide receiver
- Todd Ellis (born 1967), football quarterback, radio broadcaster
- Bryson Fonville (born 1994), professional basketball player
- Jasmine Gill (born 1990), professional women's basketball player
- Jeremy Harris (born 1996), professional basketball player
- John Isner (born 1985), professional tennis player
- Mia Ives-Rublee (born 1984), political activist and President Biden Appointee
- Haywood Jeffires (born 1964), All-Pro NFL wide receiver
- Ken Jeong (born 1969), physician, comedian, and actor (Knocked Up, The Hangover and its sequels, television sitcoms Community and Dr. Ken)
- Paris Kea (born 1996), WNBA player
- Jake Knapp (born 2000), Minor league baseball player
- Stan Lane (born 1953), retired professional wrestler
- Javon Leake (born 1998), NFL running back
- Rob Lovejoy (born 1991), MLS player
- Danny Manning (born 1966), college basketball coach and NBA player
- Eddie Robinson (born 1978), MLS player
- Lee Rouson (born 1962), NFL running back and 2x Super Bowl champion with the New York Giants
- Mo Spencer (born 1952), NFL defensive back
- Whitney Way Thore (born 1984), American television personality
- Barbara Weathers (born 1963), American Singer & Entertainer
- Tripp Welborne (born 1968), NFL safety and punt returner
