= Holly Ham =

Vietnamese-American business executive (born 1972)

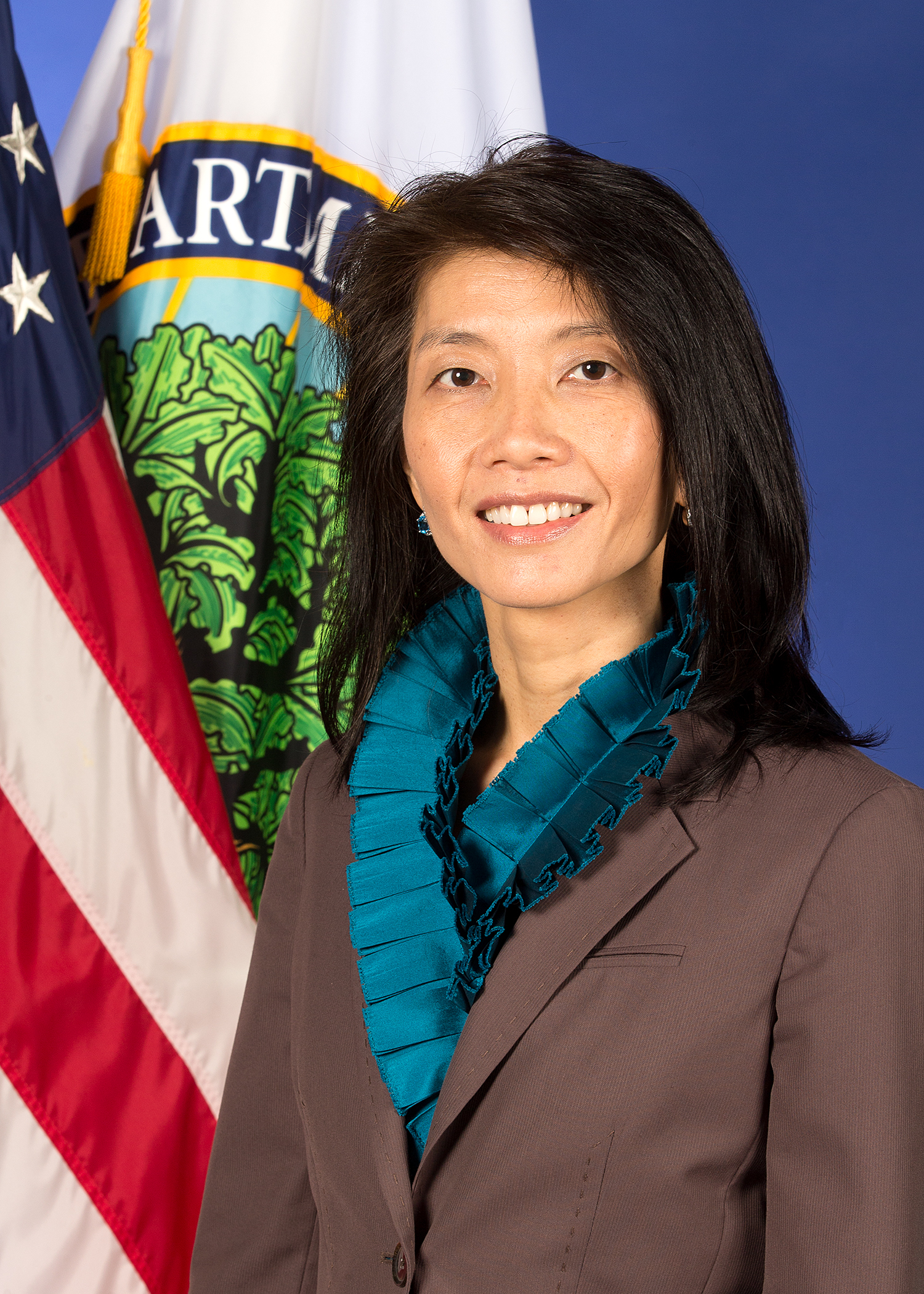
- Born: Holly Luong Ham; 1972 (age 53–54); Saigon, South Vietnam
- Education: University of Houston (BBA, MBA)
- Occupation: business executive
- Years active: 1994–present

Executive Director of the White House Initiative on Asian Americans and Pacific Islanders
- In office November 13, 2017 – October 26, 2019
- President: Donald Trump
- Preceded by: Duoa Thor
- Succeeded by: Tina Wei Smith

Acting Director of the Center for Faith and Opportunity Initiatives, U.S. Department of Education
- In office April 2019 – October 26, 2019
- President: Donald Trump
- Succeeded by: Andrea Ramirez

Assistant Secretary for Management at U.S. Department of Education
- In office April 20, 2017 – November 12, 2017
- President: Donald Trump
- Preceded by: Denise L. Carter (acting)
- Succeeded by: Denise L. Carter (acting)

Holly Luong Ham is an American business executive and former Washington, D.C., government official. She served as a senior official in the U.S. Department of Housing and Urban Development and in the U.S. Department of Commerce Minority Business Development Agency (MBDA). Ham also served as the executive director of the White House Initiative on Asian Americans and Pacific Islanders in the U.S. Department of Education. Prior to that, Ham served as the Assistant Secretary for Management in the U.S. Department of Education, where she was appointed by President Trump on April 20, 2017.

== Early life and education ==
Ham was born in Saigon, South Vietnam, to Chinese parents. After the end of the Vietnam War, her parents took their five children and fled in the summer of 1979. In January 1980, at the age of 7, Ham and her family settled in Texas as refugees. Ham graduated from the University of Houston, where she received both her Bachelor and Master of Business Administration degrees and was a member of business honor society Beta Gamma Sigma.

== Career ==
=== Early and mid-career ===
In May 2023, Ham lost a 3-way race for Position 6 for Humble ISD Board of Trustees. Ham's campaign platform centered around issues of teacher retention, curriculum rigor and addressing the needs of students post-graduation.

=== Government career ===
On April 20, 2017, President Trump announced Ham's appointment as Assistant Secretary for Management in the U.S. Department of Education. The post did not require Senate confirmation.

On November 13, 2017, Ham was appointed executive director of the White House Initiative on Asian Americans and Pacific Islanders (AAPIs) in the U.S. Department of Education.

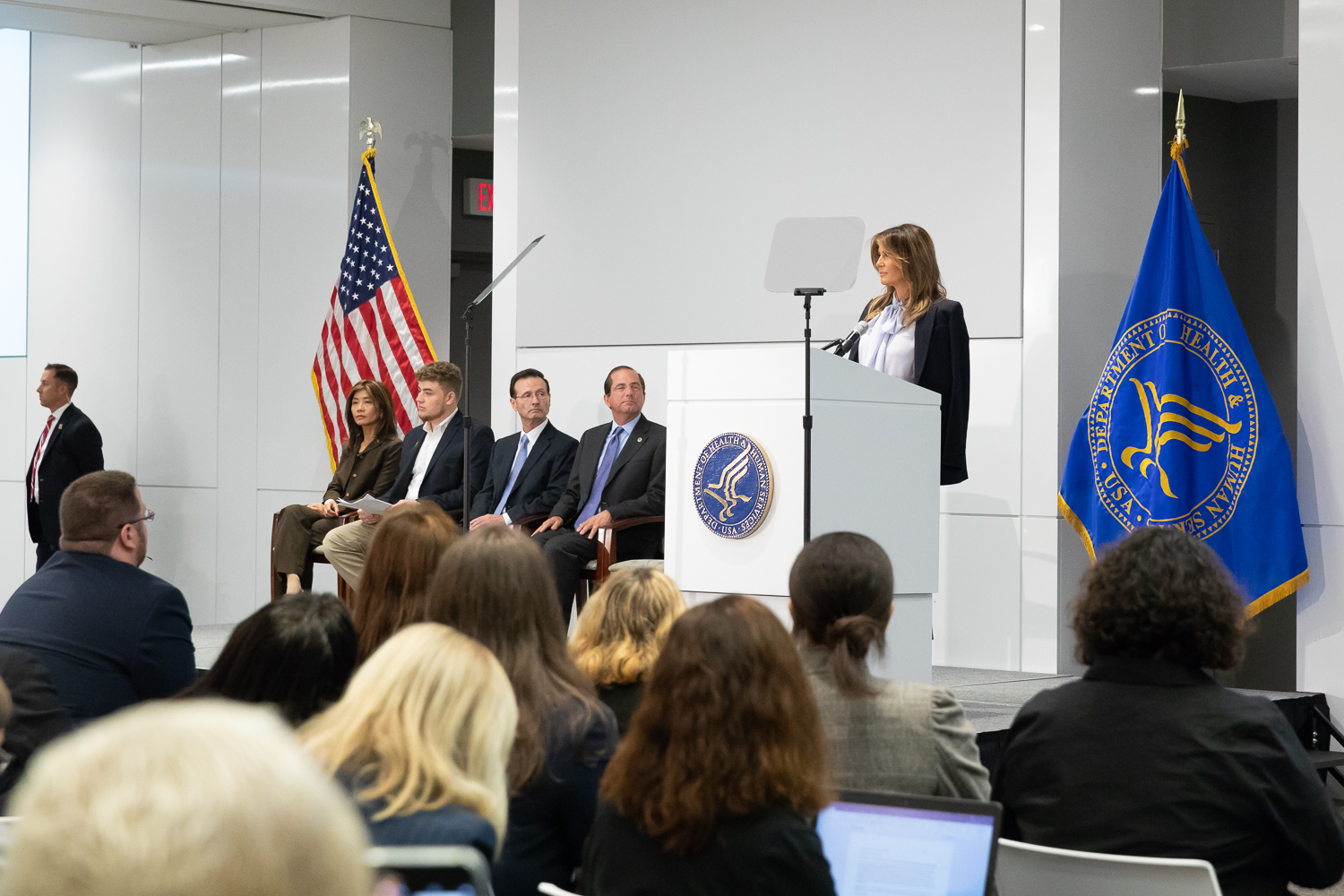
Ham pictured alongside First Lady Melania Trump at the Federal Partners in Bullying Prevention Summit on Cyberbullying, August 2018.

On August 20, 2018, Ham spoke alongside First Lady Melania Trump and federal colleagues at the Federal Partners in Bullying Prevention Summit on Cyberbullying, hosted at the U.S. Department of Health and Human Services.
