= Mo Spencer =

American football player (born 1952)

No. 46, 29
- Position: Defensive back

Personal information
- Born: June 15, 1952 (age 74); Winston-Salem, North Carolina, U.S.
- Listed height: 6 ft 0 in (1.83 m)
- Listed weight: 175 lb (79 kg)

Career information
- High school: Walter H. Page (NC)
- College: North Carolina Central
- NFL draft: 1974: 3rd round, 71st overall pick

Career history
- St. Louis Cardinals (1974); New Orleans Saints (1974-1978)

Career NFL statistics
- Interceptions: 5
- Fumble recoveries: 6
- Stats at Pro Football Reference

Thurmon Maurice "Mo" Spencer (born June 15, 1952) is an American former professional football player who played defensive back for four seasons for the St. Louis Cardinals and New Orleans Saints
