= Brandon Copeland (wide receiver) =

American football player (born 1986)

No. 80
- Position: Wide receiver

Personal information
- Born: March 31, 1986 (age 40); Norfolk, Virginia
- Listed height: 6 ft 1 in (1.85 m)
- Listed weight: 195 lb (88 kg)

Career information
- High school: Walter H. Page (NC)
- College: Bridgewater College
- NFL draft: 2008: undrafted

Career history
- Cleveland Browns (2008)*; Philadelphia Soul (2008)*; Peoria Pirates (2009); Tri-Cities Fever (2009–2010); Tulsa Talons (2011)
- * Offseason or practice squad member only

Career AFL statistics
- Receptions: 103
- Receiving yards: 1,008
- Receiving TDs: 16
- Tackles: 12
- Kickoff return TDs: 1
- Stats at ArenaFan.com

Brandon Copeland (born March 31, 1986) is a former American and Arena football wide receiver. He began his football career in college at Bridgewater College for four seasons with the Eagles.

In all four of his seasons with the Eagles, Copeland saw significant playing time. In both 2006 and 2007, Copeland played as a starter for the Eagles. After going undrafted in the 2008 NFL draft, the Cleveland Browns called Copeland in to attend the rookie Mini-camp. Following his camp in Cleveland, he would spend time in the 2008 season Arena Football League with the Philadelphia Soul and the Tri-Cities Fever AF2. In 2009, after failing to appear in an Arena Football League game, Copeland signed with the AF2's (Arena Football League 2) Tri-Cities Fever. He spent the remainder of the 2009 season with the Fever and totaled 41 passes for over 400 yards and 7 touchdowns in the last 5 games of the season. With great success with the Fever in 2009, Copeland was called back to participate with the team for the 2010 season. Copeland finished the 2010 IFL season as one of the elite 8 wide receivers in the league for reception and yards. Copeland is currently signed under contract with the Tulsa Talons of the Arena Football 1 league.

== Early life ==
He attended Walter Hines Page Senior High School in Greensboro, North Carolina. Throughout high school, Copeland played football, freshman basketball, and in track and field as a Sprint (running), long jumper and a triple jumper.

== College career ==
=== Bridgewater College ===
Copeland attended Bridgewater College for four years and received his Bachelor of Science degree in Biology.

=== Football ===
Copeland's football stats for his career at Bridgewater College were 127 receptions for 1,924 yards and 21 TD's. While in college, Copeland managed to stack up many awards, records, and honors. In his 2004 and 2005 seasons, Copeland was a part of the ODAC conference football championship. In Copeland's career, he is:

==== Bridgewater College Football Career Top 10 Lists ====
- No. 2 in receiving yards with 1,924
- No. 2 in receiving touchdowns with 21
- No. 2 in receptions with 127
- No. 6 in punt returns with 30
- No. 7 in punt return yards with 293
- No. 7 in yards per punt return at 9.77
- No. 9 in yards per catch at 15.15

Copeland holds the record for longest pass reception from scrimmage with a 99-yard reception against Wesley College (Delaware) (12/3/05). Copeland also splits a record for most receiving yards in a game against Randolph–Macon College (11/4/06) with 217 reception yards.

=== Track & Field ===
Copeland's Track and field stats at Bridgewater College were:

- 2008 NCAA Qualifier Outdoor Championship Long Jump
- 2008 NCAA Qualifier Outdoor Championship 4 × 100 meter relay
- 2008 Old Dominion Athletic Conference champion (outdoor long jump)
- 2008 Old Dominion Athletic Conference champion (outdoor 4 × 100 meter relay)
- 2008 Old Dominion Athletic Conference champion (indoor long jump)
- 2007 Old Dominion Athletic Conference champion (indoor long jump)
- 11th-best long jump at the 2007 NCAA Indoor Track & Field Championships
- 2006 All-American (long jump)
- 7th-best long jump at the 2006 NCAA Outdoor Track & Field Championships
- 2006 Old Dominion Athletic Conference champion (outdoor long jump)

== Professional career ==
=== National Football League ===
Copeland was an undrafted free agent with the Cleveland Browns and was a part of their rookie Mini-camp. While attending the camp, Copeland was named "honorable mention camper" on day 2 of camp. Writer quoted "caught everything thrown his way".

Copeland attended the 2012 NFL Scouting Combine held in Baltimore, MD on 2/11/12. There he posted the following stats:

Pre-draft measurables
Height	Weight	Arm length	Hand span	40-yard dash	20-yard split	20-yard shuttle	Vertical jump
6 ft 0 in (1.83 m)	199 lb (90 kg)	30.5 in (0.77 m)	9 in (0.23 m)	4.60 s	2.60 s	4.24 s	39 in (0.99 m)
February 11, 2012 at Baltimore Ravens Practice Facility

External videos
- Brandon Copeland Wide Receiver NFL Regional Combines

After performing drills and running routes for the scouts, Copeland was selected to attend the NFL's Super Regional Combine held at Ford Field in Detroit, MI. On 3/30-3/31/12, Copeland attended the Super NFL Scouting Combine in front of 60+ representatives from all 32 teams. There Copeland posted the following stats:

Pre-draft measurables
Height	Weight	Arm length	Hand span	40-yard dash	20-yard split
6 ft 0 in (1.83 m)	205 lb (93 kg)	30.5 in (0.77 m)	9 in (0.23 m)	4.56 s	2.57 s
March 30, 2012 at Ford Field

External videos
- Brandon Copeland Wide Receiver NFL Regional Combines

=== Arena Football League ===
Copeland was invited to camp with the Tulsa Talons in 2011, and is currently still active with the team.

Copeland was signed to the practice squad of the Philadelphia Soul towards the end of the 2008 Arena Football League season.

=== Arena Football League 2 ===
Copeland attended the mini-camp of the Peoria Pirates in March of the 2009 season. He was released from the team at the end of camp due to insufficient roster space. In May 2009, Copeland was called back to be a part of the Peoria Pirates. From May until mid June, Copeland was just a practice player. In July, Copeland and many others were released by the team due to coaching staff changes. From his stint with the team, Copeland played in one game and recorded 3 catches for 34 yards. When Copeland was released from the Pirates in July, he was signed by the Tri-Cities Fever weeks later, for the remainder of the season. With the Fever, Copeland tallied up a total 41 passes for over 400 yards and 7 touchdowns in the last 5 games of the season.

=== Indoor Football League (IFL) ===
At the end of the 2009 AF2 season with the Fever, Copeland was resigned to the team under new management with the Indoor Football League. Copeland participated the whole
