= Mark Appel =

American baseball player (born 1991)

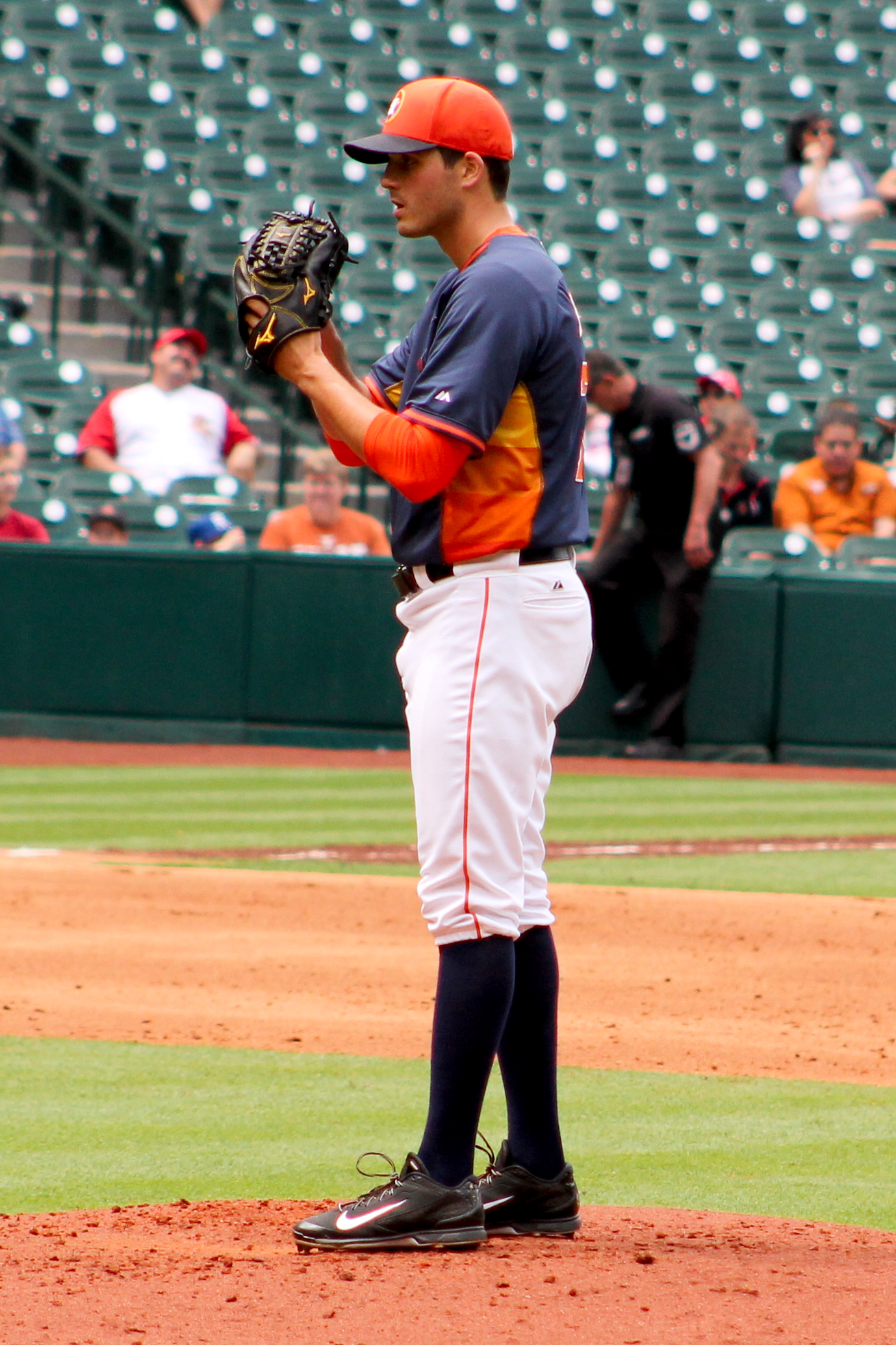
- Appel with the Houston Astros organization in 2014
- Pitcher
- Born: July 15, 1991 (age 35); Houston, Texas, U.S.
- Batted: Right Threw: Right

MLB debut
- June 29, 2022, for the Philadelphia Phillies

Last MLB appearance
- August 2, 2022, for the Philadelphia Phillies

MLB statistics
- Win–loss record: 0–0
- Earned run average: 1.74
- Strikeouts: 5
- Stats at Baseball Reference

Teams
- Philadelphia Phillies (2022)

Mark Stewart Appel (born July 15, 1991) is an American former professional baseball pitcher. He was drafted by the Houston Astros with the first overall pick of the 2013 MLB draft. He has previously played in Major League Baseball (MLB) for the Philadelphia Phillies.

After being drafted out of high school by the Detroit Tigers in 2009, Appel elected to attend Stanford University and play for the Stanford Cardinal baseball team. Named the National Collegiate Baseball Writers Association's Pitcher of the Year in 2012, he was projected as the first overall draft choice in the 2012 MLB draft, but fell in the draft due to signability concerns. Appel did not sign after being selected eighth overall by the Pittsburgh Pirates, returning to Stanford for his senior season.

Appel was selected with the first overall pick in the 2013 MLB draft by the Astros, who traded him to the Phillies after the 2015 season. After continued struggles, he was designated for assignment by the Phillies on November 20, 2017. In February 2018, at the age of 26, Appel announced that he was stepping away from baseball. He returned to the Phillies organization in March 2021 to attempt a comeback, and made his major league debut in June 2022.

== Early life ==
Appel attended Monte Vista High School in Danville, California, where he played for the baseball and basketball teams. Appel was a relief pitcher for Monte Vista's baseball team, making no appearances as a starting pitcher, because other pitchers on the team were thought to be more talented.

== College career ==
The Detroit Tigers selected Appel in the 15th round, with the 450th overall selection, of the 2009 Major League Baseball (MLB) draft. Appel did not sign, as he was committed to attend Stanford University. At Stanford, Appel received a scholarship to play college baseball for the Stanford Cardinal baseball team, competing in the Pac-10 Conference. Appel began his collegiate career as a reliever, making 24 relief appearances, but also starting three games. He had a 5.92 earned run average (ERA), as he allowed a .295 batting average against and only recorded 26 strikeouts in 38 innings pitched. He became a starting pitcher during his sophomore season. In the summer of 2010, he played for the Newport Gulls of the New England Collegiate Baseball League (NECBL), posting a 6–1 win–loss record and 1.87 ERA in 43 1/3 innings.

As a sophomore for Stanford in 2011, Appel had a 6–7 win-loss record with a 3.02 ERA in 110 1/3 innings pitched. After the 2011 season, he played collegiate summer baseball with the Yarmouth–Dennis Red Sox of the Cape Cod Baseball League. Going into his junior year in 2012, Collegiate Baseball named Appel a First Team All-American. As a junior, he pitched to a 10–2 record and 2.56 ERA, and won the National Pitcher of the Year Award. Appel was projected as a potential first overall pick in the 2012 Major League Baseball draft, but reportedly rejected an offer from the Astros for a $6 million signing bonus. Due to the high perceived bonus demands, Appel fell in the draft to the eighth overall selection, where he was chosen by the Pittsburgh Pirates. However, Appel did not sign with the Pirates before the July 13, 2012, deadline and instead played his senior year at Stanford. He turned down an offer of a $3.8 million signing bonus.

Appel graduated from Stanford after the fall semester, receiving a bachelor's degree in management science and engineering. For the Cardinal baseball team, Appel pitched to a 10–4 record with a 2.12 ERA and struck out 130 batters in 106 1/3 innings. The Pac-12 Conference honored him as their Scholar-Athlete of the Year.

== Professional career ==
=== Houston Astros ===
==== Minor leagues ====
The Houston Astros selected Appel with the first overall pick in the 2013 Major League Baseball draft. On June 19, he signed with the Astros for a signing bonus worth $6.35 million. Appel made his professional debut in July with the Tri-City ValleyCats of the Low-A New York–Penn League. After making two starts for Tri-City, the Astros promoted Appel to the Quad Cities River Bandits of the Single-A Midwest League. When Appel joined Quad Cities, teaming with Carlos Correa, this marked the first time that two consecutive first overall draft picks played for the same minor league team. The Astros ended Appel's season in August, with approximately 140 innings pitched on the season, between college and minor league baseball. For Tri-City and Quad Cities, Appel pitched to a 3–1 record in 10 games started, with a 3.79 ERA and 33 strikeouts with nine walks in 38 innings.

The Astros invited Appel to spring training in 2014 as a non-roster player. Appel underwent an appendectomy in January, which delayed his preparations for the 2014 season. He was reassigned to minor league camp, where he made his spring debut. He started for the Astros in their final spring training game, throwing three scoreless innings against the Rojos del Águila de Veracruz of the Mexican League. The Astros assigned Appel to the Lancaster JetHawks of the High-A California League at the start of the regular season. He struggled with his adaptation to the Astros' tandem starting rotation (under which an eight-man rotation pitches every fourth game), and went to extended spring training after four starts. After a month, he returned to Lancaster. After pitching to a 2–5 record and a 9.74 ERA in 12 starts for Lancaster, the Astros promoted Appel to the Corpus Christi Hooks of the Double-A Texas League. Jeff Luhnow, the Astros' general manager, noted Lancaster's "hostile pitching environment", and stated that it was the Astros' intention to have Appel pitch in Corpus Christi in 2014 regardless of his performance in Lancaster. Appel finished the regular season with a 1–2 win–loss record and a 3.69 ERA in seven games for Corpus Christi. These struggles were attributed to command struggles and a low strikeout rate. The Astros then assigned him to the Salt River Rafters of the Arizona Fall League after the season, where he had a 2.61 ERA and 24 strikeouts to eight walks in 31 innings pitched, while limiting opponents to a .167 batting average against.

Appel began the 2015 season with Corpus Christi. He was chosen to represent the Astros at the 2015 All-Star Futures Game. Appel pitched to a 5–1 record and a 4.26 ERA in 13 starts for Corpus Christi before the Astros promoted Appel to the Fresno Grizzlies of the Triple-A Pacific Coast League in June. Appel finished the 2015 season with a 4.48 ERA in 12 starts for Fresno.

=== Philadelphia Phillies ===
On December 12, 2015, the Astros traded Appel, Vince Velasquez, Brett Oberholtzer, Tom Eshelman, and Harold Arauz to the Philadelphia Phillies in exchange for Ken Giles and Jonathan Araúz. Appel began the 2016 season with the Lehigh Valley IronPigs of the Triple-A International League. In May 2016, he was placed on the disabled list due to a shoulder injury. While rehabbing his arm, he injured his elbow. On June 29, 2016, he underwent season-ending surgery to remove a bone spur from his elbow.

The Phillies added Appel to their 40-man roster after the 2016 season. Appel began the 2017 season with Lehigh Valley. He suffered a shoulder injury in July, and returned to Lehigh Valley in September. He ended the season with a 5–4 record and a 5.14 ERA in 17 games started. The Phillies designated Appel for assignment on November 20, 2017. On February 1, 2018, Appel announced that he would be stepping away from baseball at the age of 26. He was placed on the reserve/retired list.

Beginning in March 2021, Appel attempted a comeback. Assigned to the Reading Fightin Phils of the Double-A Eastern League to start the 2021 season, Appel went 0–1 with a 5.84 ERA over eight total appearances, including six starts, and was promoted to Lehigh Valley. Appel returned to Lehigh Valley to start the 2022 season.

==== Major leagues ====
On June 24, after a Phillies' loss to the San Diego Padres, Appel was called up to the Major Leagues, replacing Connor Brogdon, who was placed on the COVID-19 injured list; Appel had pitched to a 5–0 record and a 1.61 ERA in 28 innings for Lehigh Valley prior to his promotion. Appel made his major league debut on June 29, pitching one inning of relief against the Atlanta Braves. In six appearances during his rookie campaign, he logged a 1.74 ERA with 5 strikeouts in 10 1/3 innings pitched. Appel's season ended prematurely when he was placed on the injured list with right elbow inflammation on September 12. On November 9, Appel was removed from the 40-man roster and sent outright to Triple–A. He elected free agency the following day.

On January 24, 2023, Appel re-signed with the Phillies organization on a minor league contract. Appel had an 11.12 ERA across six games in spring training and was released by the Phillies on March 20. He underwent an arthroscopic procedure on his elbow in April and missed the entire season as a result.

== Personal life ==
Appel was born in Houston, Texas. His family moved to San Ramon, California, when he was 12 years old. Appel's father, Patrick, works as a lawyer for the Chevron Corporation. Patrick and Appel's mother, Sondra, lived in Beijing and Shanghai for a time. Appel has an older brother, John. Appel is a Christian.
