= Bo Thao-Urabe =

American social entrepreneur

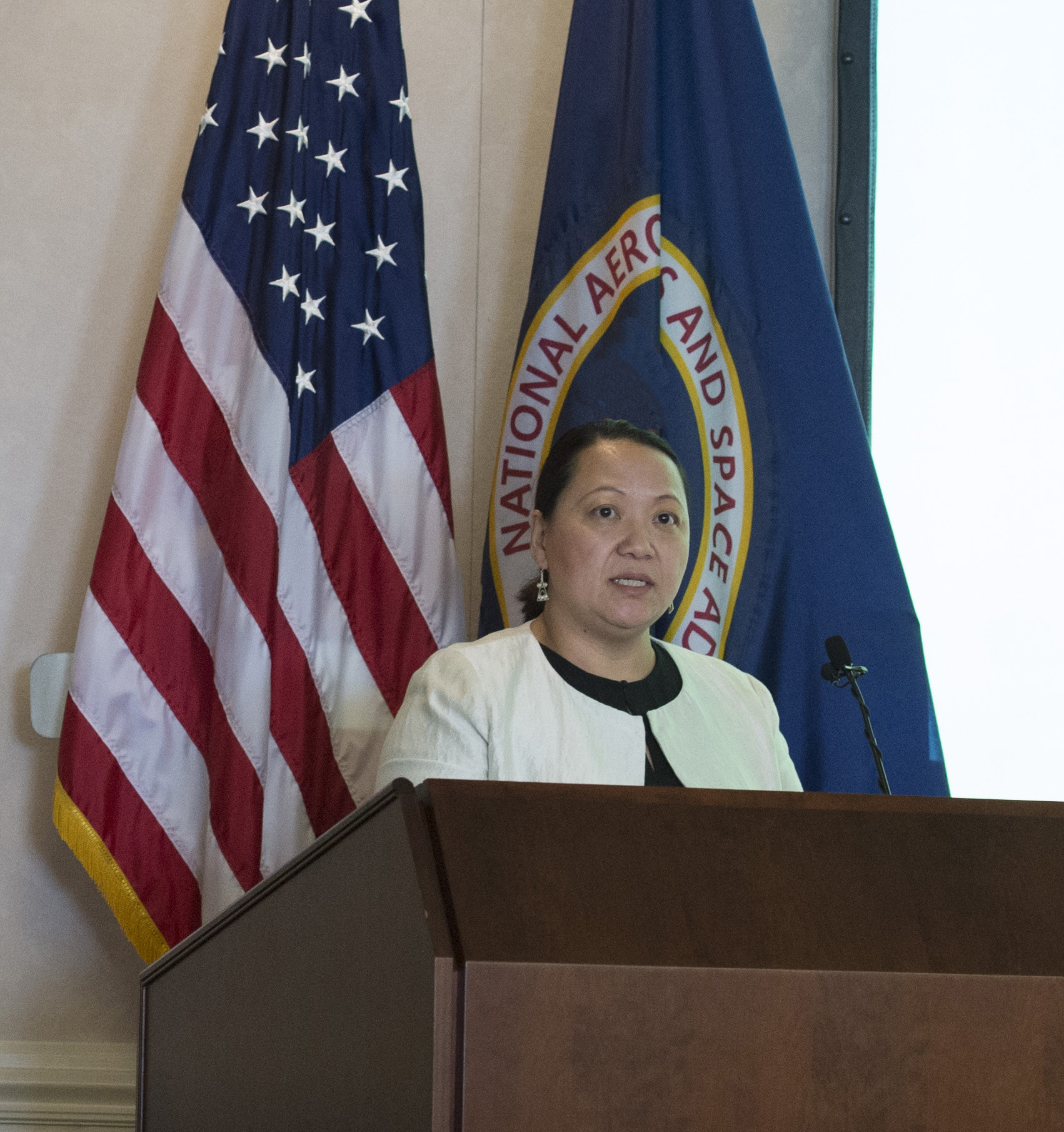
- Thao-Urabe speaking at the Marshall Space Flight Center
- Occupation: social entrepreneur
- Known for: social entrepreneurial

Bo Thao-Urabe (born 1973) is a social entrepreneur who has founded numerous organizations and efforts to advance social justice. A sought after leader, Thao-Urabe has served the community in local, state and national settings. She was appointed as a Regent to the University of Minnesota by Governor Walz in 2021. President Obama appointed Thao-Urabe as a Commissioner to the President’s White House Initiative on Asian Americans and Pacific Islanders. She has also served as Senior Director at Asian Americans/Pacific Islanders in Philanthropy (AAPIP). She has received numerous awards and recognitions, including the prestigious Bush Fellowship from the Bush Foundation in 2019.

== Early life and education ==
Thao-Urabe was born in Laos. Her family is Hmong and fled to Thailand after the Secret War in Laos, a covert operation by the CIA during the Vietnam War. They spent three years in a refugee camp and immigrated to the United States in 1979. She received a B.S. from the University of Minnesota and lives in Minnesota.

== Career and community activism ==
In 2012, she founded the Building More Philanthropy with Purpose (BMPP) Giving Circle with Kaohly Her and Terri Thao, which brings Asian American families together to pool their resources together to fund social justice causes in the Upper Midwest. As of 2024, the BMPP Giving Circle has raised $300,000 for projects. The following year, Thao-Urabe co-founded the Coalition of Asian American Leaders (CAAL). The CAAL sought to create a leadership network representative of the Asian Populations in Minnesota and together they provide policy recommendations. She acted as the Executive and Network Director until 2022, when she transitioned into a Senior Advisor role. In 2014, Thao-Urabe founded and served as the chief operating officer of RedGreen Rivers, a social enterprise which develops and connects women artisans in Southeast Asia to global markets.

Apart from her entrepreneurship pursuits, Bo Thao-Urabe has been elected and appointed to a multitude of philanthropy driven boards. In 2022, she joined Drake Bank's Board of Directors. Drake Bank is an independent bank in St. Paul, MN. In 2023 alone, she was elected to both the Minnesota Public Radio Board of Trustees and the Saint Paul & Minnesota Foundation Board of Directors.

== Awards and recognition ==
Bo Thao-Urabe has received numerous awards, including the prestigious Bush Fellowship from the Bush Foundation in 2019. Many of her honors come from the Minnesota community, such as being recognized as the Minnesota's Association of Fundraising Professional's 2020 Philanthropy Day Award Honoree. Her commitment extends beyond the realm of philanthropy, as seen when she was awarded the Facing Race award in 2018 from the Saint Paul & Minnesota Foundation for her work with CAAL. Both Saint Paul Mayor Coleman and Governor Mark Dayton declared November 1 as Bo Thao-Urabe Day.
