= Lamont Burns =

American football player (born 1974)

No. 63, 64
- Position: Guard

Personal information
- Born: March 16, 1974 (age 52); Greensboro, North Carolina, U.S.
- Listed height: 6 ft 4 in (1.93 m)
- Listed weight: 300 lb (136 kg)

Career information
- High school: Walter H. Page (NC)
- College: East Carolina
- NFL draft: 1997: 5th round, 131st overall pick

Career history
- New York Jets (1997–1998); Philadelphia Eagles (1998)*; Washington Redskins (1998); Las Vegas Outlaws (2001)
- * Offseason or practice squad member only

Career NFL statistics
- Games played: 4
- Games started: 3
- Stats at Pro Football Reference

Lamont Antonio Burns (born March 16, 1974) is an American former professional football player who was a guard in the National Football League (NFL) for the New York Jets and Washington Redskins. Burns attended Walter Hines Page Senior High School in Greensboro, North Carolina, and went to East Carolina University on a football scholarship to play college football for the East Carolina Pirates. He was selected 131st overall in the fifth round of the 1997 NFL draft. He now currently coaches the Westbury Dragons High School Football team.
