= Jake Knapp (baseball) =

American baseball player (born 2000)

Chicago Cubs
- Pitcher
- Born: August 30, 2000 (age 26); Greensboro, North Carolina, U.S.
- Bats: Right Throws: Right

Career highlights and awards
- National Pitcher of the Year Award (2025)

Jacob Michael Knapp (born August 30, 2000) is an American professional baseball pitcher in the Chicago Cubs organization. He played college baseball for the UNC Wilmington Seahawks, Walters State Senators, and North Carolina Tar Heels.

== Amateur career ==
Knapp was raised in Greensboro, North Carolina, where he attended Walter Hines Page Senior High School and played baseball. During his senior year at Page, Knapp registered a 5–0 record with a 1.31 ERA and 87 strikeouts, being named the Metro Conference Pitcher of the Year as a result.

Despite his performance in high school, Knapp received no official offers to play college baseball, and instead enrolled at the University of North Carolina Wilmington as a preferred walk-on for their baseball team. During his sole year at UNC Wilmington, Knapp did not appear in any games.

Following his freshman year, Knapp was cut from UNC Wilmington's baseball team. Soon after, Knapp was recruited by Walters State Community College, with head coach David Shelton convincing Knapp to enroll based on Walters State's track record of elevating their baseball players into Division I athletes. After his first few appearances with Walters State, Knapp was contacted by the North Carolina Tar Heels pitching coach Bryant Gaines, who informed Knapp that North Carolina would be monitoring him throughout the season. In his first year at Walters State, Knapp finished the season with a 6.11 ERA, culminating in Gaines refusing to offer Knapp a spot on North Carolina's roster. Following the season, Knapp considered abandoning his baseball career and transferring to the University of Georgia, only being talked out of it after multiple hours-long conversations with Shelton. Knapp greatly improved during his second year at Walters State, setting a school record in wins with a 14–1 record along with 111 strikeouts and a 2.12 ERA.

On March 14, 2022, Knapp was again contacted by Gaines, this time with Knapp accepting an offer to play baseball for North Carolina. In his debut with North Carolina, Knapp went 5 2/3 innings with two hits and two walks allowed, along with four strikeouts, in a win against Longwood. Knapp finished his first season at North Carolina with a 5.04 ERA and 65 strikeouts in 64 1/3 innings. In January 2024, Knapp tore his UCL during practice, causing him to undergo Tommy John surgery and miss the entire 2024 season as a result. Instead, Knapp took on a mentor capacity to freshmen and incoming transfers for North Carolina.

Knapp returned for North Carolina in 2025, and in his first game back, he allowed one run off of two hits along with 3 strikeouts in a win against Texas Tech. On March 28, Knapp set a career high with ten strikeouts in 7.0 innings, along with five hits and no runs allowed, in a win against Miami (FL). On May 15, Knapp pitched a complete game in a win against Florida State, his longest collegiate outing, along with allowing three runs off of four hits and seven strikeouts. During the season, Knapp was named as a semifinalist for the Dick Howser Trophy and the Golden Spikes Award. Following his final collegiate game, a win against Arizona in the Chapel Hill Regional, Knapp tied the program record with his fourteenth win, finishing the season 14–0 with 88 strikeouts and a 2.02 ERA in 102 1/3 innings. By the conclusion of the year, Knapp received the ACC Pitcher of the Year Award and the National Pitcher of the Year Award. Knapp was also tabbed as a consensus All-American.

== Professional career ==
Knapp was selected by the Chicago Cubs in the eighth round with the 241st overall pick in the 2025 Major League Baseball draft. He signed with the Cubs for $175,000 and was subsequently assigned to the ACL Cubs of the Arizona Complex League. On April 2, 2026, Knapp was promoted to the Double-A Knoxville Smokies, and finished the season with the Mesa Solar Sox of the Arizona Fall League.
