= White House Initiative on Asian Americans, Native Hawaiians, and Pacific Islanders =

United States governmental office

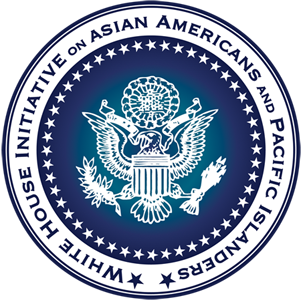

Agency overview
- Formed: June 7, 1999
- Parent agency: US Department of Health and Human Services
- Website: www.hhs.gov/about/whiaanhpi/index.html

The White House Initiative on Asian Americans, Native Hawaiians, and Pacific Islanders (WHIAANHPI) was a United States governmental office first created on June 7, 1999, under the Clinton Administration that coordinated an ambitious whole-of-government approach to advance equity, justice, and opportunity for Asian Americans, Native Hawaiians, and Pacific Islanders (AA and NHPIs). In its most recent iteration during the Biden Administration, the Initiative collaborated with the Deputy Assistant to the President and AA and NHPI Senior Liaison, White House Office of Public Engagement and designated federal departments and agencies to advance equity, justice, and opportunity for AA and NHPIs in the areas of economic development, education, health and human services, housing, environment, arts, agriculture, labor and employment, transportation, justice, veterans affairs, and community development.

In its 25 years in existence, the Initiative sought to highlight the tremendous unmet needs in AA and NHPI communities and the dynamic community assets that could be leveraged to meet many of those needs. The Initiative focused on cross-cutting priority areas that spanned all issue areas and agencies, including advancing disaggregated AA and NHPI data collection and dissemination, workforce diversity, ensuring access (especially linguistic access and cultural competence) for limited English proficient individuals, and building capacity for the AA and NHPI community. The Initiative also worked to encourage AA and NHPI involvement in public service and civic engagement opportunities.

On January 20, 2025, President Donald Trump revoked Executive Order 14031, which had re-established the Initiative under the Biden Administration, leading to WHIAANHPI's closure as well as the shuttering of the President's Advisory Commission on Asian Americans, Native Hawaiians, and Pacific Islanders (PACAANHPI).

== History ==
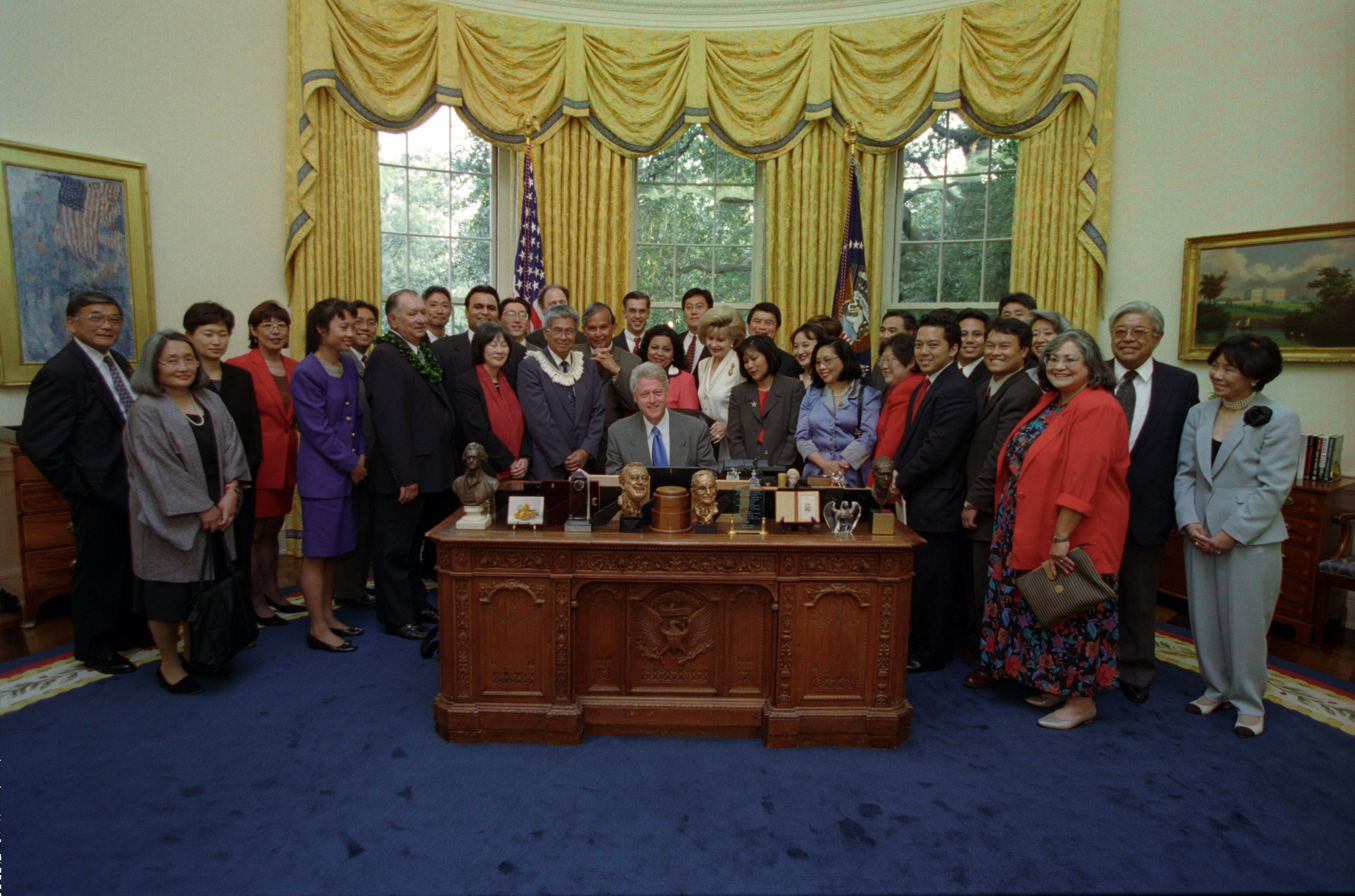
President Bill Clinton signs Executive Order 13125 creating the White House Initiative on Asian Americans and Pacific Islanders on June 7, 1999

=== Clinton Administration ===
On June 7, 1999, President Bill Clinton signed Executive Order 13125 to establish the first White House Initiative on Asian Americans and Pacific Islanders "in order to improve the quality of life of Asian Americans and Pacific Islanders through increased participation in federal programs where they may be underserved (e.g., health, human services, education, housing, labor, transportation, and economic and community development)." The Executive Order called on all federal departments to mobilize their resources to address the unmet needs of Asian Americans and Pacific Islanders.

Prior to the signing of Executive Order 13125, the last United States Presidential Executive Order related to AAPIs was Executive Order 9066, which led to the internment of Japanese Americans during World War II.

Under the Clinton Administration, the Executive Order housed the Initiative under the U.S. Department of Health and Human Services, in the Health Resources and Services Administration.

==== Executive director and commission ====
The first Initiative Executive Director Shamina Singh was appointed by Secretary of Health and Human Services Donna Shalala. Prior to her work at the Initiative, Singh served as special assistant to the Secretary at the U.S. Department of Labor and worked on specialized health care issues for the Service Employees International Union.

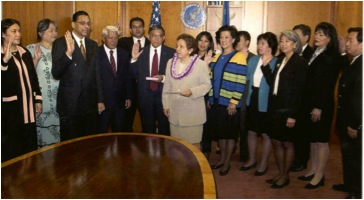
Executive Director Shamina Singh meets with the inaugural members of the President's Advisory Commission on Asian Americans and Pacific Islanders.

The first President's Advisory Commission on Asian Americans and Pacific Islanders was chaired by former Congressman Norman Mineta. The 15-member President's Advisory Commission was seated through June 7, 2001.

==== Priorities ====
The Interagency Working Group under the Clinton Administration was chaired by then Deputy Secretary of the U.S. Department of Health and Human Services Kevin Thurm. The IWG was composed of leaders from 32 federal agencies and departments. As part of the Executive Order, each federal agency and department was required to draft an integrated agency plan including measurable objectives and implementation goals to better serve the AAPI community.

The first commission report highlighted four key themes:

- AAPIs have been "MIH" – "Missing In History" – as taught in classrooms, as reflected in the media and the arts and as understood by government policymakers and program planners. In much of the data used by the federal government, Asian Americans and Pacific Islanders are invisible, relegated to a residual category of "Other."
- Native Hawaiians and Pacific Islanders (NHPIs) often remain a footnote or asterisk as part of the broad "Asian American and Pacific Islander" category, ignoring their importance and dignity as diverse, indigenous peoples. Barely ever noted is the manner in which the United States acquired Hawaii, Guam, the Commonwealth of the Northern Mariana Islands, and American Samoa.
- Asian Americans are stereotyped as a "model minority": passive, compliant, overachieving and without problems or needs.
- Asian Americans continue to be viewed as perpetual foreigners, forever "aliens" whose loyalty and place in America is always questioned.

The report left several recommendations, including that federal agencies improve data collection measures, ensure linguistic access in AAPI languages, protect civil rights and equal opportunity for AAPIs, strengthen community capacity, and recognize NHPIs in federal programs and services.

=== Bush Administration ===
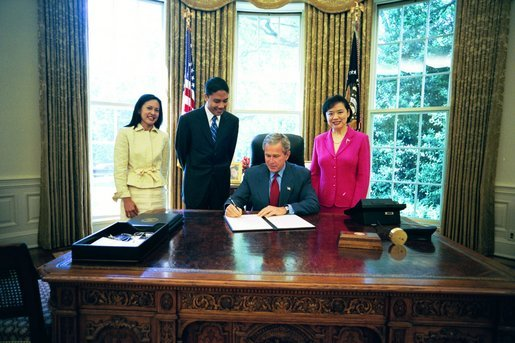
President George W. Bush signs Executive Order 13339 to increase economic opportunities for and improve the quality of life AAPIs on May 13, 2004.

On June 6, 2001, President George W. Bush signed Executive Order 13216, renewing the Initiative and changing the Order's title from: "Increasing Participation of Asian Americans and Pacific Islanders in Federal Programs" to "Increasing Opportunity and Improving Quality of Life of Asian Americans and Pacific Islanders." At this time, Deputy Secretary Claude A. Allen of the U.S. Department of Health and Human Services was named Chair of the Interagency Working Group.

On May 13, 2004, President Bush signed Executive Order 13339, superseding Executive Order 13125 and moving the Initiative from the Department of Health and Human Services to the U.S. Department of Commerce.

President Bush signed Executive Order 13403 on May 12, 2006, once again reauthorizing the Initiative.

==== Executive director and commission ====
In 2001, John Quoc Duong was named executive director of the initiative. Prior to assuming his appointment, Duong served as Vice President of Bridgecreek Group, Inc. and was deputy director of the Office of Community Relations for California Governor Pete Wilson.

In 2004, Eddy Badrina was appointed as executive director of the Initiative. Prior to joining the initiative, Badrina was an appointee to the White House Liaison Office at the U.S. Department of State, working on the Bush Administration's transition efforts.

In 2006, Jimmy D. Lee began his term as executive director for the initiative. Before joining the initiative as executive director, Lee was a Commissioner on the President's Advisory Commission on Asian Americans and Pacific Islanders and served as executive director of the Chicago Chinatown Chamber of Commerce. He was also a former Special Assistant to the Governor in the State of Illinois. During his time at the White House, Lee was named one of Crain's 40 Under 40. He left the position to run for United States Congress in the 11th Congressional District in Illinois.

The executive order included new criteria for selecting Commissioners to serve on the President's Advisory Commission for Asian Americans and Pacific Islanders, including requirements that candidates "have a history of involvement with the Asian American and Pacific Islander communities; are from the business enterprise sector; are from civic associations representing one or more of the diverse Asian American and Pacific Islander communities; are from the fields of economic, social, and community development; or have such other experience as the President deems appropriate."

==== Priorities ====
Under the Bush Administration economic development became the priority of the Initiative. Executive Order 13339 stated its purpose as "providing equal economic opportunities for full participation of Asian American and Pacific Islander businesses in our free market economy where they may be underserved and thus improving the quality of life for Asian Americans and Pacific Islanders."

The White House Initiative on Asian Americans and Pacific Islanders (WHIAAPI) under President George W. Bush focused on three key priorities: increasing the appointment of Asian Pacific Americans (APAs) to senior government positions and commissions, providing capacity development and resources for small businesses and community-based organizations through federal partnerships, and advancing legislation that strengthened small business support for the APA community.

During the Bush Administration, WHIAAPI launched NEXT Conferences, a series of 30 capacity-building workshops held in major cities, including Philadelphia, New York, Chicago, Los Angeles, and Houston, to provide technical assistance and federal resources to small businesses and nonprofits. Additionally, following Hurricane Katrina, WHIAAPI deployed staff and Commissioners to New Orleans to assist displaced Vietnamese American fishermen in rebuilding their livelihoods.

A key milestone was the first White House Summit on Asian Americans and Pacific Islanders, held in Washington, D.C., which gathered leaders from federal agencies, members of Congress, and community stakeholders to discuss government resources available to the APA community. Throughout its tenure, the Initiative prioritized bipartisan collaboration, ensuring that both Democratic and Republican leaders were involved in delivering resources and events to support the APA community.

Several individuals played critical roles in executing the Initiative's programs and priorities during the Bush Administration: Erik Wang, Associate Director; Piyachat Terrell, Associate Director; and the following Staff Associates and Programming Managers: Cianna Ferrer, Michelle Wong, Stephanie Le, and Christine Choi. These staff members worked to coordinate federal agency partnerships, organize events, and manage outreach efforts to ensure the effective implementation of WHIAAPI's mission

The President's Advisory Commission on Asian Americans and Pacific Islanders and the Federal Interagency Working Group worked primarily on the following goals during this time:

- Developed, monitored and coordinated federal efforts to improve Asian American and Pacific Islander participation in government programs;
- Fostered research and data collection for Asian American and Pacific Islander businesses and communities; and
- Increased their level of participation in the national economy and their economic and community development.

Commissioners included: Betty Wu Adams (chair), Rudy Pamintuan (chair), Nina Collier, Jeff Sakaguchi, Derrick Nguyen, William Kil, Vellie Dietrich-Hall, Joseph Melookaran, Kenneth Wong, and Howard Li.

=== Obama Administration ===
On October 14, 2009, President Obama signed Executive Order 13515, reestablishing the Initiative and superseding Executive Orders 13125 and 13339. The Executive Order moved the Initiative from the Department of Commerce to the Department of Education. President Obama appointed then Secretary of Education Arne Duncan along with then Secretary of Commerce Gary Locke as heads of the Interagency Working Group.

Amendments to the Executive Order include Executive Order 13585 and Executive Order 13652 which both ensure the continuance of the Federal Advisory Committees.

==== Executive director and commission ====
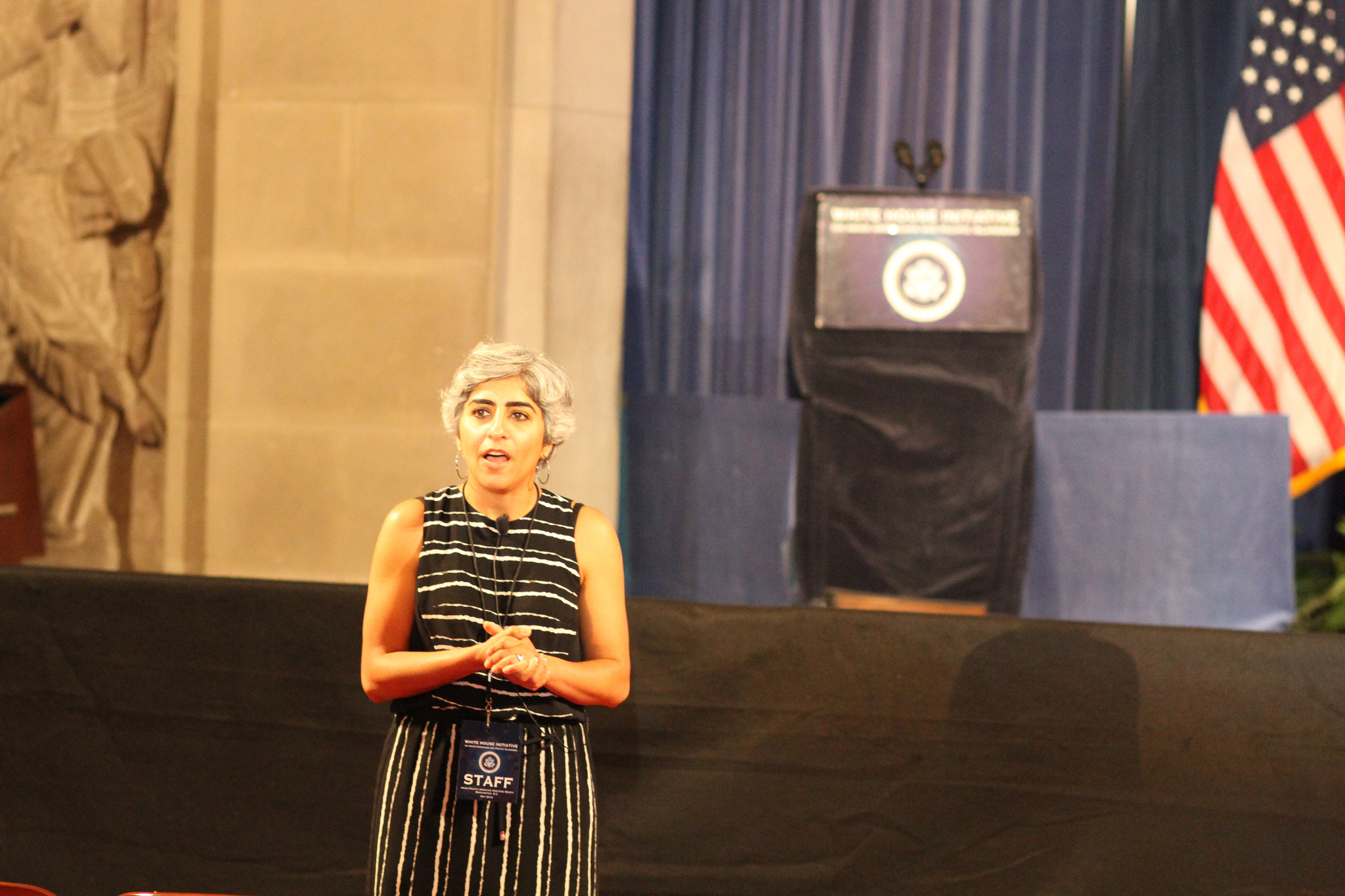
Kiran Ahuja delivers opening remarks at the Asian American and Pacific Islander Heritage Month Opening Ceremony on May 6, 2014.

Kiran Ahuja was appointed on December 14, 2009, to the position of executive director of the Initiative. Prior to her work at the Initiative, Ahuja served as founding executive director of the National Asian Pacific American Women's Forum (NAPAWF) and worked at the U.S. Department of Justice Civil Rights Division.

In 2015, Doua Thor became the executive director of the Initiative, following the departure of Ahuja. Prior to taking on the position, Thor had worked with the Initiative as a senior advisor and member of the President's Advisory Commission. A refugee herself, Thor is the former executive director of the Southeast Asian Resource Action Center (SEARAC).

The commission included 20 members and was chaired by Dr. Tung Thanh Nguyen with Dr. Mary Ann Young Okada as Vice Chair. Other Commissioners include: Dr. Nina Ahmad; Michael Byun; Lt. Col. Ravi Chaudhary; Lian Cheun; Billy Dec; Jacob James Fitisemanu Jr.; Bill Imada, Kathy Ko Chin, Daphne Kwok, Dee Jay Mailer, Diane Narasaki, Shekar Narasimhan, Maulik Pancholy, Linda X. Phan, Sanjita Pradhan, Lorna May Ho Randlett, Bo Thao-Urabe, and Dr. Paul Y. Watanabe.

Past Administration co-chairs of the Initiative are Chris Lu, who served with Secretary Arne Duncan during his tenure as Cabinet Secretary and Assistant to President Obama, and Gary Locke during his term as Secretary of Commerce.

==== Priorities ====
Under the Obama Administration, the Initiative has worked to expand the outreach capacity of the Commission and IWG. The IWG created and implemented agency plans to increase the AAPI community's access to federal programs and services, housing four subcommittees that coincide with the initiative's four cross-cutting goal areas of research and data disaggregation, language access, workforce diversity, and capacity building. These subcommittees respond to the community, share best practices, and recommend strategic goals that can be incorporated into agency plans

The Initiative also formed a regional IWG, called the Regional Network, of more than 250 regional administrators, district directors, and regional staff to help facilitate information sharing and coordinate community engagement with the AAPI community across the federal regional agencies. The Regional Network meets quarterly to share information and discuss ways in which regional offices can work together, convenes regional roundtables with local AAPI communities, builds partnerships between the federal regional offices, the commission, and the local and state commissions, and submits an annual progress report on its engagement efforts.

The Initiative has also worked more extensively on data disaggregation, hosting a national symposium in partnership with National Commission on Asian American and Pacific Islander Research in Education to relay best practices for data collection, analysis, and dissemination.

In addition, the Initiative has advised federal agencies on disaster response efforts after the Gulf Coast Oil Spill, released an AAPI women's record, developed educational tools and resources on the Affordable Care Act, and helped launch the Senior Executive Service (SES) Development Program. The initiative has also seen the creation of a Nail Salon Interagency Working Group, created a federal resources page with grants and training information, and worked with the Federal Asian Pacific American Council (FAPAC) on challenge issues for the community.

Other key accomplishments and priorities of the Initiative under the Obama Administration include:

- Organizing the first-ever White House Summit on AAPIs. Nearly 2,000 community members and federal officials from over 40 states and the Pacific Islands came together to share their experiences and gain tools to mobilize their communities to further expand opportunities for AAPIs through federal resources and programs. Six Cabinet Secretaries and multiple federal agency leaders joined the Summit and highlighted their work benefiting the AAPI community.
- Advancing data collection, analysis, and dissemination on AAPI communities. The Initiative launched Data.gov/AAPI, the most comprehensive hub of government data on AAPIs. The Initiative also convened data experts during two iCount Symposiums and released a best practices report to promote innovative approaches and methodologies to further disaggregate race and ethnicity data within federal agencies.
- Supporting Native Hawaiian and Pacific Islander communities. The Initiative led the Administration's first-ever regional summit in Guam to discuss specific needs of the community for grant programs, capacity building, and technical assistance. The Commission held its first-ever listening session in Hawaii to discuss Native Hawaiian needs and opportunities. In addition, the Initiative supported the Department of Interior in its engagements to create an administrative procedure for re-establishing a government-to-government relationship.
- Promoting Public-Private Partnerships. During the first-ever National Philanthropic Briefing on AAPIs in 2012, the Ford Foundation, W.K. Kellogg Foundation, and Kresge Foundation made a commitment of $1 million, the first-of-its-kind coordinated public and philanthropic investment in the AAPI community.
- Engaging a new generation of young leaders in understanding the federal resources dedicated to college affordability, bullying prevention, mental health, pathways to public service, naturalization, and the Deferred Action for Childhood Arrivals (DACA) policy through the E3! Ambassadors Program and annual White House AAPI Youth Forums.
- Expanding healthcare access for AAPI communities. Nearly 2 million previously uninsured AAPIs became eligible for coverage under the Affordable Care Act (ACA), and the Initiative worked to get AAPIs covered under the ACA through collaboration with the Department of Health and Human Services, community health centers, and ethnic media.
- Welcoming and creating opportunity for immigrants and new Americans through the Stand Stronger Citizenship Awareness Campaign, in-language outreach around the DACA program, and roundtables with the Task Force on New Americans.
- Forging educational equity for AAPI students through support of Asian American and Native American Pacific Islander-Serving Institutions (AANAPISIs).
- Supporting AAPI-owned businesses. Through coordination with the Minority Business Development Agency and AAPI chambers of commerce, the Initiative works to ensure AAPI businesses are equipped with the knowledge to compete for grants and government contracts.
- Protecting vulnerable AAPI workers. The Initiative participates in two interagency working groups addressing the needs of vulnerable workers in high-risk and low-wage industries and the myriad of health and safety issues affecting AAPI nail salon workers, who account for 40 percent of the national nail salon workforce.
- Protecting the civil rights of AAPI communities. The Initiative launched the interagency AAPI Bullying Prevention Task Force to analyze data and formulate effective policies to better understand and address bullying. The Task Force hosted more than 25 listening sessions, and the Initiative launched the Act To Change national public awareness campaign with translated resources and a coalition of 50+ supporting organizations and influencers, including George Takei and Jeremy Lin, encouraging youth to take the pledge against bullying.

=== First Trump Administration ===
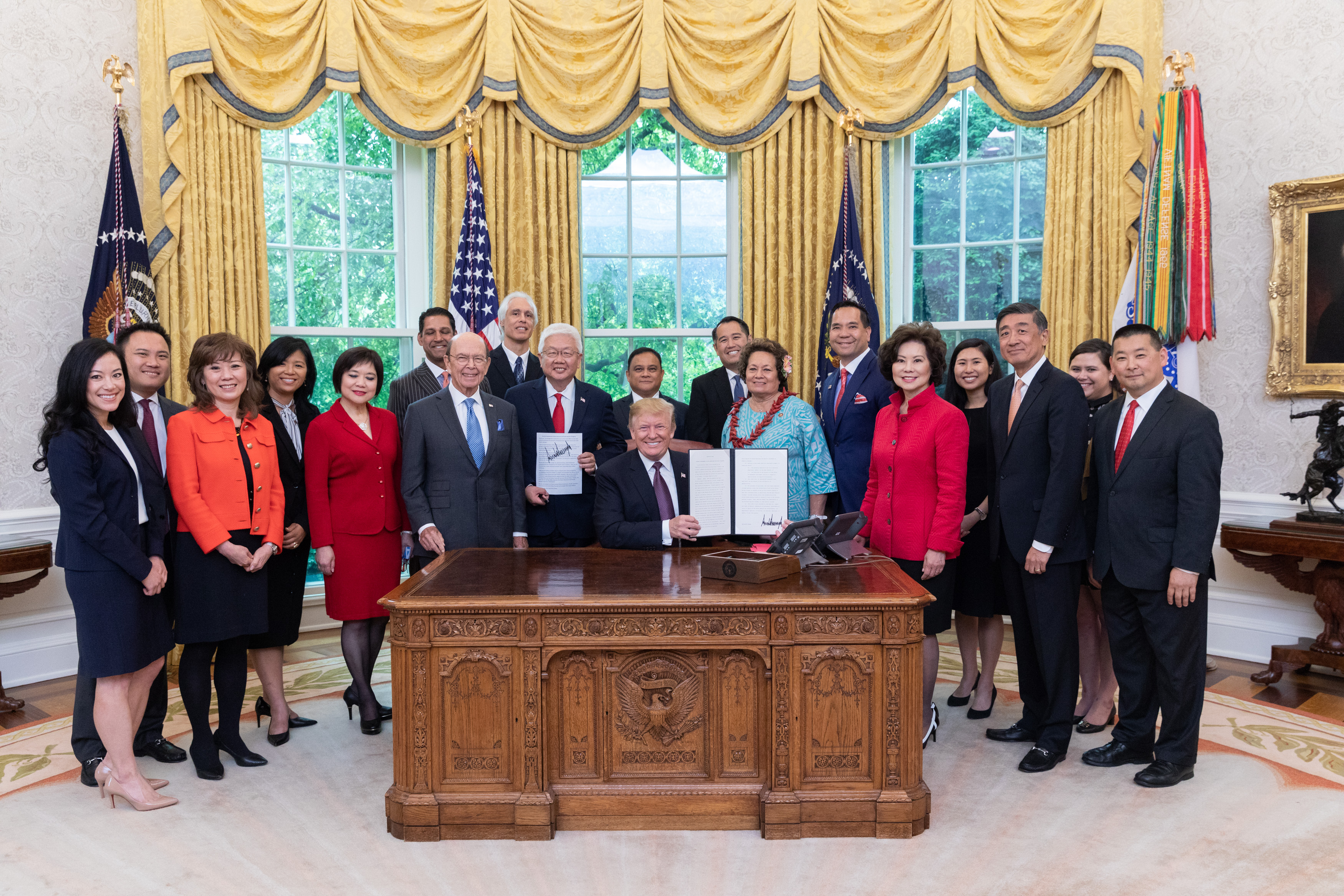
President Donald Trump signs Executive Order 13872 to help broaden access to economic resources for the AAPI community on May 13, 2019.

On May 13, 2019, President Trump signed Executive Order 13872 once again reestablishing the Initiative. The order effectively reversed the transfer made by President Obama and moved the Initiative from the Department of Education back to the Department of Commerce. President Trump appointed then Secretary of Commerce Wilbur Ross and then Secretary of Transportation Elaine Chao serve as the Co-Chairs of the Initiative.

The order also established an Advisory Commission on Asian Americans and Pacific Islanders (AAPI) to help broaden access to more employers and other economic resources for the AAPI community.

==== Executive director and commission ====
On November 13, 2017, Holly Ham was appointed as executive director of the Initiative. Prior to this appointment, Ham served as Assistant Secretary for Management at the U.S. Department of Education, also in the Trump Administration.

On December 17, 2019, the Department of Commerce confirmed that Tina Wei Smith, a Former Department of Labor appointee, would replace Ham as executive director. Ms. Smith was a former graduate of the University of Illinois and a key advisor of then Secretary of Labor Elaine Chao.

On January 27, 2020, Vice President Mike Pence swore in 13 members of the President's Advisory Commission on Asian Americans and Pacific Islanders including Paul S. Hsu, Congresswoman Amata C. Radewagen, Herman Martir, Governor Eddie Calvo, Doris Flores Brooks, Grace Y. Lee, Prem Parameswaran, Michelle P. Steel, Chiling Tong, Jennifer Carnahan, George Leing, Jan-Ie Low, and Keiko Orrall.

=== Biden Administration ===
On May 28, 2021, President Biden signed Executive Order 14031 reestablishing the Initiative at the Department of Health and Human Services and renaming it the White House Initiative on Asian Americans, Native Hawaiians, and Pacific Islanders (WHIAANHPI). On December 9, 2021, the Department of Health and Human Services announced that U.S. Trade Representative Ambassador Katherine Tai would become a co-chair of the Initiative alongside Health and Human Services Secretary Xavier Becerra. Each entity of the Initiative worked to "advance equity, justice, and opportunity for AA and NHPI communities in the United States."

==== Priorities ====
According to Executive Order 14031, the Initiative was tasked with advancing "equity, justice, and opportunity for AA and NHPI communities by coordinating Federal interagency policymaking and program development efforts to eliminate barriers to equity, justice, and opportunity faced by AA and NHPI communities, including by advancing policies, programs, and initiatives." This includes:

- identify and eliminate any existing institutional policies or barriers within Federal programs and services that may disadvantage or burden AA and NHPI communities;
- improve safety, access to justice, and violence prevention for AA and NHPI communities, including by preventing, reporting, addressing, and better tracking acts of hate and bias (such as acts of hate and bias at the intersection of gender-based violence);
- promote inclusion and belonging for AA and NHPI communities, including by expanding public education and knowledge of AA and NHPI people and their diverse cultures, languages, and histories;
- expand the collection and use of disaggregated data at the Federal, State and local level on AA and NHPI communities, and facilitate improved research on policy and program outcomes for AA and NHPI communities, in coordination with the Interagency Working Group on Equitable Data established by Executive Order 13985;
- end language access and other barriers faced by AA and NHPI communities in accessing government benefits and services;
- improve health outcomes, eliminate health disparities, and expand access to quality, affordable, and culturally competent medical and mental healthcare services for AA and NHPI individuals and communities;
- end disparities in educational outcomes for AA and NHPI youth and students of all ages, and address barriers to learning, including bullying, harassment, and other forms of discrimination at school;
- address the concentration of poverty facing many AA and NHPI communities, including by identifying and addressing disparities in access to safe, affordable housing and homeownership;
- expand economic opportunity for AA and NHPI families, including by advancing opportunities for AA and NHPI entrepreneurs and small businesses, supporting access to jobs and workforce training for AA and NHPI communities, promoting AA and NHPI participation and success in the private sector, ensuring workplaces are free from race and national origin harassment and other forms of employment discrimination, and ensuring AA and NHPI communities can access consumer and finance protections;
- increase opportunities for civic engagement, such as electoral participation, within AA and NHPI communities;
- improve the equitable allocation of Federal resources, including through Federal funds, contracts, grants, and awards, to AA and NHPI communities and AA and NHPI-serving organizations;
- support AA and NHPI communities in responding to and recovering from national or regional crises and public health emergencies, including the COVID-19 pandemic and related economic crisis;
- secure climate and environmental justice for AA and NHPI communities who are particularly impacted by the climate crisis and are overburdened by environmental degradation; and
- identify ways to foster the recruitment, career and leadership development, retention, advancement, and participation of AA and NHPI public servants at all levels of the Federal workforce.

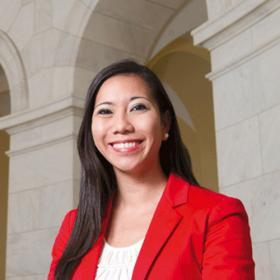
Executive Director of WHIAANHPI, Krystal Ka'ai

==== Executive director and commission ====
On May 28, 2021, Biden appointed Krystal Ka'ai to be executive director of the Initiative. Ka'ai previously served as executive director of the Congressional Asian Pacific American Caucus and is the first Native Hawaiian to lead the Initiative.

On December 20, 2021, Biden announced his intent to nominate 25 individuals to the President's Advisory Commission on Asian Americans, Native Hawaiians, and Pacific Islanders including Amy Agbayani, Teresita Batayola, Ajay Bhutoria, Luisa Blue, Kimberly Chang, Emily Chen, Kerry Doi, Grace Huang, Victoria Huynh, Mia Ives-Rublee, Kamal Kalsi, Michelle Ka'uhane, Daniel Dae Kim, Kevin D. Kim, Sarah Min, Simon Pang, Ai-jen Poo, Naheed Qureshi, Raynald Samoa, Sonal Shah, Smita N. Shah, Robert A. Underwood, and KaYing Yang.

On October 7, 2024, the Initiative announced Ka'ai's departure, and that Helen Beaudreau had been appointed by Biden as its new executive director.

The Commission provided advice to the President on:

- the development, monitoring, and coordination of executive branch efforts to advance equity, justice, and opportunity for AA and NHPI communities in the United States, including efforts to close gaps in health, socioeconomic, employment, and educational outcomes;
- policies to address and end anti-Asian bias, xenophobia, racism, and nativism, and opportunities for the executive branch to advance inclusion, belonging, and public awareness of the diversity and accomplishments of AA and NHPI people, cultures, and histories;
- policies, programs, and initiatives to prevent, report, respond to, and track anti-Asian hate crimes and hate incidents;
- ways in which the Federal Government can build on the capacity and contributions of AA and NHPI communities through equitable Federal funding, grantmaking, and employment opportunities;
- policies and practices to improve research and equitable data disaggregation regarding AA and NHPI communities;
- policies and practices to improve language access services to ensure AA and NHPI communities can access Federal programs and services; and
- strategies to increase public- and private-sector collaboration, and community involvement in improving the safety and socioeconomic, health, educational, occupational, and environmental well‑being of AA and NHPI communities.

The initiative contained both an Interagency Working Group and Regional Network.

==== Interagency Working Group ====
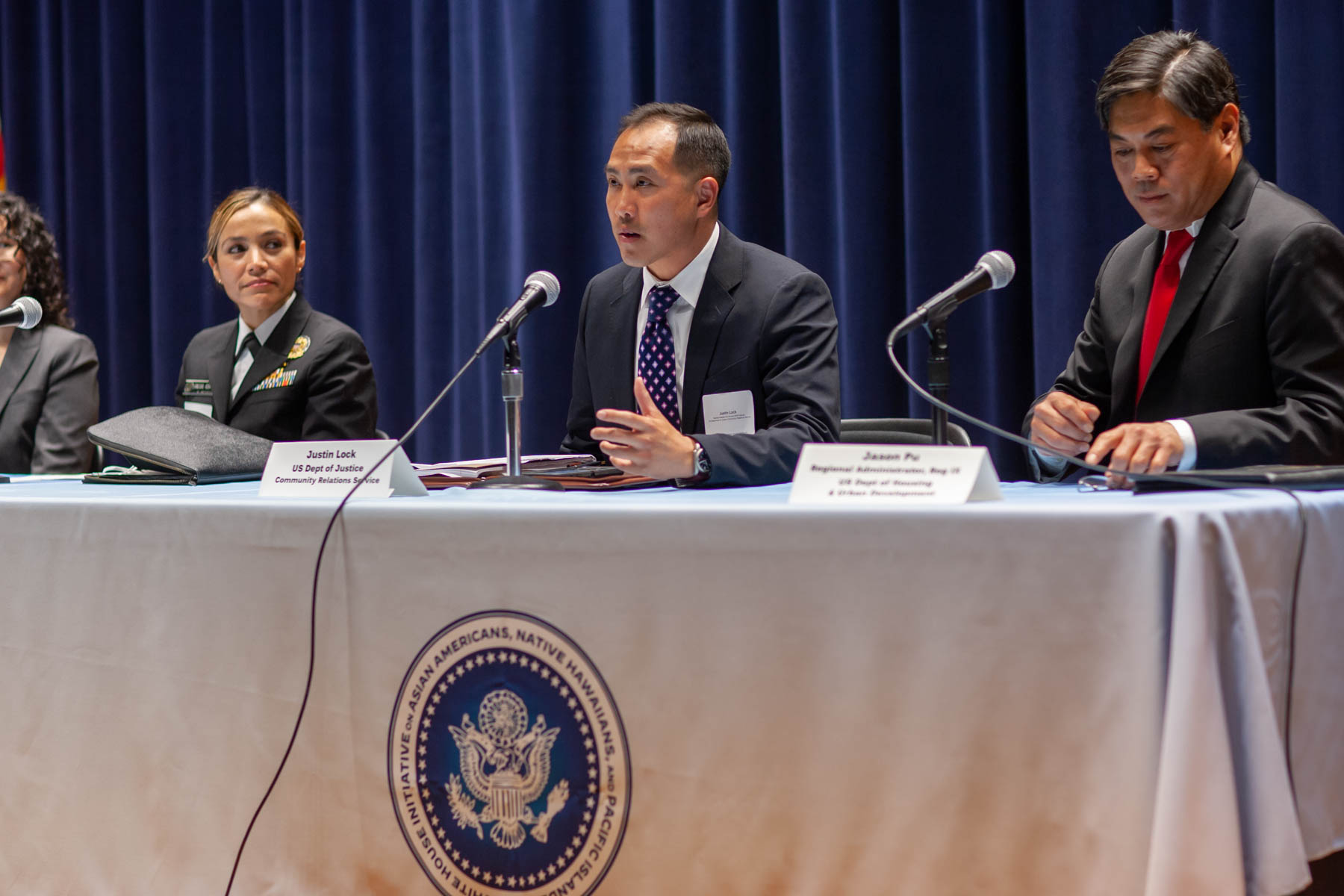
Justin Lock, Region 9 Northern California co-lead, speaking at an WHIAANHPI Regional Network event

President Biden's Executive Order (EO) 14031 established a federal Interagency Working Group (IWG) as part of the White House Initiative on Asian Americans, Native Hawaiians, and Pacific Islanders (WHIAANHPI). The IWG was composed of senior-level Executive Branch officials who were designated by their respective agencies to coordinate WHIAANHPI's work across the federal government. The IWG worked to advance equity, justice, and opportunity for AA and NHPI communities by coordinating federal interagency policymaking, program development, and outreach efforts to address barriers impacting AA and NHPI communities. Examples of these objectives include: identifying federal programs in which AAPIs may be underserved; fostering research and data collection on AAPI populations and subpopulations; increasing public and private sector community involvement in improving the health, environment, and opportunities for AAPIs; and identifying ways to recruit and advance AAPIs in federal service.

===== Regional Network =====
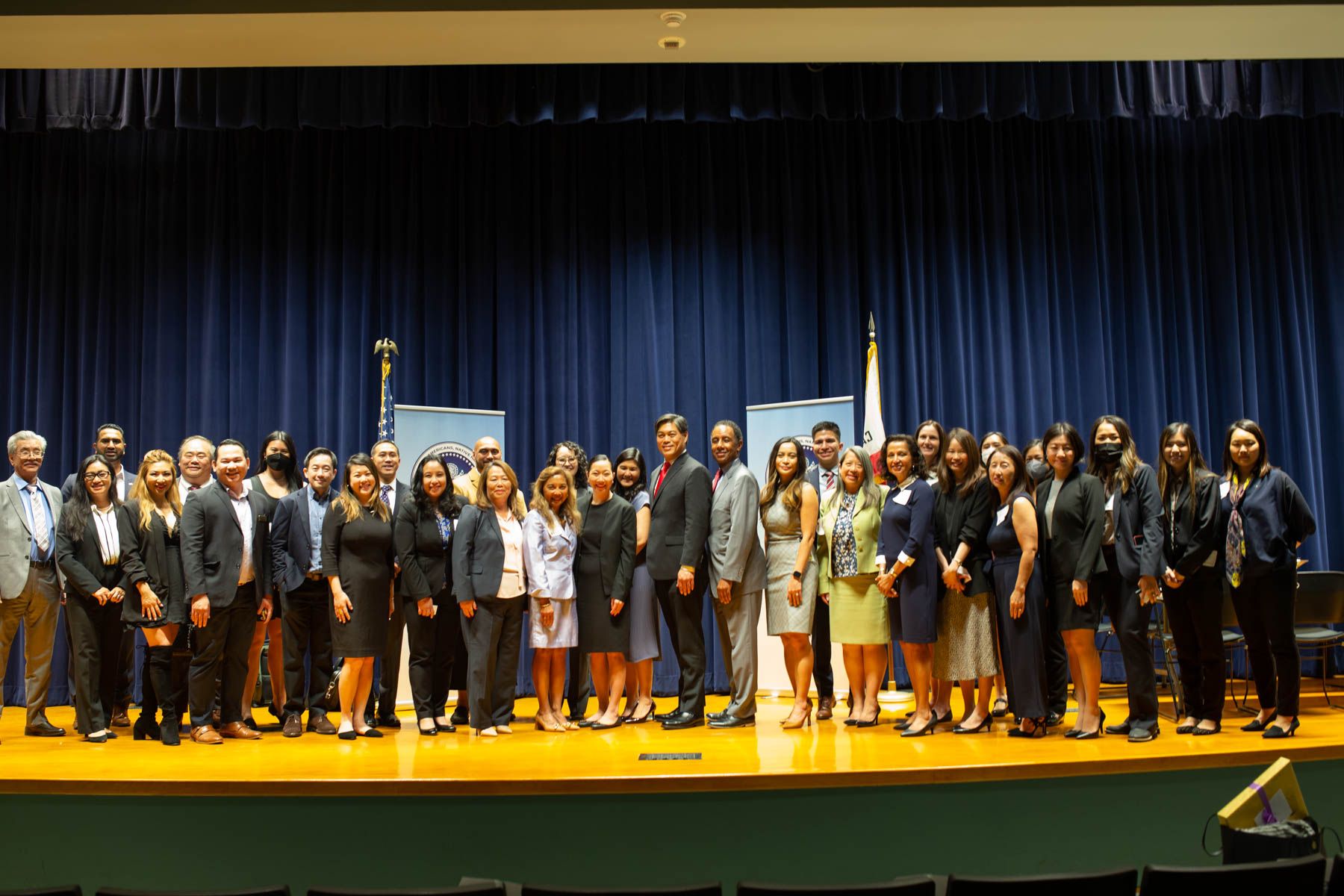
Group photo of the Regional Network leads, from Region 9, and other participants of WHIAANHPI

The White House Initiative on Asian Americans, Native Hawaiians, and Pacific Islanders (WHIAANHPI) was charged with coordinating and supporting an existing Regional Network (RN) of federal officials who facilitated improved communication, engagement, and coordination between the federal government and Asian American, Native Hawaiian, and Pacific Islander (AA and NHPI) communities throughout the United States.

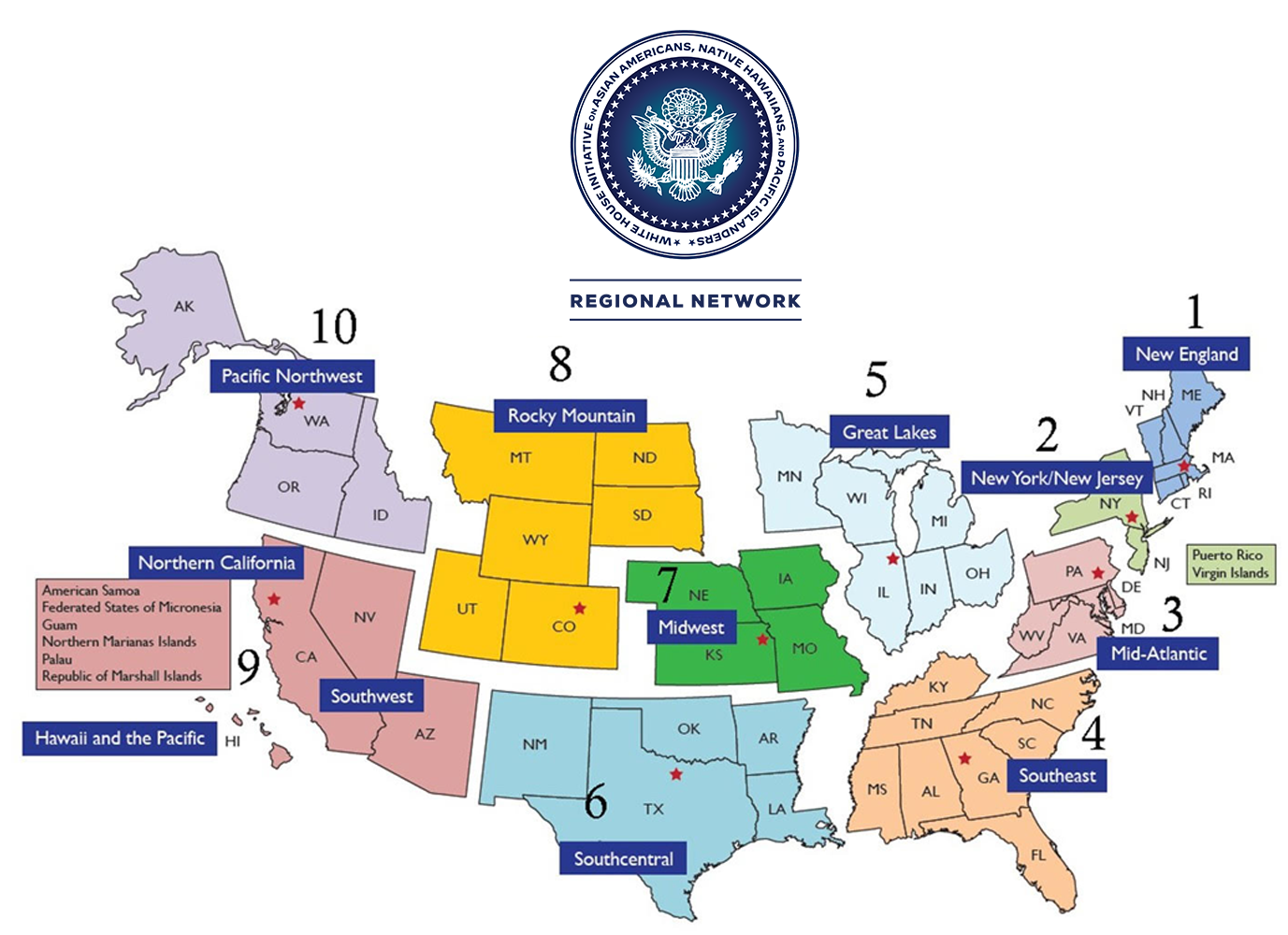
Map of the WHIAANHPI Regional Network

The Regional Network (RN) institutionalized the work of the Interagency Working Group (IWG) on a more local level across 10 federal regions. The RN facilitated the exchange of information across regional offices, coordinated community engagement efforts with other federal agencies, and collaborated with Initiative staff and IWG members in D.C. to potentially incorporate specific community recommendations into agency plans. Through regional roundtables, technical assistance programs, regular planning calls, resource-sharing, in-person convenings, and webinars, the RN worked on the ground to respond to community needs. The Regional Network included over 400 federal agency officials based in the 10 federal agency administrative regions. They sought to build relationships between the federal government and AA and NHPI communities by coordinating outreach efforts and connecting community stakeholders with federal resources across regional offices.

==== Efforts by Biden's Initiative ====
Under Biden, the White House Initiative on Asian Americans Native Hawaiians and Pacific Islanders (WHIAANHPI) has participated in various efforts across government agencies and nonprofits to promote equity and alleviate issues stemming from COVID-19. Through the use of public outreach and funding, these efforts have been robust in tackling a variety of issues faced by the AANHPI community. These are a few examples of those efforts:

- In October 2021, the Justice Department announced that its Office of Justice Programs (OJP) would award more than $21 million to state and local partners to investigate and prosecute hate crimes and assist hate crime victims.
- The "Slow the Spread" campaign and the "Building Vaccine Confidence" campaign, which includes public information about vaccines in 14 AA and NHPI languages.
- In July 2022, the Department of Housing and Urban Development (HUD) made available over $19 million in American Rescue Plan (ARP) funding for the Fair Housing Initiatives Program to address discriminatory housing practices related to the COVID-19 pandemic.
- The American Rescue Plan provided more than $36 billion in support to institutions of higher education, including institutions that primarily serve AA and NHPI students, to ensure learning continues during the COVID-19 pandemic.
- The Department of Interior's Office of Insular Affairs provided $55 million in CARES Act grants to support Pacific Islander communities in United States territories and Insular Area Pacific Islander populations in the contiguous United States prepare for, prevent, and protect against COVID-19.
- HHS's Health Resources and Services Administration awarded $20 million to six Native Hawaiian Health Care Improvement Act award recipients in August 2021 to strengthen vaccination efforts, respond to and mitigate the spread of COVID-19, and enhance health care services and infrastructure in their communities.

Through the Indigenous Communities program, the Department of Commerce's Economic Development Agency (EDA) is allocating $100 million in American Rescue Plan funding specifically for Indigenous communities, including Pacific Islanders, which were disproportionately impacted by the pandemic.

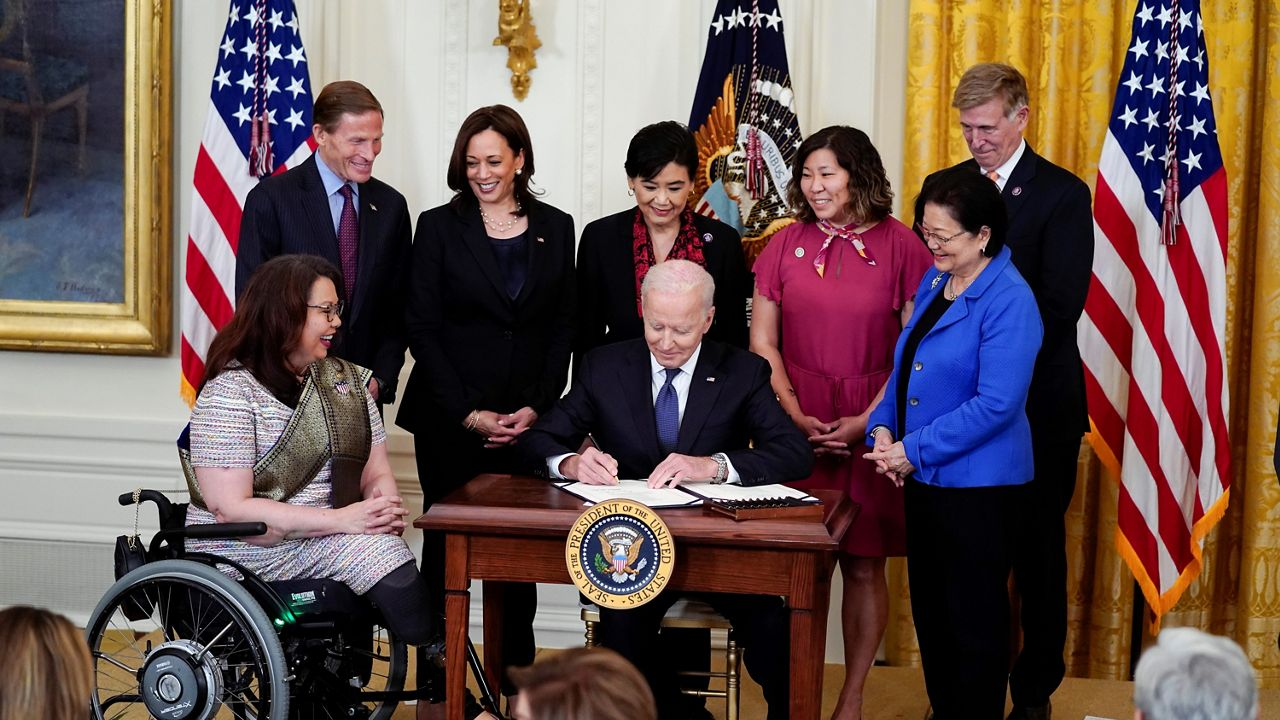
President Joe Biden signs the COVID-19 Hate Crimes Act on May 20, 2021.

==== COVID-19 Hate Crimes Act ====
On May 20, 2021, President Biden signed into law the COVID-19 Hate Crimes Act, which allowed the U.S. Justice Department to review hate crimes related to COVID-19 and establish an online database. The Act makes hate-crime reporting more accessible at the state and local levels by increasing language accessibility to reporting resources and authorizes grants to state and local governments for crime-reduction programs to prevent and respond to hate crimes. The Act was signed into law in the context of a 189% surge in anti-Asian hate crimes from 2020 to 2021 during the COVID-19 pandemic.

=== Second Trump Administration ===
On January 20, 2025, President Donald Trump issued Initial Rescissions of Harmful Executive Orders Executive Order 14148, shuttering the White House Initiative on Asian Americans, Native Hawaiians, and Pacific Islanders (WHIAANHPI) and the President's Advisory Commission on Asian Americans, Native Hawaiians, and Pacific Islanders (PACAANHPI)

== Publications ==
In September 2011, the Initiative produced a Guide to Federal Agency Resources.

In May 2014, the Initiative published the Report from the President's Advisory Commission on Asian Americans and Pacific Islanders titled "Building the American Mosaic." The report communicates the current role of commissioners and also offers recommendations to federal departments and agencies in building a stronger federal infrastructure for AAPIs.

The FY 2016-2017 federal Agency Plans incorporating a strategic outline for addressing AAPI needs are publicly available on the Initiative website.

The Initiative also highlights the yearly progress federal departments and agencies have made in attaining agency plan benchmarks and goals. It has also released a report of its own accomplishments over the past four years.

In May 2021, the Initiative compiled several resources for AAPI and NH communities on its website.

In January 2025, the Initiative published "Rising Together," its final report to the President outlining the impacts of the Initiative's work and updates from 29 federal agencies. The report also included the President's Advisory Commission's final report, "Amplify Our Voice to Advance Equity Now," which contains 86 recommendations.
