= Ethan Small =

American baseball player (born 1997)

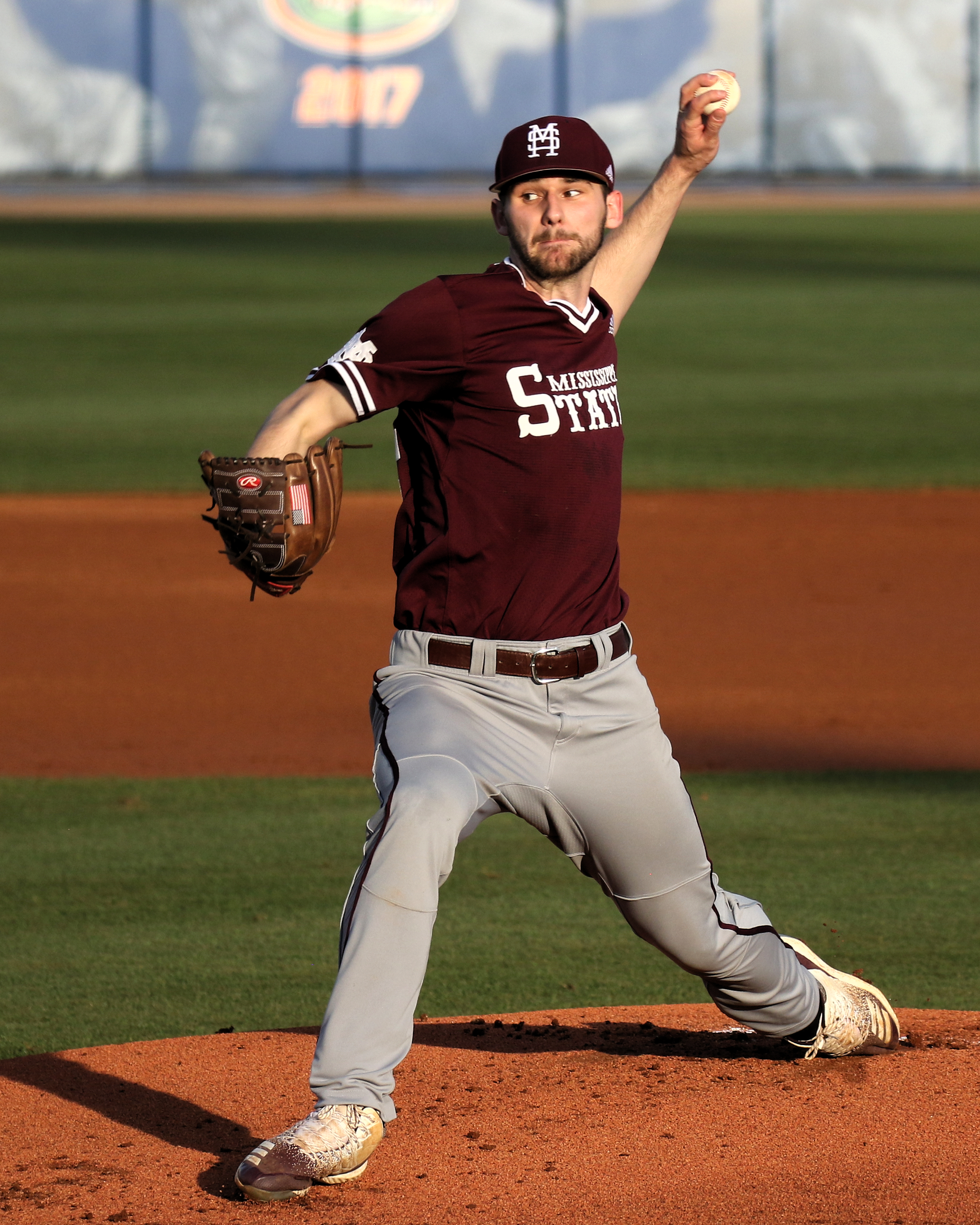
- Small playing with the Mississippi State Bulldogs

Free agent
- Pitcher
- Born: February 14, 1997 (age 29); Jackson, Tennessee, U.S.
- Bats: Left Throws: Left

MLB debut
- May 30, 2022, for the Milwaukee Brewers

MLB statistics (through 2023 season)
- Win–loss record: 0–0
- Earned run average: 8.71
- Strikeouts: 13
- Stats at Baseball Reference

Teams
- Milwaukee Brewers (2022–2023)

Career highlights and awards
- National Pitcher of the Year Award (2019)

Ethan Robert Small (born February 14, 1997) is an American professional baseball pitcher who is a free agent. He has previously played in Major League Baseball (MLB) for the Milwaukee Brewers.

== Amateur career ==
Small attended Lexington High School in Lexington, Tennessee. He was not drafted out of high school in the 2015 Major League Baseball draft, thus enrolling at Mississippi State University.

As a freshman at Mississippi State in 2016, Small pitched only ten innings. After the season, he played collegiate summer baseball with the Wareham Gatemen of the Cape Cod Baseball League. After his freshman campaign, he underwent Tommy John surgery and missed all of 2017. He returned as a redshirt sophomore in 2018, starting 18 games, going 5–4 with a 3.20 earned run average (ERA). In 2019, Small went 10–2 with a 1.93 ERA in 18 starts, striking out 176 batters in 107 innings, and was named the SEC Pitcher of the Year. He won the 2019 National Pitcher of the Year Award.

== Professional career ==
=== Milwaukee Brewers ===
The Milwaukee Brewers selected Small in the first round, with the 28th overall selection, of the 2019 Major League Baseball draft. He signed for $1.8 million. He made his professional debut with the Arizona League Brewers, and, after two games, was promoted to the Wisconsin Timber Rattlers. Over seven starts between the two teams, he went 0–2 with a 0.86 ERA, striking out 36 over 21 innings. He did not play a minor league game in 2020 due to the cancellation of the season.

Small began the 2021 season with the Biloxi Shuckers and was promoted to the Nashville Sounds during the season. That June, he was selected to play in the All-Star Futures Game. Over 18 starts in 2021, Small went 4–2 with a 1.98 ERA and 92 strikeouts over 77 1/3 innings.

Small was assigned to Triple-A Nashville to begin the 2022 season. On May 30, 2022, Small was selected to the 40-man roster and promoted to the major leagues for the first time to make a spot start against the Chicago Cubs.

Small was optioned to Triple-A Nashville to begin the 2023 season. He made two major league appearances for Milwaukee on the year, struggling to an 11.25 ERA with 6 strikeouts across 4.0 innings of work. On February 1, 2024, Small was designated for assignment by the Brewers.

=== San Francisco Giants ===
On February 5, 2024, the Brewers traded Small to the San Francisco Giants in exchange for cash considerations. He was placed on the 60–day injured list to begin the season after suffering a moderate right oblique strain. Small was activated from the injured list on August 16 and was subsequently optioned to the Triple–A Sacramento River Cats. On November 22, the Giants non–tendered Small, making him a free agent.

On December 5, 2024, Small re–signed with the Giants organization on a minor league contract. He made seven appearances for Sacramento in 2025, struggling to a 7.11 ERA with six strikeouts across 6 1/3 innings pitched. Small elected free agency following the season on November 6, 2025.

== Pitching style ==
Small features a lively low- to mid-90 mph fastball—scouts often described it as a "rising" fastball—a curveball and changeup. He has been known to vary his windup timing on his pitches, to give him an advantage over hitters, similar to pitchers such as Marcus Stroman and Johnny Cueto.
