= Bryson Fonville =

American professional basketball player

Free agent
- Position: Point guard

Personal information
- Born: May 26, 1994 (age 32)
- Listed height: 6 ft 0 in (1.83 m)
- Listed weight: 180 lb (82 kg)

Career information
- High school: Walter H. Page (Greensboro, North Carolina)
- College: Catholic (2012–2016)
- NBA draft: 2016: undrafted
- Playing career: 2016–present

Career history
- 2016–2018: Texas Legends

Bryson Fonville (born May 26, 1994) is an American professional basketball player who last played for the Texas Legends of the NBA G League. He played college basketball for the Catholic University Cardinals. He was drafted as the ninth pick of the fifth round of the 2016 D-League draft.

== Early life ==
Fonville, the son of Kim and Tracie Fonville, is from Greensboro, North Carolina. He has an older sister.

He attended Walter Hines Page Senior High School where he was a three-year starter on the basketball team. During his senior year, he averaged 13 points, 7 assists and 2 steals a game, and he reached the Regional Final of the state tournament. He was a first Team All-Conference selection and helped his team with the conference champions as a junior and senior. Fonville was also a member of National Honor Society.

As a player in the Amateur Athletic Union league, Fonville played for the Greensboro Warriors and Greensboro Galaxy. With the Warriors Fonville placed eighth at nationals. During high school he was 5'11 and weighed 160 pounds, and had offers to attend NCAA Division II colleges.

== College career ==
Fonville is one of the most decorated men's basketball players in the history of The Catholic University of America. He started in every game except for one in the 2014–2015 season. As a four-year starter he scored 1,649 career points, placing him in the top-10 in University history. His total steals also places him in the top-four. He competed in the NCAA Tournament three times.

As a student, he majored in business management.

=== Senior year ===
During his senior year he led the team to the Landmark Conference Championship after starting all 29 games of the season where he averaged 34.8 minutes per game. Fonville led the team with 178 shots made from the field, shooting 43.3% on the season. He had a total of 486 points on that season, averaging 16.8 points per game. Shooting from the free throw line, he sank 78% of his shots and hit and 32.1% from the 3-pt line.

Fonville had 34 offensive and 92 defensive rebounds that season, leading the team with 155 assists and 52 steals. During the game against Alvernia University in the Division III NCAA tournament, he led team with career high 38 points.

=== Honors and awards ===
Fonville was named an All-American by several media outlets in 2015 and 2016 and was the 2015 Landmark Conference Player of the Year. He was twice names a Landmark Champion and was a three-time regular season champion. In 2015, the CUA Athletic Department named him Outstanding Senior Student-Athlete.

He was named NABC third-team All-American, a D3Hoops.com fourth-team All-American, a DIII News fourth-team All-American, and an ECAC Division III South All-Star first team. In addition, Fonville earned a spot on the Middle Atlantic All-District first team, the D3Hoops.com All-Middle Atlantic Region first team, the first-team All-Landmark Conference, and was the Most Valuable Player of the CUA-Holiday Inn College Park Classic.

== Professional career ==
On October 30, 2016, Fonville was drafted as the ninth pick of the fifth round of the NBA Development League 2016 draft by the Texas Legends.
