= 2026 Southeastern Conference baseball tournament =

2026 baseball tournament

- Teams: 16
- Format: Double bye single elimination
- Finals site: Hoover Metropolitan Stadium; Hoover, AL
- Champions: Georgia (1st title)
- Winning coach: Wes Johnson (1st title)
- MVP: Daniel Jackson (Georgia)
- Attendance: 162,016
- Television: SEC Network, ABC

2026 Southeastern Conference baseball standings
	Conf.				Overall
Team	W		L	PCT	W		L	PCT
No. 3 Georgia ‍†‍‡‍^{y}	23	–	7	.767	46	–	12	.793
No. 6 Texas ‍‍‍^{y}	19	–	10	.655	40	–	13	.755
No. 11 Texas A&M ‍‍‍^{y}	18	–	11	.621	39	–	14	.736
No. 16 Alabama ‍‍‍^{y}	18	–	12	.600	37	–	19	.661
No. 10 Florida ‍‍‍^{y}	18	–	12	.600	39	–	19	.672
No. 5 Auburn ‍‍‍^{y}	17	–	13	.567	38	–	19	.667
No. 14 Arkansas ‍‍‍^{y}	17	–	13	.567	39	–	20	.661
No. 17 Mississippi State ‍‍‍^{y}	16	–	14	.533	40	–	17	.702
No. 18 Ole Miss ‍‍‍^{y}	15	–	15	.500	36	–	21	.632
No. 23 Tennessee ‍‍‍^{y}	15	–	15	.500	38	–	20	.655
Oklahoma ‍‍‍^{y}	14	–	16	.467	32	–	21	.604
Vanderbilt ‍‍‍	14	–	16	.467	33	–	25	.569
Kentucky ‍‍‍^{y}	13	–	17	.433	31	–	21	.596
LSU ‍‍‍	9	–	21	.300	30	–	28	.517
South Carolina ‍‍‍	7	–	23	.233	22	–	35	.386
Missouri ‍‍‍	6	–	24	.200	24	–	31	.436
† – Conference champion ‡ – Tournament champion y – Invited to the NCAA Tournament; As of May 24, 2026; Rankings from D1Baseball

The 2026 Southeastern Conference baseball tournament was the postseason baseball tournament for the Southeastern Conference for the 2026 NCAA Division I baseball season. The tournament was held from May 19–24 at Hoover Metropolitan Stadium in Hoover, Alabama. The tournament champion, Georgia, earned the conference's automatic bid to the 2026 NCAA Division I baseball tournament

This was the twenty-seventh consecutive year and twenty-ninth overall that the event was held at Hoover Metropolitan Stadium.

== Format and seeding ==
All 16 members of the SEC have or will participate in the event. Teams will be seeded based on conference record. The top 4 seeds will earn a double-bye to the quarterfinals, and seeds 5–8 will earn a bye to the second round. The tournament will be conducted in a single-elimination format. This is the second year of this format.

Seed	School	W–L	Pct	GB No. 1	Tiebeaker
1	Georgia	23–7	.767	–	
2	Texas	19–10	.655	3.5	
3	Texas A&M	18–11	.621	4.5	
4	Alabama	18–12	.600	5	3–0 vs. Florida
5	Florida	18–12	.600	5	0–3 vs. Alabama
6	Auburn	17–13	.567	6	2–1 vs. Arkansas
7	Arkansas	17–13	.567	6	1–2 vs. Auburn
8	Mississippi State	16–14	.533	7	
9	Ole Miss	15–15	.500	8	2–1 vs. Tennessee
10	Tennessee	15–15	.500	8	1–2 vs. Ole Miss
11	Oklahoma	14–16	.467	9	2–1 vs. Vanderbilt
12	Vanderbilt	14–16	.467	9	1–2 vs. Oklahoma
13	Kentucky	13–17	.433	10	
14	LSU	9–21	.300	14	
15	South Carolina	7–23	.233	16	
16	Missouri	6–24	.200	17	

For the first time at the college level, the Automated Ball-Strike System (ABS) will be in use for all games in the tournament. Each team will begin the game with three challenges, and challenges may be requested by the pitcher, catcher, or batter.

== Bracket ==
First round May 19; SEC Network
9	Ole Miss	8
16	Missouri	10
12	Vanderbilt	8
13	Kentucky	5
10	Tennessee	11
15	South Carolina	6
11	Oklahoma	2
14	LSU	6

Second round May 20; SEC Network
8	Mississippi State	12^{7}
16	Missouri	2
5	Florida	8
12	Vanderbilt	3
7	Arkansas	8
10	Tennessee	4
6	Auburn	3
14	LSU	1

Quarterfinals; May 21 & 22; SEC Network
1	Georgia	5
8	Mississippi State	3
4	Alabama	3
5	Florida	13^{8}
2	Texas	1
7	Arkansas	8
3	Texas A&M	0
6	Auburn	7

Semifinals; May 23; SEC Network
1	Georgia	8
5	Florida	7
7	Arkansas	2
6	Auburn	1

Championship; May 24; SEC Network
1	Georgia	11^{7}
7	Arkansas	1

== Schedule ==
Game	Time	Matchup	Score	Television	Attendance
First round – Tuesday, May 19
1	9:30 am	No. 9 Ole Miss vs. No. 16 Missouri	8–10	SECN	6,748
2	2:00 pm	No. 12 Vanderbilt vs. No. 13 Kentucky	8–5	SECN	6,748
3	5:35 pm	No. 10 Tennessee vs. No. 15 South Carolina	11–6	SECN	7,617
4	8:55 pm	No. 11 Oklahoma vs. No. 14 LSU	2–6	SECN	7,617
Second round – Wednesday, May 20
5	9:30 am	No. 8 Mississippi State vs. No. 16 Missouri	12–2^{7}	SECN	8,352
6	12:45 pm	No. 5 Florida vs. No. 12 Vanderbilt	8–3	SECN	8,352
7	4:30 pm	No. 7 Arkansas vs. No. 10 Tennessee	8–4	SECN	14,461
8	8:10 pm	No. 6 Auburn vs. No. 14 LSU	3–1	SECN	14,461
Quarterfinals – Thursday, May 21
9	12:00 pm	No. 1 Georgia vs. No. 8 Mississippi State	5–3	SECN	11,146
10	3:30 pm	No. 4 Alabama vs. No. 5 Florida	3–13^{8}	SECN	11,146
Quarterfinals – Friday, May 22
11	4:30 pm	No. 2 Texas vs. No. 7 Arkansas	1–8	SECN	13,105
12	8:25 pm	No. 3 Texas A&M vs. No. 6 Auburn	0–7	SECN	13,105
Semifinals – Saturday, May 23
13	12:00 pm	No. 1 Georgia vs. No. 5 Florida	8–7	SECN	14,919
14	4:55 pm	No. 7 Arkansas vs. No. 6 Auburn	2–1	SECN	14,919
Championship – Sunday, May 24
15	3:45 pm	No. 1 Georgia vs. No. 7 Arkansas	11–1^{7}	ABC/SECN	9,320
Game times in CT. Rankings denote tournament seeding.

== Game results ==
=== First Round ===
May 19, 2026; 9:30 am CDT (UTC-5); Game 1	No. 16 Missouri	10–8	No. 9 Ole Miss	Hoover Metropolitan Stadium; Attendance: 6,748; Umpires: HP: Jason Bradley; 1B: Kevin Sweeney; 2B: Javerro January; 3B: Jeff Wright
May 19, 2026; 9:30 am CDT (UTC-5); Game 1	WP: Eli Skidmore (3–0)	Box Score	LP: Landon Koenig (3–1)	Hoover Metropolitan Stadium; Attendance: 6,748; Umpires: HP: Jason Bradley; 1B: Kevin Sweeney; 2B: Javerro January; 3B: Jeff Wright
May 19, 2026; 9:30 am CDT (UTC-5); Game 1	HR: Durnin (9), Peer (3), Woita (14)	Box Score	HR: Decker (11), Fawley (14), Federico (5)	Hoover Metropolitan Stadium; Attendance: 6,748; Umpires: HP: Jason Bradley; 1B: Kevin Sweeney; 2B: Javerro January; 3B: Jeff Wright

May 19, 2026; 2:00 pm CDT (UTC-5); Game 2	No. 13 Kentucky	5–8	No. 12 Vanderbilt	Hoover Metropolitan Stadium; Attendance: 6,748; Umpires: HP: Jeff Head; 1B: Clint Fagan; 2B: David Soucy; 3B: Eddie Newsom
May 19, 2026; 2:00 pm CDT (UTC-5); Game 2	LP: Jaxon Jelkin (8–3)	Box Score	WP: Alex Kranzler (3–3)	Hoover Metropolitan Stadium; Attendance: 6,748; Umpires: HP: Jeff Head; 1B: Clint Fagan; 2B: David Soucy; 3B: Eddie Newsom
May 19, 2026; 2:00 pm CDT (UTC-5); Game 2	HR: Bell (8), Hansen (5)	Box Score	HR: Johnstone (11)	Hoover Metropolitan Stadium; Attendance: 6,748; Umpires: HP: Jeff Head; 1B: Clint Fagan; 2B: David Soucy; 3B: Eddie Newsom

May 19, 2026; 5:35 pm CDT (UTC-5); Game 3	No. 15 South Carolina	6–11	No. 10 Tennessee	Hoover Metropolitan Stadium; Attendance: 7,617; Umpires: HP: Eric Goshay; 1B: Jeff Wright; 2B: Derek Mollica; 3B: Javerro January
May 19, 2026; 5:35 pm CDT (UTC-5); Game 3	LP: Brandon Stone (5–5)	Box Score	WP: Cam Appenzeller (6–1); Sv: Will Haas (1)	Hoover Metropolitan Stadium; Attendance: 7,617; Umpires: HP: Eric Goshay; 1B: Jeff Wright; 2B: Derek Mollica; 3B: Javerro January
May 19, 2026; 5:35 pm CDT (UTC-5); Game 3	HR: Evans (9), Craddock (11)	Box Score	HR: Wright (10), Ford (20)	Hoover Metropolitan Stadium; Attendance: 7,617; Umpires: HP: Eric Goshay; 1B: Jeff Wright; 2B: Derek Mollica; 3B: Javerro January

May 19, 2026; 8:55 pm CDT (UTC-5); Game 4	No. 14 LSU	6–2	No. 11 Oklahoma	Hoover Metropolitan Stadium; Attendance: 7,617; Umpires: HP: Scott Kennedy; 1B: David Savage; 2B: Clint Fagan; 3B: David Soucy
May 19, 2026; 8:55 pm CDT (UTC-5); Game 4	WP: Gavin Guidry (5–3); Sv: Deven Sheerin (5)	Box Score	LP: LJ Mercurius (0–2)	Hoover Metropolitan Stadium; Attendance: 7,617; Umpires: HP: Scott Kennedy; 1B: David Savage; 2B: Clint Fagan; 3B: David Soucy
May 19, 2026; 8:55 pm CDT (UTC-5); Game 4	HR: Milam (11)	Box Score		Hoover Metropolitan Stadium; Attendance: 7,617; Umpires: HP: Scott Kennedy; 1B: David Savage; 2B: Clint Fagan; 3B: David Soucy

=== Second Round ===
May 20, 2026; 9:30 am CDT (UTC-5); Game 5	No. 16 Missouri	2–12 (F/7)	No. 8 Mississippi State	Hoover Metropolitan Stadium; Attendance: 8,352; Umpires: HP: Jeff Wright; 1B: Jeff Head; 2B: Eric Goshay; 3B: Derek Mollica
May 20, 2026; 9:30 am CDT (UTC-5); Game 5	LP: Brady Kehlenbrink (3–10)	Box Score	WP: Tomas Valincius (10–2)	Hoover Metropolitan Stadium; Attendance: 8,352; Umpires: HP: Jeff Wright; 1B: Jeff Head; 2B: Eric Goshay; 3B: Derek Mollica
May 20, 2026; 9:30 am CDT (UTC-5); Game 5	HR: Durnin (10)	Box Score	HR: Woodson (7), V. Valincius (6), V. Valincius (7)	Hoover Metropolitan Stadium; Attendance: 8,352; Umpires: HP: Jeff Wright; 1B: Jeff Head; 2B: Eric Goshay; 3B: Derek Mollica

May 20, 2026; 12:45 pm CDT (UTC-5); Game 6	No. 12 Vanderbilt	3–8	No. 5 Florida	Hoover Metropolitan Stadium; Attendance: 8,352; Umpires: HP: Eddie Newsom; 1B: Javerro January; 2B: Scott Kennedy; 3B: Jason Bradley
May 20, 2026; 12:45 pm CDT (UTC-5); Game 6	LP: Brennan Seiber (5–2)	Box Score	WP: Jackson Barberi (4–2)	Hoover Metropolitan Stadium; Attendance: 8,352; Umpires: HP: Eddie Newsom; 1B: Javerro January; 2B: Scott Kennedy; 3B: Jason Bradley
May 20, 2026; 12:45 pm CDT (UTC-5); Game 6		Box Score	HR: Yost (11), Cyr (13), Lawson (16)	Hoover Metropolitan Stadium; Attendance: 8,352; Umpires: HP: Eddie Newsom; 1B: Javerro January; 2B: Scott Kennedy; 3B: Jason Bradley

May 20, 2026; 4:30 pm CDT (UTC-5); Game 7	No. 10 Tennessee	4–8	No. 7 Arkansas	Hoover Metropolitan Stadium; Attendance: 14,461; Umpires: HP: David Savage; 1B: David Soucy; 2B: Jeff Head; 3B: Eric Goshay
May 20, 2026; 4:30 pm CDT (UTC-5); Game 7	LP: Evan Blanco (7–4)	Box Score	WP: Cole Gibler (5–2)	Hoover Metropolitan Stadium; Attendance: 14,461; Umpires: HP: David Savage; 1B: David Soucy; 2B: Jeff Head; 3B: Eric Goshay
May 20, 2026; 4:30 pm CDT (UTC-5); Game 7		Box Score	HR: Kozeal (19), Stewart (14), Stewart (15), Pompey (16)	Hoover Metropolitan Stadium; Attendance: 14,461; Umpires: HP: David Savage; 1B: David Soucy; 2B: Jeff Head; 3B: Eric Goshay

May 20, 2026; 8:10 pm CDT (UTC-5); Game 8	No. 14 LSU	1–3	No. 6 Auburn	Hoover Metropolitan Stadium; Attendance: 14,461; Umpires: HP: Kevin Sweeney; 1B: Scott Kennedy; 2B: Jason Bradley; 3B: Clint Fagan
May 20, 2026; 8:10 pm CDT (UTC-5); Game 8	LP: Casan Evans (2–4)	Box Score	WP: Jake Marciano (5–5); Sv: Jackson Sanders (4)	Hoover Metropolitan Stadium; Attendance: 14,461; Umpires: HP: Kevin Sweeney; 1B: Scott Kennedy; 2B: Jason Bradley; 3B: Clint Fagan
May 20, 2026; 8:10 pm CDT (UTC-5); Game 8		Box Score	HR: Fralick (14), Guevara (12)	Hoover Metropolitan Stadium; Attendance: 14,461; Umpires: HP: Kevin Sweeney; 1B: Scott Kennedy; 2B: Jason Bradley; 3B: Clint Fagan

=== Quarterfinals ===
May 21, 2026; 12:00 pm CDT (UTC-5); Game 9	No. 8 Mississippi State	3–5	No. 1 Georgia	Hoover Metropolitan Stadium; Attendance: 11,146; Umpires: HP: Derek Mollica; 1B: Eddie Newsom; 2B: Jeff Wright; 3B: Jeff Head
May 21, 2026; 12:00 pm CDT (UTC-5); Game 9	LP: Duke Stone (6–3)	Box Score	WP: Joey Volchko (9–2); Sv: Matt Scott (5)	Hoover Metropolitan Stadium; Attendance: 11,146; Umpires: HP: Derek Mollica; 1B: Eddie Newsom; 2B: Jeff Wright; 3B: Jeff Head
May 21, 2026; 12:00 pm CDT (UTC-5); Game 9	HR: Sullivan (13)	Box Score	HR: Hudson (18)	Hoover Metropolitan Stadium; Attendance: 11,146; Umpires: HP: Derek Mollica; 1B: Eddie Newsom; 2B: Jeff Wright; 3B: Jeff Head

May 21, 2026; 3:30 pm CDT (UTC-5); Game 10	No. 5 Florida	13–3 (F/8)	No. 4 Alabama	Hoover Metropolitan Stadium; Attendance: 11,146; Umpires: HP: Clint Fagan; 1B: Eric Goshay; 2B: David Savage; 3B: Kevin Sweeney
May 21, 2026; 3:30 pm CDT (UTC-5); Game 10	WP: Liam Peterson (3–5)	Box Score	LP: Tyler Fay (9–4)	Hoover Metropolitan Stadium; Attendance: 11,146; Umpires: HP: Clint Fagan; 1B: Eric Goshay; 2B: David Savage; 3B: Kevin Sweeney
May 21, 2026; 3:30 pm CDT (UTC-5); Game 10	HR: Lawson (16), Surowiec (11)	Box Score	HR: Neal (8)	Hoover Metropolitan Stadium; Attendance: 11,146; Umpires: HP: Clint Fagan; 1B: Eric Goshay; 2B: David Savage; 3B: Kevin Sweeney

May 22, 2026; 4:30 pm CDT (UTC-5); Game 11	No. 7 Arkansas	8–1	No. 2 Texas	Hoover Metropolitan Stadium; Attendance: 13,105; Umpires: HP: David Soucy; 1B: Jason Bradley; 2B: Eddie Newsom; 3B: Scott Kennedy
May 22, 2026; 4:30 pm CDT (UTC-5); Game 11	WP: Gabe Gaeckle (4–3)	Box Score	LP: Cody Howard (0–1)	Hoover Metropolitan Stadium; Attendance: 13,105; Umpires: HP: David Soucy; 1B: Jason Bradley; 2B: Eddie Newsom; 3B: Scott Kennedy
May 22, 2026; 4:30 pm CDT (UTC-5); Game 11	HR: Kozeal (19), Kozeal (20)	Box Score		Hoover Metropolitan Stadium; Attendance: 13,105; Umpires: HP: David Soucy; 1B: Jason Bradley; 2B: Eddie Newsom; 3B: Scott Kennedy

May 22, 2026; 8:25 pm CDT (UTC-5); Game 12	No. 6 Auburn	7–0	No. 3 Texas A&M	Hoover Metropolitan Stadium; Attendance: 13,105; Umpires: HP: Javerro January; 1B: Derek Mollica; 2B: Kevin Sweeney; 3B: David Savage
May 22, 2026; 8:25 pm CDT (UTC-5); Game 12	WP: Andreas Alvarez (9–3); Sv: LJ Cormier (2)	Box Score	LP: Ethan Darden (4–3)	Hoover Metropolitan Stadium; Attendance: 13,105; Umpires: HP: Javerro January; 1B: Derek Mollica; 2B: Kevin Sweeney; 3B: David Savage
May 22, 2026; 8:25 pm CDT (UTC-5); Game 12	HR: M. McCraine (7), Bingaman (12)	Box Score		Hoover Metropolitan Stadium; Attendance: 13,105; Umpires: HP: Javerro January; 1B: Derek Mollica; 2B: Kevin Sweeney; 3B: David Savage

=== Semifinals ===
May 23, 2026; 12:00 pm CDT (UTC-5); Game 13	No. 5 Florida	7–8	No. 1 Georgia	Hoover Metropolitan Stadium; Attendance: 14,919; Umpires: HP: Kevin Sweeney; 1B: Eddie Newsom; 2B: Eric Goshay; 3B: Jeff Head; LF: Scott Kennedy; RF: David Soucy
May 23, 2026; 12:00 pm CDT (UTC-5); Game 13	LP: Joshua Whritenour (3–4)	Box Score	WP: Justin Byrd (4–2)	Hoover Metropolitan Stadium; Attendance: 14,919; Umpires: HP: Kevin Sweeney; 1B: Eddie Newsom; 2B: Eric Goshay; 3B: Jeff Head; LF: Scott Kennedy; RF: David Soucy
May 23, 2026; 12:00 pm CDT (UTC-5); Game 13	HR: Cyr (14), McDonald (7)	Box Score		Hoover Metropolitan Stadium; Attendance: 14,919; Umpires: HP: Kevin Sweeney; 1B: Eddie Newsom; 2B: Eric Goshay; 3B: Jeff Head; LF: Scott Kennedy; RF: David Soucy

May 23, 2026; 4:55 pm CDT (UTC-5); Game 14	No. 7 Arkansas	2–1	No. 6 Auburn	Hoover Metropolitan Stadium; Attendance: 14,919; Umpires: HP: Jason Bradley; 1B: Clint Fagan; 2B: Derek Mollica; 3B: Javerro January; LF: Eddie Newsom; RF: David Savage
May 23, 2026; 4:55 pm CDT (UTC-5); Game 14	WP: Ethan McElvain (6–0)	Box Score	LP: Ryan Hetzler (4–2)	Hoover Metropolitan Stadium; Attendance: 14,919; Umpires: HP: Jason Bradley; 1B: Clint Fagan; 2B: Derek Mollica; 3B: Javerro January; LF: Eddie Newsom; RF: David Savage
May 23, 2026; 4:55 pm CDT (UTC-5); Game 14	HR: Helfrick (17)	Box Score	HR: Terrell (17)	Hoover Metropolitan Stadium; Attendance: 14,919; Umpires: HP: Jason Bradley; 1B: Clint Fagan; 2B: Derek Mollica; 3B: Javerro January; LF: Eddie Newsom; RF: David Savage

=== Championship ===
May 24, 2026; 3:45 pm CDT (UTC-5); Game 15	No. 7 Arkansas	1–11 (F/7)	No. 1 Georgia	Hoover Metropolitan Stadium; Attendance: 9,320; Umpires: HP: Derek Mollica; 1B: Kevin Sweeney; 2B: Clint Fagan; 3B: Jason Bradley; LF: Jeff Head; RF: Javerro January
May 24, 2026; 3:45 pm CDT (UTC-5); Game 15	LP: Tate McGuire (1–1)	Box Score	WP: Paul Farley (8–1)	Hoover Metropolitan Stadium; Attendance: 9,320; Umpires: HP: Derek Mollica; 1B: Kevin Sweeney; 2B: Clint Fagan; 3B: Jason Bradley; LF: Jeff Head; RF: Javerro January
May 24, 2026; 3:45 pm CDT (UTC-5); Game 15	HR: Niu (10)	Box Score	HR: Arcamone (4)	Hoover Metropolitan Stadium; Attendance: 9,320; Umpires: HP: Derek Mollica; 1B: Kevin Sweeney; 2B: Clint Fagan; 3B: Jason Bradley; LF: Jeff Head; RF: Javerro January

== All–Tournament Team ==
Position	Player	Team
P	Gabe Gaeckle	Arkansas
P	Andreas Alvarez	Auburn
C	**Daniel Jackson**	Georgia
DH	Noah Sullivan	Mississippi State
1B	Brennan Hudson	Georgia
2B	Chris Rembert	Auburn
3B	Ethan Surowiec	Florida
SS	Camden Kozeal	Arkansas
OF	Blake Cyr	Florida
OF	Kenny Ishikawa	Georgia
OF	Rylan Lujo	Georgia

MVP in bold Source:
