= 2026 Georgia Bulldogs baseball team =

2026 season of University of Georgia baseball team

2026 Georgia Bulldogs baseball

SEC regular season and tournament champions Athens Regional champions Athens Super Regional champions

College World Series, 2–2
- Conference: Southeastern Conference

Ranking
- Coaches: No. 3
- D1Baseball.com: No. 3
- Record: 53–14 (23–7 SEC)
- Head coach: Wes Johnson (3rd season)
- Assistant coaches: Will Coggin; Nick Ammirati; Brock Bennett
- Home stadium: Foley Field

2026 Southeastern Conference baseball standings
	Conf.				Overall
Team	W		L	PCT	W		L	PCT
No. 3 Georgia ‍†‍‡‍^{y}	23	–	7	.767	53	–	14	.791
No. 5 Texas ‍‍‍^{y}	19	–	10	.655	46	–	15	.754
No. 17 Texas A&M ‍‍‍^{y}	18	–	11	.621	41	–	16	.719
No. 6 Alabama ‍‍‍^{y}	18	–	12	.600	42	–	21	.667
No. 16 Florida ‍‍‍^{y}	18	–	12	.600	41	–	21	.661
No. 9 Auburn ‍‍‍^{y}	17	–	13	.567	42	–	22	.656
No. 23 Arkansas ‍‍‍^{y}	17	–	13	.567	41	–	22	.651
No. 14 Mississippi State ‍‍‍^{y}	16	–	14	.533	43	–	19	.694
No. 7 Ole Miss ‍‍‍^{y}	15	–	15	.500	41	–	23	.641
Tennessee ‍‍‍^{y}	15	–	15	.500	38	–	22	.633
No. 1 Oklahoma ‍‍‍^{y}	14	–	16	.467	43	–	23	.652
Vanderbilt ‍‍‍	14	–	16	.467	33	–	25	.569
Kentucky ‍‍‍^{y}	13	–	17	.433	33	–	23	.589
LSU ‍‍‍	9	–	21	.300	30	–	28	.517
South Carolina ‍‍‍	7	–	23	.233	22	–	35	.386
Missouri ‍‍‍	6	–	24	.200	24	–	31	.436
† – Conference champion ‡ – Tournament champion y – Invited to the NCAA Tournament; As of June 22, 2026; Rankings from D1Baseball

The 2026 Georgia Bulldogs baseball team represented the University of Georgia in the 2026 NCAA Division I baseball season. The Bulldogs played their home games for the 60th season at Foley Field as a member of the Southeastern Conference. They were led by head coach Wes Johnson, in his third year as head coach.

The Bulldogs featured one of the nation's most productive offenses, led by junior catcher Daniel Jackson, the SEC Player of the Year, who helped the team establish a school record for home runs in a season. Following a 13–8 victory over LSU on May 9, Georgia clinched the Southeastern Conference regular-season championship, securing the program's first SEC title since 2008 and the No. 1 seed in the SEC Tournament. In the SEC Tournament, the Bulldogs defeated Mississippi State, Florida, and Arkansas to win the program's first SEC Tournament championship. Selected as the No. 3 overall national seed in the NCAA tournament, Georgia hosted the Athens Regional and defeated LIU and Liberty twice to advance to the Athens Super Regional against Mississippi State. The Bulldogs then swept Mississippi State in a high-scoring two-game series, securing the program's first appearance in the College World Series since 2008.

== Previous season ==
The Bulldogs finished 43–17, 18–12 in the SEC to finish in fifth place. They were invited to play in the 2025 NCAA Division I baseball tournament, where they hosted the Athens Regional. The Bulldogs defeated Binghamton, before losing two straight games to Duke and Oklahoma State, ending their season.

== Personnel ==
=== Roster ===
2026 Georgia Bulldogs roster
Pitchers: 5 - Justin Byrd - (redshirt) Junior; 6 - Jordan Stephens - Junior; 10 - Matt Scott - Senior; 12 - Caden Aoki - Graduate; 16 - Zach Brown - Junior; 17 - Teddy Brennan - Graduate; 19 - Andrew Behnke - Graduate; 20 - Joe Nottingham - Freshman; 25 - Dylan Wood - Freshman; 27 - Dylan Vigue - Junior; 32 - Grant Edwards - Graduate; 33 - Jackson Peavy - Freshman; 34 - Caleb Jameson - (redshirt) Junior; 35 - Paul Farley - (redshirt) Sophomore; 37 - Joey Volchko- Junior; 42 - Brad Pruett - Junior; 43 - Luke Wiltrakis - (redshirt) Sophomore; 45 - Bradley Stewart - (redshirt) Sophomore; 46 - Logan Spivey - (redshirt) Junior; 47 - Thomas Ellisen - Graduate; 51 - Lucas Morici - Senior; 65 - Mason Kosowick - Graduate	Catchers: 3 - Daniel Jackson - Junior; 7 - Jack Arcamone - Junior; Infielders: 0 - Ryan Wynn - Junior; 1 - Tre Phelps - Junior; 2 - Ryan Black - Senior; 4 - Michael O'Shaughnessy - Senior; 8 - Rylan Lujo - Sophomore; 9 - Kolby Branch - Senior; 18 - TL Saxon - (redshirt) Junior; 50 - Alexander Sifford - (redshirt) Freshman	Outfielders: 13 - Scott Newman - (redshirt) Junior; 15 - Ty Peeples - Freshman; 23 - Cole Johnson - Freshman; 44 - Cole Koniarsky - Graduate; Utility: 11 - Bryce Calloway (1B/RHP) - Graduate; 14 - Kenny Ishikawa (LHP/OF) - Sophomore; 21 - Jordy Oriach (UTIL) - Senior; 22 - Henry Allen (UTIL) - Sophomore; 28 - Brennan Hudson (C/INF/OF) - Senior

=== Coaching staff ===
2026 Georgia Bulldogs coaching staff
Name	Position	Seasons at Georgia	Alma Mater
Wes Johnson	Head coach	3	Arkansas–Monticello (1994)
Will Coggin	Assistant coach	3	Mississippi State (2008)
Nick Ammirati	Assistant coach	2	Mississippi State (2013)
Brock Bennett	Assistant coach	3	Alabama (2011)

== Schedule and results ==
2026 Georgia Bulldogs baseball game log (53–14)
Regular Season (43–12)

February (9–2)
Date	Opponent	Rank	Site/Stadium	Score	Win	Loss	Save	TV	Attendance	Overall Record	SEC Record
February 13	Wright State	No. 15	Foley Field; Athens, GA	**W** 13–1^{7}	**Volchko (1–0)**	Allen (0–1)	**Aoki (1)**	SECN+	3,633	1–0	–
February 14	Wright State	No. 15	Foley Field	**W** 9–0	**Ishikawa (1–0)**	Paige (0–1)	None	SECN+	3,633	2–0	–
February 14	Wright State	No. 15	Foley Field	**L** 3–6	Lax (1–0)	**Vigue (0–1)**	Paplanus (1)	SECN+	3,172	2–1	–
February 18	USC Upstate	No. 14	Foley Field	**W** 12–6	**Brown (1–0)**	Eichenberger (0–1)	**Farley (1)**	SECN+	1,485	3–1	–
February 20	Samford	No. 14	Foley Field	**W** 11–1^{7}	**Volchko (2–0)**	Blasche (0–1)	None	SECN+	1,904	4–1	–
February 21	Samford	No. 14	Foley Field	**W** 12–4	**Scott (1–0)**	Fredette (0–2)	None	SECN+	2,684	5–1	–
February 22	Samford	No. 14	Foley Field	**W** 22–0^{7}	**Vigue (1–1)**	Marble (1–1)	None	SECN+	1,686	6–1	–
February 25	Troy	No. 11	Foley Field	**L** 5–6^{12}	Dill (1–0)	**Pruett (0–1)**	None	SECN+	985	6–2	–
February 27	Oakland	No. 11	Foley Field	**W** 16–6^{7}	**Volchko (3–0)**	Dahlof (0–2)	None	SECN+	1,298	7–2	–
February 28	Oakland	No. 11	Foley Field	**W** 17–0^{7}	**Aoki (1–0)**	Hansen (0–1)	None	SECN+	3,633	8–2	–
February 28	Oakland	No. 11	Foley Field	**W** 11–0^{7}	**Brown (2–0)**	Ware (0–1)	None	SECN+	3,633	9–2	–

March (15–4)
Date	Opponent	Rank	Site/Stadium	Score	Win	Loss	Save	TV	Attendance	Overall Record	SEC Record
March 1	Oakland	No. 11	Foley Field	**W** 4–3	**Vigue (2–1)**	Green (0–1)	**Byrd (1)**	SECN+	2,029	10–2	–
March 3	at Kennesaw State	No. 11	Mickey Dunn Stadium; Kennesaw, GA	**W** 11–1^{8}	**Farley (1–0)**	Brock (0–1)	None	ESPN+	1,864	11–2	–
March 4	Western Carolina	No. 11	Foley Field	**L** 9–10	Kimbrell (1–0)	**Ellisen** (0–1)	None	SECN+	1,155	11–3	–
March 6	Queens	No. 11	Foley Field	**W** 12–2^{8}	**Volchko** (4–0)	Jones (0–1)	None	SECN+	1,292	12–3	–
March 7	Queens	No. 11	Foley Field	**W** 13–5	**Aoki** (2–0)	Ruller (0–3)	None	SECN+	2,520	13–3	–
March 7	Queens	No. 11	Foley Field	**W** 11–0^{7}	**Vigue** (3–1)	Eagen (1–2)	None	SECN+	2,520	14–3	–
March 8	Queens	No. 11	Foley Field	**W** 13–3^{7}	**Scott** (2–0)	Gowen (0–3)	None	SECN+	1,439	15–3	–
March 13	No. 19 Tennessee	No. 8	Foley Field	**L** 4–7	Arvidson (1–0)	**Byrd** (0–1)	None	SECN+	3,107	15–4	0–1
March 14	No. 19 Tennessee	No. 8	Foley Field	**W** 4–2	**Farley** (2–0)	Mack (3–2)	**Aoki** (2)	SECN	3,330	16–4	1–1
March 15	No. 19 Tennessee	No. 8	Foley Field	**W** 8–7	**Scott** (3–0)	Krenzel (0–1)	**Byrd** (2)	SECN+	3,039	17–4	2–1
March 17	The Citadel	No. 7	Foley Field	**W** 8–5	**Jameson** (1–0)	Davis (0–1)	None	SECN+	1,037	18–4	–
March 20	at No. 23 Texas A&M	No. 7	Blue Bell Park; College Station, TX	**W** 9–4	**Byrd** (1–1)	Sdao (3–1)	None	SECN+	7,870	19–4	3–1
March 21	at No. 23 Texas A&M	No. 7	Blue Bell Park	**W** 8–2	**Scott** (4–0)	Moss (3–2)	None	SECN+	6,925	20–4	4–1
March 22	at No. 23 Texas A&M	No. 7	Blue Bell Park	**L** 5–18^{7}	Sims (4–0)	**Ishikawa** (1–1)	None	SECN	6,087	20–5	4–2
March 24	Kennesaw State	No. 7	Foley Field	**L** 7–10	Bayer (3–2)	**Ellisen** (0–2)	Cain (2)	SECN+	1,381	20–6	–
March 27	South Carolina	No. 7	Foley Field	**W** 5–2	**Volchko (5–0)**	Gunther (2–2)	**Byrd** (3)	SECN+	3,438	21–6	5–2
March 28	South Carolina	No. 7	Foley Field	**W** 3–1	**Scott** (5–0)	Phillips (2–3)	None	SECN+	3,285	22–6	6–2
March 29	South Carolina	No. 7	Foley Field	**W** 9–7	**Byrd** (2–1)	Philpott (0–2)	None	SECN+	3,131	23–6	7–2
March 31	Georgia State	No. 5	Foley Field	**W** 14–9	**Ellisen** (1–2)	Caruso (3–4)	None	SECN+	1,570	24–6	–

April (11–5)
Date	Opponent	Rank	Site/Stadium	Score	Win	Loss	Save	TV	Attendance	Overall Record	SEC Record
April 2	at No. 4 Mississippi State	No. 5	Dudy Noble Field; Starkville, MS	**W** 10–9	**Volchko** (6–0)	Foster (0–1)	**Aoki** (3)	SECN+	12,828	25–6	8–2
April 3	at No. 4 Mississippi State	No. 5	Dudy Noble Field	**W** 3–1	**Farley** (3–0)	Valincius (6–1)	**Scott** (1)	SECN+	14,348	26–6	9–2
April 4	at No. 4 Mississippi State	No. 5	Dudy Noble Field	**W** 8–5^{10}	**Aoki** (3–0)	Webb (0–1)	None	SECN+	10,256	27–6	10–2
April 7	Presbyterian	No. 4	Foley Field	**W** 28–3^{7}	**Jameson** (2–0)	Hampton (2–3)	None	SECN+	3,633	28–6	–
April 10	Florida	No. 4	Foley Field	**L** 2–8	King (5–2)	**Volchko** (6–1)	None	SECN+	3,633	28–7	10–3
April 11	Florida	No. 4	Foley Field	**W** 5–1	**Aoki** (4–0)	Walls (3–2)	None	ESPN2	3,633	29–7	11–3
April 12	Florida	No. 4	Foley Field	**L** 7–13	McNeillie (3–0)	**Edwards** (0–1)	None	SECN	3,232	29–8	11–4
April 14	ETSU	No. 5	Foley Field	**W** 12–10	**Farley** (4–0)	McCarley (0–2)	**Scott** (2)	SECN+	2,817	30–8	–
April 16	at No. 16 Arkansas	No. 5	Baum–Walker Stadium; Fayetteville, AR	**L** 3–6	Dietz (4–2)	**Volchko** (6–2)	McElvain (3)	ESPNU	10,320	30–9	11–5
April 17	at No. 16 Arkansas	No. 5	Baum–Walker Stadium	**W** 5–3	**Aoki** (5–0)	Gibler (3–1)	**Byrd** (3)	SECN+	10,593	31–9	12–5
April 18	at No. 16 Arkansas	No. 5	Baum–Walker Stadium	**W** 26–14	**Scott** (6–0)	Fisher (4–5)	None	SECN+	10,784	32–9	13–5
April 21	vs. No. 3 Georgia Tech	No. 5	Truist Park; Cumberland, GA	**L** 4–14^{7}	Ballard (5–0)	**Farley** (4–1)	None	None	20,000	32–10	–
April 25	at No. 17 Ole Miss	No. 5	Swayze Field; Oxford, MS	**L** 8–10	Koenig (3–0)	**Byrd** (2–2)	Hooks (5)	SECN	9,709	32–11	13–6
April 25	at No. 17 Ole Miss	No. 5	Swayze Field	**W** 9–7^{14}	**Farley** (5–1)	Calhoun (3–3)	None	SECN+	9,709	33–11	14–6
April 26	at No. 17 Ole Miss	No. 5	Swayze Field	**W** 5–1	**Aoki** (6–0)	Rabe (3–3)	**Byrd** (5)	SECN+	8,956	34–11	15–6
April 28	Troy	No. 5	Foley Field	**W** 11–1^{7}	**Stephens** (1–0)	Tapper (1–2)	**Nottingham** (1)	SECN+	3,279	35–11	–

May (8–1)
Date	Opponent	Rank	Site/Stadium	Score	Win	Loss	Save	TV	Attendance	Overall Record	SEC Record
May 1	Missouri	No. 5	Foley Field	**W** 4–0	**Volchko** (7–2)	McDevitt (3–5)	**Scott** (3)	SECN+	3,152	36–11	16–6
May 2	Missouri	No. 5	Foley Field	**W** 13–3^{8}	**Vigue** (4–1)	Kehlenbrink (3–8)	**Byrd** (6)	SECN+	3,070	37–11	17–6
May 3	Missouri	No. 5	Foley Field	**W** 14–4^{7}	**Aoki** (7–0)	Gonzalez (3–1)	None	SECN	2,856	38–11	18–6
May 8	LSU	No. 5	Foley Field	**W** 11–8	**Byrd** (3–2)	Sheerin (3–2)	None	SECN+	3,011	39–11	19–6
May 9	LSU	No. 5	Foley Field	**W** 13–8	**Farley** (6–1)	Paz (1–3)	None	SECN	3,633	40–11	20–6
May 10	LSU	No. 5	Foley Field	**W** 12–1^{7}	**Aoki** (8–0)	Evans (2–3)	None	SECN	3,004	41–11	21–6
May 14	at No. 5 Auburn	No. 4	Plainsman Park; Auburn, AL	**W** 2–1	**Volchko** (8–2)	Marciano (4–5)	**Scott** (4)	SECN+	5,438	42–11	22–6
May 15	at No. 5 Auburn	No. 4	Plainsman Park	**W** 9–7	**Farley** (7–1)	Alvarez (8–3)	**Brown** (1)	SECN+	5,566	43–11	23–6
May 16	at No. 5 Auburn	No. 4	Plainsman Park	**L** 4–14^{8}	Petrovic (9–2)	**Aoki** (8–1)	None	SECN+	6,003	43–12	23–7

Postseason (10–2)

SEC Tournament (3–0)
Date	Opponent	Seed	Site/stadium	Score	Win	Loss	Save	TV	Attendance	Overall record	SECT Record
May 21	vs. (8) No. 16 Mississippi State	(1) No. 4	Hoover Metropolitan Stadium; Hoover, AL	**W** 5–3	**Volchko** (9–2)	Stone (6–3)	**Scott** (5)	SECN	11,146	44–12	1–0
May 23	vs. (5) No. 18 Florida	(1) No. 4	Hoover Metropolitan Stadium	**W** 8–7	**Byrd** (4–2)	Whritenour (3–4)	None	SECN	14,919	45–12	2–0
May 24	vs. (7) No. 12 Arkansas	(1) No. 4	Hoover Metropolitan Stadium	**W** 11–1^{7}	**Farley** (8–1)	McGuire (1–1)	None	SECN	9,320	46–12	3–0

NCAA tournament: Athens Regional (3–0)
Date	Opponent	Seed	Site/stadium	Score	Win	Loss	Save	TV	Attendance	Overall record	Regional record
May 29 (Note: Game was suspended due to heavy rain and completed on May 30.)	(4) LIU	(1) No. 3	Foley Field	**W** 18–2	**Volchko** (10–2)	Finarelli (8–3)	None	ESPN+	3,633	47–12	1–0
May 30	(3) Liberty	(1) No. 3	Foley Field	**W** 6–2	**Scott** (7–0)	Zayac (9–1)	**Byrd** (7)	ESPN+	3,633	48–12	2–0
May 31	(3) Liberty	(1) No. 3	Foley Field	**W** 6–1	**Aoki** (9–1)	Harrington (2–2)	**Brown** (2)	ESPN+	3,633	49–12	3–0

NCAA tournament: Athens Super Regional (2–0)
Date	Opponent	Rank	Stadium Site	Score	Win	Loss	Save	TV	Attendance	Overall Record	Super Reg. Record
June 6	(14) No. 17 Mississippi State	(3) No. 3	Foley Field	**W** 13–12	**Edwards** (1–1)	Burns (2–1)	**Byrd** (8)	ESPN	3,633	50–12	1–0
June 7	(14) No. 17 Mississippi State	(3) No. 3	Foley Field	**W** 11–9^{10}	**Byrd** (5–2)	Pitzer (2–3)	None	ESPN	3,633	51–12	2–0

Men's College World Series (2–2)
Date	Opponent	Rank	Stadium Site	Score	Win	Loss	Save	TV	Attendance	Overall Record	CWS Record
June 13	vs. (6) No. 6 Texas	(3) No. 3	Charles Schwab Field Omaha; Omaha, Nebraska	**W** 7–1	**Volchko** (11–2)	Volantis (10–2)	None	ESPN	25,002	52–12	1–0
June 15	vs. Oklahoma	(3) No. 3	Charles Schwab Field Omaha	**L** 3–4	X. Mercurius (1–2)	**Aoki** (9–2)	Cleveland (9)	ESPN	24,455	52–13	1–1
June 16	vs. (6) No. 6 Texas	(3) No. 3	Charles Schwab Field Omaha	**W** 2–0	**Byrd** (6–2)	Harrison (6–4)	None	ESPN	24,324	53–13	2–1
June 17	vs. Oklahoma	(3) No. 3	Charles Schwab Field Omaha	**L** 4–11	Wesloski (2–1)	**Farley** (8–1)	L. Mercurius (4)	ESPN	24,446	53–14	2–2

Legend: = Win = Loss = Canceled
Bold = Georgia team member
Rankings are based on the team's current ranking in the D1Baseball poll.

=== Athens Regional ===
Athens Regional Teams
(1) Georgia Bulldogs	(2) Boston College Eagles	(3) Liberty Flames	(4) LIU Sharks

First Round
**1**	**Georgia**	**18**
4	LIU	2
**3**	**Liberty**	**4**
2	Boston College	3
Lower round 1
4	LIU	4
**2**	**Boston College**	**8**

Semi-Finals
**1**	**Georgia**	**6**
3	Liberty	2
Lower final
**3**	**Liberty**	**8**
2	Boston College	3

Finals
**1**	**Georgia**	**6**	–
3	Liberty	1	–

Athens Regional Round 1
(4) LIU Sharks	vs.	(1) Georgia Bulldogs

May 29, 2026, 5:00 pm (EST) at Foley Field in Athens, Georgia
Team	1	2	3	4	5	6	7	8	9	R	H	E
(4) LIU	0	0	0	0	0	1	0	0	1	**2**	**2**	**1**
**(1) Georgia**	0	0	6	2	5	4	1	0	X	**18**	**20**	**1**
WP: Joey Volchko (10–2) LP: Nicholas Finarelli (8–3); Home runs: LIU: None; UGA: Jack Arcamone (4); Ryan Black (9); Brennan Hudson (18, 19); Daniel Jackson (28); Cole Johnson (2); Rylan Lujo (10); Ryan Wynn (7, 8); Attendance: 3,633

Athens Regional Round 2
(1) Georgia Bulldogs	vs.	(3) Liberty Flames

May 30, 2026, 5:00 pm (EST) at Foley Field in Athens, Georgia
Team	1	2	3	4	5	6	7	8	9	R	H	E
**(1) Georgia**	2	0	2	0	0	1	0	0	1	**6**	**10**	**1**
(3) Liberty	2	0	0	0	0	0	0	0	0	**2**	**3**	**0**
WP: Matt Scott (7–0) LP: Bradley Zayac (9–1) Sv: Justin Byrd (7); Home runs: UGA: Brennan Hudson (20); Kenny Ishikawa (2); Daniel Jackson (29); Rylan Lujo (11); Ryan Wynn (9); LIB: None; Attendance: 3,633

Athens Regional Championship
(3) Liberty Flames	vs.	(1) Georgia Bulldogs

May 31, 2026, 5:00 pm (EST) at Foley Field in Athens, Georgia
Team	1	2	3	4	5	6	7	8	9	R	H	E
(3) Liberty	1	0	0	0	0	0	0	0	0	**1**	**7**	**0**
**(1) Georgia**	0	0	0	0	0	2	0	4	X	**6**	**7**	**0**
WP: Caden Aoki (9–1) LP: Cooper Harrington (2–2) Sv: Zach Brown (2); Home runs: LIB: None; UGA: Michael O'Shaughnessy (18); Tre Phelps (19); Attendance: 3,633

=== Athens Super Regional ===
Athens Super Regional Game 1
(14) Mississippi State Bulldogs	vs.	(3) Georgia Bulldogs

June 6, 2026, 11:00 am (EST) at Foley Field in Athens, Georgia
Team	1	2	3	4	5	6	7	8	9	R	H	E
(14) Mississippi State	0	6	0	1	0	2	1	2	0	**12**	**15**	**0**
**(3) Georgia**	0	0	0	5	4	1	0	3	X	**13**	**16**	**2**
WP: Grant Edwards (1–1) LP: Dane Burns (2–1) Sv: Justin Byrd (8); Home runs: MSU: Gehrig Frei (12); Kevin Milewski (11, 12); Ace Reese (23); Reed Stallman (13); Ryder Woodson (9); UGA: Daniel Jackson (30); Rylan Lujo (12, 13); Michael O'Shaughnessy (19, 20); Attendance: 3,633

Athens Super Regional Game 2
(3) Georgia Bulldogs	vs.	(14) Mississippi State Bulldogs

June 7, 2026, 12:00 pm (EST) at Foley Field in Athens, Georgia
Team	1	2	3	4	5	6	7	8	9	10	R	H	E
**(3) Georgia**	2	2	1	1	1	0	1	0	1	2	**11**	**11**	**3**
(14) Mississippi State	0	2	0	0	0	2	3	2	0	0	**9**	**14**	**2**
WP: Justin Byrd (5–2) LP: Tyler Pitzer (2–3) Sv: None; Home runs: UGA: Kolby Branch (18, 19); Brennan Hudson (21); Daniel Jackson (31); MSU: Kevin Milewski (13); Jacob Parker (17, 18); Ace Reese (24); Noah Sullivan (13); Vytas Valincius (7); Attendance: 3,633

=== Men's College World Series ===
College World Series Double Elimination Round Game 1
(6) Texas Longhorns	vs.	(3) Georgia Bulldogs

June 13, 2026, 8:45 pm (EST) at Charles Schwab Field Omaha in Omaha, Nebraska
Team	1	2	3	4	5	6	7	8	9	R	H	E
(6) Texas	0	0	0	0	1	0	0	0	0	**1**	**4**	**3**
**(3) Georgia**	4	0	0	0	0	0	3	0	X	**7**	**5**	**1**
WP: Joey Volchko (11–2) LP: Dylan Volantis (10–2) Sv: None; Home runs: TEX: None; UGA: Rylan Lujo (14); Attendance: 25,002

College World Series Double Elimination Round Game 2
(3) Georgia Bulldogs	vs.	Oklahoma Sooners

June 15, 2026, 7:00 pm (EST) at Charles Schwab Field Omaha in Omaha, Nebraska
Team	1	2	3	4	5	6	7	8	9	R	H	E
(3) Georgia	0	0	0	1	1	0	0	1	0	**3**	**8**	**1**
**Oklahoma**	3	0	0	1	0	0	0	0	X	**4**	**8**	**0**
WP: Xander Mercurius (1–2) LP: Caden Aoki (9–2) Sv: Jackson Cleveland (9); Home runs: UGA: Brennan Hudson (22); Kenny Ishikawa (3); Daniel Jackson (32); OU: Brendan Brock (13); Jaxon Willits (7); Attendance: 24,445

College World Series Double Elimination Round Game 3
(3) Georgia Bulldogs	vs.	(6) Texas Longhorns

June 16, 2026, 8:00 pm (EST) at Charles Schwab Field Omaha in Omaha, Nebraska
Team	1	2	3	4	5	6	7	8	9	R	H	E
**(3) Georgia**	0	0	0	0	1	0	1	0	0	**2**	**5**	**1**
(6) Texas	0	0	0	0	0	0	0	0	0	**0**	**4**	**1**
WP: Justin Byrd (6–2) LP: Luke Harrison (6–4) Sv: None; Home runs: UGA: None; TEX: None; Attendance: 24,324

College World Series Double Elimination Round Game 4
Oklahoma Sooners	vs.	(3) Georgia Bulldogs

June 17, 2026, 7:00 pm (EST) at Charles Schwab Field Omaha in Omaha, Nebraska
Team	1	2	3	4	5	6	7	8	9	R	H	E
**Oklahoma**	0	0	1	3	0	1	1	3	2	**11**	**15**	**1**
(3) Georgia	0	0	0	0	1	2	0	0	1	**4**	**6**	**0**
WP: Nick Wesloski (2–1) LP: Paul Farley (8–2) Sv: LJ Mercurius (4); Home runs: OU: Jason Walk (5, 6); Trey Gambill (11); Dasan Harris (5, 6); UGA: Kolby Branch (20); Attendance: 24,446

== Record vs. conference opponents ==
Blank are not scheduled. Blue are home games, otherwise away.

2026 SEC baseball records Source: 2026 SEC baseball game results, 2026 SEC baseball schedule
Tm	W–L	ALA	ARK	AUB	FLA	UGA	KEN	LSU	MSU	MIZ	OKL	OMS	SCA	TEN	TEX	TAM	VAN	Tm	SR	SW
ALA	18–12		0–3	3–0	3–0	.	0–3	.	.	.	2–1	2–1	3–0	1–2	1–2	.	3–0	ALA	6–4	4–2
ARK	17–13	3–0		1–2	0–3	1–2	2–1	.	2–1	2–1	2–1	2–1	2–1	.	.	.	.	ARK	7–3	1–1
AUB	17–13	0–3	2–1		2–1	1–2	2–1	.	2–1	3–0	2–1	.	.	.	1–2	2–1	.	AUB	7–3	1–1
FLA	18–12	0–3	3–0	1–2		2–1	2–1	3–0	.	.	2–1	1–2	3–0	.	.	1–2	.	FLA	6–4	3–1
UGA	23–7	.	2–1	2–1	1–2		.	3–0	3–0	3–0	.	2–1	3–0	2–1	.	2–1	.	UGA	9–1	4–0
KEN	13–17	3–0	1–2	1–2	1–2	.		1–2	.	1–2	.	1–2	1–2	2–1	.	.	1–2	KEN	2–8	1–0
LSU	9–21	.	.	.	0–3	0–3	2–1		0–3	.	1–2	0–3	3–0	2–1	.	0–3	1–2	LSU	3–7	1–5
MSU	16–14	.	1–2	1–2	.	0–3	.	3–0		.	.	3–0	3–0	0–3	1–2	1–2	3–0	MSU	4–6	4–2
MIZ	6–24	.	1–2	0–3	.	0–3	2–1	.	.		0–3	.	0–3	1–2	0–3	0–3	2–1	MIZ	2–8	0–6
OKL	14–16	1–2	1–2	1–2	1–2	.	.	2–1	.	3–0		.	.	1–2	0–3	2–1	2–1	OKL	4–6	1–1
OMS	15–15	1–2	1–2	.	2–1	1–2	2–1	3–0	0–3	.	.		.	2–1	1–2	2–1	.	OMS	5–5	1–1
SCA	7–23	0–3	1–2	.	0–3	0–3	2–1	0–3	0–3	3–0	.	.		.	1–2	.	0–3	SCA	2–8	1–6
TEN	15–15	2–1	.	.	.	1–2	1–2	1–2	3–0	2–1	2–1	1–2	.		2–1	.	0–3	TEN	5–5	1–1
TEX	19–10	2–1	.	2–1	.	.	.	.	2–1	3–0	3–0	2–1	2–1	1–2		0–2	2–1	TEX	8–2	2–0
TAM	18–11	.	.	1–2	2–1	1–2	.	3–0	2–1	3–0	1–2	1–2	.	.	2–0		2–1	TAM	6–4	2–0
VAN	14–16	0–3	.	.	.	.	2–1	2–1	0–3	1–2	1–2	.	3–0	3–0	1–2	1–2		VAN	4–6	2–2
Tm	W–L	ALA	ARK	AUB	FLA	UGA	KEN	LSU	MSU	MIZ	OKL	OMS	SCA	TEN	TEX	TAM	VAN	Team	SR	SW

Updated for entire regular season. Texas at Texas A&M, one game cancelled.
Tie breakers: Alabama over Florida (using head-to-head result), Auburn over Arkansas (using head-to-head result), Ole Miss over Tennessee (using head-to-head result), Oklahoma over Vanderbilt (using head-to-head result).

== Rankings ==
Ranking movements Legend: ██ Increase in ranking ██ Decrease in ranking ( ) = First-place votes
	Week																	
Poll	Pre	1	2	3	4	5	6	7	8	9	10	11	12	13	14	15	16	Final
Coaches'	13	13*	9	10	8	5	7	5	4	5	5	5	5	4	4 (1)	3	3*	3
Baseball America	6	9	8	8	6	6	4	4	4	8	7	7	6	5	4	4*	4*	3
NCBWA†	13	14	9	12	10	7	7	5	4	6	5	6	5	4	4	4*	1	3
D1Baseball	15	14	11	11	8	7	7	5	4	5	5	5	5	4	4	3	3*	3
Perfect Game	15	15	11	12	8	6	8	5	4	5	5	5	5	4	4	4*	4*	3

† NCBWA ranks 30 teams in their preseason poll, but only ranks 25 teams weekly during the season.
* A new poll was not released for this week, so for comparison purposes, the previous week's ranking is inserted in this week's slot.
