= Southeastern Conference Baseball Player of the Year =

Southeastern Conference Player of the Year
- Awarded for: the most outstanding baseball player in the Southeastern Conference
- Country: United States
- First award: 1993-present
- Currently held by: Daniel Jackson

The Southeastern Conference Player of the Year is a baseball award given to the Southeastern Conference's most outstanding player. The award was first given following the 1993 season, with both pitchers and position players eligible. After the 2003 season, the Southeastern Conference Baseball Pitcher of the Year award was created to honor the most outstanding pitcher. It is selected by the league's head coaches, who are not allowed to vote for their own players.

The award has been shared twice, once by Stephen Head of Ole Miss and Jon Zeringue of LSU in 2004, and once by Dylan Crews of LSU and Sonny DiChiara of Auburn. Only one player has won the award twice—Matt LaPorta of Florida in 2005 and 2007. LSU has the most all-time winners, with six. Three SEC members have yet to have a winner: Missouri, Oklahoma, and Texas.

== Key ==
*	Awarded a national Player of the Year award: the Dick Howser Trophy or the Golden Spikes Award
Player (X)	Denotes the number of times the player had been awarded the Player of the Year award at that point

== Winners ==
Season	Player	School	Position	Reference
1993	Russ Johnson	LSU	Shortstop	
1994	Todd Walker	LSU	Second baseman	
1995	Todd Helton*	Tennessee	First baseman	
1996	Eddy Furniss	LSU	First baseman	
1997	Tim Hudson	Auburn	Pitcher	
1998	Jeff Pickler	Tennessee	Second baseman	
1999	Hunter Bledsoe	Vanderbilt	Third baseman	
2000	Kip Bouknight*	South Carolina	Pitcher	
2001	Chris Burke	Tennessee	Shortstop	
2002	Yaron Peters	South Carolina	First baseman	
2003	Aaron Hill	LSU	Shortstop	
2004	Stephen Head	Ole Miss	Pitcher	
2004	Jon Zeringue	LSU	Outfielder	
2005	Matt LaPorta	Florida	First baseman	
2006	Ryan Strieby	Kentucky	First baseman	
2007	Matt LaPorta (2)	Florida	First baseman	
2008	Gordon Beckham	Georgia	Shortstop	
2009	Kent Matthes	Alabama	Outfielder	
2010	Hunter Morris	Auburn	First baseman	
2011	Mike Zunino	Florida	Catcher	
2012	Raph Rhymes	LSU	Outfielder	
2013	Tony Kemp	Vanderbilt	Second baseman	
2014	A. J. Reed*	Kentucky	Pitcher/first baseman	
2015	Andrew Benintendi*	Arkansas	Outfielder	
2016	Boomer White	Texas A&M	Third baseman	
2017	Brent Rooker	Mississippi State	First baseman	
2018	Jonathan India	Florida	Third baseman	
2019	J. J. Bleday	Vanderbilt	Outfielder	
2021	Tanner Allen	Mississippi State	Outfielder	
2022	Dylan Crews	LSU	Outfielder	
2022	Sonny DiChiara	Auburn	Infielder	
2023	Dylan Crews (2)	LSU	Outfielder	
2024	Charlie Condon*	Georgia	Outfielder	
2025	Wehiwa Aloy*	Arkansas	Shortstop	
2026	Daniel Jackson*	Georgia	Catcher	

== Winners by school ==
School (year joined)	Winners	Years
LSU (1932)	8	1993, 1994, 1996, 2003, 2004, 2012, 2022, 2023
Florida (1932)	4	2005, 2007, 2011, 2018
Georgia (1932)	3	2008, 2024, 2026
Tennessee (1932)	3	1995, 1998, 2001
Vanderbilt (1932)	3	1999, 2013, 2019
Auburn (1932)	2	1997, 2010
Kentucky (1932)	2	2006, 2014
South Carolina (1991)	2	2000, 2002
Mississippi State (1932)	2	2017, 2021
Alabama (1932)	1	2009
Ole Miss (1932)	1	2004
Arkansas (1991)	2	2015, 2025
Texas A&M (2012)	1	2016
Missouri (2012)	0	—
Oklahoma (2025)	0	—
Texas (2025)	0	—
