= 2026 Kentucky Wildcats baseball team =

American college baseball season

2026 Kentucky Wildcats baseball

NCAA Morgantown Regional, 2–2
- Conference: Southeastern Conference
- Record: 33–23 (13–17 SEC)
- Head coach: Nick Mingione (10th season)
- Assistant coaches: Dan Roszel; Austin Cousino; Chase Slone
- Home stadium: Kentucky Proud Park

2026 Southeastern Conference baseball standings
	Conf.				Overall
Team	W		L	PCT	W		L	PCT
No. 3 Georgia ‍†‍‡‍^{y}	23	–	7	.767	53	–	14	.791
No. 5 Texas ‍‍‍^{y}	19	–	10	.655	46	–	15	.754
No. 17 Texas A&M ‍‍‍^{y}	18	–	11	.621	41	–	16	.719
No. 6 Alabama ‍‍‍^{y}	18	–	12	.600	42	–	21	.667
No. 16 Florida ‍‍‍^{y}	18	–	12	.600	41	–	21	.661
No. 9 Auburn ‍‍‍^{y}	17	–	13	.567	42	–	22	.656
No. 23 Arkansas ‍‍‍^{y}	17	–	13	.567	41	–	22	.651
No. 14 Mississippi State ‍‍‍^{y}	16	–	14	.533	43	–	19	.694
No. 7 Ole Miss ‍‍‍^{y}	15	–	15	.500	41	–	23	.641
Tennessee ‍‍‍^{y}	15	–	15	.500	38	–	22	.633
No. 1 Oklahoma ‍‍‍^{y}	14	–	16	.467	43	–	23	.652
Vanderbilt ‍‍‍	14	–	16	.467	33	–	25	.569
Kentucky ‍‍‍^{y}	13	–	17	.433	33	–	23	.589
LSU ‍‍‍	9	–	21	.300	30	–	28	.517
South Carolina ‍‍‍	7	–	23	.233	22	–	35	.386
Missouri ‍‍‍	6	–	24	.200	24	–	31	.436
† – Conference champion ‡ – Tournament champion y – Invited to the NCAA Tournament; As of June 22, 2026; Rankings from D1Baseball

The 2026 Kentucky Wildcats baseball team represents the University of Kentucky in the 2026 NCAA Division I baseball season. The Wildcats play their home games at Kentucky Proud Park.

== Previous season ==
The Wildcats finished 31–26, 13–17 in the SEC to finish in 13th in the conference. They lost to South Carolina in the SEC tournament. The Wildcats then competed in the NCAA tournament, and were defeated in the Clemson Regional going 2–2 in the regional.

== Personnel ==
=== Roster ===
2026 Kentucky Wildcats roster
Pitchers: 0 – Jaxon Jelkin – Junior; 5 – Jack Bennett – Senior; 7 – Toby Peterson – Freshman; 8 – Nile Adcock – Senior; 12 – Connor Mattison – Junior; 16 – Ira Austin IV – Senior; 17 – Cameron Owens – (redshirt) Freshman; 19 – Jack Sams – Freshman; 20 – Tommy Skelding – (redshirt) Sophomore; 21 – Chase Alderman – (redshirt) Sophomore; 22 – Burkley Bounds – Sophomore; 28 – Lucas Hail – Freshman; 30 – Bryson Treichel – Sophomore; 31 – Oliver Boone – (redshirt) Sophomore; 35 – Jackson Soucie – Senior; 36 – Nate Harris – Sophomore; 38 – Ryan Mullan – Junior; 45 – Leighton Harris – Sophomore; 47 – Will Coleman – Freshman; 48 – Ben Cleaver – Junior; 49 – Tristan Hunter – Sophomore; 50 – Will Pryor – Junior	Catchers: 4 – Alex Duffey – Senior; 13 – Tagger Tyson – Junior; 29 – Owen Jenkins – Freshman; Infielders: 1 – Caeden Cloud – Freshman; 2 – Tyler Cerny – Senior; 6 – Tyler Bell – Sophomore; 9 – Ethan Hindle – Junior; 10 – Luke Lawrence – Senior; 23 – Hudson Brown – (redshirt) Sophomore; 41 – Maxime Boies – Freshman; 44 – Michael Gardner – Freshman	Outfielders: 3 – Will Marcy – Senior; 11 – Scott Campbell Jr. – Senior; 24 – Braxton Van Cleave – Freshman; 25 – Ryan Schwartz – Sophomore; 33 – Ryan Foscolo – Freshman; 34 – Carson Hansen – Senior; 37 – Jayce Tharnish – Junior

=== Coaching staff ===
2026 Kentucky Wildcats coaching staff
Name	Position
Nick Mingione	Head coach
Dan Roszel	Assistant Coach/Pitching
Austin Cousino	Assistant Coach/Recruiting Coordinator
Chase Slone	Assistant Coach/Hitting

== Schedule and results ==
2026 Kentucky Wildcats baseball game log (33–23)
Regular season (31–20)

February (8–2)
Date	Opponent	Rank	Site/stadium	Score	Win	Loss	Save	TV	Attendance	Overall record	SEC record
February 13	at UNC Greensboro*	No. 18	UNCG Baseball Stadium	**W** 13–2	**Jelkin** (1–0)	Chapman (0–1)			398	1–0	–
February 14 (DH 1)	at UNC Greensboro*	No. 18	UNCG Baseball Stadium	**W** 11–3	**Cleaver** (1–0)	Weaver (0–1)			655	2–0	–
February 14 (DH 2)	at UNC Greensboro*	No. 18	UNCG Baseball Stadium	**W** 10–6	**N. Harris** (1–0)	Shuey (0–1)			655	3–0	–
February 17	Morehead State*	No. 18	Kentucky Proud Park	**L** 6–8	Hayes (1–0)	**Adcock** (0–1)	Costa (2)	SECN+	1,811	3–1	–
February 20	at Evansville*	No. 18	Charles H. Braun Stadium	**W** 9–2	**Jelkin** (2–0)	Deverman (0–2)		ESPN+	715	4–1	–
February 21 (DH 1)	at Evansville*	No. 18	Charles H. Braun Stadium	**W** 5–3	**Mullan** (1–0)	McCormack (0–1)	**Bennett** (1)		695	5–1	–
February 21 (DH 2)	at Evansville*	No. 18	Charles H. Braun Stadium	**L** 0–1	Reed (1–1)	**N. Harris** (1–1)	Graham (1)		695	5–2	–
February 25	Western Kentucky*	No. 22	Kentucky Proud Park	**W** 13–9	**Bounds** (1–0)	Reinburg (0–1)		SECN+	2,217	6–2	–
February 27	St. John's*	No. 22	Kentucky Proud Park	**W** 3–1	**Jelkin** (3–0)	O'Leary (0–2)	**Bennett** (2)	SECN+	2,508	7–2	–
February 28	St. John's*	No. 22	Kentucky Proud Park	**W** 3–0	**Mattison** (1–0)	Chaffee (0–3)	**Soucie** (1)	SECN+	2,876	8–2	–

March (14–4)
Date	Opponent	Rank	Site/stadium	Score	Win	Loss	Save	TV	Attendance	Overall record	SEC record
March 1	St. John's*	No. 22	Kentucky Proud Park	**W** 3–1	**N. Harris** (2–1)	Mowad (1–1)	**Bounds** (1)	SECN+	2,300	9–2	–
March 3	at Eastern Kentucky*	No. 21	Turkey Hughes Field	**W** 10–0^{7}	**Skelding** (1–0)	Pumphrey (0–1)		ESPN+	1,011	10–2	–
March 4	Eastern Kentucky*	No. 21	Kentucky Proud Park	**W** 8–4	**Adcock** (1–1)	Cartledge (0–1)		SECN+	2,218	11–2	–
March 6	The Citadel*	No. 21	Kentucky Proud Park	**W** 10–5	**Mattison** (2–0)	Gibson (1–1)	**Bennett** (3)	SECN+	2,962	12–2	–
March 7	The Citadel*	No. 21	Kentucky Proud Park	**W** 12–7	**Bounds** (2–1)	Brown (0–2)		SECN+	2,166	13–2	–
March 8	The Citadel*	No. 21	Kentucky Proud Park	**W** 13–5	**Bennett** (1–0)	Bottar (0–1)		SECN+	2,392	14–2	–
March 10	Ball State*	No. 21	Kentucky Proud Park	**W** 10–3	**Boone** (1–0)	Jones (0–2)		SECN+	2,694	15–2	–
March 13	Alabama	No. 21	Kentucky Proud Park	**W** 7–4	**Jelkin** (4–0)	Fay (3–2)	**Bennett** (4)	SECN+	2,717	16–2	1–0
March 14	Alabama	No. 21	Kentucky Proud Park	**W** 8–7	**Skelding** (2–0)	Adams (3–1)	**Bennett** (5)	SECN+	3,178	17–2	2–0
March 15	Alabama	No. 21	Kentucky Proud Park	**W** 6–4	**N. Harris** (3–1)	Upchurch (3–2)	**Adcock** (1)	SECN+	3,046	18–2	3–0
March 17	Marshall*	No. 15	Kentucky Proud Park		Postponed						
March 19	at Ole Miss	No. 15	Swayze Field	**L** 0–5	Elliott (3–0)	**Cleaver** (1–1)	Rabe (2)	SECN	9,013	18–3	3–1
March 20	at Ole Miss	No. 15	Swayze Field	**W** 3–1	**Jelkin** (5–0)	Calhoun (1–1)	**Adcock** (2)	SECN+	9,710	19–3	4–1
March 21	at Ole Miss	No. 15	Swayze Field	**L** 9–12	Hooks (1–0)	**Bounds** (2–1)		SECN+	9,873	19–4	4–2
March 24	Murray State*	No. 19	Kentucky Proud Park	**W** 14–4^{7}	Mullan (2–0)	Rees (2–2)		SECN+	3,046	20–4	–
March 27	at LSU	No. 19	Alex Box Stadium	**W** 7–4	**Jelkin** (6–0)	Evans (2–1)		SECN+	11,828	21–4	5–2
March 28	at LSU	No. 19	Alex Box Stadium	**L** 0–7	Schmidt (4–1)	**N. Harris** (3–2)	Cowan (1)	SECN+	11,268	21–5	5–3
March 29	at LSU	No. 19	Alex Box Stadium	**L** 10–17	Sheerin (3–0)	**Bennett** (1–1)	Fontenot (2)	SECN+	11,010	21–6	5–4
March 31	Miami (OH)*	No. 24	Kentucky Proud Park	**W** 14–11	**Adcock** (2–1)	Preisel (0–1)		SECN+	3,733	22–6	–

April (5–9)
Date	Opponent	Rank	Site/stadium	Score	Win	Loss	Save	TV	Attendance	Overall record	SEC record
April 3	Missouri	No. 24	Kentucky Proud Park	**L** 4–5	Lawrence (2–0)	**Soucie** (0–1)		SECN+	2,343	22–7	5–5
April 4	Missouri	No. 24	Kentucky Proud Park	**W** 9–2	**N. Harris** (4–2)	Kehlenbrink (3–4)	None	SECN+	3,471	23–7	6–5
April 5	Missouri	No. 24	Kentucky Proud Park	**L** 2–5	Villareal (1–0)	**Cleaver** (1–2)	Skidmore (1)	SECN	2,611	23–8	6–6
April 7	Louisville*		Kentucky Proud Park	**W** 4–2	**Boone** (2–0)	Brown (3–2)	Bennett (6)	SECN	3,694	24–8	–
April 10	at No. 15 Auburn		Plainsman Park	**L** 5–12	Alvarez (6–1)	**Jelkin** (6–1)		SECN+	6,662	24–9	6–7
April 11	at No. 15 Auburn		Plainsman Park	**W** 5–4	**Adcock** (3–1)	Marciano (3–2)	**L. Harris** (1)	SECN	6,519	25–9	7–7
April 12	at No. 15 Auburn		Plainsman Park	**L** 0–11^{7}	Petrovic (6–1)	Cleaver (1–3)		SECN	5,004	25–10	7–8
April 17	Vanderbilt		Kentucky Proud Park	**W** 5–2	**Adcock** (4–1)	Baird (0–2)		SECN+	4,416	26–10	8–8
April 18	Vanderbilt		Kentucky Proud Park	**L** 7–8	Kranzler (2–3)	**Bennett** (1–2)	Seiber (1)	SECN+	3,489	26–11	8–9
April 19	Vanderbilt		Kentucky Proud Park	**L** 6–13	Stillman (2–1)	**Mattison** (2–1)	Baird (4)	SECN+	3,709	26–12	8–10
April 21	at Louisville*		Jim Patterson Stadium	**L** 10–14	England (2-2)	**Bennett** (1–3)	Michael (1)	ACCN	4,444	26–13	–
April 24	at South Carolina		Founders Park	**L** 9–10	Parks (4–1)	**Jelkin** (6–2)	Marlatt (1)	SECN+	6,610	26–14	8–11
April 25	at South Carolina		Founders Park	**L** 4–9	Stone (5–2)	**Boone** (2–1)		SECN+	6,625	26–15	8–12
April 26	at South Carolina		Founders Park	**W** 9–5	**Sams** (1–0)	Philpott (0–4)	**Bennett** (7)	SECN	6,542	27–15	9–12

May (4–5)
Date	Opponent	Rank	Site/stadium	Score	Win	Loss	Save	TV	Attendance	Overall record	SEC record
May 1	Tennessee		Kentucky Proud Park	**W** 9–2	**Cleaver** (2–3)	Kuhns (3–4)		SECN+	4,660	28–15	10–12
May 2	Tennessee		Kentucky Proud Park	**W** 12–2^{8}	**Jelkin** (7–2)	Blanco (5–3)		SECN+	4,565	29–15	11–12
May 3	Tennessee		Kentucky Proud Park	**L** 9–10	Mack (4–4)	**Mattison** (2–2)	Arvidson (2)	SECN+	3,959	29–16	11–13
May 8	at No. 21 Florida		Condron Ballpark	**L** 6–7	Whritenour (3–3)	**Austin IV** (0–1)		SECN+	5,937	29–17	11–14
May 9	at No. 21 Florida		Condron Ballpark	**W** 4–2	**Jelkin** (8–2)	Peterson (1–5)		SECN+	5,489	30–17	12–14
May 10	at No. 21 Florida		Condron Ballpark	**L** 6–9	McDonald (5–1)	**Peterson** (0–1)		SECN	5,113	30–18	12–15
May 12	Northern Kentucky*		Kentucky Proud Park	**Canceled**							
May 14	No. 12 Arkansas		Kentucky Proud Park	**W** 4–3	**Sams** (2–0)	Dietz (7–3)	Jelkin (1)	SECN+	3,272	31–18	13–15
May 15	No. 12 Arkansas		Kentucky Proud Park	**L** 4–5	McElvain (5–0)	**L. Harris** (0–1)		SECN+	4,000	31–19	13–16
May 16	No. 12 Arkansas		Kentucky Proud Park	**L** 12–16	Coil (3–0)	**Hunter** (0–1)	DeCremer (1)	SECN+	3,963	31–20	13–17

Postseason (2–3)

SEC tournament (0–1)
Date	Opponent	Rank	Site/stadium	Score	Win	Loss	Save	TV	Attendance	Overall record	SECT record
May 19	vs. (12) Vanderbilt	(13)	Hoover Metropolitan Stadium	**L** 5–8	Kranzler (3–3)	**Jelkin** (8–3)	None	SECN	6,748	31–21	0–1

Morgantown Regional (2–2)
Date	Opponent	Rank	Site/stadium	Score	Win	Loss	Save	TV	Attendance	Overall record	NCAAT record
May 29	vs. (2) Wake Forest	(3)	Kendrick Family Ballpark	**W** 6–5	**Adcock** (5–1)	Ray (2–1)	**Soucie** (2)	ESPN2	3,934	32–21	1–0
May 30	at (1) No. 9 West Virginia	(3)	Kendrick Family Ballpark	**W** 11–9	**Bennett** (2–3)	Bassinger (4–3)	None	SECN	4,276	33–21	2–0
May 31	at (1) No. 9 West Virginia	(3)	Kendrick Family Ballpark	**L** 9–11	McDougal (1–0)	**Soucie** (0–2)	None	SECN	4,184	33–22	2–1
June 1	at (1) No. 9 West Virginia	(3)	Kendrick Family Ballpark	**L** 5–6^{10}	Montesa (4–4)	**Bennett** (2–4)	None	ESPN2		33–23	3–1

Legend: = Win = Loss = Canceled
Bold = Kentucky team member
Rankings are based on the team's current ranking in the D1Baseball poll.
*Denotes non-conference game

Schedule source:

== Record vs. conference opponents ==
Blank are not scheduled. Blue are home games, otherwise away.

2026 SEC baseball records Source: 2026 SEC baseball game results, 2026 SEC baseball schedule
Tm	W–L	ALA	ARK	AUB	FLA	UGA	KEN	LSU	MSU	MIZ	OKL	OMS	SCA	TEN	TEX	TAM	VAN	Tm	SR	SW
ALA	18–12		0–3	3–0	3–0	.	0–3	.	.	.	2–1	2–1	3–0	1–2	1–2	.	3–0	ALA	6–4	4–2
ARK	17–13	3–0		1–2	0–3	1–2	2–1	.	2–1	2–1	2–1	2–1	2–1	.	.	.	.	ARK	7–3	1–1
AUB	17–13	0–3	2–1		2–1	1–2	2–1	.	2–1	3–0	2–1	.	.	.	1–2	2–1	.	AUB	7–3	1–1
FLA	18–12	0–3	3–0	1–2		2–1	2–1	3–0	.	.	2–1	1–2	3–0	.	.	1–2	.	FLA	6–4	3–1
UGA	23–7	.	2–1	2–1	1–2		.	3–0	3–0	3–0	.	2–1	3–0	2–1	.	2–1	.	UGA	9–1	4–0
KEN	13–17	3–0	1–2	1–2	1–2	.		1–2	.	1–2	.	1–2	1–2	2–1	.	.	1–2	KEN	2–8	1–0
LSU	9–21	.	.	.	0–3	0–3	2–1		0–3	.	1–2	0–3	3–0	2–1	.	0–3	1–2	LSU	3–7	1–5
MSU	16–14	.	1–2	1–2	.	0–3	.	3–0		.	.	3–0	3–0	0–3	1–2	1–2	3–0	MSU	4–6	4–2
MIZ	6–24	.	1–2	0–3	.	0–3	2–1	.	.		0–3	.	0–3	1–2	0–3	0–3	2–1	MIZ	2–8	0–6
OKL	14–16	1–2	1–2	1–2	1–2	.	.	2–1	.	3–0		.	.	1–2	0–3	2–1	2–1	OKL	4–6	1–1
OMS	15–15	1–2	1–2	.	2–1	1–2	2–1	3–0	0–3	.	.		.	2–1	1–2	2–1	.	OMS	5–5	1–1
SCA	7–23	0–3	1–2	.	0–3	0–3	2–1	0–3	0–3	3–0	.	.		.	1–2	.	0–3	SCA	2–8	1–6
TEN	15–15	2–1	.	.	.	1–2	1–2	1–2	3–0	2–1	2–1	1–2	.		2–1	.	0–3	TEN	5–5	1–1
TEX	19–10	2–1	.	2–1	.	.	.	.	2–1	3–0	3–0	2–1	2–1	1–2		0–2	2–1	TEX	8–2	2–0
TAM	18–11	.	.	1–2	2–1	1–2	.	3–0	2–1	3–0	1–2	1–2	.	.	2–0		2–1	TAM	6–4	2–0
VAN	14–16	0–3	.	.	.	.	2–1	2–1	0–3	1–2	1–2	.	3–0	3–0	1–2	1–2		VAN	4–6	2–2
Tm	W–L	ALA	ARK	AUB	FLA	UGA	KEN	LSU	MSU	MIZ	OKL	OMS	SCA	TEN	TEX	TAM	VAN	Team	SR	SW

Updated for entire regular season. Texas at Texas A&M, one game cancelled.
Tie breakers: Alabama over Florida (using head-to-head result), Auburn over Arkansas (using head-to-head result), Ole Miss over Tennessee (using head-to-head result), Oklahoma over Vanderbilt (using head-to-head result).

== Rankings ==
Ranking movements Legend: ██ Increase in ranking ██ Decrease in ranking — = Not ranked RV = Received votes т = Tied with team above or below
	Week																	
Poll	Pre	1	2	3	4	5	6	7	8	9	10	11	12	13	14	15	16	Final
Coaches'	RV	RV*	RV	24	22	18	18т	22	RV	RV	—	—	—	—	—	—	—*	
Baseball America	—	25	—	—	—	20	21	25	—	—	—	—	—	—	—	—*	—*	
NCBWA†	21	18	RV	RV	25	19	19	23	RV	RV	RV	RV	RV	RV	—	—*	25	
D1Baseball	18	18	22	21	21	15	19	24	—	—	—	—	—	—	—	—	—*	
Perfect Game	—	—	—	25	24	16	20	—	—	—	—	—	—	—	—	—*	—*	

† NCBWA ranks 30 teams in their preseason poll, but only ranks 25 teams weekly during the season.
* A new poll was not released for this week, so for comparison purposes, the previous week's ranking is inserted in this week's slot.
