= 2026 Auburn Tigers baseball team =

American college baseball season

2026 Auburn Tigers baseball

NCAA Auburn Regional Champions

NCAA Auburn Super Regional, 0–2
- Conference: Southeastern Conference

Ranking
- Coaches: No. 9
- D1Baseball.com: No. 9
- Record: 42–22 (17–13 SEC)
- Head coach: Butch Thompson (11th season)
- Assistant coaches: Gabe Gross; Karl Nonemaker
- Home stadium: Plainsman Park

2026 Southeastern Conference baseball standings
	Conf.				Overall
Team	W		L	PCT	W		L	PCT
No. 3 Georgia ‍†‍‡‍^{y}	23	–	7	.767	53	–	14	.791
No. 5 Texas ‍‍‍^{y}	19	–	10	.655	46	–	15	.754
No. 17 Texas A&M ‍‍‍^{y}	18	–	11	.621	41	–	16	.719
No. 6 Alabama ‍‍‍^{y}	18	–	12	.600	42	–	21	.667
No. 16 Florida ‍‍‍^{y}	18	–	12	.600	41	–	21	.661
No. 9 Auburn ‍‍‍^{y}	17	–	13	.567	42	–	22	.656
No. 23 Arkansas ‍‍‍^{y}	17	–	13	.567	41	–	22	.651
No. 14 Mississippi State ‍‍‍^{y}	16	–	14	.533	43	–	19	.694
No. 7 Ole Miss ‍‍‍^{y}	15	–	15	.500	41	–	23	.641
Tennessee ‍‍‍^{y}	15	–	15	.500	38	–	22	.633
No. 1 Oklahoma ‍‍‍^{y}	14	–	16	.467	43	–	23	.652
Vanderbilt ‍‍‍	14	–	16	.467	33	–	25	.569
Kentucky ‍‍‍^{y}	13	–	17	.433	33	–	23	.589
LSU ‍‍‍	9	–	21	.300	30	–	28	.517
South Carolina ‍‍‍	7	–	23	.233	22	–	35	.386
Missouri ‍‍‍	6	–	24	.200	24	–	31	.436
† – Conference champion ‡ – Tournament champion y – Invited to the NCAA Tournament; As of June 22, 2026; Rankings from D1Baseball

The 2026 Auburn Tigers baseball team represented Auburn University in the 2026 NCAA Division I baseball season. The Tigers played their home games at Plainsman Park.

== Previous season ==
In 2025, the Tigers finished 41–20, 17–13 in conference. They finished 6th in the SEC.

== Personnel ==
=== Roster ===
2026 Auburn Tigers roster
Pitchers: 4 – Jake Marciano – Sophomore; 6 – Drew Whalen – Junior; 9 – Jett Johnston – Junior; 12 – Garrett Brewer – Junior; 13 – Ethan Harden – (redshirt) Junior; 16 – Clayton Armah – Freshman; 20 – Marcel Kulik – Sophomore; 21 – Andreas Alvarez – Sophomore; 22 – Connor Gatwood – (redshirt) Freshman; 24 – Justice de Jong – Freshman; 27 – Christian Chatterton – Sophomore; 28 – Ryan Hetzler – Junior; 32 – Griffin Graves – Junior; 33 – Mason Koch – Senior; 36 – Jackson Sanders – Sophomore; 37 – Trevor Booton – (redshirt) Sophomore; 41 – LJ Cormier – Freshman; 42 – Abe Chancellor – (redshirt) Senior; 43 – Alex Petrovic – (redshirt) Sophomore; 46 – Saxon Roberts – (redshirt) Freshman; 52 – Tanner Waldrop – (redshirt) Freshman	Catchers: 3 – Chase Fralick – Sophomore; 10 – Lucas Steele – Senior; 25 – Taylor Belza – Freshman; 52 – Tanner Waldrop – (redshirt) Junior; Infielders: 1 – Ryne Farber – Junior; 2 – Chris Rembert – Sophomore; 7 – Todd Clay – Senior; 8 – Eric Guevara – Junior; 11 – Brandon McCraine – (redshirt) Freshman; 23 – Eddie Madrigal – (redshirt) Junior; 26 – Caiden Combs – Freshman; 44 – Ty Thompson – Freshman	Outfielders: 5 – Bristol Carter – Junior; 14 – Cade Belyeu – Junior; 17 – Mason McCraine – Freshman; 19 – Bub Terrell – Sophomore; 40 – Wade Shelley – Freshman

=== Coaching staff ===
2025 Auburn Tigers coaching staff
Name	Position
Butch Thompson	Head coach
Karl Nonemaker	Associate Head Coach
Gabe Gross	Associate Head Coach
Everett Teaford	Pitching Coach

== Schedule and results ==
2026 Auburn Tigers baseball game log (42–22)
Regular season (36–18)

February (8–2)
Date	Opponent	Rank	Site/stadium	Score	Win	Loss	Save	TV	Attendance	Overall record	SEC record
February 13	Youngstown State*	No. 9	Plainsman Park	**W** 2–1	**Whalen** (1–0)	Zmolik (0–1)	**Brewer** (1)	SECN+	5,688	1–0	–
February 14 (DH 1)	Youngstown State*	No. 9	Plainsman Park	**W** 2–1 (10)	**Hetzler** (1–0)	English (0–1)	–	SECN+	5,710	2–0	–
February 14 (DH 2)	Youngstown State*	No. 9	Plainsman Park	**W** 17–2 (7)	**Petrovic** (1–0)	Mikos (0–1)	–	SECN+	5,710	3–0	–
February 17	Cincinnati*	No. 9	Plainsman Park	**L** 0–8	Marsh (2–0)	**Alvarez** (0–1)	–	SECN+	5,696	3–1	–
Amegy Bank College Baseball Series
February 20	vs. Kansas State*	No. 9	Globe Life Field; Arlington, TX	**W** 5–1	**Marciano** (1–0)	Guyette (1–1)	–	FloCollege	3,219	4–1	–
February 21	vs. No. 16 Florida State*	No. 9	Globe Life Field	**W** 8–5	**Sanders** (1–0)	O'Leary (1–1)	**Hetzler** (1)	FloCollege	3,702	5–1	–
February 22	vs. No. 15 Louisville*	No. 9	Globe Life Field	**W** 10–6	**Petrovic** (2–0)	Danilowicz (1–1)	**Brewer** (2)	FloCollege		6–1	–
February 25	West Georgia*	No. 7	Plainsman Park	**W** 4–3	**Hetzler** (2–0)	Kenny (0–1)	–	SECN+	5,194	7–1	–
February 27	Nebraska*	No. 7	Plainsman Park	**L** 8–9 (10)	Unger (1–1)	**Brewer** (0–1)	Bender (1)	SECN+	6,000	7–2	–
February 28	Nebraska*	No. 7	Plainsman Park	**W** 15–4 (7)	**Chatterton** (1–0)	Jasa (1–1)	–	SECN+	6,687	8–2	–

March (12–6)
Date	Opponent	Rank	Site/stadium	Score	Win	Loss	Save	TV	Attendance	Overall record	SEC record
March 1	Nebraska*	No. 7	Plainsman Park	**W** 12–3	**Petrovic** (3–0)	Blachowicz (1–1)	–	SECN+	5,411	9–2	–
March 3	Samford*	No. 7	Plainsman Park	**W** 6–2	**Alvarez** (1–1)	Berry (1–1)	–	SECN+	5,289	10–2	–
March 6	Winthrop*	No. 7	Plainsman Park	**W** 10–0 (7)	**Marciano** (2–0)	Gilley (3–1)	–	SECN+	5,607	11–2	–
March 7 (DH 1)	Winthrop*	No. 7	Plainsman Park	**W** 6–0	**Sanders** (2–0)	Earnhardt (2–1)	–	SECN+	5,407	12–2	–
March 7 (DH 2)	Winthrop*	No. 7	Plainsman Park	**W** 8–1	**Chatterton** (2–0)	Guzman (0–2)	–	SECN+	5,407	13–2	–
March 10	UAB*	No. 6	Plainsman Park	**W** 17–2 (7)	**Alvarez** (2–1)	Conner (1–1)	–	SECN+	4,728	14–2	–
March 13	at Missouri	No. 6	Taylor Stadium; Columbia, MO	**W** 2–0	**Marciano** (3–0)	Dohrmann (1–1)	**Brewer** (3)	SECN+	1,375	15–2	1–0
March 14 (DH 1)	at Missouri	No. 6	Taylor Stadium	**W** 4–3 (10)	**Hetzler** (3–0)	Rosand (1–2)	–	SECN+	1,475	16–2	2–0
March 14 (DH 2)	at Missouri	No. 6	Taylor Stadium	**W** 9–2	**Petrovic** (4–0)	Kehlenbrink (3–1)	–	SECN+	1,733	17–2	3–0
March 17	No. 3 Georgia Tech*	No. 5	Plainsman Park	**W** 9–2	**Alvarez** (3–1)	Angelakos (1–1)	–	SECN+	6,498	18–2	–
March 20	No. 2 Texas	No. 5	Plainsman Park	**W** 4–3	**Brewer** (1–1)	Walker (1–1)	–	SECN+	7,247	19–2	4–0
March 21	No. 2 Texas	No. 5	Plainsman Park	**L** 6–7	Harrison (3–0)	**Sanders** (2–1)	Burns (3)	SECN+	8,037	19–3	4–1
March 22	No. 2 Texas	No. 5	Plainsman Park	**L** 0–5	Cozart (4–0)	**Petrovic** (4–1)	–	SECN+	7,011	19–4	4–2
March 24	vs South Alabama*	No. 5	Riverwalk Stadium; Montgomery, AL	**W** 10–0 (8)	**Alvarez** (4–1)	O'Del (1–1)	–	WarEagle+	2,044	20–4	–
March 27	at Alabama	No. 5	Sewell-Thomas Stadium; Tuscaloosa, AL	**L** 1–11 (8)	Fay (5–2)	**Marciano** (3–1)	None	SECN+	4,862	20–5	4–3
March 28	at Alabama	No. 5	Sewell-Thomas Stadium	**L** 2–3	Banks (1–0)	**Heltzer** (3–1)	None	SECN	5,800	20–6	4–4
March 29	at Alabama	No. 5	Sewell-Thomas Stadium	**L** 1–3	Heiberger (2–0)	**Brewer** (1–2)	Banks (4)	SECN+	5,800	20–7	4–5
March 31	at No. 3 Georgia Tech*	No. 18	Russ Chandler Stadium; Atlanta, GA	**L** 3–13 (8)	Loy (2–1)	**Chatterton** (2–1)	None	ESPN2	4,034	20–8	–

April (10–5)
Date	Opponent	Rank	Site/stadium	Score	Win	Loss	Save	TV	Attendance	Overall record	SEC record
April 2	No. 17 Arkansas	No. 18	Plainsman Park	**W** 10–2	**Alvarez** (5–1)	Gaeckle (3–3)	**Cormier** (1)	ESPN2	5,753	21–8	5–5
April 3	No. 17 Arkansas	No. 18	Plainsman Park	**L** 2–3	Dietz (3–2)	**Johnston** (0–1)	McElvain (1)	SECN+	5,678	21–9	5–6
April 4	No. 17 Arkansas	No. 18	Plainsman Park	**W** 8–3	**Petrovic** (5–1)	Fisher (2–4)	**Sanders** (1)	SECN+	5,503	22–9	6–6
April 7	Jacksonville State*	No. 15	Plainsman Park	**L** 4–15 (8)	Geraghty (1–1)	**Chatterton** (2–2)	None	SECN+	5,420	22–10	–
April 10	Kentucky	No. 15	Plainsman Park	**W** 12–5	**Alvarez** (6–1)	Jelkin (6–1)	None	SECN+		23–10	7–6
April 11	Kentucky	No. 15	Plainsman Park	**L** 4–5	Adcock (3–1)	**Marciano** (3–2)	L. Harris (1)	SECN	6,519	23–11	7–7
April 12	Kentucky	No. 15	Plainsman Park	**W** 11–0 (7)	**Petrovic** (6–1)	Cleaver (1–3)	None	SECN	5,004	24–11	8–7
April 14	Alabama State*	No. 13	Plainsman Park	**W** 13–0 (7)	**Graves** (1–0)	Sander (0–2)	None	SECN+	4,931	25–11	–
April 16	at No. 20 Florida	No. 13	Condron Ballpark; Gainesville, FL	**L** 3–6	King (6–2)	**Alvarez** (6–2)	Whritenour (7)	SECN	5,199	25–12	8–8
April 17	at No. 20 Florida	No. 13	Condron Ballpark	**W** 5–3	**Sanders** (3–1)	Peterson (1–3)	**Hetzler** (2)	SECN	5,815	26–12	9–8
April 18	at No. 20 Florida	No. 13	Condron Ballpark	**W** 8–5	**Hetzler** (4–1)	Whritenour (2–2)	None	ESPN2	5,735	27–12	10–8
April 21	at Samford*	No. 11	Hoover Met; Hoover, AL	**W** 14–2 (7)	**Cormier** (1–0)	O'Berine (1–1)	None		2,903	28–12	–
April 24	No. 14 Oklahoma	No. 11	Plainsman Park	**W** 6–4	**Alvarez** (7–2)	LJ Mercurius (6–5)	**Sanders** (2)	SECN+	5,711	29–12	11–8
April 25	No. 14 Oklahoma	No. 11	Plainsman Park	**L** 1–2	Johnson (6–1)	**Marciano** (3–3)	Leon (2)	SECN+	5,721	29–13	11–9
April 26	No. 14 Oklahoma	No. 11	Plainsman Park	**W** 14–4 (8)	**Petrovic** (7–1)	Rager (3–2)	None	SECN+	5,226	30–13	12–9

May (6–5)
Date	Opponent	Rank	Site/stadium	Score	Win	Loss	Save	TV	Attendance	Overall record	SEC record
May 2 (DH 1)	at No. 7 Texas A&M	No. 8	Blue Bell Park; College Station, TX	**W** 18–5 (7)	**Alvarez** (8–2)	Sdao (3–4)	None	SECN+	7,262	31–13	13–9
May 2 (DH 2)	at No. 7 Texas A&M	No. 8	Blue Bell Park	**W** 5–4	**Marciano** (4–3)	Sims (8–1)	**Sanders** (3)	SECN+	6,656	32–13	14–9
May 3	at No. 7 Texas A&M	No. 8	Blue Bell Park	**L** 3–4	Moss (4–2)	**Petrovic** (7–2)	Freshcorn (11)	SECN+	6,818	32–14	14–10
May 5	at UAB*	No. 6	Regions Field; Birmingham, AL	**W** 10–2	**Graves** (2–0)	Ingram (2–5)	None	ESPN+	5,171	33–14	–
May 7	at No. 11 Mississippi State	No. 6	Dudy Noble Field; Starkville, MS	**L** 3–10	Valincius (8–2)	**Marciano** (4–4)	None	ESPN2	12,658	33–15	14–11
May 8	at No. 11 Mississippi State	No. 6	Dudy Noble Field	**W** 5–4	**Sanders** (4–1)	Davis (0–2)	None	SECN	13,772	34–15	15–11
May 9	at No. 11 Mississippi State	No. 6	Dudy Noble Field	**W** 13–2 (7)	**Petrovic** (8–2)	McPherson (3-1)	None	SECN	13,506	35–15	16–11
May 12	at Jacksonville State*	No. 5	Rudy Abbott Field; Jacksonville, AL	**L** 1–4	Geraghty (2–1)	**Graves** (2–1)	Horst (1)	ESPN+	1,926	35–16	–
May 14	No. 4 Georgia	No. 5	Plainsman Park	**L** 1–2	Volchko (8–2)	**Marciano** (4–5)	Scott (4)	SECN	5,438	35–17	16–12
May 15	No. 4 Georgia	No. 5	Plainsman Park	**L** 7–9	Farley (7–1)	**Alvarez** (8–3)	Brown (1)	SECN+	5,566	35–18	16–13
May 16	No. 4 Georgia	No. 5	Plainsman Park	**W** 14–4 (8)	**Petrovic** (9–2)	Aoki (8–1)	None	SECN+	6,003	36–18	17–13

Postseason (6–4)

SEC Tournament (2–1)
Date	Opponent	Seed	Site/stadium	Score	Win	Loss	Save	TV	Attendance	Overall record	SECT Record
May 20	(14) LSU	(6); No. 6	Hoover Metropolitan Stadium; Hoover, AL	**W** 3–1	**Marciano** (5–5)	Evans (2–4)	**Sanders** (1)	SECN	14,461	37–18	1–0
May 22	(3); No. 10 Texas A&M	(6); No. 6	Hoover Metropolitan Stadium	**W** 7–0	**Alvarez** (9–3)	Darden (4–3)	**Cormier** (1)	SECN	13,105	38–18	2–0
May 23	(7); No. 12 Arkansas	(6); No. 6	Hoover Metropolitan Stadium	**L** 1–2	McElvain (6–0)	**Hetzler** (4–2)	None	SECN	14,919	38–19	2–1

Auburn Regional (4–1)
Date	Opponent	Seed	Site/stadium	Score	Win	Loss	Save	TV	Attendance	Overall record	Regional Record
May 29	(4) Milwaukee	(1); No. 5	Plainsman Park	**L** 8–13	Peterson (6–4)	**Marciano** (5–6)	None	ESPN+	6,408	38–20	0–1
May 30	(3) NC State	(1); No. 5	Plainsman Park	**W** 17–13	**Alvarez** (10–3)	Consiglio (3–5)	None	ESPN	6,608	39–20	1–1
May 31	(2) UCF	(1); No. 5	Plainsman Park	**W** 9–3	**Petrovic** (10–2)	Kimball (1–2)	**Hetzler** (1)	ESPN+	6,483	40–20	2–1
May 31	(4) Milwaukee	(1); No. 5	Plainsman Park	**W** 8–1	**Cormier** (2–0)	Kuhnke (4–2)	None	SECN	6,090	41–20	3–1
June 1	(4) Milwaukee	(1); No. 5	Plainsman Park	**W** 8–3	**Sanders** (5–1)	Weckler (0–7)	None	ESPNU	8,228	42–20	4–1

Auburn Super Regional (0–2)
Date	Opponent	Seed	Site/stadium	Score	Win	Loss	Save	TV	Attendance	Overall record	Super Regional Record
June 5	Ole Miss	(1); No. 5	Plainsman Park	**L** 4–6	Calhoun (5–3)	**Alvarez** (10–4)	Hooks (8)	ESPN2	10,627	42–21	0–1
June 6	Ole Miss	(1); No. 5	Plainsman Park	**L** 3–5	Robertson (5–1)	**Sanders** (5–2)	Hooks (9)	ESPN	10,635	42–22	0–2

- Win
- Loss
- Postponement or cancellation
- Bold: Auburn player
- Rankings from D1Baseball.com.
- (#) Tournament seedings in parentheses.

== Record vs. conference opponents ==
Blank are not scheduled. Blue are home games, otherwise away.

2026 SEC baseball records Source: 2026 SEC baseball game results, 2026 SEC baseball schedule
Tm	W–L	ALA	ARK	AUB	FLA	UGA	KEN	LSU	MSU	MIZ	OKL	OMS	SCA	TEN	TEX	TAM	VAN	Tm	SR	SW
ALA	18–12		0–3	3–0	3–0	.	0–3	.	.	.	2–1	2–1	3–0	1–2	1–2	.	3–0	ALA	6–4	4–2
ARK	17–13	3–0		1–2	0–3	1–2	2–1	.	2–1	2–1	2–1	2–1	2–1	.	.	.	.	ARK	7–3	1–1
AUB	17–13	0–3	2–1		2–1	1–2	2–1	.	2–1	3–0	2–1	.	.	.	1–2	2–1	.	AUB	7–3	1–1
FLA	18–12	0–3	3–0	1–2		2–1	2–1	3–0	.	.	2–1	1–2	3–0	.	.	1–2	.	FLA	6–4	3–1
UGA	23–7	.	2–1	2–1	1–2		.	3–0	3–0	3–0	.	2–1	3–0	2–1	.	2–1	.	UGA	9–1	4–0
KEN	13–17	3–0	1–2	1–2	1–2	.		1–2	.	1–2	.	1–2	1–2	2–1	.	.	1–2	KEN	2–8	1–0
LSU	9–21	.	.	.	0–3	0–3	2–1		0–3	.	1–2	0–3	3–0	2–1	.	0–3	1–2	LSU	3–7	1–5
MSU	16–14	.	1–2	1–2	.	0–3	.	3–0		.	.	3–0	3–0	0–3	1–2	1–2	3–0	MSU	4–6	4–2
MIZ	6–24	.	1–2	0–3	.	0–3	2–1	.	.		0–3	.	0–3	1–2	0–3	0–3	2–1	MIZ	2–8	0–6
OKL	14–16	1–2	1–2	1–2	1–2	.	.	2–1	.	3–0		.	.	1–2	0–3	2–1	2–1	OKL	4–6	1–1
OMS	15–15	1–2	1–2	.	2–1	1–2	2–1	3–0	0–3	.	.		.	2–1	1–2	2–1	.	OMS	5–5	1–1
SCA	7–23	0–3	1–2	.	0–3	0–3	2–1	0–3	0–3	3–0	.	.		.	1–2	.	0–3	SCA	2–8	1–6
TEN	15–15	2–1	.	.	.	1–2	1–2	1–2	3–0	2–1	2–1	1–2	.		2–1	.	0–3	TEN	5–5	1–1
TEX	19–10	2–1	.	2–1	.	.	.	.	2–1	3–0	3–0	2–1	2–1	1–2		0–2	2–1	TEX	8–2	2–0
TAM	18–11	.	.	1–2	2–1	1–2	.	3–0	2–1	3–0	1–2	1–2	.	.	2–0		2–1	TAM	6–4	2–0
VAN	14–16	0–3	.	.	.	.	2–1	2–1	0–3	1–2	1–2	.	3–0	3–0	1–2	1–2		VAN	4–6	2–2
Tm	W–L	ALA	ARK	AUB	FLA	UGA	KEN	LSU	MSU	MIZ	OKL	OMS	SCA	TEN	TEX	TAM	VAN	Team	SR	SW

Updated for entire regular season. Texas at Texas A&M, one game cancelled.
Tie breakers: Alabama over Florida (using head-to-head result), Auburn over Arkansas (using head-to-head result), Ole Miss over Tennessee (using head-to-head result), Oklahoma over Vanderbilt (using head-to-head result).

== Rankings ==
Ranking movements Legend: ██ Increase in ranking ██ Decrease in ranking
	Week																	
Poll	Pre	1	2	3	4	5	6	7	8	9	10	11	12	13	14	15	16	Final
Coaches'	9	9*	7	7	5	4	5	11	12	11	9	8	6	6	6	6	6*	9
Baseball America	5	5	5	6	5	4	6	11	10	6	6	6	5	4	6	6*	6*	10
NCBWA†	8	7	7	7	5	4	5	12	12	12	11	8	6	5	7	7*	4	9
D1Baseball	9	9	7	7	6	5	5	18	15	13	11	8	6	5	6	5	5*	9
Perfect Game	10	10	7	6	5	4	7	17	12	10	7	7	6	5	8	8*	8*	9

† NCBWA ranks 30 teams in their preseason poll, but only ranks 25 teams weekly during the season.
* A new poll was not released for this week, so for comparison purposes, the previous week's ranking is inserted in this week's slot.
