= Dick Howser Trophy =

US annual award for the national college baseball player of the year

- Logo for the Dick Howser Trophy
- Awarded for: College baseball's best player
- Country: United States
- Presented by: National Collegiate Baseball Writers Association

History
- First award: 1987
- Most recent: Daniel Jackson, Georgia
- Website: Dick Howser Trophy

The Dick Howser Trophy is bestowed annually to the national college baseball player of the year. The award is named after former collegiate and Major League Baseball (MLB) player and manager Dick Howser, who died as the result of brain cancer on June 17, 1987, at the age of 51. In that same year, the award was established by friends of Howser and presented to Mike Fiore, the inaugural winner. It is considered to be the Heisman Trophy of college baseball.

Six winners of the Dick Howser Trophy are members of the National College Baseball Hall of Fame. Five winners—Kris Benson, David Price, Stephen Strasburg, Adley Rutschman, and Paul Skenes—went on to become the first overall MLB draft pick. Jason Jennings, Buster Posey, and Kris Bryant went on to win the Rookie of the Year Award several years after winning the Dick Howser Trophy. Jered Weaver is the only award winner to pitch a no-hitter, while Mark Teixeira holds the record for most games with home runs from both sides of the plate. Furthermore, seventeen players won the Golden Spikes Award alongside the Dick Howser Trophy. Brooks Kieschnick is the only player to win the trophy more than once.

The winners from 1987 to 1998 were selected by the American Baseball Coaches Association (ABCA). The National Collegiate Baseball Writers Association (NCBWA) became the voting body in 1999, and now presents the award together with the St. Petersburg Chamber of Commerce in Florida. The most recent recipient of the award is Daniel Jackson of Georgia.

== Winners ==
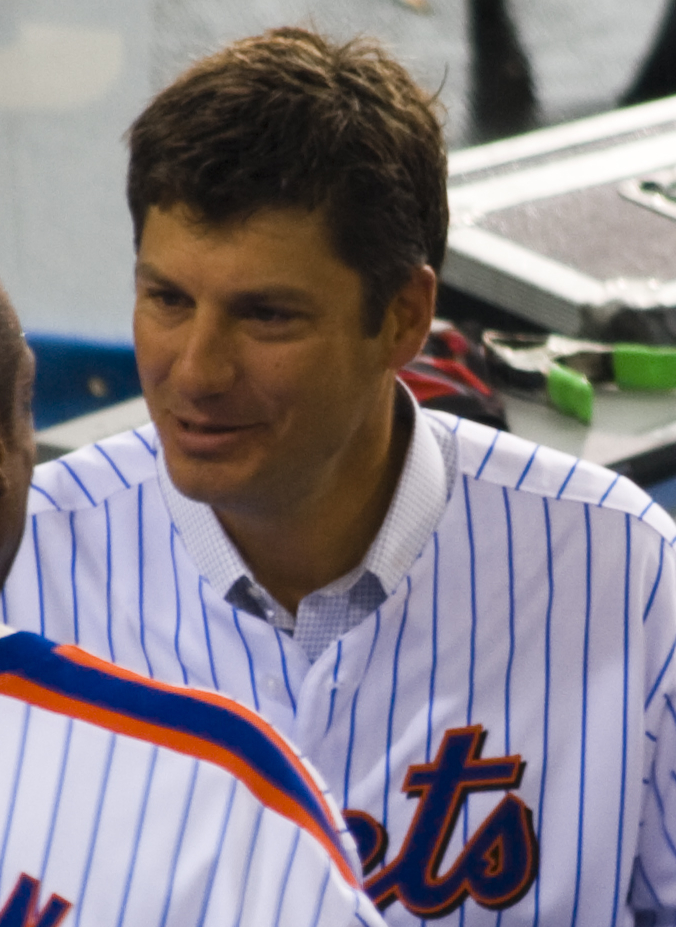
Robin Ventura, who won the Dick Howser Trophy in 1988, is one of six award winners in the National College Baseball Hall of Fame.

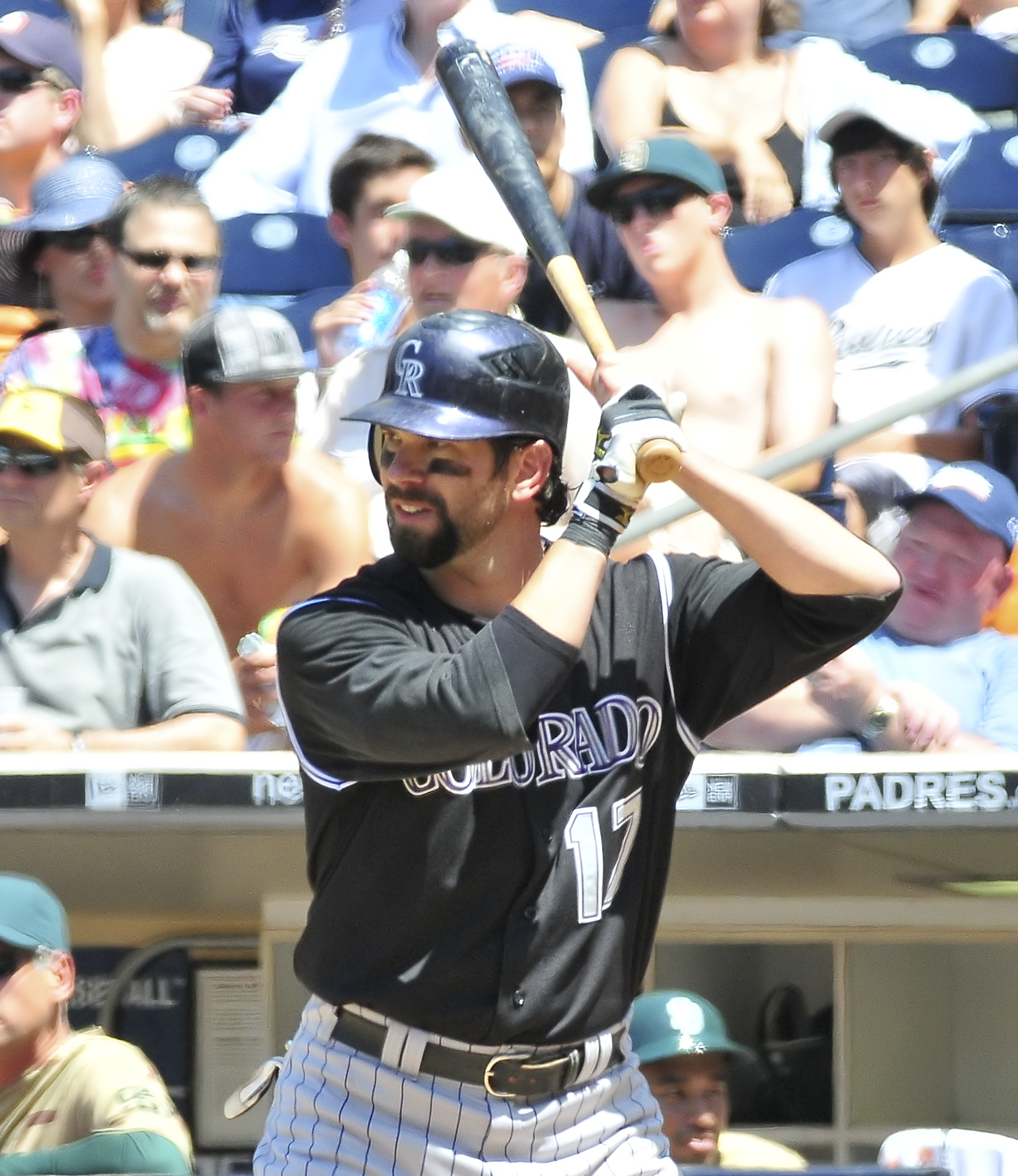
Todd Helton, the 1995 winner, is the only award winner to be elected to the National Baseball Hall of Fame.

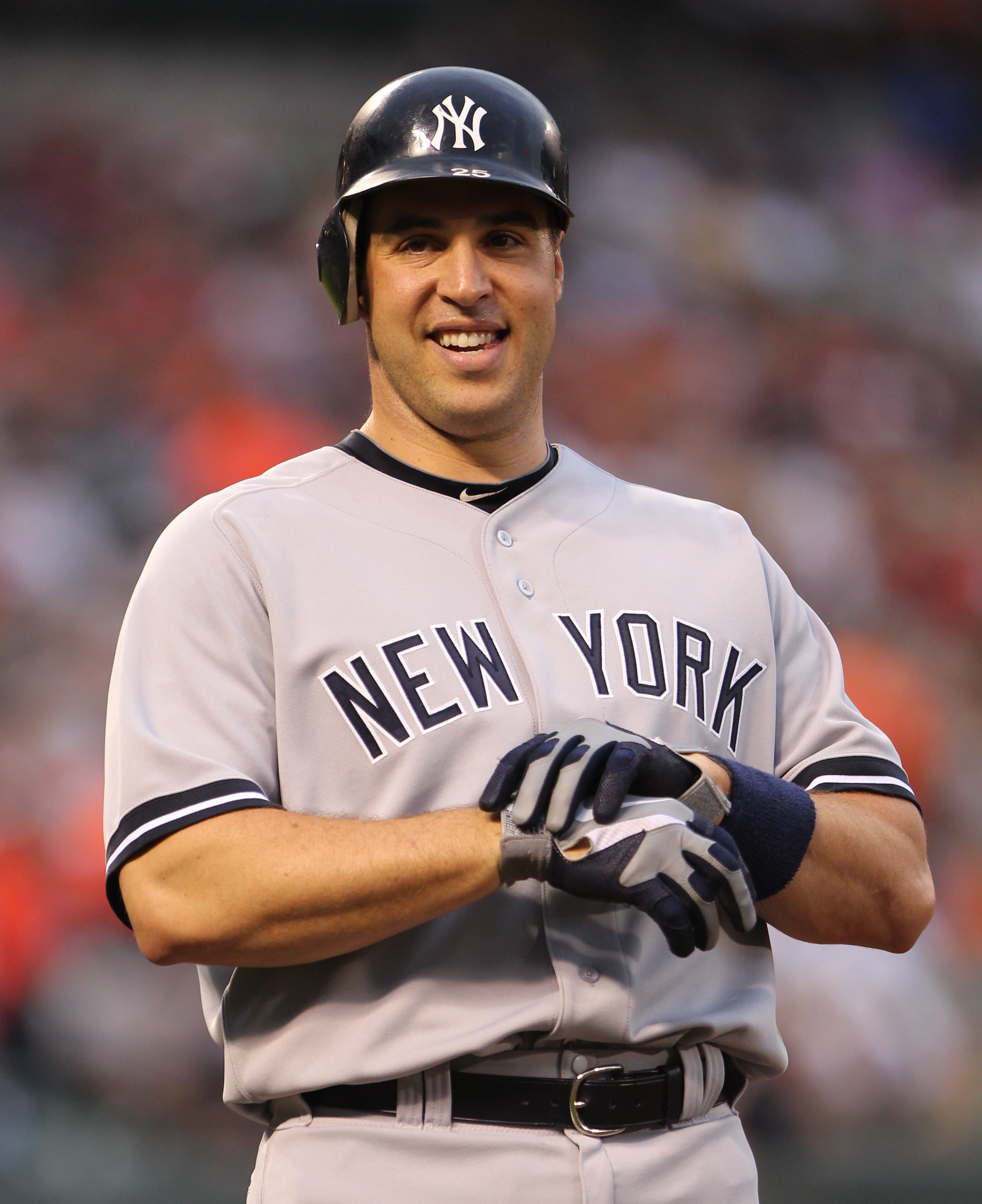
Mark Teixeira, the 2000 winner, holds the record for most games with switch-hit home runs.

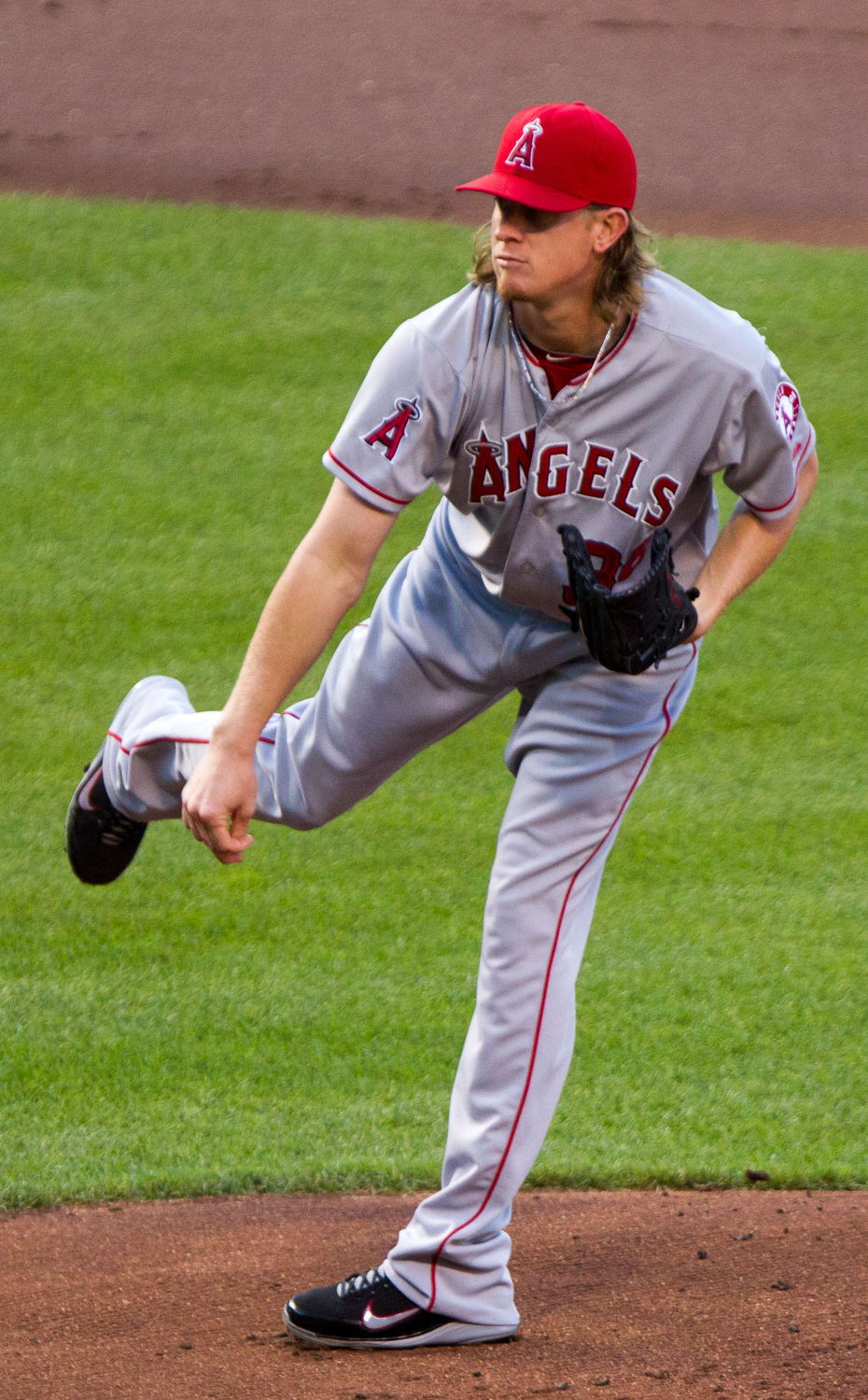
Jered Weaver, the 2004 recipient, is the only award winner to pitch a no-hitter.

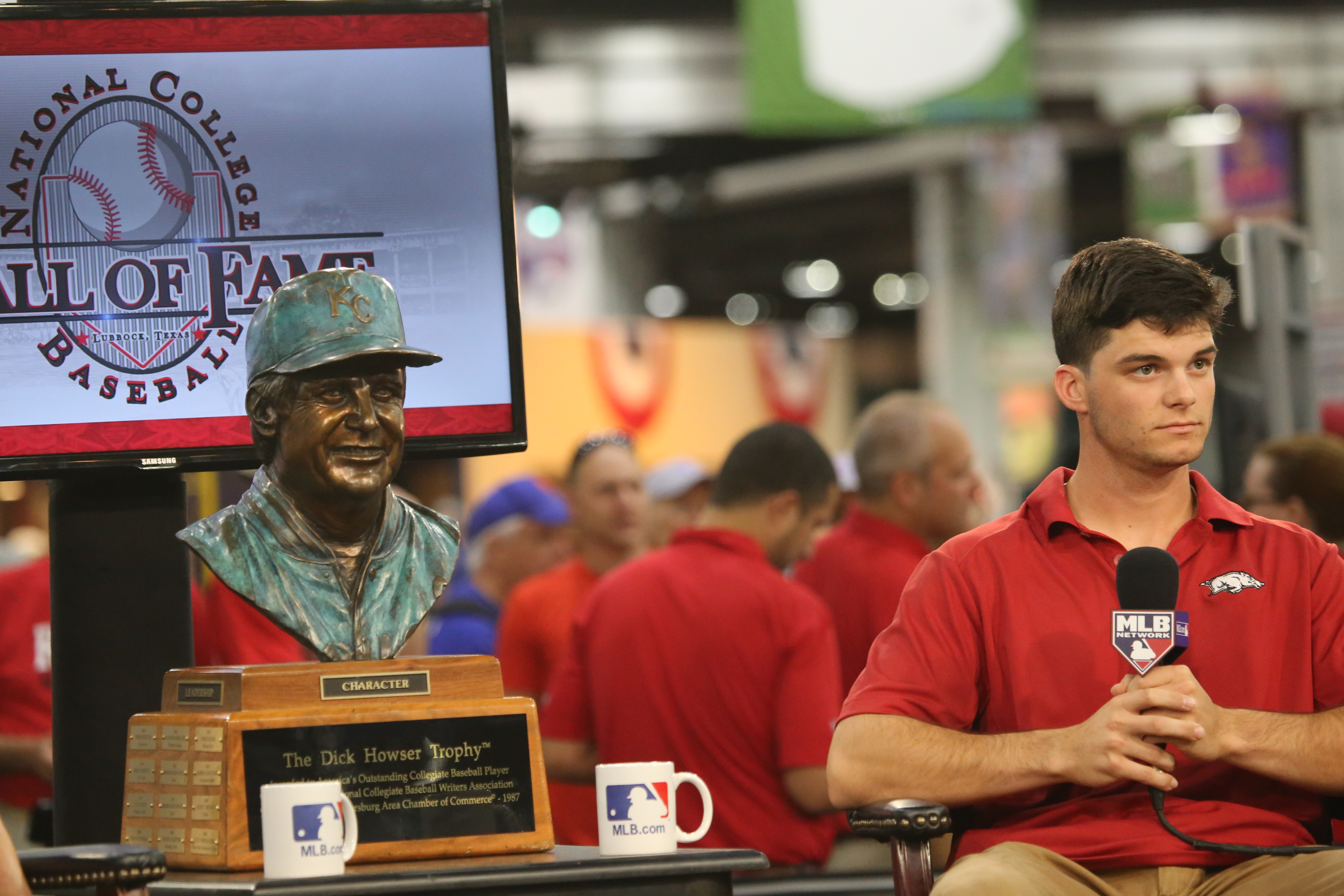
Andrew Benintendi received the award in 2015.

Key
Year	Links to the article about the corresponding baseball year
Player (X)	Name of the player and number of times they had won the award at that point
Position	The player's position at the time he won the award
School	The player's college when he won the award
Italics	Denotes player was the first overall MLB draft pick in the same year
^	Player won the Rookie of the Year Award (Note: Won either in the same year or several years later.)
§	Denotes player also won the Golden Spikes Award in the same year
*	Member of the National Baseball Hall of Fame
†	Member of the National College Baseball Hall of Fame
‡	Player is active

Winners
Year	Player	Position	School	Ref
1987	Mike Fiore^{†}	OF	Miami (FL)	
1988	Robin Ventura^{†}^{§}	3B	Oklahoma State	
1989	Scott Bryant	OF	Texas	
1990	Alex Fernández^{†}^{§}	P	Miami-Dade Community College	
1991	Frank Rodriguez	P	Howard College	
1992	Brooks Kieschnick^{†}	Utility	Texas	
1993	Brooks Kieschnick^{†} (2)	Utility	Texas	
1994	Jason Varitek^{§}	C	Georgia Tech	
1995	Todd Helton*	1B	Tennessee	
1996	Kris Benson	P	Clemson	
1997	J. D. Drew^{†}^{§}	OF	Florida State	
1998	Eddy Furniss^{†}	1B	Louisiana State	
1999	Jason Jennings^{§}^{^}	P	Baylor	
2000	Mark Teixeira	3B	Georgia Tech	
2001	Mark Prior^{§}	P	Southern California	
2002	Khalil Greene^{§}	SS	Clemson	
2003	Rickie Weeks^{§}	2B	Southern	
2004	Jered Weaver^{§}	P	Long Beach State	
2005	Alex Gordon^{§}	3B	Nebraska	
2006	Brad Lincoln	P	Houston	
2007	David Price^{§}	P	Vanderbilt	
2008	Buster Posey^{‡}^{§}^{^}	C	Florida State	
2009	Stephen Strasburg	P	San Diego State	
2010	Anthony Rendon^{‡}	3B	Rice	
2011	Taylor Jungmann	P	Texas	
2012	Mike Zunino^{‡}^{§}	C	Florida	
2013	Kris Bryant^{‡}^{§}^{^}	3B	San Diego	
2014	A. J. Reed^{§}	Utility	Kentucky	
2015	Andrew Benintendi^{‡}^{§}	OF	Arkansas	
2016	Seth Beer^{‡}	OF	Clemson	
2017	Brendan McKay^{‡}^{§}	P/1B	Louisville	
2018	Brady Singer^{‡}	P	Florida	
2019	Adley Rutschman^{‡}^{§}	C	Oregon State	
2020	Not awarded (Note: Due to the COVID-19 pandemic)	—	—	
2021	Kevin Kopps^{‡}	P	Arkansas	
2022	Ivan Melendez^{‡}^{§}	1B	Texas	
2023	Paul Skenes^{‡}	P	Louisiana State	
2024	Charlie Condon^{‡}^{§}	1B/OF	Georgia	
2025	Alex Lodise‡	SS	Florida State	
2026	Daniel Jackson^{‡}^{§}	C	Georgia	

== See also ==
- List of college baseball awards
- College baseball awards in the United States
