= 2026 South Carolina Gamecocks baseball team =

American college baseball team

2026 South Carolina Gamecocks baseball
- Conference: Southeastern Conference
- Record: 22–35 (7–23 SEC)
- Head coach: Paul Mainieri (2nd season; first 23 games); Monte Lee (interim, rest of season)
- Home stadium: Founders Park

2026 Southeastern Conference baseball standings
| | Conf. | | | | Overall |
| Team | W | | L | PCT | W | | L | PCT |
|---|---|---|---|---|---|---|---|---|
| No. 4 Georgia ‍†‍‍ | 23 | – | 7 | .767 | 43 | – | 12 | .782 |
| No. 5 Texas ‍‍‍ | 19 | – | 10 | .655 | 40 | – | 12 | .769 |
| No. 10 Texas A&M ‍‍‍ | 18 | – | 11 | .621 | 39 | – | 13 | .750 |
| No. 15 Alabama ‍‍‍ | 18 | – | 12 | .600 | 37 | – | 18 | .673 |
| No. 18 Florida ‍‍‍ | 18 | – | 12 | .600 | 37 | – | 18 | .673 |
| No. 6 Auburn ‍‍‍ | 17 | – | 13 | .567 | 36 | – | 18 | .667 |
| No. 12 Arkansas ‍‍‍ | 17 | – | 13 | .567 | 36 | – | 19 | .655 |
| No. 16 Mississippi State ‍‍‍ | 16 | – | 14 | .533 | 39 | – | 16 | .709 |
| No. 17 Ole Miss ‍‍‍ | 15 | – | 15 | .500 | 36 | – | 21 | .632 |
| No. 23 Tennessee ‍‍‍ | 15 | – | 15 | .500 | 37 | – | 19 | .661 |
| Oklahoma ‍‍‍ | 14 | – | 16 | .467 | 32 | – | 20 | .615 |
| Vanderbilt ‍‍‍ | 14 | – | 16 | .467 | 33 | – | 24 | .579 |
| Kentucky ‍‍‍ | 13 | – | 17 | .433 | 31 | – | 21 | .596 |
| LSU ‍‍‍ | 9 | – | 21 | .300 | 29 | – | 27 | .518 |
| South Carolina ‍‍‍ | 7 | – | 23 | .233 | 22 | – | 34 | .393 |
| Missouri ‍‍‍ | 6 | – | 24 | .200 | 24 | – | 30 | .444 |
† – Conference champion ‡ – Tournament champion y – Invited to the NCAA Tournament; As of May 16, 2026; Rankings from D1Baseball

The 2026 South Carolina Gamecocks baseball team represents the University of South Carolina in the 2026 NCAA Division I baseball season. The Gamecocks play their home games at Founders Park in Columbia, South Carolina. Head coach Paul Mainieri leads the team in his second season.

== Schedule and results ==
2026 South Carolina Gamecocks baseball game log (22–35)
Regular season (22–35)

February (7–4)
| Date | Opponent | Rank | Site/stadium | Score | Win | Loss | Save | TV | Attendance | Overall record | SEC record |
|---|---|---|---|---|---|---|---|---|---|---|---|
| February 13 (DH-1) | Northern Kentucky | | Founders Park; Columbia, South Carolina | **W** 5–2 | **Gunther** (1–0) | Fry (0–1) | **Valentin** (1) | SECN+ | 6,503 | 1–0 | — |
| February 13 (DH-2) | Northern Kentucky | | Founders Park | **W** 6–5 | **Foster** (1–0) | Lange (0–1) | None | SECN+ | 6,245 | 2–0 | — |
| February 14 | Northern Kentucky | | Founders Park | **L** 2–3 | Little (1–0) | **Parks** (0–1) | Stout (1) | SECN+ | 6,928 | 2–1 | — |
| February 17 | vs. Wofford | | Fifth Third Park; Spartanburg, South Carolina | **W** 8–2 | **Chicoli** (1–0) | Little (0–1) | None | ESPN+ | 4,197 | 3–1 | — |
| February 18 | Gardner–Webb | | Founders Park | **W** 12–2^{8} | **Russell** (1–0) | Putnam (0–1) | None | SECN+ | 6,142 | 4–1 | — |
| February 20 | Army | | Founders Park | **L** 5–9 | Ramirez (1–0) | **Goodman** (0–1) | None | SECN+ | 7,100 | 4–2 | — |
| February 21 | Navy | | Founders Park | **W** 8–0 | **Phillips** (1–0) | Archibald (0–2) | None | SECN+ | 6,910 | 5–2 | — |
| February 22 | Air Force | | Founders Park | **W** 4–2 | **Russell** (2–0) | Dillinger (0–1) | **Valentin** (2) | SECN+ | 6,927 | 6–2 | — |
| February 25 | Queens | | Founders Park | **L** 8–9 | Quezada (1–1) | **Chicoli** (1–1) | None | SECN+ | 6,042 | 6–3 | — |
| February 27 | No. 15 Clemson | | Founders Park | **W** 7–0 | **Gunther** (2–0) | Knaak (0–1) | None | SECN+ | 8,242 | 7–3 | — |
| February 28 | vs. No. 15 Clemson | | Segra Park | **L** 1–4 | Sharman (3–0) | **Phillips** (1–1) | None | ACCNX | 8,480 | 7–4 | — |

March (7–12)
| Date | Opponent | Rank | Site/stadium | Score | Win | Loss | Save | TV | Attendance | Overall record | SEC record |
|---|---|---|---|---|---|---|---|---|---|---|---|
| March 1 | at No. 15 Clemson | | Doug Kingsmore Stadium; Clemson, South Carolina | **L** 2–7 | Titsworth (2–0) | **Goodman** (0–2) | None | ACCNX | 6,678 | 7–5 | — |
| March 3 | USC Upstate | | Founders Park | **W** 12–3 | **Parks** (1–1) | Kaplan (2–1) | None | SECN+ | 6,039 | 8–5 | — |
| March 4 | Charleston Southern | | Founders Park | **W** 4–1 | **Stone** (1–0) | Hopke (1–1) | **Valentin** (3) | SECN+ | 6,239 | 9–5 | — |
| March 7 (DH-1) | Princeton | | Founders Park | **W** 10–7 | **Parks** (2–1) | Kim (0–2) | **Valentin** (4) | SECN+ | 6,015 | 10–5 | — |
| March 7 (DH-2) | Princeton | | Founders Park | **W** 4–3 | **Stone** (2–0) | Penney (0–2) | None | SECN+ | 5,927 | 11–5 | — |
| March 8 | Princeton | | Founders Park | **W** 13–1^{7} | **Phillips** (2–1) | Kaufman (1–1) | None | SECN+ | 5,944 | 12–5 | — |
| March 10 | at The Citadel | | Joseph P. Riley Jr. Park; Charleston, South Carolina | **L** 3–8 | Buffkin (1–0) | **Philpott** (0–1) | Gibson (2) | ESPN+ | 4,329 | 12–6 | — |
| March 13 | at No. 23 Florida | | Condron Ballpark; Gainesville, Florida | **L** 0–1^{10} | Whritenour (2–0) | **Stone** (0–1) | None | SECN+ | 5,255 | 12–7 | 0–1 |
| March 14 | at No. 23 Florida | | Condron Ballpark | **L** 0–3 | King (3–1) | **Phillips** (2–2) | Barberi (1) | SECN+ | 5,340 | 12–8 | 0–2 |
| March 15 | at No. 23 Florida | | Condron Ballpark | **L** 7–13^{7} | Walls (3–0) | **Valentin** (0–1) | None | SECN+ | 4,784 | 12–9 | 0–3 |
| March 17 | Charlotte | | Founders Park | **L** 8–11 | Taylor (3–1) | **Goodman** (0–3) | Stanton (2) | SECN+ | 5,938 | 12–10 | — |
| March 20 | No. 4 Arkansas | | Founders Park | **L** 6–22^{7} | Gaeckle (3–1) | **Gunther** (2–1) | None | SECN+ | 6,737 | 12–11 | 0–4 |
| March 21 | No. 4 Arkansas | | Founders Park | **L** 2–3^{10} | Gibler (3–0) | **Valentin** (0–2) | None | SECN+ | 6,822 | 12–12 | 0–5 |
| March 22 | No. 4 Arkansas | | Founders Park | **W** 9–4 | **Stone** (3–1) | Fisher (2–2) | None | SECN+ | 6,404 | 13–12 | 1–5 |
| March 24 | vs. No. 13 North Carolina | | Truist Field; Charlotte, North Carolina | **L** 1–9 | McDuffie (5–1) | **Chicoli** (1–2) | None | ACCNX | 2,960 | 13–13 | — |
| March 27 | at No. 7 Georgia | | Foley Field; Athens, Georgia | **L** 2–5 | Volchko (5–0) | **Gunther** (2–2) | Byrd (3) | SECN+ | 3,438 | 13–14 | 1–6 |
| March 28 | at No. 7 Georgia | | Foley Field | **L** 1–3 | Scott (5–0) | **Phillips** (2–3) | None | SECN+ | 3,285 | 13–15 | 1–7 |
| March 29 | at No. 7 Georgia | | Foley Field | **L** 7–9 | Byrd (2–1) | **Philpott** (0–2) | None | SECN+ | 3,131 | 13–16 | 1–8 |
| March 31 | Wofford | | Founders Park | **W** 11–1^{7} | **Valentin** (1–2) | Gray (1–1) | None | SECN+ | 6,658 | 14–16 | — |

April (8–8)
| Date | Opponent | Rank | Site/stadium | Score | Win | Loss | Save | TV | Attendance | Overall record | SEC record |
|---|---|---|---|---|---|---|---|---|---|---|---|
| April 2 | No. 2 Texas | | Founders Park | **W** 9–1 | **Russell** (3–0) | Riojas (5–1) | **Philpott** (1) | SECN+ | 6,657 | 15–16 | 2–8 |
| April 3 | No. 2 Texas | | Founders Park | **L** 3–5 | Harrison (4–0) | **Gunther** (2–3) | Cozart (3) | SECN+ | 6,609 | 15–17 | 2–9 |
| April 4 | No. 2 Texas | | Founders Park | **L** 1–4 | Volantis (4–0) | **Phillips** (2–4) | Cozart (4) | SECN+ | 7,025 | 15–18 | 2–10 |
| April 7 | Charleston | | Founders Park | **L** 4–6 | Hench (1–0) | **Philpott** (0–3) | None | SECN+ | 6,640 | 15–19 | — |
| April 9 | at Missouri | | Taylor Stadium; Columbia, Missouri | **W** 5–1 | **Stone** (4–1) | McDevitt (3–3) | **Russell** (1) | ESPNU | 1,512 | 16–19 | 3–10 |
| April 10 | at Missouri | | Taylor Stadium | **W** 1–0 | **Phillips** (3–4) | Kehlenbrink (3–5) | **Philpott** (2) | SECN+ | 1,260 | 17–19 | 4–10 |
| April 11 | at Missouri | | Taylor Stadium | **W** 6–4 | **Parks** (3–1) | Rosand (1–3) | **Philpott** (3) | SECN+ | 1,396 | 18–19 | 5–10 |
| April 14 | Davidson | | Founders Park | **W** 8–6 | **Prisco** (1–0) | Taggart (1–1) | **Parks** (1) | SECN+ | 6,228 | 19–19 | — |
| April 17 | No. 17 Mississippi State | | Founders Park | **L** 3–5 | Valincius (7–1) | **Stone** (4–2) | Davis (5) | SECN+ | 6,752 | 19–20 | 5–11 |
| April 18 | No. 17 Mississippi State | | Founders Park | **L** 0–9 | Stone (6–1) | **Phillips** (3–5) | None | SECN+ | 6,735 | 19–21 | 5–12 |
| April 19 | No. 17 Mississippi State | | Founders Park | **L** 3–4^{11} | Webb (1–1) | **Russell** (3–1) | None | SECN+ | 6,459 | 19–22 | 5–13 |
| April 21 | Presbyterian | | Founders Park | **W** 9–3 | **Chicoli** (2–2) | Meredith (1–3) | None | SECN+ | 6,220 | 20–22 | — |
| April 24 | Kentucky | | Founders Park | **W** 10–9 | **Parks** (4–1) | Jelkin (6–2) | **Marlatt** (1) | SECN+ | 6,610 | 21–22 | 6–13 |
| April 25 | Kentucky | | Founders Park | **W** 9–4 | **Stone** (5–2) | Boone (2–1) | None | SECN+ | 6,625 | 22–22 | 7–13 |
| April 26 | Kentucky | | Founders Park | **L** 5–9 | Sams (1–0) | **Philpott** (0–4) | Bennett (1) | SECN+ | 6,542 | 22–23 | 7–14 |
| April 28 | The Citadel | | Founders Park | **L** 0–4 | Davis (2–1) | **Gunther** (2–4) | Gibson (6) | SECN+ | 6,530 | 22–24 | — |

May (0–10)
| Date | Opponent | Rank | Site/stadium | Score | Win | Loss | Save | TV | Attendance | Overall record | SEC record |
|---|---|---|---|---|---|---|---|---|---|---|---|
| May 2 (DH-1) | at LSU | | Alex Box Stadium, Skip Bertman Field; Baton Rouge, Louisiana | **L** 1–6 | Schmidt (5–4) | **Phillips** (3–6) | Fontenot (3) | SECN+ | 10,395 | 22–25 | 7–15 |
| May 2 (DH-2) | at LSU | | Alex Box Stadium, Skip Bertman Field | **L** 3–7 | Paz (1–2) | **Stone** (5–3) | Sheerin (4) | SECN+ | 11,235 | 22–26 | 7–16 |
| May 3 | at LSU | | Alex Box Stadium, Skip Bertman Field | **L** 0–7 | Cowan (3–3) | **Valentin** (1–3) | None | SECN+ | 10,477 | 22–27 | 7–17 |
| May 8 | No. 19 Alabama | | Founders Park | **L** 3–8 | Fay (8–3) | **Phillips** (3–7) | None | SECN+ | 6,368 | 22–28 | 7–18 |
| May 9 | No. 19 Alabama | | Founders Park | **L** 6–9 | Adams (6–3) | **Stone** (5–4) | None | SECN+ | 6,308 | 22–29 | 7–19 |
| May 10 | No. 19 Alabama | | Founders Park | **L** 6–7 | Upchurch (7–3) | **Valentin** (1–4) | Heiberger (3) | SECN+ | 6,120 | 22–30 | 7–20 |
| May 12 | Winthrop | | Founders Park | **L** 2–5 | Guzman (1–4) | **Chicoli** (2–3) | McNeely (1) | SECN+ | 5,939 | 22–31 | — |
| May 14 | at Vanderbilt | | Hawkins Field; Nashville, Tennessee | **L** 1–9 | Fennell (4–2) | **Phillips** (3–8) | None | SECN+ | 3,076 | 22–32 | 7–21 |
| May 15 | at Vanderbilt | | Hawkins Field | **L** 5–9 | Shorey (2–0) | **Valentin** (1–5) | Nadeau (1) | SECN+ | 3,161 | 22–33 | 7–22 |
| May 16 | at Vanderbilt | | Hawkins Field | **L** 3–5 | Stillman (3–2) | **Philpott** (0–5) | Kranzler (1) | SECN+ | 3,106 | 22–34 | 7–23 |

Postseason (0–1)

SEC tournament (0–1)
| Date | Opponent | Rank | Site/stadium | Score | Win | Loss | Save | TV | Attendance | Overall record | SECT record |
|---|---|---|---|---|---|---|---|---|---|---|---|
| May 19 | vs. (10) No. 23 Tennessee | (15) | Hoover Metropolitan Stadium; Hoover, AL | **L** 6–11 | Appenzeller (6–1) | **Stone** (5–5) | Haas (1) | SECN | 7,617 | 22–35 | 0–1 |

Legend: = Win = Loss = Canceled
Bold = South Carolina team member
Rankings are based on the team's current ranking in the D1Baseball poll.

== Record vs. conference opponents ==
Blank are not scheduled. Blue are home games, otherwise away.

2026 SEC baseball records Source: 2026 SEC baseball game results, 2026 SEC baseball schedule
| Tm | W–L | ALA | ARK | AUB | FLA | UGA | KEN | LSU | MSU | MIZ | OKL | OMS | SCA | TEN | TEX | TAM | VAN | Tm | SR | SW |
|---|---|---|---|---|---|---|---|---|---|---|---|---|---|---|---|---|---|---|---|---|
| ALA | 18–12 | | 0–3 | 3–0 | 3–0 | . | 0–3 | . | . | . | 2–1 | 2–1 | 3–0 | 1–2 | 1–2 | . | 3–0 | ALA | 6–4 | 4–2 |
| ARK | 17–13 | 3–0 | | 1–2 | 0–3 | 1–2 | 2–1 | . | 2–1 | 2–1 | 2–1 | 2–1 | 2–1 | . | . | . | . | ARK | 7–3 | 1–1 |
| AUB | 17–13 | 0–3 | 2–1 | | 2–1 | 1–2 | 2–1 | . | 2–1 | 3–0 | 2–1 | . | . | . | 1–2 | 2–1 | . | AUB | 7–3 | 1–1 |
| FLA | 18–12 | 0–3 | 3–0 | 1–2 | | 2–1 | 2–1 | 3–0 | . | . | 2–1 | 1–2 | 3–0 | . | . | 1–2 | . | FLA | 6–4 | 3–1 |
| UGA | 23–7 | . | 2–1 | 2–1 | 1–2 | | . | 3–0 | 3–0 | 3–0 | . | 2–1 | 3–0 | 2–1 | . | 2–1 | . | UGA | 9–1 | 4–0 |
| KEN | 13–17 | 3–0 | 1–2 | 1–2 | 1–2 | . | | 1–2 | . | 1–2 | . | 1–2 | 1–2 | 2–1 | . | . | 1–2 | KEN | 2–8 | 1–0 |
| LSU | 9–21 | . | . | . | 0–3 | 0–3 | 2–1 | | 0–3 | . | 1–2 | 0–3 | 3–0 | 2–1 | . | 0–3 | 1–2 | LSU | 3–7 | 1–5 |
| MSU | 16–14 | . | 1–2 | 1–2 | . | 0–3 | . | 3–0 | | . | . | 3–0 | 3–0 | 0–3 | 1–2 | 1–2 | 3–0 | MSU | 4–6 | 4–2 |
| MIZ | 6–24 | . | 1–2 | 0–3 | . | 0–3 | 2–1 | . | . | | 0–3 | . | 0–3 | 1–2 | 0–3 | 0–3 | 2–1 | MIZ | 2–8 | 0–6 |
| OKL | 14–16 | 1–2 | 1–2 | 1–2 | 1–2 | . | . | 2–1 | . | 3–0 | | . | . | 1–2 | 0–3 | 2–1 | 2–1 | OKL | 4–6 | 1–1 |
| OMS | 15–15 | 1–2 | 1–2 | . | 2–1 | 1–2 | 2–1 | 3–0 | 0–3 | . | . | | . | 2–1 | 1–2 | 2–1 | . | OMS | 5–5 | 1–1 |
| SCA | 7–23 | 0–3 | 1–2 | . | 0–3 | 0–3 | 2–1 | 0–3 | 0–3 | 3–0 | . | . | | . | 1–2 | . | 0–3 | SCA | 2–8 | 1–6 |
| TEN | 15–15 | 2–1 | . | . | . | 1–2 | 1–2 | 1–2 | 3–0 | 2–1 | 2–1 | 1–2 | . | | 2–1 | . | 0–3 | TEN | 5–5 | 1–1 |
| TEX | 19–10 | 2–1 | . | 2–1 | . | . | . | . | 2–1 | 3–0 | 3–0 | 2–1 | 2–1 | 1–2 | | 0–2 | 2–1 | TEX | 8–2 | 2–0 |
| TAM | 18–11 | . | . | 1–2 | 2–1 | 1–2 | . | 3–0 | 2–1 | 3–0 | 1–2 | 1–2 | . | . | 2–0 | | 2–1 | TAM | 6–4 | 2–0 |
| VAN | 14–16 | 0–3 | . | . | . | . | 2–1 | 2–1 | 0–3 | 1–2 | 1–2 | . | 3–0 | 3–0 | 1–2 | 1–2 | | VAN | 4–6 | 2–2 |
| Tm | W–L | ALA | ARK | AUB | FLA | UGA | KEN | LSU | MSU | MIZ | OKL | OMS | SCA | TEN | TEX | TAM | VAN | Team | SR | SW |

Updated for entire regular season. Texas at Texas A&M, one game cancelled.
Tie breakers: ALA>FLA hd to hd, AUB>ARK hd to hd, OMS>TEN hd to hd, OKL>VAN hd to hd.

== Rankings ==
Ranking movements Legend: ██ Increase in ranking ██ Decrease in ranking — = Not ranked RV = Received votes
| | Week | | | | | | | | | | | | | | | | |
| Poll | Pre | 1 | 2 | 3 | 4 | 5 | 6 | 7 | 8 | 9 | 10 | 11 | 12 | 13 | 14 | 15 | Final |
|---|---|---|---|---|---|---|---|---|---|---|---|---|---|---|---|---|---|
| Coaches' | — | —* | — | — | — | — | — | — | — | — | | | | | | | |
| Baseball America | — | — | — | — | — | — | — | — | — | — | | | | | | | |
| NCBWA† | — | — | RV | RV | RV | — | — | — | — | — | | | | | | | |
| D1Baseball | — | — | — | — | — | — | — | — | — | — | | | | | | | |
| Perfect Game | — | — | — | — | — | — | — | — | — | — | | | | | | | |

† NCBWA ranks 30 teams in their preseason poll, but only ranks 25 teams weekly during the season.
* A new poll was not released for this week, so for comparison purposes, the previous week's ranking is inserted in this week's slot.
