= Wes Johnson (baseball) =

American baseball coach (born 1971)

Current position
- Title: Head coach
- Team: Georgia
- Conference: SEC
- Record: 139–48 (.743)

Biographical details
- Born: September 9, 1971 (age 55); Sherwood, Arkansas, U.S.
- Education: University of Arkansas at Monticello

Playing career
- 1991: Texas Wesleyan
- 1992–1993: Arkansas-Monticello

Coaching career (HC unless noted)
- 1997–2002: Sylvan Hills HS (asst.)
- 2003: Arkansas Baptist HS (asst.)
- 2004–2007: Abundant Life School
- 2008: Central Arkansas (pitching)
- 2009: Southern Arkansas (pitching)
- 2010–2011: Central Arkansas (pitching)
- 2012–2015: Dallas Baptist (pitching)
- 2016: Mississippi State (pitching)
- 2017–2018: Arkansas (pitching)
- 2019–2022: Minnesota Twins (pitching)
- 2023: LSU (pitching)
- 2024–present: Georgia

Head coaching record
- Overall: 139–48 (.743)
- Tournaments: NCAA: 11–6

Accomplishments and honors

Championships
- SEC regular season (2026); NCAA Regional (2026); CWS appearance (2026)

Awards
- SEC Coach of the Year (2026)

Wes Johnson (born September 9, 1971) is an American baseball coach. He is the head coach for the Georgia Bulldogs.

== Career ==
Johnson is from Sherwood, Arkansas. He graduated from Sylvan Hills High School in Sherwood and from the University of Arkansas at Monticello in 1994 after playing baseball there for two years.

Johnson began his coaching career as an assistant at Sylvan Hills and Arkansas Baptist High School before landing the head coaching job and winning a state championship at Abundant Life School in Sherwood. He has served as a pitching coach for the Central Arkansas Bears and Dallas Baptist Patriots, before joining the Mississippi State Bulldogs in 2016. He spent one season with Mississippi State before he was hired to coach the Arkansas Razorbacks pitchers. After the 2018 season, the Minnesota Twins of Major League Baseball hired him as their pitching coach.

On June 26, 2022, Johnson was announced as the new pitching coach of the LSU Tigers. Leaving his pitching coach role with the first-place Twins for the same position at the NCAA level was reported as a rare move by many in the media, including Jeff Passan.

== University of Georgia ==
On June 5, 2023, Johnson was hired as the Georgia Bulldogs head baseball coach. In his first season as head coach, he led the Georgia Bulldogs to host an NCAA Super Regional. The 2024 Georgia Bulldogs baseball team finished just one win short of reaching the College World Series. After the season, Charlie Condon was selected third overall in the MLB Draft, with Corey Collins and Fernando Gonzalez also being drafted in 2025 MLB draft.

In his second season, Johnson guided the Bulldogs to their best start in program history, going 32–6 through 38 games, including a series win over then–No. 1 Arkansas.

== Head coaching record ==
Record table
Season	Team	Overall	Conference	Standing	Postseason
Georgia Bulldogs (Southeastern Conference) (2024–present)
2024	Georgia	43–17	17–13	3rd (Eastern)	NCAA Super Regional
2025	Georgia	43–17	18–12	5th	NCAA Regional
2026	Georgia	53–14	23–7	1st	College World Series
Georgia:		139–48 (.743)	58–32 (.644)		
Total:		139–48 (.743)			
National champion Postseason invitational champion Conference regular season champion Conference regular season and conference tournament champion Division regular season champion Division regular season and conference tournament champion Conference tournament champion
