= Joey Volchko =

American baseball player (born 2005)

Chicago White Sox
- Pitcher
- Born: June 21, 2005 (age 21); Torrance, California, U.S.
- Bats: Right Throws: Right
- Stats at Baseball Reference

Joseph Thomas Volchko (born June 21, 2005) is an American professional baseball pitcher in the Chicago White Sox organization. He played college baseball for the Stanford Cardinal and Georgia Bulldogs.

== Amateur career ==
Volchko attended Redwood High School in Visalia, California. As a senior, he pitched to a 0.26 earned run average (ERA) with 67 strikeouts. Following his high school career, he committed to play college baseball at Stanford University.

As a freshman for Stanford in 2024, Volchko totaled a 2–1 win–loss record with a 5.70 ERA and 53 strikeouts in 20 appearances. After the season, he played for the USA Collegiate National Team. In 2024 and 2025, he played collegiate summer baseball with the Cotuit Kettleers of the Cape Cod Baseball League. Volchko returned to Stanford as a sophomore, recording a 6.01 ERA with 56 strikeouts across 70 1/3 innings pitched in 15 starts.

Volchko transferred to the University of Georgia prior to the start of the 2026 season. He emerged as the ace of the Bulldogs' starting pitching staff. Volchko pitched a complete game in Georgia's opening contest of the College World Series, recording 15 strikeouts and leading the Bulldogs to a 7–1 victory over Texas. Volchko finished his lone year at Georgia with an 11–2 record, a 3.68 ERA and 119 strikeouts across 95 1/3 innings and 18 starts.

== Professional career ==
Volchko was considered a top prospect for the 2026 MLB draft. He was selected by the Chicago White Sox in the third round with the 77th overall pick and signed for $1.25 million.
