= Daniel Jackson (baseball) =

American baseball player (born 2004)

- Jackson in 2026

Colorado Rockies
- Catcher
- Born: November 24, 2004 (age 21); Sandy Springs, Georgia, U.S.
- Bats: Right Throws: Right
- Stats at Baseball Reference

Career highlights and awards
- Golden Spikes Award (2026); Dick Howser Trophy (2026); Buster Posey Award (2026); SEC Player of the Year (2026)

Daniel Alexander Jackson (born November 24, 2004) is an American professional baseball catcher in the Colorado Rockies organization. Nicknamed "Rhino", he played college baseball for the Wofford Terriers and Georgia Bulldogs.

== Amateur career ==
Jackson attended North Springs High School in Sandy Springs, Georgia. He committed to play college baseball at Wofford College and played summer collegiate baseball with the Olean Oilers of the New York Collegiate Baseball League in summer 2023.

Jackson appeared in 56 games as a freshman, posting a .357 batting average with 12 home runs and 69 RBI. He was subsequently named the Southern Conference Freshman of the Year and earned Second Team Freshman All-America honors from the National Collegiate Baseball Writers Association. After the season, Jackson transferred to the University of Georgia and again played summer ball - this time with the Traverse City Pit Spitters of the Northwoods League.

As a sophomore with the Bulldogs, he recorded a .240 batting average with 14 home runs and 36 RBI. In 2024 and 2025, he played collegiate summer baseball with the Chatham Anglers of the Cape Cod Baseball League.

In his junior season, Jackson had a breakout year, leading the Southeastern Conference in home runs, RBI, and batting average. After stealing three bases in the second game of a doubleheader against Ole Miss, he became the first player in school history to record 20 home runs and 20 stolen bases in a single season. On May 16, Jackson became the sixth player in NCAA Division I history to record at least 25 home runs and 25 stolen bases in a single season. At the conclusion of the regular season, he was named the SEC Player of the Year. Against Mississippi State, in game two of the Athens Super Regional, Jackson hit a go-ahead home run in the 10th inning, helping Georgia secure an 11–9 victory and advance to the College World Series for the first time since 2008. He finished the season with a .379 batting average, 32 home runs, 87 RBI, and 26 stolen bases. Following his record-setting campaign, Jackson was named the recipient of the Golden Spikes Award, Dick Howser Trophy, and Buster Posey Award.

== Professional career ==
Jackson was selected by the Colorado Rockies with the 37th overall selection of the 2026 Major League Baseball draft. On July 20, 2026, he signed with Colorado for a $2.3 million signing bonus. Jackson made his professional debut that year with the Single-A Fresno Grizzlies.
