= 2026 Alabama Crimson Tide baseball team =

American college baseball season

2026 Alabama Crimson Tide baseball

NCAA Tuscaloosa Regional champions NCAA Tuscaloosa Super Regional champions

College World Series, 0–2
- Conference: Southeastern Conference

Ranking
- Coaches: No. 6
- D1Baseball.com: No. 6
- Record: 42–21 (18–12 SEC)
- Head coach: Rob Vaughn (3rd season)
- Assistant coaches: Mike Morrison (3rd season); Brett Price (8th season)
- Hitting coach: Anthony Papio (3rd season)
- Pitching coach: Jason Jackson (9th season)
- Home stadium: Sewell–Thomas Stadium

2026 Southeastern Conference baseball standings
	Conf.				Overall
Team	W		L	PCT	W		L	PCT
No. 3 Georgia ‍†‍‡‍^{y}	23	–	7	.767	53	–	14	.791
No. 5 Texas ‍‍‍^{y}	19	–	10	.655	46	–	15	.754
No. 17 Texas A&M ‍‍‍^{y}	18	–	11	.621	41	–	16	.719
No. 6 Alabama ‍‍‍^{y}	18	–	12	.600	42	–	21	.667
No. 16 Florida ‍‍‍^{y}	18	–	12	.600	41	–	21	.661
No. 9 Auburn ‍‍‍^{y}	17	–	13	.567	42	–	22	.656
No. 23 Arkansas ‍‍‍^{y}	17	–	13	.567	41	–	22	.651
No. 14 Mississippi State ‍‍‍^{y}	16	–	14	.533	43	–	19	.694
No. 7 Ole Miss ‍‍‍^{y}	15	–	15	.500	41	–	23	.641
Tennessee ‍‍‍^{y}	15	–	15	.500	38	–	22	.633
No. 1 Oklahoma ‍‍‍^{y}	14	–	16	.467	43	–	23	.652
Vanderbilt ‍‍‍	14	–	16	.467	33	–	25	.569
Kentucky ‍‍‍^{y}	13	–	17	.433	33	–	23	.589
LSU ‍‍‍	9	–	21	.300	30	–	28	.517
South Carolina ‍‍‍	7	–	23	.233	22	–	35	.386
Missouri ‍‍‍	6	–	24	.200	24	–	31	.436
† – Conference champion ‡ – Tournament champion y – Invited to the NCAA Tournament; As of June 22, 2026; Rankings from D1Baseball

The 2026 Alabama Crimson Tide baseball team represented the University of Alabama during the 2026 NCAA Division I baseball season. The Crimson Tide played their home games at Sewell–Thomas Stadium in Tuscaloosa, Alabama, as a member of the Southeastern Conference. They were led by third-year head coach Rob Vaughn.

The 2026 season was the first season since 1942 where an Alabama pitcher threw a solo no-hitter. Tyler Fay accomplished this in their 6–0 win against Florida on March 20.

== Previous season ==
The Crimson Tide are coming off a 41–18 (16–14) season. The Tide went 1–1 in the 2025 Southeastern Conference baseball tournament, and earned an at-large berth into the 2025 NCAA Division I baseball tournament, where they were the two-seed in the Hattiesburg Regional. There, the Crimson Tide went 0–2, losing to Miami (FL) and then hosts, Southern Miss.

== Preseason ==
=== SEC coaches poll ===
SEC coaches poll
Predicted finish	Team	Votes (1st place)
1	LSU	231 (9)
2	Texas	214 (1)
3	Mississippi State	205 (4)
4	Arkansas	203 (2)
5	Auburn	175
6	Tennessee	162
7	Florida	156
8	Vanderbilt	151
9	Georgia	133
10	Ole Miss	110
11	Kentucky	99
12	Alabama	87
13	Texas A&M	86
14	Oklahoma	84
15	South Carolina	49
16	Missouri	31

=== Awards and honors ===
==== Preseason SEC awards and honors ====
Preseason All-SEC Team
Player	No.	Position	Class	Designation
Justin Lebron	1	SS	Junior	First Team

==== Preseason All-Americans ====
Preseason All-Americans
Player	Position	Selector	Designation
Justin Lebron	SS	D1Baseball	Second Team
Justin Lebron	SS	Perfect Game	First Team
Justin Lebron	SS	NCBWA	Second Team

== Personnel ==
=== Starters ===
Lineup
Pos.	No.	Player.	Year
C	33	John Lemm	Senior
1B	13	Luke Vaughn	RS Sophomore
2B	4	Brennan Holt	Graduate
3B	32	Jason Torres	Senior
SS	1	Justin Lebron	Junior
LF	18	Justin Osterhouse	Junior
CF	9	Bryce Fowler	RS Senior
RF	10	Brady Neal	Senior
DH	3	Will Plattner	RS Junior

Weekend pitching rotation
Day	No.	Player.	Year
Friday	8	Tyler Fay	RS Junior
Saturday	20	Zane Adams	Junior
Sunday	11	Myles Upchurch	Freshman

=== Roster ===
2026 Alabama Crimson Tide baseball team
Players
Coaches

#	Pos.	Name	B/T	Height	Weight	Year	Home town
1	INF	Justin Lebron	R/R	6 ft 2 in (1.88 m)	190 lb (86 kg)	Jr	Miramar, FL
3	C	Will Plattner	R/R	6 ft 1 in (1.85 m)	205 lb (93 kg)	RS Jr	Springfield, IL
4	UTL	Brennan Holt	L/R	5 ft 9 in (1.75 m)	165 lb (75 kg)	Gr	Baton Rouge, LA
5	UTL	Sam Christiansen	L/L	6 ft 1 in (1.85 m)	212 lb (96 kg)	RS Jr	Mesa, AZ
6	UTL	Evan Taylor	R/R	6 ft 0 in (1.83 m)	195 lb (88 kg)	Fr	Ocean City, NJ
7	LHP	Matthew Heiberger	L/L	6 ft 3 in (1.91 m)	215 lb (98 kg)	Jr	Birmingham, AL
8	RHP	Tyler Fay	R/R	6 ft 5 in (1.96 m)	215 lb (98 kg)	RS Jr	Doniphan, NE
9	OF	Bryce Fowler	L/L	6 ft 2 in (1.88 m)	200 lb (91 kg)	RS Sr	Madison, MS
10	C	Brady Neal	L/R	6 ft 10 in (2.08 m)	200 lb (91 kg)	Sr	Tallahassee, FL
11	RHP	Myles Upchurch	R/R	6 ft 4 in (1.93 m)	230 lb (104 kg)	Fr	Odenton, MD
12	RHP	JT Blackwood	R/R	6 ft 2 in (1.88 m)	205 lb (93 kg)	Sr	Cullman, AL
13	C	Luke Vaughn	R/R	6 ft 2 in (1.88 m)	200 lb (91 kg)	RS So	Cincinnati, OH
14	OF	Peyton Steele	R/R	6 ft 1 in (1.85 m)	200 lb (91 kg)	So	Decatur, AL
15	OF	Coleman Mizell	L/L	6 ft 3 in (1.91 m)	230 lb (104 kg)	Jr	Hartselle, AL
16	RHP	Bobby Alcock	R/R	6 ft 5 in (1.96 m)	230 lb (104 kg)	Gr	Lynn, MA
17	OF	Logen Devenport	R/R	6 ft 0 in (1.83 m)	210 lb (95 kg)	Sr	Franklin, IN
18	INF	Justin Osterhouse	L/R	6 ft 1 in (1.85 m)	205 lb (93 kg)	Jr	Grand Rapids, MI
19	UTL	Caleb Barnett	R/R	6 ft 6 in (1.98 m)	220 lb (100 kg)	Fr	Mountain Brook, AL
20	LHP	Zane Adams	L/L	6 ft 4 in (1.93 m)	205 lb (93 kg)	Jr	Porter, TX
21	INF	Andrew Purdy	L/R	6 ft 2 in (1.88 m)	210 lb (95 kg)	Fr	Cartersville, GA
22	INF	Will Rhine	S/R	6 ft 3 in (1.91 m)	205 lb (93 kg)	Fr	Bel Air, MD
23	OF	Chase Kroberger	R/R	6 ft 0 in (1.83 m)	190 lb (86 kg)	Fr	Moorestown, NJ
24	LHP	Tate Robertson	L/L	6 ft 0 in (1.83 m)	175 lb (79 kg)	RS Sr	Tuscaloosa, AL
26	C	Zack Johnson	R/R	6 ft 1 in (1.85 m)	20 lb (9 kg)	Fr	Madison, AL
27	LHP	Luke Smyers	L/L	6 ft 3 in (1.91 m)	215 lb (98 kg)	Fr	Henrico, VA
28	RHP	Sam Mitchell	R/R	6 ft 7 in (2.01 m)	220 lb (100 kg)	RS So	Madison, AL
29	INF	Jojo Williamson	L/R	5 ft 8 in (1.73 m)	175 lb (79 kg)	So	Hartselle, AL
30	RHP	Anthony Pesci	L/R	6 ft 4 in (1.93 m)	210 lb (95 kg)	So	Commerce Township, MI
31	INF	Jon Young Jr.	L/R	6 ft 1 in (1.85 m)	190 lb (86 kg)	So	Cherry Hill, NJ
32	INF	Jason Torres	R/R	6 ft 1 in (1.85 m)	215 lb (98 kg)	Sr	Hialeah, FL
33	C	John Lemm	L/R	6 ft 3 in (1.91 m)	230 lb (104 kg)	Sr	Brisbane, QLD, AUS
35	RHP	Owen Sarna	R/R	6 ft 1 in (1.85 m)	195 lb (88 kg)	Jr	Rock Hill, SC
36	RHP	Hagan Banks	R/R	6 ft 4 in (1.93 m)	210 lb (95 kg)	RS Sr	Plainville, GA
37	RHP	Kaden Humphrey	R/R	6 ft 1 in (1.85 m)	190 lb (86 kg)	Sr	Naples, FL
38	RHP	Zach Kittrell	R/R	6 ft 0 in (1.83 m)	195 lb (88 kg)	Sr	Mobile, AL
39	LHP	Ross Lindsey	L/L	6 ft 1 in (1.85 m)	210 lb (95 kg)	Fr	Natchitoches, LA
42	OF	Eric Hines	R/R	6 ft 3 in (1.91 m)	230 lb (104 kg)	Fr	Tuscaloosa, AL
43	RHP	Jack Ketchum	R/R	6 ft 3 in (1.91 m)	210 lb (95 kg)	So	West Point, MS
44	LHP	Evan Steckmesser	L/L	6 ft 1 in (1.85 m)	185 lb (84 kg)	Gr	Huntsville, AL
45	UTL	Joe Chiarodo	R/R	5 ft 11 in (1.8 m)	200 lb (91 kg)	Fr	Edwardsville, IL
48	LHP	Ashton Crowther	L/L	6 ft 3 in (1.91 m)	215 lb (98 kg)	RS Jr	Trinity, FL
50	LHP	Connor Lehman	L/L	6 ft 2 in (1.88 m)	215 lb (98 kg)	So	Indian Mound, TN
99	RHP	Austin Morris	R/R	6 ft 4 in (1.93 m)	215 lb (98 kg)	RS Jr	Warrior, AL

Head coach

Rob Vaughn

Assistant coach(es)

Mike Morrison
Brett Price
Anthony Papio
Jason Jackson

Legend

- (C) Team captain
- (S) Suspended
- (I) Ineligible
- Injured
- Current redshirt

Roster
Last update: April 8, 2026

== Game log ==
2026 Alabama Crimson Tide baseball game log (42–21)
Regular season: 37–18 (Home: 23–6; Away: 10–11; Neutral: 4–1)

February: 9–2 (Home: 6–1; Away: 1–1; Neutral: 2–0)
Date	TV	Opponent	Rank	Stadium	Score	Win	Loss	Save	Attendance	Overall	SEC
February 13	SECN+	Washington State*		Sewell–Thomas Stadium; Tuscaloosa, AL	**L** 4–8	Meyers (1–0)	**Fay** (0–1)	None	4,888	1–0	—
February 14 (Note: Part of a doubleheader.)	SECN+	Washington State*		Sewell–Thomas Stadium	**W** 8–1	**Adams** (1–0)	Lewis (0–1)	None	4,378	1–1	—
February 14	SECN+	Washington State*		Sewell–Thomas Stadium	**W** 11–1^{7}	**Upchurch** (1–0)	Smith (0–1)	None	4,378	2–1	—
February 17	ESPN+	at Samford*		Joe Lee Griffin Stadium; Birmingham, AL	**W** 3–2	**Morris** (1–0)	Malone (0–1)	**Banks** (1)	1,613	3–1	—
February 18	SECN+	Alabama State*		Sewell–Thomas Stadium	**W** 2–1	**Alcock** (1–0)	Baptist (0–1)	**Heiberger** (1)	3,513	4–1	—
February 20	SECN+	Rhode Island*		Sewell–Thomas Stadium	**W** 19–4^{7}	**Fay** (1–1)	Sabbath (0–2)	None	4,598	5–1	—
February 21	SECN+	Rhode Island*		Sewell–Thomas Stadium	**W** 8–5	**Adams** (2–0)	Johnston (0–2)	**Steckmesser** (1)	4,909	6–1	—
February 21	SECN+	Rhode Island*		Sewell–Thomas Stadium	**W** 11–1^{8}	**Upchurch** (2–0)	Cullen (0–2)	None	4,909	7–1	—
February 24	ESPN+	at No. 12 Southern Miss*		Pete Taylor Park; Hattiesburg, MS	**L** 4–14^{8}	Littleton (1–0)	**Blackwood** (1–1)	None	5,538	7–2	—
Frisco College Baseball Classic
February 27		vs. Iowa*		Riders Field; Frisco, TX	**W** 12–2	**Fay** (2–1)	Guerin (1–2)	None	3,350	8–2	—
February 28		vs. No. 19 Oregon State*		Riders Field	**W** 8–7	**Heiberger** (1–0)	Kleinschmit (0–2)	**Banks** (2)	5,771	9–2	—

March: 14–5 (Home: 11–0; Away: 2–4; Neutral: 1–1)
Date	TV	Opponent	Rank	Stadium	Score	Win	Loss	Save	Attendance	Overall	SEC
Frisco College Baseball Classic
March 1		vs. Houston*		Riders Field	**L** 2–8	Hoffman (1–0)	**Upchurch** (2–1)	None	4,802	9–3	—
March 3	SECN+	No. 25 Jacksonville State*		Sewell–Thomas Stadium	**W** 6–5	**Crowther** (1–0)	Cantrell (0–1)	**Banks** (3)	4,659	10–3	—
March 4	ESPN+	at Alabama State*		Wheeler–Watkins Ballpark; Montgomery, AL	**W** 13–4	**Chiarodo** (1–0)	Baptist (0–3)	None	878	11–3	—
March 6	SECN+	North Florida*		Sewell–Thomas Stadium	**W** 7–2	**Fay** (3–1)	Stone (0–1)	None	3,408	12–3	—
March 7	SECN+	North Florida*		Sewell–Thomas Stadium	**W** 9–3	**Adams** (3–0)	Hendry (0–3)	None	3,573	13–3	—
March 8	SECN+	North Florida*		Sewell–Thomas Stadium	**W** 12–2^{7}	**Upchurch** (3–1)	Diminio (0–1)	None	3,316	14–3	—
March 10	SECN+	Troy*		Sewell–Thomas Stadium	**W** 7–3	**Alcock** (2–0)	Cartron (0–1)	None	4,423	15–3	—
March 13	SECN+	at No. 21 Kentucky		Kentucky Proud Park; Lexington, KY	**L** 4–7	Jelkin (4–0)	**Fay** (3–2)	Bennett (4)	2,717	15–4	0–1
March 14	SECN+	at No. 21 Kentucky		Kentucky Proud Park	**L** 7–8	Skelding (2–0)	**Adams** (3–1)	Bennett (5)	3,178	15–5	0–2
March 15	SECN+	at No. 21 Kentucky		Kentucky Proud Park	**L** 4–6	Harris (3–1)	**Upchurch** (3–2)	Adcock (1)	3,046	15–6	0–3
March 17	ESPN+	at South Alabama*		Eddie Stanky Field; Mobile, AL	**L** 3–6	Stevens (2–1)	**Crowther** (1–1)	None	2,608	15–7	—
March 20	SECN+	No. 18 Florida		Sewell–Thomas Stadium	**W** 6–0	**Fay** (4–2)	Peterson (1–1)	None	3,610	16–7	1–3
March 21	SECN+	No. 18 Florida		Sewell–Thomas Stadium	**W** 8–4	**Adams** (4–1)	King (3–2)	None	3,875	17–7	2–3
March 22	SECN	No. 18 Florida		Sewell–Thomas Stadium	**W** 14–7	**Crowther** (2–1)	Sandefer (0–1)	None	3,753	18–7	3–3
March 24		vs. Austin Peay*	No. 23	Toyota Field; Madison, AL	**W** 6–2	**Lehman** (1–0)	Cox (0–3)	None	2,968	19–7	—
Iron Series
March 27	SECN+	No. 5 Auburn	No. 23	Sewell–Thomas Stadium	**W** 11–1^{8}	**Fay** (5–2)	Marciano (3–1)	None	4,862	20–7	4–3
March 28	SECN	No. 5 Auburn	No. 23	Sewell–Thomas Stadium	**W** 3–2	**Banks** (1–0)	Hetzler (3–1)	None	5,800	21–7	5–3
March 29	SECN+	No. 5 Auburn	No. 23	Sewell–Thomas Stadium	**W** 3–1	**Heiberger** (2–0)	Brewer (1–2)	**Banks** (4)	5,800	22–7	6–3
March 31	ESPN+	at No. 24 Jacksonville State*	No. 17	Rudy Abbott Field; Jacksonville, AL	**W** 4–3	**Steckmesser** (1–0)	Hutto (2–2)	None	1,852	23–7	—

April: 7–9 (Home: 1–4; Away: 4–5; Neutral: 1–0)
Date	TV	Opponent	Rank	Stadium	Score	Win	Loss	Save	Attendance	Overall	SEC
April 2	SECN+	at No. 11 Oklahoma	No. 17	L. Dale Mitchell Baseball Park; Norman, OK	**W** 10–7	**Fay** (6–2)	Mercurius (5–3)	**Heiberger** (2)	3,895	24–7	7–3
April 3	SECN+	at No. 11 Oklahoma	No. 17	L. Dale Mitchell Baseball Park	**L** 2–4	Johnson (4–1)	**Adams** (4–2)	Leon (1)	2,571	24–8	7–4
April 4	SECN+	at No. 11 Oklahoma	No. 17	L. Dale Mitchell Baseball Park	**W** 3–2	**Upchurch** (4–2)	Collier (0–1)	**Banks** (5)	3,906	25–8	8–4
April 7	SECN+	Samford*	No. 8	Sewell–Thomas Stadium	**W** 16–2^{7}	**Blackwood** (1–1)	Andre (1–1)	None	5,184	26–8	—
April 10	SECN+	No. 22 Arkansas	No. 8	Sewell–Thomas Stadium	**L** 5–7	Gaeckle (4–3)	**Heiberger** (2–1)	Coil (2)	5,075	26–9	8–5
April 11	SECN	No. 22 Arkansas	No. 8	Sewell–Thomas Stadium	**L** 6–15	Fisher (3–4)	**Mitchell** (0–1)	None	5,249	26–10	8–6
April 12	SECN+	No. 22 Arkansas	No. 8	Sewell–Thomas Stadium	**L** 2–3	Gaeckle (5–3)	**Crowther** (2–2)	McElvain (2)	4,235	26–11	8–7
April 14	ESPN+	vs. UAB*	No. 11	Regions Field; Birmingham, AL	**W** 12–6	**Mitchell** (1–1)	Helmers (1–2)	None	2,149	27–11	—
April 17	SECN+	at No. 4 Texas	No. 11	Disch–Falk Field; Austin, TX	**L** 2–10	Volantis (5–0)	**Fay** (6–3)	Cozart (5)	7,547	27–12	8–8
April 18	SECN+	at No. 4 Texas	No. 11	Disch–Falk Field	**L** 1–3	Leffew (3–1)	**Heiberger** (2–2)	Cozart (6)	6,878	27–13	8–9
April 19	SECN+	at No. 4 Texas	No. 11	Disch–Falk Field	**W** 2–1	**Upchurch** (5–2)	Harrison (4–2)	**Crowther** (1)	7,223	28–13	9–9
April 21	SECN+	UAB*	No. 13	Sewell–Thomas Stadium	**L** 2–11	Miller (3–0)	**Smyers** (0–1)	House (1)	4,849	28–14	—
Third Saturday in April
April 23	ESPN2	at Tennessee	No. 13	Lindsey Nelson Stadium; Knoxville, TN	**W** 12–8	**Fay** (7–3)	Mack (3–4)	None	6,485	29–14	10–9
April 24	SECN+	at Tennessee	No. 13	Lindsey Nelson Stadium	**L** 0–10^{8}	Kuhns (3–3)	**Adams** (4–3)	None	6,391	29–15	10–10
April 24	SECN+	at Tennessee	No. 13	Lindsey Nelson Stadium	**L** 4–11	Blanco (5–2)	**Upchurch** (5–3)	None	7,051	29–16	10–11
April 30	ESPNU	Vanderbilt	No. 24	Sewell–Thomas Stadium	**W** 5–4	**Heiberger** (3–2)	Baird (0–4)	None	3,639	30–16	11–11

May: 7–2 (Home: 4–1; Away: 3–1; Neutral: 0–0)
Date	TV	Opponent	Rank	Stadium	Score	Win	Loss	Save	Attendance	Overall	SEC
May 1	SECN+	Vanderbilt	No. 24	Sewell–Thomas Stadium	**W** 5–0	**Adams** (5–3)	Stillman (2–2)	**Crowther** (2)	3,469	31–16	12–11
May 2	SECN+	Vanderbilt	No. 24	Sewell–Thomas Stadium	**W** 8–5	**Upchurch** (6–3)	Nadeau (1–3)	**Banks** (6)	4,258	32–16	13–11
May 5	ESPN+	at Troy*	No. 19	Riddle–Pace Field; Troy, AL	**L** 1–6	Dill (3–2)	**Lehman** (1–1)	Thigpen (1)	3,982	32–17	—
May 8	SECN	at South Carolina	No. 19	Founders Park; Columbia, SC	**W** 8–3	**Fay** (8–3)	Phillips (3–7)	None	6,368	33–17	14–11
May 9	SECN	at South Carolina	No. 19	Founders Park	**W** 9–6	**Adams** (6–3)	Stone (5–4)	None	6,308	34–17	15–11
May 10	SECN+	at South Carolina	No. 19	Founders Park	**W** 7–6	**Upchurch** (7–3)	Valentin (1–4)	**Heiberger** (3)	6,120	35–17	16–11
May 14	SECN+	No. 15 Ole Miss	No. 18	Sewell–Thomas Stadium	**W** 5–4	**Fay** (9–3)	Elliott (5–3)	**Heiberger** (4)	3,700	36–17	17–11
May 15	SECN	No. 15 Ole Miss	No. 18	Sewell–Thomas Stadium	**L** 0–9	Rabe (4–3)	**Adams** (6–4)	Robertson (1)	4,180	36–18	17–12
May 16	SECN+	No. 15 Ole Miss	No. 18	Sewell–Thomas Stadium	**W** 6–2	**Upchurch** (8–3)	Townsend (5–3)	None	4,315	37–18	18–12

Postseason: 5–3 (Home: 5–0; Away: 0–0; Neutral: 0–3)

SEC tournament: 0–1 (Home: 0–0; Away: 0–0; Neutral: 0–1)
Date	TV	Opponent	Rank	Stadium	Score	Win	Loss	Save	Attendance	Overall	SECT Record
May 21	SECN	vs. (5); No. 18 Florida	(4); No. 15	Hoover Metropolitan Stadium; Hoover, AL	**L** 3–13^{8}	Peterson (3–5)	**Fay** (9–4)	None	11,146	37–19	0–1

Tuscaloosa Regional: 3–0 (Home: 3–0; Away: 0–0; Neutral: 0–0)
Date	TV	Opponent	Rank	Stadium	Score	Win	Loss	Save	Attendance	Overall	Regional Record
May 29	SECN	(4) Alabama State	(1); No. 16	Sewell–Thomas Stadium	**W** 21–3	**Fay** (10–4)	Laboy (9–6)	None	4,466	38–19	1–0
May 30	ESPN+	(3) USC Upstate	(1); No. 16	Sewell–Thomas Stadium	**W** 7–5	**Adams** (7–4)	Land (1–2)	**Heiberger** (5)	4,089	39–19	2–0
May 31	ESPN+	(2); No. 19 Oklahoma State	(1); No. 16	Sewell–Thomas Stadium	**W** 9–7^{11}	**Banks** (2–0)	Pesca (7–5)	None	3,768	40–19	3–0

Tuscaloosa Super Regional: 2–0 (Home: 2–0; Away: 0–0; Neutral: 0–0)
Date	TV	Opponent	Rank	Stadium	Score	Win	Loss	Save	Attendance	Overall	Super Regional Record
June 6	ESPN2	St. John's	(7); No. 16	Sewell–Thomas Stadium	**W** 8–0	**Fay** (11–4)	O'Leary (8–5)	None	7,573	41–19	1–0
June 8	ESPN2	St. John's	(7); No. 16	Sewell–Thomas Stadium	**W** 7–2	**Adams** (8–4)	Chaffee (7–5)	None	6,738	42–19	2–0

Men's College World Series: 0–2 (Home: 0–0; Away: 0–0; Neutral: 0–2)
Date	TV	Opponent	Rank	Stadium	Score	Win	Loss	Save	Attendance	Overall	MCWS Record
June 13	ESPN	vs. Oklahoma	(7); No. 16	Charles Schwab Field; Omaha, NE	**L** 0–9	Rager (6–3)	**Fay** (11–5)	None	24,579	42–20	0–1
June 15	ESPN	vs. (6); No. 6 Texas	(7); No. 16	Charles Schwab Field	**L** 2–14	Riojas (6–2)	**Adams** (8–5)	None	22,687	42–21	0–2

Legend: = Win = Loss = Canceled
Bold = Alabama team member
Rankings are based on the team's current ranking in the D1Baseball poll.

Schedule Notes

=== Record vs. conference opponent ===
Blank are not scheduled. Blue are home games, otherwise away.

2026 SEC baseball records Source: 2026 SEC baseball game results, 2026 SEC baseball schedule
Tm	W–L	ALA	ARK	AUB	FLA	UGA	KEN	LSU	MSU	MIZ	OKL	OMS	SCA	TEN	TEX	TAM	VAN	Tm	SR	SW
ALA	18–12		0–3	3–0	3–0	.	0–3	.	.	.	2–1	2–1	3–0	1–2	1–2	.	3–0	ALA	6–4	4–2
ARK	17–13	3–0		1–2	0–3	1–2	2–1	.	2–1	2–1	2–1	2–1	2–1	.	.	.	.	ARK	7–3	1–1
AUB	17–13	0–3	2–1		2–1	1–2	2–1	.	2–1	3–0	2–1	.	.	.	1–2	2–1	.	AUB	7–3	1–1
FLA	18–12	0–3	3–0	1–2		2–1	2–1	3–0	.	.	2–1	1–2	3–0	.	.	1–2	.	FLA	6–4	3–1
UGA	23–7	.	2–1	2–1	1–2		.	3–0	3–0	3–0	.	2–1	3–0	2–1	.	2–1	.	UGA	9–1	4–0
KEN	13–17	3–0	1–2	1–2	1–2	.		1–2	.	1–2	.	1–2	1–2	2–1	.	.	1–2	KEN	2–8	1–0
LSU	9–21	.	.	.	0–3	0–3	2–1		0–3	.	1–2	0–3	3–0	2–1	.	0–3	1–2	LSU	3–7	1–5
MSU	16–14	.	1–2	1–2	.	0–3	.	3–0		.	.	3–0	3–0	0–3	1–2	1–2	3–0	MSU	4–6	4–2
MIZ	6–24	.	1–2	0–3	.	0–3	2–1	.	.		0–3	.	0–3	1–2	0–3	0–3	2–1	MIZ	2–8	0–6
OKL	14–16	1–2	1–2	1–2	1–2	.	.	2–1	.	3–0		.	.	1–2	0–3	2–1	2–1	OKL	4–6	1–1
OMS	15–15	1–2	1–2	.	2–1	1–2	2–1	3–0	0–3	.	.		.	2–1	1–2	2–1	.	OMS	5–5	1–1
SCA	7–23	0–3	1–2	.	0–3	0–3	2–1	0–3	0–3	3–0	.	.		.	1–2	.	0–3	SCA	2–8	1–6
TEN	15–15	2–1	.	.	.	1–2	1–2	1–2	3–0	2–1	2–1	1–2	.		2–1	.	0–3	TEN	5–5	1–1
TEX	19–10	2–1	.	2–1	.	.	.	.	2–1	3–0	3–0	2–1	2–1	1–2		0–2	2–1	TEX	8–2	2–0
TAM	18–11	.	.	1–2	2–1	1–2	.	3–0	2–1	3–0	1–2	1–2	.	.	2–0		2–1	TAM	6–4	2–0
VAN	14–16	0–3	.	.	.	.	2–1	2–1	0–3	1–2	1–2	.	3–0	3–0	1–2	1–2		VAN	4–6	2–2
Tm	W–L	ALA	ARK	AUB	FLA	UGA	KEN	LSU	MSU	MIZ	OKL	OMS	SCA	TEN	TEX	TAM	VAN	Team	SR	SW

Updated for entire regular season. Texas at Texas A&M, one game cancelled.
Tie breakers: ALA>FLA hd to hd, AUB>ARK hd to hd, OMS>TEN hd to hd, OKL>VAN hd to hd.

== Awards and honors ==
=== SEC awards and honors ===
SEC Weekly honors
Honors	Player	Position	Date Awarded	Ref.
Player of the Week	Brady Neal	C	March 23, 2026	
Pitcher of the Week	Tyler Fay	P	March 23, 2026	

=== National awards and honors ===
National Weekly honors
Honors	Player	Position	Date Awarded	Ref.
Perfect Game USA Freshman of the Week	Myles Upchurch (Note: Awarded Perfect Game USA's Co-Freshman of the Week along with Texas' Sam Cozart.)	P	March 10, 2026	
Perfect Game USA Pitcher of the Week	Tyler Fay	P	March 31, 2026	
Perfect Game USA Freshman of the Week	Myles Upchurch (Note: Awarded Perfect Game USA's Co-Freshman of the Week along with Texas' Sam Cozart.)	P	March 31, 2026	
Perfect Game USA Midseason All-American	Justin Lebron	SS	April 1, 2026	
Perfect Game USA Midseason Freshman All-American	Myles Upchurch	P	April 1, 2026	

Award notes:

== Statistics ==
=== Team batting ===
Team	AVG	OPS	GP	GS	AB	R	H	2B	3B	HR	RBI	TB	SLG	BB	HBP	SO	GDP	OBP	SF	SH	SB
Alabama	.270	.863	34	34	1086	250	293	59	5	46	231	500	.460	188	66	295	13	.403	17	10	65
Opponents	.225	.647	34	34	1069	135	241	35	1	25	127	353	.330	115	31	300	19	.317	6	15	30

=== Team pitching ===
Team	IP	H	R	ER	BB	SO	SV	ERA
Alabama	603.1	545	311	287	245	606	10	4.28
Opponents	588	753	541	491	319	545	11	7.52

=== Individual batting ===
Note: leaders must meet the minimum requirement of 2 PA/G and 75% of games played

Player	AVG	OPS	GP	GS	AB	R	H	2B	3B	HR	RBI	TB	SLG	BB	HBP	SO	GDP	OBP	SF	SH	SB
Bryce Fowler	.357	1.018	33	33	126	33	45	8	0	5	26	68	.540	24	6	39	0	.478	1	0	14
Brady Neal	.357	1.081	34	31	112	27	40	9	1	6	34	69	.616	20	6	23	1	.465	4	2	4
John Lemm	.312	.952	32	30	109	27	34	7	1	5	19	58	.532	17	4	29	0	.420	1	1	1
Brennan Holt	.284	.840	34	34	102	24	29	6	1	1	14	40	.392	21	10	35	2	.448	1	1	12
Justin Lebron	.267	.955	34	34	131	38	35	5	0	11	28	73	.557	20	9	30	2	.398	1	0	25
Jason Torres	.262	.817	34	34	122	18	32	7	1	4	34	53	.434	22	3	30	3	.383	2	3	0
Justin Osterhouse	.230	.772	31	27	87	18	20	4	0	3	15	33	.379	18	6	20	1	.393	1	1	7
Luke Vaughn	.221	.871	32	30	95	25	21	6	0	6	24	45	.474	22	7	22	1	.397	2	1	0
Peyton Steele	.198	.552	25	22	81	10	16	3	1	1	16	24	.296	6	1	27	1	.256	2	0	0
Will Plattner	.140	.528	21	16	57	8	8	3	0	1	8	14	.246	8	4	16	1	.282	2	1	1
Eric Hines	.350	1.085	10	5	20	6	7	0	0	2	4	13	.650	1	2	5	0	.435	0	0	0
Andrew Purdy	.192	.631	14	7	26	9	5	1	0	0	5	6	.231	4	5	11	1	.400	0	0	0
Chase Kroberger	.091	.595	7	2	11	4	1	0	0	1	3	4	.364	2	0	5	0	.231	0	0	1
Evan Taylor	.000	.250	4	0	3	1	0	0	0	0	0	0	.000	0	1	0	0	.250	0	0	0
Jojo Williamson	.000	.400	7	1	3	2	0	0	0	0	0	0	.000	1	1	2	0	.400	0	0	0
Joe Chiarodo	.000	.000	4	1	1	0	0	0	0	0	0	0	.000	0	0	1	0	.000	0	0	0
Caleb Barnett	.000	1.000	4	0	0	0	0	0	0	0	1	0	.000	2	1	0	0	1.000	0	0	0

=== Individual pitching ===
Note: leaders must meet the minimum requirement of 1 IP/G

Player	ERA	WHIP	W	L	GP	GS	CG	SHO	SV	IP	H	R	ER	BB	SO	2B	3B	HR	AB	B/AVG	WP	HBP	BK	SFA	SHA

== Rankings ==
Ranking movements Legend: ██ Increase in ranking ██ Decrease in ranking — = Not ranked RV = Received votes
	Week																	
Poll	Pre	1	2	3	4	5	6	7	8	9	10	11	12	13	14	15	16	Final
Coaches'	—	—*	—	RV	RV	RV	23	17	9	13	15	23	19	16	15	16	16*	6
Baseball America	—	—	—	—	—	—	22	10	8	16	19	25	22	19	15	15*	15*	6
NCBWA†	—	—	RV	RV	RV	RV	25	17	9	16	15	24	18	18	15	15*	9	7
D1Baseball	—	—	—	—	—	—	—	16	8	11	13	24	19	18	15	16	16*	6
Perfect Game	—	—	—	—	RV	RV	RV	15	7	8	15	21	17	14	13	13*	13*	7

† NCBWA ranks 30 teams in their preseason poll, but only ranks 25 teams weekly during the season.
* A new poll was not released for this week, so for comparison purposes, the previous week's ranking is inserted in this week's slot.
