= 2026 Florida Gators baseball team =

Season of University of Florida baseball team

2026 Florida Gators baseball

NCAA Gainesville Regional, 2–2
- Conference: Southeastern Conference

Ranking
- Coaches: No. 19
- D1Baseball.com: No. 16
- Record: 41–21 (18–12 SEC)
- Head coach: Kevin O'Sullivan (19th season)
- Assistant coaches: Chuck Jeroloman; Taylor Black; David Kopp
- Home stadium: Condron Ballpark

2026 Southeastern Conference baseball standings
	Conf.				Overall
Team	W		L	PCT	W		L	PCT
No. 3 Georgia ‍†‍‡‍^{y}	23	–	7	.767	53	–	14	.791
No. 5 Texas ‍‍‍^{y}	19	–	10	.655	46	–	15	.754
No. 17 Texas A&M ‍‍‍^{y}	18	–	11	.621	41	–	16	.719
No. 6 Alabama ‍‍‍^{y}	18	–	12	.600	42	–	21	.667
No. 16 Florida ‍‍‍^{y}	18	–	12	.600	41	–	21	.661
No. 9 Auburn ‍‍‍^{y}	17	–	13	.567	42	–	22	.656
No. 23 Arkansas ‍‍‍^{y}	17	–	13	.567	41	–	22	.651
No. 14 Mississippi State ‍‍‍^{y}	16	–	14	.533	43	–	19	.694
No. 7 Ole Miss ‍‍‍^{y}	15	–	15	.500	41	–	23	.641
Tennessee ‍‍‍^{y}	15	–	15	.500	38	–	22	.633
No. 1 Oklahoma ‍‍‍^{y}	14	–	16	.467	43	–	23	.652
Vanderbilt ‍‍‍	14	–	16	.467	33	–	25	.569
Kentucky ‍‍‍^{y}	13	–	17	.433	33	–	23	.589
LSU ‍‍‍	9	–	21	.300	30	–	28	.517
South Carolina ‍‍‍	7	–	23	.233	22	–	35	.386
Missouri ‍‍‍	6	–	24	.200	24	–	31	.436
† – Conference champion ‡ – Tournament champion y – Invited to the NCAA Tournament; As of June 22, 2026; Rankings from D1Baseball

The 2026 Florida Gators baseball team represented the University of Florida in the sport of college baseball during the 2026 NCAA Division I baseball season. Florida competed in the Southeastern Conference (SEC) and played their home games at Condron Ballpark on the university's Gainesville, Florida campus. The team was coached by Kevin O'Sullivan in his nineteenth season as Florida's head coach.

== Previous season ==
The Gators finished the 2025 season with a record of 15–15 in conference play and 39–22 overall record for 10th place in the SEC. As the 10th seed in the SEC Tournament, they beat 15th seed South Carolina in the first round, but lost to Ole Miss in the second round. They got an at-large bid to the Auburn Super Regional in the NCAA Tournament, where they lost to East Carolina, beat Fairfield, but lost and ended their tournament run to East Carolina.

== Preseason ==
=== Preseason SEC awards and honors ===
Preseason All-SEC First Team
Player	No.	Position	Class
Liam Peterson	12	P	Junior
Luke McNeillie	9	P	Junior

Preseason All-SEC Second Team
Player	No.	Position	Class
Brendan Lawson	11	3B	Sophomore

=== Coaches poll ===
SEC Coaches' Poll
Predicted finish	Team	Points
1	LSU	231 (9)
2	Texas	214 (1)
3	Mississippi State	205 (4)
4	Arkansas	203 (2)
5	Auburn	175
6	Tennessee	162
7	Florida	156
8	Vanderbilt	151
9	Georgia	133
10	Ole Miss	110
11	Kentucky	99
12	Alabama	97
13	Texas A&M	86
14	Oklahoma	84
15	South Carolina	49
16	Missouri	31

== Roster ==
2026 Florida Gators roster
Pitchers	Catchers Infielders	Outfielders	Two way players

=== Coaches ===
2026 Florida Gators baseball coaching staff
- Kevin O'Sullivan – head coach – 19th season
- Chuck Jeroloman – associate head coach – 7th season
- Taylor Black – assistant coach – 4th season
- David Kopp – pitching coach – 5th season

Note: Season counter accounts for all stints at Florida.

== Personnel ==
=== Starters ===
Opening night lineup
Pos.	No.	Player.	Year
--			
--			
--			
--			
--			
--			
--			
--			
--			

Weekend pitching rotation
Day	No.	Player.	Year
Friday			
Saturday			
Sunday			

== Schedule ==
Legend
	Florida win
	Florida loss
	Postponement
**Bold**	Florida team member

2026 Florida Gators baseball game log (41–21)
Regular Season (37–18)

February (11–1)
Date	Opponent	Rank	Stadium Site	Score	Win	Loss	Save	Attendance	Overall Record	SEC Record
February 13	UAB	No. 13	Condron Ballpark; Gainesville, FL	**L** 7–9^{10}	R. Miller (1–0)	**J. Barberi** (0–1)	None	7,276	0–1	–
February 14 (1)	UAB	No. 13	Condron Ballpark	**W** 11–0^{7}	**A. King** (1–0)	B. Shelton (0–1)	None	6,721	1–1	–
February 14 (2)^{[a]}	UAB	No. 13	Condron Ballpark	**W** 6–1	**C. Walls** (1–0)	C. Ingram (0–1)	None	6,721	2–1	–
February 17	at Stetson	No. 12	Conrad Park; DeLand, FL	**W** 12–2^{7}	**B. Barlow** (1–0)	Z. Coppersmith (0–1)	**C. McDonald** (1)	2,436	3–1	–
February 18	Stetson	No. 12	Condron Ballpark	**W** 9–3	**L. McNeillie** (1–0)	B. Walker (0–1)	None	5,957	4–1	–
February 20	Kennesaw State	No. 12	Condron Ballpark	**W** 9–3	**L. Peterson** (1–0)	C. McMullen (0–1)	None	7,195	5–1	–
February 21	Kennesaw State	No. 12	Condron Ballpark	**W** 11–0^{7}	**A. King** (2–0)	T. Bayer (0–1)	None	7,783	6–1	–
February 21	Kennesaw State	No. 12	Condron Ballpark	**W** 12–9	**J. Barberi** (1–1)	R. Renfroe (0–1)	None	6,707	7–1	–
February 24	FIU	No. 10	Condron Ballpark	**W** 17–11	**R. Reeth** (1–0)	E. Sier (2–1)	None	5,969	8–1	–
February 25	FIU	No. 10	Condron Ballpark	**W** 11–4	**S. Sandford** (1–0)	T. Cameron (0–3)	None	5,925	9–1	–
February 27	at No. 17 Miami (FL); Rivalry	No. 10	Alex Rodriguez Park; Coral Gables, FL	**W** 7–2	**J. Barberi** (2–1)	A. Ciscar (2–1)	None	3,555	10–1	–
February 28	at No. 17 Miami (FL); Rivalry	No. 10	Alex Rodriguez Park	**W** 8–4	**R. Reeth** (2–0)	R. Evans (2–1)	None	3,555	11–1	–
^{^[a]}Rescheduled from February 15 as a single-admission doubleheader due to the threat of severe weather.

March (12–6)
Date	Opponent	Rank	Stadium Site	Score	Win	Loss	Save	Attendance	Overall Record	SEC Record
March 1	at No. 17 Miami (FL); Rivalry	No. 10	Alex Rodriguez Park	Canceled (rain)						
March 3	Florida Atlantic	No. 9	Condron Ballpark	**W** 4–0	**C. Walls** (2–0)	K. Adetuyi (1–1)	None	5,918	12–1	–
March 4	Florida A&M	No. 9	Condron Ballpark	**W** 7–5	**C. McDonald** (1–0)	C. Lincoln (0–1)	**J. Whritenour** (1)	6,085	13–1	–
March 6	High Point	No. 9	Condron Ballpark	**L** 2–7	W. Walton (2–1)	**J. Barberi** (2–2)	None	6,607	13–2	–
March 7	High Point	No. 9	Condron Ballpark	**L** 2–6	T. Brachbill (4–0)	**A. King** (2–1)	None	7,683	13–3	–
March 8	High Point	No. 9	Condron Ballpark	**W** 12–11	**J. Whritenour** (1–0)	D. Hitt (0–1)	None	4,774	14–3	–
March 10	No. 20 Florida State; Rivalry	No. 23	Condron Ballpark	**W** 6–3	**L. McNeillie** (2–0)	K. Mebil (1–1)	**J. Whritenour** (2)	6,548	15–3	–
March 13	South Carolina	No. 23	Condron Ballpark	**W** 1–0^{10}	**J. Whritenour** (2–0)	B. Stone (2–1)	None	5,255	16–3	1–0
March 14	South Carolina	No. 23	Condron Ballpark	**W** 3–0	**A. King** (3–1)	A. Phillips (2–2)	**J. Barberi** (1)	5,340	17–3	2–0
March 15	South Carolina	No. 23	Condron Ballpark	**W** 13–7^{7}	**C. Walls** (3–0)	A. Valentin (0–1)	None	4,784	18–3	3–0
March 17	Stetson	No. 18	Condron Ballpark	**W** 10–1	**C. McDonald** (2–0)	B. Toro (1–2)	None	4,449	19–3	–
March 20	at Alabama	No. 18	Sewell–Thomas Stadium; Tuscaloosa, AL	**L** 0–6	T. Fay (4–2)	**L. Peterson** (1–1)	None	3,610	19–4	3–1
March 21	at Alabama	No. 18	Sewell–Thomas Stadium	**L** 4–8	Z. Adams (4–1)	**A. King** (3–2)	None	3,875	19–5	3–2
March 22	at Alabama	No. 18	Sewell–Thomas Stadium	**L** 7–14	A. Crowther (2–1)	**R. Sandefer** (0–1)	None	3,753	19–6	3–3
March 24	vs. No. 10 Florida State; Rivalry		VyStar Ballpark; Jacksonville, FL	**W** 5–0	**R. Sandefer** (1–1)	C. Whited (1–1)	**J. Barberi** (2)	7,667	20–6	–
March 27	at No. 4 Arkansas		Baum–Walker Stadium; Fayetteville, AR	**W** 9–4	**E. Lugo-Canchola** (1–0)	G. Gaeckle (3–2)	**J. Whritenour** (3)	9,837	21–6	4–3
March 28	at No. 4 Arkansas		Baum–Walker Stadium	**W** 7–4	**J. Barberi** (3–2)	S. Eaves (3–1)	**J. Whritenour** (4)	9,847	22–6	5–3
March 29	at No. 4 Arkansas		Baum–Walker Stadium	**W** 7–6	**R. Sandefer** (2–1)	C. Fisher (2–3)	**L. McNeillie** (1)	9,460	23–6	6–3
March 31	Jacksonville	No. 21	Condron Ballpark	**L** 3–4	K. Hopper (2–0)	**C. Walls** (3–1)	D. Pieto (2)	4,953	23–7	–

April (6–9)
Date	Opponent	Rank	Stadium Site	Score	Win	Loss	Save	Attendance	Overall Record	SEC Record
April 2	Ole Miss	No. 21	Condron Ballpark	**L** 4–6	H. Calhoun (2–2)	**L. Peterson** (1–2)	W. Hooks (1)	5,948	23–8	6–4
April 3	Ole Miss	No. 21	Condron Ballpark	**W** 2–0	**A. King** (4–2)	H. Elliott (3–1)	**J. Whritenour** (5)	5,911	24–8	7–4
April 4	Ole Miss	No. 21	Condron Ballpark	**L** 2–5	W. Hooks (2–0)	**J. Whritenour** (2–1)	None	5,847	24–9	7–5
April 7	at No. 5 Florida State; Rivalry		Dick Howser Stadium; Tallahassee, FL	**W** 4–3	**C. McDonald** (3–0)	C. Whited (1–2)	**J. Whritenour** (6)	6,700	25–9	–
April 10	at No. 4 Georgia		Foley Field; Athens, GA	**W** 8–2	**A. King** (5–2)	J. Volchko (6–1)	None	3,633	26–9	8–5
April 11	at No. 4 Georgia		Foley Field	**L** 1–5	C. Aoki (4–0)	**C. Walls** (3–2)	None	3,633	26–10	8–6
April 12	at No. 4 Georgia		Foley Field	**W** 13–7	**L. McNeillie** (3–0)	G. Edwards (0–1)	None	3,232	27–10	9–6
April 14	Bethune–Cookman	No. 20	Condron Ballpark	**L** 7–13	A. Anselmo (2–1)	**E. Blair** (0–1)	None	4,466	27–11	–
April 16	No. 13 Auburn	No. 20	Condron Ballpark	**W** 6–3	**A. King** (6–2)	A. Alvarez (6–2)	**J. Whritenour** (7)	5,199	28–11	10–6
April 17	No. 13 Auburn	No. 20	Condron Ballpark	**L** 3–5	J. Sanders (3–1)	**L. Peterson** (1–3)	R. Hetzler (2)	5,815	28–12	10–7
April 18	No. 13 Auburn	No. 20	Condron Ballpark	**L** 5–8	R. Hetzler (4–1)	**J. Whritenour** (2–2)	None	5,735	28–13	10–8
April 21	Jacksonville	No. 21	Condron Ballpark	**L** 5–7	B. Baker-Livingston (1–1)	**C. McDonald** (3–1)	P. Waters (1)	4,652	28–14	–
April 24	No. 7 Texas A&M	No. 21	Condron Ballpark	**W** 9–2	**A. King** (7–2)	S. Sdao (3–3)	None	5,880	29–14	11–8
April 25	No. 7 Texas A&M	No. 21	Condron Ballpark	**L** 4–8	A. Sims (8–0)	**L. Peterson** (1–4)	C. Freshcorn (8)	6,639	29–15	11–9
April 26	No. 7 Texas A&M	No. 21	Condron Ballpark	**L** 1–5	G. Lyons (8–0)	**R. Sandefer** (2–2)	C. Freshcorn (9)	5,578	29–16	11–10

May (8–2)
Date	Opponent	Rank	Stadium Site	Score	Win	Loss	Save	Attendance	Overall Record	SEC Record
May 1	at No. 15 Oklahoma	No. 25	Mitchell Park; Norman, OK	**L** 3–4	J. Bodin (4–1)	**J. Whritenour** (2–3)	J. Cleveland (7)	3,611	29–17	11–11
May 2	at No. 15 Oklahoma	No. 25	Mitchell Park	**W** 10–4	**C. McDonald** (4–1)	M. Catalano (3–4)	**E. Lugo-Canchola** (1)	4,679	30–17	12–11
May 3	at No. 15 Oklahoma	No. 25	Mitchell Park	**W** 13–2^{8}	**R. Sandefer** (3–2)	C. Rager (3–3)	None	3,651	31–17	13–11
May 5	North Florida	No. 21	Condron Ballpark	**W** 11–1^{7}	**B. Barlow** (2–0)	T. Groom (0–2)	None	4,552	32–17	–
May 8	Kentucky	No. 21	Condron Ballpark	**W** 7–6	**J. Whritenour** (3–3)	I. Austin IV (0–1)	None	5,937	33–17	14–11
May 9	Kentucky	No. 21	Condron Ballpark	**L** 2–4	J. Jelkin (8–2)	**L. Peterson** (1–5)	None	5,489	33–18	14–12
May 10	Kentucky	No. 21	Condron Ballpark	**W** 9–6	**C. McDonald** (5–1)	T. Peterson (0–1)	None	5,113	34–18	15–12
May 14	at LSU	No. 19	Alex Box Stadium; Baton Rouge, LA	**W** 11–8	**A. King** (8–2)	D. Lachenmayer (2–1)	None	10,553	35–18	16–12
May 15	at LSU	No. 19	Alex Box Stadium	**W** 11–1^{7}	**L. Peterson** (2–5)	M. Paz (1–4)	None	10,759	36–18	17–12
May 16	at LSU	No. 19	Alex Box Stadium	**W** 15–11	**S. Sandford** (2–0)	G. Fontenot (0–2)	**C. Walls** (1)	11,036	37–18	18–12

Postseason (4–3)

SEC tournament (2–1)
Date	Opponent	Rank	Stadium Site	Score	Win	Loss	Save	Attendance	Overall Record	SECT Record
May 20	vs. (12) Vanderbilt; Second round	No. 18 (5)	Hoover Metropolitan Stadium; Hoover, AL	**W** 8–3	**J. Barberi** (4–2)	B. Seiber (5–2)	None	8,352	38–18	1–0
May 21	vs. No. 15 (4) Alabama; Quarterfinals	No. 18 (5)	Hoover Metropolitan Stadium	**W** 13–3^{8}	**L. Peterson** (3–5)	T. Fay (9–4)	None	11,146	39–18	2–0
May 23	vs. No. 4 (1) Georgia; Semifinals	No. 18 (5)	Hoover Metropolitan Stadium	**L** 7–8	J. Byrd (4–2)	**J. Whritenour** (3–4)	None	14,919	39–19	2–1

NCAA tournament: Gainesville Regional (2–2)
Date	Opponent	Rank	Stadium Site	Score	Win	Loss	Save	Attendance	Overall Record	Regional Record
May 29	(4) Rider; First round	No. 10 (1)	Condron Ballpark	**W** 8–7	**J. Whritenour** (4–4)	C. Aiello (8–3)	None	4,001	40–19	1–0
May 30	(2) Miami (FL); Second round, Rivalry	No. 10 (1)	Condron Ballpark	**W** 22–10	**J. Barberi** (5–2)	J. Durso (0–2)	None	5,673	41–19	2–0
May 31	(3) Troy; Regional final game 1	No. 10 (1)	Condron Ballpark	**L** 11–16	C. Ellingsworth (2–4)	**L. Peterson** (3–6)	None	4,751	41–20	2–1
June 1	(3) Troy; Regional final game 2	No. 10 (1)	Condron Ballpark	**L** 2–10	B. Stubbs (5–3)	**C. Walls** (3–3)	N. Thigpen (2)	4,637	41–21	2–2

Schedule source:

*Rankings are based on the team's current ranking in the D1 Baseball poll.

== Postseason awards and honors ==
2026 SEC All-SEC First Team
Player	No.	Position	Class
Aidan King	47	SP	Sophomore

SEC Pitcher of the Year
Player	No.	Position	Class
Aidan King	47	SP	Sophomore

== Record vs. conference opponents ==
Blank are not scheduled. Blue are home games, otherwise away.

2026 SEC baseball records Source: 2026 SEC baseball game results, 2026 SEC baseball schedule
Tm	W–L	ALA	ARK	AUB	FLA	UGA	KEN	LSU	MSU	MIZ	OKL	OMS	SCA	TEN	TEX	TAM	VAN	Tm	SR	SW
ALA	18–12		0–3	3–0	3–0	.	0–3	.	.	.	2–1	2–1	3–0	1–2	1–2	.	3–0	ALA	6–4	4–2
ARK	17–13	3–0		1–2	0–3	1–2	2–1	.	2–1	2–1	2–1	2–1	2–1	.	.	.	.	ARK	7–3	1–1
AUB	17–13	0–3	2–1		2–1	1–2	2–1	.	2–1	3–0	2–1	.	.	.	1–2	2–1	.	AUB	7–3	1–1
FLA	18–12	0–3	3–0	1–2		2–1	2–1	3–0	.	.	2–1	1–2	3–0	.	.	1–2	.	FLA	6–4	3–1
UGA	23–7	.	2–1	2–1	1–2		.	3–0	3–0	3–0	.	2–1	3–0	2–1	.	2–1	.	UGA	9–1	4–0
KEN	13–17	3–0	1–2	1–2	1–2	.		1–2	.	1–2	.	1–2	1–2	2–1	.	.	1–2	KEN	2–8	1–0
LSU	9–21	.	.	.	0–3	0–3	2–1		0–3	.	1–2	0–3	3–0	2–1	.	0–3	1–2	LSU	3–7	1–5
MSU	16–14	.	1–2	1–2	.	0–3	.	3–0		.	.	3–0	3–0	0–3	1–2	1–2	3–0	MSU	4–6	4–2
MIZ	6–24	.	1–2	0–3	.	0–3	2–1	.	.		0–3	.	0–3	1–2	0–3	0–3	2–1	MIZ	2–8	0–6
OKL	14–16	1–2	1–2	1–2	1–2	.	.	2–1	.	3–0		.	.	1–2	0–3	2–1	2–1	OKL	4–6	1–1
OMS	15–15	1–2	1–2	.	2–1	1–2	2–1	3–0	0–3	.	.		.	2–1	1–2	2–1	.	OMS	5–5	1–1
SCA	7–23	0–3	1–2	.	0–3	0–3	2–1	0–3	0–3	3–0	.	.		.	1–2	.	0–3	SCA	2–8	1–6
TEN	15–15	2–1	.	.	.	1–2	1–2	1–2	3–0	2–1	2–1	1–2	.		2–1	.	0–3	TEN	5–5	1–1
TEX	19–10	2–1	.	2–1	.	.	.	.	2–1	3–0	3–0	2–1	2–1	1–2		0–2	2–1	TEX	8–2	2–0
TAM	18–11	.	.	1–2	2–1	1–2	.	3–0	2–1	3–0	1–2	1–2	.	.	2–0		2–1	TAM	6–4	2–0
VAN	14–16	0–3	.	.	.	.	2–1	2–1	0–3	1–2	1–2	.	3–0	3–0	1–2	1–2		VAN	4–6	2–2
Tm	W–L	ALA	ARK	AUB	FLA	UGA	KEN	LSU	MSU	MIZ	OKL	OMS	SCA	TEN	TEX	TAM	VAN	Team	SR	SW

Updated for entire regular season. Texas at Texas A&M, one game cancelled.
Tie breakers: Alabama over Florida (using head-to-head result), Auburn over Arkansas (using head-to-head result), Ole Miss over Tennessee (using head-to-head result), Oklahoma over Vanderbilt (using head-to-head result).

== Rankings ==
Ranking movements Legend: ██ Increase in ranking ██ Decrease in ranking — = Not ranked RV = Received votes
	Week																	
Poll	Pre	1	2	3	4	5	6	7	8	9	10	11	12	13	14	15	16	Final
Coaches'	16	16*	10	8	18	14	25	19	24	18	22	25	20	20	17	14	14*	19
Baseball America	22	24	23	14	25	17	—	14	21	7	12	15	13	9	9	9*	9*	16
NCBWA†	16	16	11	9	16	14	22	18	18	13	24	RV	21	19	17	17*	17	17
D1Baseball	13	12	10	9	23	18	—	21	—	20	21	25	21	19	18	10	10*	16
Perfect Game	12	12	8	7	23	17	—	16	22	11	20	23	20	18	14	14*	14*	19

† NCBWA ranks 30 teams in their preseason poll, but only ranks 25 teams weekly during the season.
* A new poll was not released for this week, so for comparison purposes, the previous week's ranking is inserted in this week's slot.
