= 2026 Arkansas Razorbacks baseball team =

American college baseball team

2026 Arkansas Razorbacks baseball
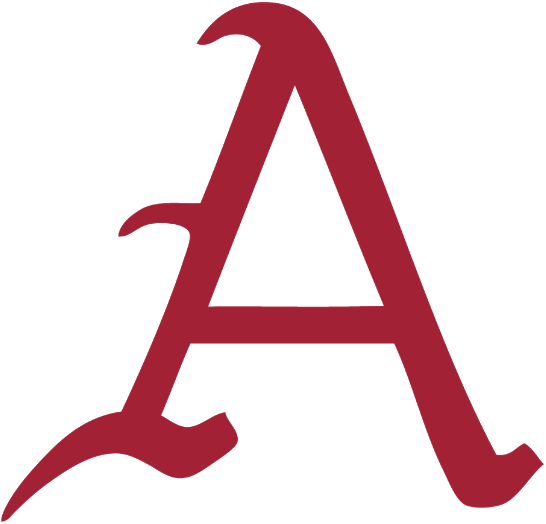

Lawrence Regional, 2–2
- Conference: Southeastern Conference

Ranking
- Coaches: No. 21
- D1Baseball.com: No. 23
- Record: 41–22 (17–13 SEC)
- Head coach: Dave Van Horn (24th season)
- Assistant coaches: Matt Hobbs; Nate Thompson; Bobby Wernes
- Home stadium: Baum–Walker Stadium

2026 Southeastern Conference baseball standings
	Conf.				Overall
Team	W		L	PCT	W		L	PCT
No. 3 Georgia ‍†‍‡‍^{y}	23	–	7	.767	53	–	14	.791
No. 5 Texas ‍‍‍^{y}	19	–	10	.655	46	–	15	.754
No. 17 Texas A&M ‍‍‍^{y}	18	–	11	.621	41	–	16	.719
No. 6 Alabama ‍‍‍^{y}	18	–	12	.600	42	–	21	.667
No. 16 Florida ‍‍‍^{y}	18	–	12	.600	41	–	21	.661
No. 9 Auburn ‍‍‍^{y}	17	–	13	.567	42	–	22	.656
No. 23 Arkansas ‍‍‍^{y}	17	–	13	.567	41	–	22	.651
No. 14 Mississippi State ‍‍‍^{y}	16	–	14	.533	43	–	19	.694
No. 7 Ole Miss ‍‍‍^{y}	15	–	15	.500	41	–	23	.641
Tennessee ‍‍‍^{y}	15	–	15	.500	38	–	22	.633
No. 1 Oklahoma ‍‍‍^{y}	14	–	16	.467	43	–	23	.652
Vanderbilt ‍‍‍	14	–	16	.467	33	–	25	.569
Kentucky ‍‍‍^{y}	13	–	17	.433	33	–	23	.589
LSU ‍‍‍	9	–	21	.300	30	–	28	.517
South Carolina ‍‍‍	7	–	23	.233	22	–	35	.386
Missouri ‍‍‍	6	–	24	.200	24	–	31	.436
† – Conference champion ‡ – Tournament champion y – Invited to the NCAA Tournament; As of June 22, 2026; Rankings from D1Baseball

The 2026 Arkansas Razorbacks baseball team represented the University of Arkansas in the 2026 NCAA Division I baseball season. The Razorbacks played their home games at Baum–Walker Stadium in Fayetteville, Arkansas. Dave Van Horn was in his 24th season as head coach of the Razorbacks.

The team finished the regular season with a 36–19 record. They went 17–13 in SEC contests, winning seven series and losing three. They completed one SEC series sweep (at No. 8 Alabama) and one non-conference sweep (Xavier), and they were swept once by a conference opponent (Florida). They earned the No. 7 seed at the SEC tournament, where they defeated (10) Tennessee, (2) Texas, and (6) Auburn before losing in the championship game to regular-season champion Georgia.

Arkansas was an at-large selection to the NCAA tournament and was assigned to the Lawrence Regional, hosted by Kansas, as the No. 2 seed. They defeated (3) (Missouri State) in their opening game but lost to Kansas in the regional semifinal, relegating them to the consolation bracket. Needing three consecutive wins to advance to the super regional, Arkansas defeated Northeastern, but they were beaten in a rematch with Kansas. They finished the season with a 41–22 record; their overall win total, overall win percentage (0.651), and conference win percentage (0.567) were the lowest in a full season since 2016.

== Roster ==
2026 Arkansas Razorbacks baseball team
Players
Coaches

#	Pos.	Name	B/T	Height	Weight	Year	Previous school	Home town
1	INF	Carson Brumbaugh	R/R	6 ft 3 in (1.91 m)	215 lb (98 kg)	Fr	Edmond Santa Fe HS	Edmond, OK
3	INF	Nolan Souza	L/R	6 ft 3 in (1.91 m)	215 lb (98 kg)	Jr	Punahou School	Honolulu, HI
4	OF	Maika Niu	R/R	6 ft 1 in (1.85 m)	190 lb (86 kg)	Sr	Trinity HS / University of New Orleans / Marshall University	Mechanicsburg, PA
5	INF	TJ Pompey	R/R	6 ft 4 in (1.93 m)	215 lb (98 kg)	Jr	Coppell HS / Texas Tech University	Coppell, TX
8	INF	Camden Kozeal	L/R	5 ft 10 in (1.78 m)	205 lb (93 kg)	Jr	Millard South HS / Vanderbilt University	Omaha, NE
9	INF	Alexander Peck	R/R	6 ft 4 in (1.93 m)	205 lb (93 kg)	Fr	University School of Nashville	Franklin, TN
10	INF	Tyler Holland	R/R	6 ft 1 in (1.85 m)	195 lb (88 kg)	RS Fr	Mission Viejo HS	Mission Viejo, CA
11	UTL	Luke Cornelison	R/R	6 ft 1 in (1.85 m)	205 lb (93 kg)	Fr	Har-Ber HS	Springdale, AR
12	C	Carter Rutenbar	L/R	5 ft 11 in (1.8 m)	195 lb (88 kg)	Fr	Midlothian Heritage HS	Midlothian, TX
13	RHP	Steele Eaves	R/R	6 ft 0 in (1.83 m)	210 lb (95 kg)	So	Lonoke HS	Lonoke, AR
14	RHP	Mark Brissey	R/R	6 ft 3 in (1.91 m)	215 lb (98 kg)	Fr	Fayetteville HS	Batesville, AR
15	RHP	Jackson Kircher	R/R	6 ft 4 in (1.93 m)	215 lb (98 kg)	So	Little Rock Christian Academy / University of Oklahoma	Little Rock, AR
16	OF	Christian Turner	L/R	6 ft 0 in (1.83 m)	180 lb (82 kg)	Fr	Haughton HS	Haughton, LA
17	OF	Zack Stewart	L/R	6 ft 2 in (1.88 m)	220 lb (100 kg)	Sr	Lebanon HS / Missouri State University	Lebanon, MO
18	INF	Reese Robinett	L/R	6 ft 3 in (1.91 m)	220 lb (100 kg)	RS Jr	Kennett HS	Kennett, MO
19	C	Carson Willis	R/R	5 ft 11 in (1.8 m)	205 lb (93 kg)	RS Fr	P27 Academy	Hot Springs, AR
20	RHP	Gabe Gaeckle	R/R	6 ft 0 in (1.83 m)	190 lb (86 kg)	Jr	Aptos HS	Aptos, CA
21	OF	Brenton Clark	L/R	5 ft 11 in (1.8 m)	195 lb (88 kg)	RS Fr	Pleasant Grove HS	Texarkana, TX
22	RHP	Peyton Lee	R/R	6 ft 5 in (1.96 m)	205 lb (93 kg)	Fr	Maumelle HS	Maumelle, AR
24	UTL	Landon Schaefer	R/R	6 ft 3 in (1.91 m)	190 lb (86 kg)	Fr	Fayetteville HS	Fayetteville, AR
25	OF	Kuhio Aloy	R/R	6 ft 1 in (1.85 m)	205 lb (93 kg)	Jr	Henry Perrine Baldwin HS / Brigham Young University	Wailuku, HI
26	RHP	Tate McGuire	R/R	6 ft 3 in (1.91 m)	215 lb (98 kg)	Jr	Liberty North HS	Liberty, MO
27	C	Ryder Helfrick	R/R	6 ft 1 in (1.85 m)	210 lb (95 kg)	Jr	Clayton Valley Charter HS	Discovery Bay, CA
28	RHP	Jordan Martin	R/R	6 ft 6 in (1.98 m)	225 lb (102 kg)	Fr	Jefferson City HS	Jefferson City, MO
29	LHP	Cole Gibler	L/L	6 ft 2 in (1.88 m)	205 lb (93 kg)	So	Blue Springs HS	Blue Springs, MO
32	LHP	Hunter Dietz	R/L	6 ft 6 in (1.98 m)	235 lb (107 kg)	RS So	Calvary Christian HS	Trinity, FL
33	LHP	Ethan McElvain	S/L	6 ft 4 in (1.93 m)	250 lb (113 kg)	Jr	Nolensville HS / Vanderbilt University	Thompson's Station, TN
34	LHP	Joey Lorenzini	L/L	6 ft 5 in (1.96 m)	225 lb (102 kg)	Fr	Rocklin HS	Rocklin, CA
35	INF	Cayden Mitchell	R/R	6 ft 2 in (1.88 m)	205 lb (93 kg)	Fr	Mansfield Timberview HS	Arlington, TX
36	LHP	Parker Coil	R/R	6 ft 3 in (1.91 m)	195 lb (88 kg)	Sr	Edmond Memorial HS	Edmond, OK
37	RHP	Grant Wren	R/R	6 ft 4 in (1.93 m)	210 lb (95 kg)	Fr	Melbourne HS	Melbourne, AR
38	LHP	Colin Fisher	L/L	6 ft 3 in (1.91 m)	225 lb (102 kg)	Jr	Noble HS	Noble, OK
39	LHP	Jacob Imoto	L/L	6 ft 3 in (1.91 m)	200 lb (91 kg)	So	Mission Hills HS / Palomar College	Vista, CA
40	RHP	James DeCremer	R/R	6 ft 1 in (1.85 m)	205 lb (93 kg)	RS So	Brophy College Preparatory / Oregon State University	Phoenix, AZ
42	OF	Damian Ruiz	R/R	6 ft 0 in (1.83 m)	190 lb (86 kg)	RS Jr	Livingston HS / Houston Christian University / Lamar University	Livingston, TX
44	RHP	Carson Wiggins	R/R	6 ft 5 in (1.96 m)	215 lb (98 kg)	So	Roland HS	Roland, OK
45	UTL	Tye Briscoe	L/L	5 ft 11 in (1.8 m)	195 lb (88 kg)	Fr	Wylie HS	Abilene, TX
48	RHP	Cooper Dossett	R/R	6 ft 0 in (1.83 m)	210 lb (95 kg)	RS Jr	Har-Ber HS	Springdale, AR
55	C	Brendan Kleiman	R/R	5 ft 10 in (1.78 m)	190 lb (86 kg)	Gr	Sherwood HS / Frederick CC / Eastern Michigan University	Olney, MD

Head coach

Dave Van Horn (Arkansas, 1988) – 24th season

Assistant coach(es)

Bobby Wernes (Arkansas, 2018) – 6th season
Hudson Polk (Arkansas, 2024) – 2nd season

Hitting coach(es)

Nate Thompson (Dallas Baptist, 2006) – 9th season

Pitching coach(es)

Matt Hobbs (Missouri, 2002) – 8th season

Legend

- (C) Team captain
- (S) Suspended
- (I) Ineligible
- Injured
- Current redshirt

Roster
Last update: February 16, 2026

== Schedule and results ==
2026 Arkansas Razorbacks baseball game log (41–22)
Regular season (36–19)

February (8–3)
Date	Opponent	Rank	Site/stadium	Score	Win	Loss	Save	TV	Attendance	Overall record	SEC record
Shriners Children's College Showdown
February 13	vs. Oklahoma State	No. 7	Globe Life Field; Arlington, Texas	**W** 12–2 (8)	**Cole Gibler** (1–0)	Hudson Barrett (0–1)		FloSports	18,387	1–0	—
February 14	vs. No. 10 TCU	No. 7	Globe Life Field	**L** 4–5	Zack James (1–0)	**Hunter Dietz** (0–1)	Noah Franco (1)	FloSports	22,384	1–1	—
February 15	vs. Texas Tech	No. 7	Globe Life Field	**W** 6–5 (11)	**Steele Eaves** (1–0)	Logan Bevis (0–1)		FloSports	16,951	2–1	—
Amegy Bank College Baseball Series
February 16	vs. Tarleton State	No. 8	Globe Life Field	**W** 3–1	**Ethan McElvain** (1–0)	Daniel Bass (0–1)	**Mark Brissey** (1)		1,258	3–1	—
February 20	Xavier	No. 8	Baum–Walker Stadium; Fayetteville, Arkansas	**W** 5–2	**Gabe Gaeckle** (1–0)	Ryan Piech (0–1)	**Cole Gibler** (1)	SECN+	10,388	4–1	—
February 21	Xavier	No. 8	Baum–Walker Stadium	**W** 7–6	**Steele Eaves** (2–0)	Owen Poole (0–1)		SECN+	9,829	5–1	—
February 22	Xavier	No. 8	Baum–Walker Stadium	**W** 11–0 (8)	**Colin Fisher** (1–0) **CG**	Jack DeTienne (0–2)		SECN+	9,054	6–1	—
February 24	Arkansas State	No. 6	Baum–Walker Stadium	**L** 4–12	Brett Foss (1–0)	**Peyton Lee** (0–1)	Cooper Garrison (1)	SECN+	9,039	6–2	—
February 25	Arkansas State	No. 6	Baum–Walker Stadium	**W** 1–0	**Steele Eaves** (3–0)	Collin Maloney (0–1)	**Parker Coil** (1)	SECN+	9,122	7–2	—
February 27	UT Arlington	No. 6	Baum–Walker Stadium	**L** 3–4	Caylon Dygert (1–0)	**Gabe Gaeckle** (1–1)	Hayes Melville (1)	SECN+	9,495	7–3	—
February 28	UT Arlington	No. 6	Baum–Walker Stadium	**W** 9–0	**Hunter Dietz** (1–1)	Dylan Skolfield (0–3)		SECN+	10,997	8–3	—

March (11–8)
Date	Opponent	Rank	Site/stadium	Score	Win	Loss	Save	TV	Attendance	Overall record	SEC record
March 1	UT Arlington	No. 6	Baum–Walker Stadium	**W** 11–1 (7)	**Colin Fisher** (2–0)	Zach Evans (0–1)		SECN+	8,897	9–3	–
March 3	Oral Roberts	No. 6	Baum–Walker Stadium	**W** 10–2	**Ethan McElvain** (2–0)	Keaton Ruthardt (0–1)		SECN+	8,899	10–3	–
March 6	Stetson	No. 6	Baum–Walker Stadium	**W** 7–1	**Gabe Gaeckle** (2–1)	Zane Coppersmith (1–2)		SECN+	8,901	11–3	–
March 7	Stetson	No. 6	Baum–Walker Stadium	**W** 13–1 (7)	**Hunter Dietz** (2–1)	Ethan Phillips (1–2)		SECN+	9,747	12–3	–
March 8	Stetson	No. 6	Baum–Walker Stadium	**L** 1–4	Trace Hartman (2–1)	**Colin Fisher** (2–1)	Andrew Lepine (1)	SECN+	9,047	12–4	–
March 9	Stetson	No. 5	Baum–Walker Stadium	**L** 4–6	Connor Ball (1–0)	**James DeCremer** (0–1)	Andrew Lepine (2)	SECN+	8,713	12–5	–
March 13	No. 3 Mississippi State	No. 5	Baum–Walker Stadium	**W** 5–4	**Cole Gibler** (2–0)	Maddox Miller (1–2)		SECN+	10,464	13–5	1–0
March 14 (DH-1)	No. 3 Mississippi State	No. 5	Baum–Walker Stadium	**L** 2–7	Tomas Valincius (4–0)	**Hunter Dietz** (2–2)		SEC Network	10,790	13–6	1–1
March 14 (DH-2)	No. 3 Mississippi State	No. 5	Baum–Walker Stadium	**W** 7–3	**Ethan McElvain** (3–0)	Tyler Pitzer (1–1)		SECN+	9,653	14–6	2–1
March 17	Northern Colorado	No. 4	Baum–Walker Stadium	**W** 12–2 (8)	**Jackson Kircher** (1–0)	Mitch Haythorn (0–2)		SECN+	9,270	15–6	—
March 18	Northern Colorado	No. 4	Baum–Walker Stadium	**W** 9–4	**Peyton Lee** (1–1)	Logan Moser (0–2)		SECN+	9,105	16–6	—
March 20	at South Carolina	No. 4	Founders Park; Columbia, South Carolina	**W** 22–6 (7)	**Gabe Gaeckle** (3–1)	Josh Gunther (2–1)		SECN+	6,737	17–6	3–1
March 21	at South Carolina	No. 4	Founders Park	**W** 3–2 (10)	**Cole Gibler** (3–0)	Alex Valentin (0–2)		SECN+	6,822	18–6	4–1
March 22	at South Carolina	No. 4	Founders Park	**L** 4–9	Brandon Stone (3–1)	**Colin Fisher** (2–2)		SECN+	6,404	18–7	4–2
March 24	Central Arkansas	No. 4	Baum–Walker Stadium	**W** 15–2 (7)	**Parker Coil** (1–0)	Jacob Pannell (0–2)		SECN+	9,623	19–7	—
March 27	Florida	No. 4	Baum–Walker Stadium	**L** 4–9	Ernesto Lugo-Canchola (1–0)	**Gabe Gaeckle** (3–2)	Joshua Whritenour (3)	SECN+	9,837	19–8	4–3
March 28	Florida	No. 4	Baum–Walker Stadium	**L** 4–7	Jackson Barberi (3–2)	**Steele Eaves** (3–1)	Joshua Whritenour (4)	SECN+	9,847	19–9	4–4
March 29	Florida	No. 4	Baum–Walker Stadium	**L** 6–7	Russell Sandefer (2–1)	**Colin Fisher** (2–3)	Luke McNeillie (1)	SEC Network	9,460	19–10	4–5
March 31	at Missouri State	No. 17	Hammons Field; Springfield, Missouri	**L** 14–15 (10)	Curry Sutherland (1–0)	**Peyton Lee** (1–2)		ESPN+	6,538	19–11	—

April (11–5)
Date	Opponent	Rank	Site/stadium	Score	Win	Loss	Save	TV	Attendance	Overall record	SEC record
April 2	at No. 18 Auburn	No. 17	Plainsman Park; Auburn, Alabama	**L** 2–10	Andreas Alvarez (5–1)	**Gabe Gaeckle** (3–3)	LJ Cormier (1)	ESPN2	5,753	19–12	4–6
April 3	at No. 18 Auburn	No. 17	Plainsman Park	**W** 3–2	**Hunter Dietz** (3–2)	Jett Johnston (0–1)	**Ethan McElvain** (1)	SECN+	5,678	20–12	5–6
April 4	at No. 18 Auburn	No. 17	Plainsman Park	**L** 3–8	Alex Petrovic (5–1)	**Colin Fisher** (2–4)	Jackson Sanders (1)	SECN+	5,503	20–13	5–7
April 7	Little Rock	No. 22	Baum–Walker Stadium	**W** 7–0	**Steele Eaves** (4–1)	Gage Haley (3–2)		SECN+	9,517	21–13	—
April 10	at No. 8 Alabama	No. 22	Sewell–Thomas Stadium; Tuscaloosa, Alabama	**W** 7–5	**Gabe Gaeckle** (4–3)	Matthew Heiberger (2–1)	**Parker Coil** (2)	SECN+	5,075	22–13	6–7
April 11	at No. 8 Alabama	No. 22	Sewell–Thomas Stadium	**W** 15–6	**Colin Fisher** (3–4)	Sam Mitchell (0–1)		SEC Network	5,249	23–13	7–7
April 12	at No. 8 Alabama	No. 22	Sewell–Thomas Stadium	**W** 3–2	**Gabe Gaeckle** (5–3)	Ashton Crowther (2–2)	**Ethan McElvain** (2)	SECN+	4,235	24–13	8–7
April 14	vs. Arkansas–Pine Bluff	No. 16	Dickey–Stephens Park; North Little Rock, Arkansas	**W** 12–2 (7)	**Colin Fisher** (4–4)	Reagan James (3–3)		SECN+	9,191	25–13	—
April 16	No. 5 Georgia	No. 16	Baum–Walker Stadium	**W** 6–3	**Hunter Dietz** (4–2)	Joey Volchko (6–2)	**Ethan McElvain** (3)	ESPNU	10,320	26–13	9–7
April 17	No. 5 Georgia	No. 16	Baum–Walker Stadium	**L** 3–5	Caden Aoki (5–0)	**Cole Gibler** (3–1)	Justin Byrd (3)	SECN+	10,593	26–14	9–8
April 18	No. 5 Georgia	No. 16	Baum–Walker Stadium	**L** 14–26	Matt Scott (6–0)	**Colin Fisher** (4–5)		SECN+	10,784	26–15	9–9
April 21	Missouri State	No. 24	Baum–Walker Stadium	**W** 12–4	**Parker Coil** (2–0)	Brody McNiel (1–1)		SECN+	9,716	27–15	—
April 23	at Missouri	No. 24	Taylor Stadium; Columbia, Missouri	**W** 5–4	**Hunter Dietz** (5–2)	Trey Lawrence (2–1)	**Ethan McElvain** (4)	SEC Network	1,631	28–15	10–9
April 24	at Missouri	No. 24	Taylor Stadium	**W** 6–0	**Cole Gibler** (4–1)	Brady Kehlenbrink (3–7)	**Steele Eaves** (1)	SEC Network	1,778	29–15	11–9
April 25	at Missouri	No. 24	Taylor Stadium	**L** 1–6	Keyler Gonzalez (3–0)	**Colin Fisher** (4–6)		SECN+	1,781	29–16	11–10
April 28	Northwestern State	No. 22	Baum–Walker Stadium	**Canceled (inclement weather)**							
April 29	Northwestern State	No. 22	Baum–Walker Stadium	**W** 5–2	**Steele Eaves** (5–1)	Caleb Muffoletto (0–1)	**Ethan McElvain** (5)	SECN+	9,277	30–16	—

May (6–3)
Date	Opponent	Rank	Site/stadium	Score	Win	Loss	Save	TV	Attendance	Overall record	SEC record
May 1	No. 17 Ole Miss	No. 22	Baum–Walker Stadium	**W** 12–2 (7)	**Hunter Dietz** (6–2)	Hunter Elliott (4–2)		SECN+	10,676	31–16	12–10
May 2	No. 17 Ole Miss	No. 22	Baum–Walker Stadium	**L** 4–11	Cade Townsend (5–1)	**Cole Gibler** (4–2)		SECN+	10,491	31–17	12–11
May 3	No. 17 Ole Miss	No. 22	Baum–Walker Stadium	**W** 5–4	**Ethan McElvain** (4–0)	Walker Hooks (3–1)		SEC Network	9,891	32–17	13–11
May 8	No. 24 Oklahoma	No. 17	Baum–Walker Stadium	**W** 12–2 (7)	**Hunter Dietz** (7–2) **CG**	LJ Mercurius (6–6)		SECN+	10,158	33–17	14–11
May 9	No. 24 Oklahoma	No. 17	Baum–Walker Stadium	**W** 12–8	**Tate McGuire** (1–0)	Jackson Cleveland (2–2)		SECN+	10,049	34–17	15–11
May 10	No. 24 Oklahoma	No. 17	Baum–Walker Stadium	**L** 10–15	Nate Smithburg (1–0)	**Colin Fisher** (4–7)		SECN+	9,773	34–18	15–12
May 14	at Kentucky	No. 12	Kentucky Proud Park; Lexington, Kentucky	**L** 3–4	Jack Sams (2–0)	**Hunter Dietz** (7–3)	Jaxon Jelkin (1)	SECN+	3,272	34–19	15–13
May 15	at Kentucky	No. 12	Kentucky Proud Park	**W** 5–4	**Ethan McElvain** (5–0)	Leighton Harris (0–1)		SECN+	4,000	35–19	16–13
May 16	at Kentucky	No. 12	Kentucky Proud Park	**W** 16–12	**Parker Coil** (3–0)	Tristan Hunter (0–1)	**James DeCremer** (1)	SECN+	3,963	36–19	17–13

Postseason (5–3)

SEC Tournament (3–1)
Date	Opponent	Rank	Site/stadium	Score	Win	Loss	Save	TV	Attendance	Overall record	SECT record
May 20	(10) No. 23 Tennessee	(7) No. 12	Hoover Metropolitan Stadium; Hoover, Alabama	**W** 8–4	**Cole Gibler** (5–2)	Evan Blanco (7–4)		SEC Network		37–19	1–0
May 22	(2) No. 5 Texas	(7) No. 12	Hoover Metropolitan Stadium	**W** 8–1	**Gabe Gaeckle** (4–3)	Cody Howard (0–1)		SEC Network		38–19	2–0
May 23	(6) No. 6 Auburn	(7) No. 12	Hoover Metropolitan Stadium	**W** 2–1	**Ethan McElvain** (6–0)	Ryan Hetzler (4–2)		SEC Network		39–19	3–0
May 24	(1) No. 4 Georgia	(7) No. 12	Hoover Metropolitan Stadium	**L** 1–11 (7)	Paul Farley (8–1)	**Tate McGuire** (1–1)		SEC Network	9,320	39–20	3–1

NCAA Lawrence Regional (2–2)
Date	Opponent	Rank	Site/stadium	Score	Win	Loss	Save	TV	Attendance	Overall record	NCAAT record
May 29	vs. Missouri State	No. 14	Hoglund Ballpark; Lawrence, Kansas	**W** 9–5	**Steele Eaves** (6–1)	Brock Lucas (6–6)	**Ethan McElvain** (6)	ESPNU	2,773	40–20	1–0
May 30	at (15) No. 13 Kansas	No. 14	Hoglund Ballpark	**L** 3–5	Riane Ritter (8–2)	**Hunter Dietz** (7–4)	Boede Rahe (11)	ESPN2	4,042	40–21	1–1
May 31	vs. Northeastern	No. 14	Hoglund Ballpark	**W** 10–9	**Steele Eaves** (7–1)	Tom Mahoney (0–1)	**Cooper Dossett** (1)	ESPN+	1,983	41–21	2–1
May 31	at (15) No. 13 Kansas	No. 14	Hoglund Ballpark	**L** 10–13	Manning West (4–0)	**Cole Gibler** (5–3)		ESPN+	4,007	41–22	2–2

- Win
- Loss
- Postponement or cancellation
- Bold: Arkansas player
- Rankings from D1Baseball.com.
- (#) Tournament seedings in parentheses.

== Record vs. conference opponents ==
Blank are not scheduled. Blue are home games, otherwise away.

2026 SEC baseball records Source: 2026 SEC baseball game results, 2026 SEC baseball schedule
Tm	W–L	ALA	ARK	AUB	FLA	UGA	KEN	LSU	MSU	MIZ	OKL	OMS	SCA	TEN	TEX	TAM	VAN	Tm	SR	SW
ALA	18–12		0–3	3–0	3–0	.	0–3	.	.	.	2–1	2–1	3–0	1–2	1–2	.	3–0	ALA	6–4	4–2
ARK	17–13	3–0		1–2	0–3	1–2	2–1	.	2–1	2–1	2–1	2–1	2–1	.	.	.	.	ARK	7–3	1–1
AUB	17–13	0–3	2–1		2–1	1–2	2–1	.	2–1	3–0	2–1	.	.	.	1–2	2–1	.	AUB	7–3	1–1
FLA	18–12	0–3	3–0	1–2		2–1	2–1	3–0	.	.	2–1	1–2	3–0	.	.	1–2	.	FLA	6–4	3–1
UGA	23–7	.	2–1	2–1	1–2		.	3–0	3–0	3–0	.	2–1	3–0	2–1	.	2–1	.	UGA	9–1	4–0
KEN	13–17	3–0	1–2	1–2	1–2	.		1–2	.	1–2	.	1–2	1–2	2–1	.	.	1–2	KEN	2–8	1–0
LSU	9–21	.	.	.	0–3	0–3	2–1		0–3	.	1–2	0–3	3–0	2–1	.	0–3	1–2	LSU	3–7	1–5
MSU	16–14	.	1–2	1–2	.	0–3	.	3–0		.	.	3–0	3–0	0–3	1–2	1–2	3–0	MSU	4–6	4–2
MIZ	6–24	.	1–2	0–3	.	0–3	2–1	.	.		0–3	.	0–3	1–2	0–3	0–3	2–1	MIZ	2–8	0–6
OKL	14–16	1–2	1–2	1–2	1–2	.	.	2–1	.	3–0		.	.	1–2	0–3	2–1	2–1	OKL	4–6	1–1
OMS	15–15	1–2	1–2	.	2–1	1–2	2–1	3–0	0–3	.	.		.	2–1	1–2	2–1	.	OMS	5–5	1–1
SCA	7–23	0–3	1–2	.	0–3	0–3	2–1	0–3	0–3	3–0	.	.		.	1–2	.	0–3	SCA	2–8	1–6
TEN	15–15	2–1	.	.	.	1–2	1–2	1–2	3–0	2–1	2–1	1–2	.		2–1	.	0–3	TEN	5–5	1–1
TEX	19–10	2–1	.	2–1	.	.	.	.	2–1	3–0	3–0	2–1	2–1	1–2		0–2	2–1	TEX	8–2	2–0
TAM	18–11	.	.	1–2	2–1	1–2	.	3–0	2–1	3–0	1–2	1–2	.	.	2–0		2–1	TAM	6–4	2–0
VAN	14–16	0–3	.	.	.	.	2–1	2–1	0–3	1–2	1–2	.	3–0	3–0	1–2	1–2		VAN	4–6	2–2
Tm	W–L	ALA	ARK	AUB	FLA	UGA	KEN	LSU	MSU	MIZ	OKL	OMS	SCA	TEN	TEX	TAM	VAN	Team	SR	SW

Updated for entire regular season. Texas at Texas A&M, one game cancelled.
Tie breakers: ALA>FLA hd to hd, AUB>ARK hd to hd, OMS>TEN hd to hd, OKL>VAN hd to hd.

== Rankings ==
Ranking movements Legend: ██ Increase in ranking ██ Decrease in ranking — = Not ranked т = Tied with team above or below
	Week																	
Poll	Pre	1	2	3	4	5	6	7	8	9	10	11	12	13	14	15	16	Final
Coaches'	5	5*	6	9	6	7	6	16т	22	17	24	22	18	14	13	13	13*	21
Baseball America	10	10	9	9	8	5	5	15	22	14	18	16	14	10	10	10*	10*	21
NCBWA†	5	8	6	8	6	5	6	15	23	18	21	19	16	12	13	13*	23	22
D1Baseball	7	8	6	6	5	4	4	17	22	16	24	22	17	12	12	14	14*	23
Perfect Game	4	4	4	9	7	5	4	19	—	—	—	—	23	21	17	17*	17*	24

† NCBWA ranks 30 teams in their preseason poll, but only ranks 25 teams weekly during the season.
* A new poll was not released for this week, so for comparison purposes, the previous week's ranking is inserted in this week's slot.
