= 2026 Missouri Tigers baseball team =

American college baseball season

2026 Missouri Tigers baseball
- Conference: Southeastern Conference
- Record: 24–31 (6–24 SEC)
- Head coach: Kerrick Jackson (3rd season)
- Associate head coach: Tim Jamieson (24th season)
- Assistant coach: Jabari Brown (3rd season)
- Hitting coach: Bryson LeBlanc (3rd season)
- Pitching coach: Drew Dickinson (1st season)
- Home stadium: Ralph and Debbie Taylor Stadium

2026 Southeastern Conference baseball standings
	Conf.				Overall
Team	W		L	PCT	W		L	PCT
No. 3 Georgia ‍†‍‡‍^{y}	23	–	7	.767	48	–	12	.800
No. 6 Texas ‍‍‍^{y}	19	–	10	.655	42	–	13	.764
No. 11 Texas A&M ‍‍‍^{y}	18	–	11	.621	41	–	14	.745
No. 16 Alabama ‍‍‍^{y}	18	–	12	.600	39	–	19	.672
No. 10 Florida ‍‍‍^{y}	18	–	12	.600	41	–	19	.683
No. 5 Auburn ‍‍‍^{y}	17	–	13	.567	39	–	20	.661
No. 14 Arkansas ‍‍‍^{y}	17	–	13	.567	40	–	21	.656
No. 17 Mississippi State ‍‍‍^{y}	16	–	14	.533	42	–	17	.712
No. 18 Ole Miss ‍‍‍^{y}	15	–	15	.500	38	–	21	.644
No. 23 Tennessee ‍‍‍^{y}	15	–	15	.500	38	–	22	.633
Oklahoma ‍‍‍^{y}	14	–	16	.467	33	–	22	.600
Vanderbilt ‍‍‍	14	–	16	.467	33	–	25	.569
Kentucky ‍‍‍^{y}	13	–	17	.433	33	–	21	.611
LSU ‍‍‍	9	–	21	.300	30	–	28	.517
South Carolina ‍‍‍	7	–	23	.233	22	–	35	.386
Missouri ‍‍‍	6	–	24	.200	24	–	31	.436
† – Conference champion ‡ – Tournament champion y – Invited to the NCAA Tournament; As of May 31, 2026; Rankings from D1Baseball

The 2026 Missouri Tigers baseball team represents the University of Missouri during the 2026 NCAA Division I baseball season. The Tigers are coached by third-year head coach Kerrick Jackson and play their home games at Ralph and Debbie Taylor Stadium.

== Preseason ==
=== SEC coaches poll ===
SEC coaches poll
Predicted finish	Team	Votes (1st place)
1	LSU	231 (9)
2	Texas	214 (1)
3	Mississippi State	205 (4)
4	Arkansas	203 (2)
5	Auburn	175
6	Tennessee	162
7	Florida	156
8	Vanderbilt	151
9	Georgia	133
10	Ole Miss	110
11	Kentucky	99
12	Alabama	87
13	Texas A&M	86
14	Oklahoma	84
15	South Carolina	49
16	Missouri	31

== Personnel ==
=== Starters ===
Lineup
Pos.	No.	Player.	Year
C	8	Mateo Serna	Junior
1B	25	Jase Woita	Graduate
2B	19	Blaize Ward	Freshman
3B	12	Keegan Knutson	Senior
SS	27	Kam Durnin	Junior
LF	6	Tyler Macon	RS Sophomore
CF	7	Kaden Peer	Junior
RF	5	Pierre Seals	Graduate
DH	1	Cameron Benson	Senior

Weekend pitching rotation
Day	No.	Player.	Year
Friday	54	Josh McDevitt	Junior
Saturday	40	Brady Kehlenbrink	Sophomore
Sunday	43	Javyn Pimental	Graduate
Midweek	51	JD Dohrmann	Freshman

=== Roster ===
2026 Missouri Tigers baseball team
Players
Coaches

#	Pos.	Name	B/T	Height	Weight	Year	Home town
1	UTL	Cameron Benson	L/R	6 ft 3 in (1.91 m)	185 lb (84 kg)	Jr	Farmington Hills, MI
3	INF	Peyton Basler	S/R	6 ft 0 in (1.83 m)	195 lb (88 kg)	RS Sr	Lansing, KS
4	INF	Gehrig Goldbeck	L/R	6 ft 1 in (1.85 m)	175 lb (79 kg)	Sr	Kansas City, KS
5	OF	Pierre Seals	R/R	6 ft 0 in (1.83 m)	210 lb (95 kg)	Gr	Memphis, TN
6	INF	Tyler Macon	R/R	6 ft 1 in (1.85 m)	210 lb (95 kg)	RS So	Kirkwood, MO
7	OF	Kaden Peer	L/R	6 ft 3 in (1.91 m)	205 lb (93 kg)	Jr	Chesterfield, MO
8	C	Mateo Serna	S/R	6 ft 0 in (1.83 m)	205 lb (93 kg)	Jr	Doral, FL
10	RHP	Trey Lawrence	R/R	6 ft 3 in (1.91 m)	180 lb (82 kg)	So	Palmetto, FL
11	RHP	Aeneas Clark	R/R	6 ft 3 in (1.91 m)	205 lb (93 kg)	Jr	Peoria, AZ
12	INF	Keegan Knutson	R/R	5 ft 10 in (1.78 m)	195 lb (88 kg)	Sr	Janesville, WI
13	OF	Sam Parker	L/L	6 ft 4 in (1.93 m)	235 lb (107 kg)	Jr	Marietta, GA
14	OF	Isaiah Frost	L/L	5 ft 11 in (1.8 m)	195 lb (88 kg)	RS Sr	Lee's Summit, MO
17	INF	Chris Patterson	R/R	6 ft 3 in (1.91 m)	190 lb (86 kg)	So	Frisco, TX
18	INF	Eric Maisonet	S/R	5 ft 11 in (1.8 m)	175 lb (79 kg)	Jr	Florida, PR
19	INF	Blaize Ward	L/R	6 ft 1 in (1.85 m)	185 lb (84 kg)	Fr	Maumelle, AR
20	RHP	PJ Green	R/R	6 ft 2 in (1.88 m)	195 lb (88 kg)	So	Tyrone, GA
21	C	Jamal George	R/R	5 ft 11 in (1.8 m)	190 lb (86 kg)	Sr	Trujillo Alto, PR
22	LHP	Kadden Drew	R/L	6 ft 2 in (1.88 m)	210 lb (95 kg)	Gr	Scottsdale, AZ
23	LHP	Ian Lohse	L/L	6 ft 0 in (1.83 m)	200 lb (91 kg)	Gr	St. Louis, MO
24	RHP	Keyler Gonzalez	R/R	5 ft 11 in (1.8 m)	195 lb (88 kg)	Jr	Santa Clara, CUB
25	INF	Jase Woita	L/R	6 ft 3 in (1.91 m)	220 lb (100 kg)	Gr	Lincoln, NE
26	RHP	Eli Skidmore	R/R	6 ft 1 in (1.85 m)	200 lb (91 kg)	Fr	O'Fallon, MO
27	INF	Kam Durnin	R/R	6 ft 1 in (1.85 m)	200 lb (91 kg)	Jr	Linn Creek, MO
28	LHP	Juan Villarreal	L/L	6 ft 6 in (1.98 m)	220 lb (100 kg)	Sr	Panama City, PAN
29	LHP	Dane Bjorn	L/L	6 ft 1 in (1.85 m)	195 lb (88 kg)	RS Fr	St. Louis, MO
30	RHP	Luke Sullivan	R/R	6 ft 4 in (1.93 m)	200 lb (91 kg)	Fr	St. Louis, MO
32	RHP	Richie Swain	R/R	6 ft 5 in (1.96 m)	205 lb (93 kg)	Fr	Wentzville, MO
35	RHP	Luke Fricker	R/R	6 ft 2 in (1.88 m)	210 lb (95 kg)	RS So	Kansas City, KS
36	RHP	Keagen Kohlhoff	L/R	6 ft 1 in (1.85 m)	225 lb (102 kg)	Fr	Birch Run, MI
37	OF	Leo Humbert	R/L	6 ft 0 in (1.83 m)	195 lb (88 kg)	Fr	St. Charles, MO
38	C	Juliomar Campos	R/R	5 ft 11 in (1.8 m)	205 lb (93 kg)	Fr	San Juan, PR
39	C	Ethan Johnson	L/R	6 ft 2 in (1.88 m)	215 lb (98 kg)	Fr	San Jose, CA
40	LHP	Brady Kehlenbrink	R/L	6 ft 2 in (1.88 m)	205 lb (93 kg)	So	Ballwin, MO
41	LHP	Nic Smith	L/L	6 ft 3 in (1.91 m)	200 lb (91 kg)	RS Jr	Jamestown, TN
43	LHP	Javyn Pimental	L/L	6 ft 3 in (1.91 m)	215 lb (98 kg)	Gr	Kaneohe, HI
44	LHP	Jackson Sobel	L/L	6 ft 2 in (1.88 m)	200 lb (91 kg)	RS So	Charleston, SC
47	RHP	Sam Rosand	R/R	6 ft 2 in (1.88 m)	230 lb (104 kg)	Fr	Washington, DC
48	RHP	Kadin Muckley	R/R	6 ft 5 in (1.96 m)	200 lb (91 kg)	RS Jr	Encinitas, CA
49	LHP	Isaiah Salas	L/L	5 ft 11 in (1.8 m)	190 lb (86 kg)	Fr	Woodlands, TX
50	RHP	Ben Smith	R/R	6 ft 2 in (1.88 m)	195 lb (88 kg)	Jr	Springfield, MO
51	RHP	JD Dohrmann	R/R	6 ft 2 in (1.88 m)	205 lb (93 kg)	Fr	St. Louis, MO
54	RHP	Josh McDevitt	R/R	6 ft 2 in (1.88 m)	195 lb (88 kg)	Jr	Effingham, IL
88	OF	Donovan Jordan	R/R	6 ft 1 in (1.85 m)	215 lb (98 kg)	RS Fr	Humble, TX
—	LHP	Todd Feurtado III (redshirt)	L/L	6 ft 1 in (1.85 m)	190 lb (86 kg)	Fr	Queens, NY
—	RHP	Connor Jones (redshirt)	R/R	6 ft 3 in (1.91 m)	210 lb (95 kg)	Fr	Houston, TX
—	RHP	Brady Rosenkranz (redshirt)	R/R	6 ft 8 in (2.03 m)	225 lb (102 kg)	Fr	Lincolnshire, IL

Head coach

Kerrick Jackson

Assistant coach(es)

Tim Jamieson
Bryson LeBlanc
Jabari Brown
Drew Dickinson

Legend

- (C) Team captain
- (S) Suspended
- (I) Ineligible
- Injured
- Current redshirt

Roster
Last update: April 21, 2026

== Game log ==
2026 Missouri Tigers baseball game log
(Overall: 24–31; Conference: 6–24); (Home: 14–14; Away: 3–15; Neutral: 7–2)
Regular season (23–30)
February (10–2)
(Home: 10–1; Away: 0–1)

Date	Time (CST)	Opponent	Rank	TV	Venue	Score	Win	Loss	Save	Attendance	Overall record	SEC record
February 13	5:00 p.m.	Mount St. Mary's*			Terry Park Ballfield (Note: Missouri was the home team for the series, despite it being played at a neutral venue.); Fort Myers, FL	**L** 5–8	McCrary (1–0)	**Sobel** (0–1)	—	221	0–1	—
February 14	5:00 p.m.	Mount St. Mary's*			Terry Park Ballfield	**W** 5–4	**McDevitt** (1–0)	Halcisak (0–1)	**Lohse** (1)	254	1–1	—
February 15	12:00 p.m.	Mount St. Mary's*			Terry Park Ballfield	**W** 34–3	**Kehlenbrink** (1–0)	Derossi-Cytron (0–1)	—	237	2–1	—
February 17	5:30 p.m.	at Florida Atlantic*		FAUSports.com	FAU Baseball Stadium; Boca Raton, FL	**L** 2–4	Smith (1–0)	**Rosand** (0–1)	Boully (1)	564	2–2	—
February 20	5:30 p.m.	New Haven*			Terry Park Ballfield	**W** 12–2^{(7)}	**Pimental** (1–0)	McDermott (0–1)	—	249	3–2	—
February 21	5:00 p.m.	New Haven*			Terry Park Ballfield	**W** 17–5^{(7)}	**McDevitt** (2–0)	Fusco (0–1)	—	261	4–2	—
February 22	3:00 p.m.	New Haven*			Terry Park Ballfield	**W** 16–2^{(7)}	**Kehlenbrink** (2–0)	Gibson (0–1)	—	278	5–2	—
February 24	3:00 p.m.	UAPB*			Ralph and Debbie Taylor Stadium; Columbia, MO	**W** 15–1^{(7)}	**Dohrmann** (1–0)	Hasten (0–1)	—	946	6–2	—
February 25	1:00 p.m.	UAPB*		SECN+	Ralph and Debbie Taylor Stadium	**W** 5–1	**Sobel** (1–1)	Hamlin (0–1)	**Lohse** (2)	887	7–2	—
February 27	6:00 p.m.	North Dakota State*		SECN+	Ralph and Debbie Taylor Stadium	**W** 11–5	**Pimental** (2–0)	Puetz (0–2)	—	1,148	8–2	—
February 28	1:00 p.m.	North Dakota State*		SECN+	Ralph and Debbie Taylor Stadium	**W** 5–3	**Green** (1–0)	Marks (1–1)	**Lohse** (3)	1,201	9–2	—
February 28	4:45 p.m.	North Dakota State*		SECN+	Ralph and Debbie Taylor Stadium	**W** 7–5	**Lawrence** (1–0)	Reimers (0–1)	**Lohse** (4)	1,201	10–2	—

March (7–11)
(Home: 5–6; Away: 1–5; Neutral: 1–0)

Date	Time (CST)	Opponent	Rank	TV	Venue	Score	Win	Loss	Save	Attendance	Overall record	SEC record
March 5	6:30 p.m.	UIC*		SECN+	Ralph and Debbie Taylor Stadium	**W** 9–8	**Skidmore** (1–0)	Eddie (0–1)	**Rosand** (1)	954	11–2	—
March 6	4:00 p.m.	UIC*		SECN+	Ralph and Debbie Taylor Stadium	**W** 13–12	**Rosand** (1–1)	Millsap (0–2)	—	957	12–2	—
March 7	4:30 p.m.	UIC*			Ralph and Debbie Taylor Stadium	**W** 7–0	**McDevitt** (3–0)	Bak (1–2)	—	925	13–2	—
March 8	1:00 p.m.	UIC*		SECN+	Ralph and Debbie Taylor Stadium	**W** 10–0^{(7)}	**Kehlenbrink** (2–0)	Buss (0–2)	—	1,072	14–2	—
March 10	1:00 p.m.	Southern Indiana*		SECN+	Ralph and Debbie Taylor Stadium	**W** 14–6	**Skidmore** (2–0)	East (2–2)	—	801	15–2	—
March 13	6:00 p.m.	No. 6 Auburn		SECN+	Ralph and Debbie Taylor Stadium	**L** 0-2	Marciano (3–0)	**Dohrmann** (1–1)	Brewer (3)	1,375	15–3	0–1
March 14	2:00 p.m.	No. 6 Auburn		SECN+	Ralph and Debbie Taylor Stadium	**L** 3–4^{(10)}	Hetzler (3–0)	**Rosand** (1–2)	—	1,733	15–4	0–2
March 14	6:00 p.m.	No. 6 Auburn		SECN+	Ralph and Debbie Taylor Stadium	**L** 2–9	Petrovic (4–0)	**Kehlenbrink** (3–1)	—	1,733	15–5	0–3
March 18	4:00 p.m.	at Kansas*		B12N+	Hoglund Ballpark; Lawrence, KS	**L** 0–10^{(7)}	Carr (1–0)	**Sullivan** (0–1)	—	1,158	15–6	—
March 20	5:30 p.m.	at No. 22 Tennessee		SECN+	Lindsey Nelson Stadium; Knoxville, TN	**W** 8–4	**Dohrmann** (2–1)	Kuhns (1–2)	**Rosand** (2)	6,359	16–6	1–3
March 21	6:00 p.m.	at No. 22 Tennessee		SECN+	Lindsey Nelson Stadium	**L** 2–4	Appenzeller (3–0)	**McDevitt** (3–1)	Rhudy (1)	6,826	16–7	1–4
March 22	12:00 p.m.	at No. 22 Tennessee		SECN+	Lindsey Nelson Stadium	**L** 1–7	Blanco (2–2)	Kehlenbrink (3–2)	—	5,977	16–8	1–5
March 24	6:30 p.m.	vs. Illinois*			CarShield Field; O'Fallon, MO	**W** 5–1	**Gonzalez** (1–0)	Plumley (1–3)	—	1,859	17–8	—
March 25	6:00 p.m.	at Lindenwood*		ESPN+	Lou Brock Sports Complex; St. Charles, MO	**L** 4–10	Paschke (1–0)	**Sullivan** (0–2)	—	936	17–9	—
March 27	6:00 p.m.	No. 25 Texas A&M			Ralph and Debbie Taylor Stadium	**L** 9–11	Vargas (2–0)	**McDevitt** (3–2)	Freshcorn (6)	1,842	17–10	1–6
March 28	4:00 p.m.	No. 25 Texas A&M		SECN+	Ralph and Debbie Taylor Stadium	**L** 6–14	Lyons (3–0)	**Kehlenbrink** (3–3)	Cunningham (1)	1,135	17–11	1–7
March 29	1:00 p.m.	No. 25 Texas A&M		SECN+	Ralph and Debbie Taylor Stadium	**L** 3–14^{(7)}	Sims (5–0)	**Sullivan** (0–3)	—	1,295	17–12	1–8
March 31	4:30 p.m.	Kansas*		SECN	Ralph and Debbie Taylor Stadium	**L** 8–11	Seidl (2–1)	**Drew** (0–1)	West (1)	3,207	17–13	—

April (4–10)
(Home; 2–6; Away: 2–4)

Date	Time (CST)	Opponent	Rank	TV	Venue	Score	Win	Loss	Save	Attendance	Overall record	SEC record
April 3	5:30 p.m.	at No. 24 Kentucky		SECN+	Kentucky Proud Park; Lexington, KY	**W** 5–4	**Lawrence** (2–0)	Soucie (0–1)	—	2,343	18–13	2–8
April 4	12:00 p.m.	at No. 24 Kentucky		SECN+	Kentucky Proud Park	**L** 2–9	N. Harris (4–2)	**Kehlenbrink** (3–4)	—	3,471	18–14	2–9
April 5	12:00 p.m.	at No. 24 Kentucky		SECN	Kentucky Proud Park	**W** 5–2	**Villareal** (1–0)	Cleaver (1–2)	**Skidmore** (1)	2,611	19–14	3–9
April 7	6:30 p.m.	Missouri State*		SECN+	Ralph and Debbie Taylor Stadium	**W** 5–2	**Gonzalez** (2–0)	Lucas (3–3)	**Lawrence** (3)	1,306	20–14	—
April 9	7:00 p.m.	South Carolina		ESPNU	Ralph and Debbie Taylor Stadium	**L** 1–5	Stone (4–1)	**McDevitt** (3–3)	Russell (1)	1,512	20–15	3–10
April 10	6:00 p.m.	South Carolina		SECN+	Ralph and Debbie Taylor Stadium	**L** 0–1	Phillips (3–4)	**Kehlenbrink** (3–5)	Philpott (2)	1,260	20–16	3–11
April 11	2:00 p.m.	South Carolina		SECN+	Ralph and Debbie Taylor Stadium	**L** 4–6	Parks (3–1)	**Rosand** (1–3)	Philpott (3)	1,396	20–17	3–12
April 15	6:30 p.m.	at Missouri State*		ESPN+	Hammons Field; Springfield, MO	**Canceled (inclement weather)**						
April 17	6:30 p.m.	at No. 14 Oklahoma		SECN+	L. Dale Mitchell Baseball Park; Norman, OK	**L** 6–9	Mercurius (6–4)	**McDevitt** (3–4)	—	3,212	20–18	3–13
April 18	2:00 p.m.	at No. 14 Oklahoma		SECN+	L. Dale Mitchell Baseball Park	**L** 0–4	Johnson (5–1)	**Kehlenbrink** (3–6)	—	4,804	20–19	3–14
April 19	1:00 p.m.	at No. 14 Oklahoma		SECN+	L. Dale Mitchell Baseball Park	**L** 4–6	Rager (3–1)	**Pimental** (2–1)	—	3,519	20–20	3–15
April 21	6:00 p.m.	SIUE*		SECN	Ralph and Debbie Taylor Stadium	**L** 5–11	Grams (3–1)	**Villarreal** (1–1)	—	1,237	20–21	—
April 23	7:00 p.m.	No. 24 Arkansas		SECN	Ralph and Debbie Taylor Stadium	**L** 4–5	Dietz (5–2)	**Lawrence** (2–1)	McElvain (4)	1,631	20–22	3–16
April 24	7:00 p.m.	No. 24 Arkansas		SECN	Ralph and Debbie Taylor Stadium	**L** 0–6	Gibler (4–1)	**Kehlenbrink** (3–7)	Eaves (1)	1,778	20–23	3–17
April 25	2:00 p.m.	No. 24 Arkansas		SECN+	Ralph and Debbie Taylor Stadium	**W** 6–1	**Gonzalez** (3–0)	Fisher (4–6)	None	1,781	21–23	4–17
April 28	6:00 p.m.	at SE Missouri State*		ESPN+	Capaha Field; Cape Girardeau, MO	**Canceled (inclement weather)**						

May (2–6)
(Home; 2–1; Away: 0–5)

Date	Time (CST)	Opponent	Rank	TV	Venue	Score	Win	Loss	Save	Attendance	Overall record	SEC record
May 1	5:00 p.m.	at No. 5 Georgia		SECN+	Foley Field; Athens, GA	**L** 0–4	Volchko (7–2)	**McDevitt** (3–5)	Scott (3)	3,152	21–24	4–18
May 2	1:00 p.m.	at No. 5 Georgia		SECN+	Foley Field	**L** 3–13^{(8)}	Vigue (4–1)	**Kehlenbrink** (3–8)	Byrd (6)	3,070	21–25	4–19
May 3	11:00 a.m.	at No. 5 Georgia		SECN	Foley Field	**L** 4–14^{(7)}	Aoki (7–0)	**Gonzalez** (3–1)	—	2,856	21–26	4–20
May 5	6:00 p.m.	No. 16 Arizona State*		SECN+	Ralph and Debbie Taylor Stadium	**Canceled (impending inclement weather)**						
May 8 (Note: Game was suspended due to heavy fog and completed on May 9.)	5:30 p.m.	Vanderbilt		SECN+	Ralph and Debbie Taylor Stadium	**W** 8–7^{(11)}	**Villarreal** (2–1)	Baird (0–5)	—	1,086	22–26	5–20
May 9	5:00 p.m.	Vanderbilt		SECN+	Ralph and Debbie Taylor Stadium	**L** 8–11^{(11)}	Nadeau (2–3)	**Lawrence** (2–2)	—	2,101	22–27	5–21
May 10	11:00 a.m.	Vanderbilt		SECN+	Ralph and Debbie Taylor Stadium	**W** 4–1	**Salas** (1–0)	Hamilton (2–1)	**Rosand** (3)	1,351	23–27	6–21
May 14	6:30 p.m.	at No. 6 Texas		SECN+	UFCU Disch–Falk Field; Austin, TX	**L** 3–6	Volantis (8–1)	**Bjorn** (0–1)	Cozart (8)	7,334	23–28	6–22
May 15	6:30 p.m.	at No. 6 Texas		SECN+	UFCU Disch–Falk Field	**L** 6–11	Harrison (6–3)	**Kehlenbrink** (3–9)	—	7,472	23–29	6–23
May 16	2:00 p.m.	at No. 6 Texas		SECN+	UFCU Disch–Falk Field	**L** 7–12	Higgins (1–1)	**Villarreal** (2–2)	—	7,277	23–30	6–24

Postseason (1–1)
SEC tournament (1–1)

Date	Time (CST)	Opponent	Rank	TV	Venue	Score	Win	Loss	Save	Attendance	Overall record	Tournament record
May 19	9:30 a.m.	vs. No. 17 (9) Ole Miss	(16)	SECN	Hoover Metropolitan Stadium; Hoover, AL	**W** 10–8					24–30	1–0
May 20	9:30 a.m.	vs. No. 16 (8) Mississippi State	(16)	SECN	Hoover Metropolitan Stadium	**L** 2–12^{(7)}					24–31	1–1

"#" represents ranking. All rankings from D1Baseball Poll on the date of the contest.
"()" represents postseason seeding in the SEC Tournament or NCAA Regional, respectively.
= Win, = Loss, = Canceled/Postponed
Bold = **Missouri Tigers team member**
* = Non-Conference Game
Schedule Source:

Schedule Notes:

== Record vs. conference opponents ==
Blank are not scheduled. Blue are home games, otherwise away.

2026 SEC baseball records Source: 2026 SEC baseball game results, 2026 SEC baseball schedule
Tm	W–L	ALA	ARK	AUB	FLA	UGA	KEN	LSU	MSU	MIZ	OKL	OMS	SCA	TEN	TEX	TAM	VAN	Tm	SR	SW
ALA	18–12		0–3	3–0	3–0	.	0–3	.	.	.	2–1	2–1	3–0	1–2	1–2	.	3–0	ALA	6–4	4–2
ARK	17–13	3–0		1–2	0–3	1–2	2–1	.	2–1	2–1	2–1	2–1	2–1	.	.	.	.	ARK	7–3	1–1
AUB	17–13	0–3	2–1		2–1	1–2	2–1	.	2–1	3–0	2–1	.	.	.	1–2	2–1	.	AUB	7–3	1–1
FLA	18–12	0–3	3–0	1–2		2–1	2–1	3–0	.	.	2–1	1–2	3–0	.	.	1–2	.	FLA	6–4	3–1
UGA	23–7	.	2–1	2–1	1–2		.	3–0	3–0	3–0	.	2–1	3–0	2–1	.	2–1	.	UGA	9–1	4–0
KEN	13–17	3–0	1–2	1–2	1–2	.		1–2	.	1–2	.	1–2	1–2	2–1	.	.	1–2	KEN	2–8	1–0
LSU	9–21	.	.	.	0–3	0–3	2–1		0–3	.	1–2	0–3	3–0	2–1	.	0–3	1–2	LSU	3–7	1–5
MSU	16–14	.	1–2	1–2	.	0–3	.	3–0		.	.	3–0	3–0	0–3	1–2	1–2	3–0	MSU	4–6	4–2
MIZ	6–24	.	1–2	0–3	.	0–3	2–1	.	.		0–3	.	0–3	1–2	0–3	0–3	2–1	MIZ	2–8	0–6
OKL	14–16	1–2	1–2	1–2	1–2	.	.	2–1	.	3–0		.	.	1–2	0–3	2–1	2–1	OKL	4–6	1–1
OMS	15–15	1–2	1–2	.	2–1	1–2	2–1	3–0	0–3	.	.		.	2–1	1–2	2–1	.	OMS	5–5	1–1
SCA	7–23	0–3	1–2	.	0–3	0–3	2–1	0–3	0–3	3–0	.	.		.	1–2	.	0–3	SCA	2–8	1–6
TEN	15–15	2–1	.	.	.	1–2	1–2	1–2	3–0	2–1	2–1	1–2	.		2–1	.	0–3	TEN	5–5	1–1
TEX	19–10	2–1	.	2–1	.	.	.	.	2–1	3–0	3–0	2–1	2–1	1–2		0–2	2–1	TEX	8–2	2–0
TAM	18–11	.	.	1–2	2–1	1–2	.	3–0	2–1	3–0	1–2	1–2	.	.	2–0		2–1	TAM	6–4	2–0
VAN	14–16	0–3	.	.	.	.	2–1	2–1	0–3	1–2	1–2	.	3–0	3–0	1–2	1–2		VAN	4–6	2–2
Tm	W–L	ALA	ARK	AUB	FLA	UGA	KEN	LSU	MSU	MIZ	OKL	OMS	SCA	TEN	TEX	TAM	VAN	Team	SR	SW

Updated for entire regular season. Texas at Texas A&M, one game cancelled.
Tie breakers: ALA>FLA hd to hd, AUB>ARK hd to hd, OMS>TEN hd to hd, OKL>VAN hd to hd.

== Rankings ==
Ranking movements Legend: — = Not ranked
	Week																
Poll	Pre	1	2	3	4	5	6	7	8	9	10	11	12	13	14	15	Final
Coaches'	—	—*	—	—	—	—	—	—	—	—	—	—	—	—	—	—	
Baseball America	—	—	—	—	—	—	—	—	—	—	—	—	—	—	—	—	
NCBWA†	—	—	—	—	—	—	—	—	—	—	—	—	—	—	—	—	
D1Baseball	—	—	—	—	—	—	—	—	—	—	—	—	—	—	—	—	
Perfect Game	—	—	—	—	—	—	—	—	—	—	—	—	—	—	—	—	

† NCBWA ranks 30 teams in their preseason poll, but only ranks 25 teams weekly during the season.
* A new poll was not released for this week, so for comparison purposes, the previous week's ranking is inserted in this week's slot.
