= 2026 Vanderbilt Commodores baseball team =

American college baseball season

2026 Vanderbilt Commodores baseball
- Conference: Southeastern Conference
- Record: 33–25 (14–16 SEC)
- Head coach: Tim Corbin (24th season)
- Associate head coach: Scott Brown (10th season)
- Assistant coaches: Jason Esposito (1st season); Ty Blankmeyer (2nd season)
- Pitching coach: Scott Brown (14th season)
- Home stadium: Hawkins Field

2026 Southeastern Conference baseball standings
	Conf.				Overall
Team	W		L	PCT	W		L	PCT
No. 3 Georgia ‍†‍‡‍^{y}	23	–	7	.767	49	–	12	.803
No. 6 Texas ‍‍‍^{y}	19	–	10	.655	43	–	13	.768
No. 11 Texas A&M ‍‍‍^{y}	18	–	11	.621	41	–	16	.719
No. 16 Alabama ‍‍‍^{y}	18	–	12	.600	40	–	19	.678
No. 10 Florida ‍‍‍^{y}	18	–	12	.600	41	–	21	.661
No. 5 Auburn ‍‍‍^{y}	17	–	13	.567	42	–	20	.677
No. 14 Arkansas ‍‍‍^{y}	17	–	13	.567	41	–	22	.651
No. 17 Mississippi State ‍‍‍^{y}	16	–	14	.533	43	–	17	.717
No. 18 Ole Miss ‍‍‍^{y}	15	–	15	.500	39	–	21	.650
No. 23 Tennessee ‍‍‍^{y}	15	–	15	.500	38	–	22	.633
Oklahoma ‍‍‍^{y}	14	–	16	.467	36	–	22	.621
Vanderbilt ‍‍‍	14	–	16	.467	33	–	25	.569
Kentucky ‍‍‍^{y}	13	–	17	.433	33	–	23	.589
LSU ‍‍‍	9	–	21	.300	30	–	28	.517
South Carolina ‍‍‍	7	–	23	.233	22	–	35	.386
Missouri ‍‍‍	6	–	24	.200	24	–	31	.436
† – Conference champion ‡ – Tournament champion y – Invited to the NCAA Tournament; As of June 1, 2026; Rankings from D1Baseball

The 2026 Vanderbilt Commodores baseball team represents Vanderbilt University during the 2026 NCAA Division I baseball season. The Commodores play their home games at Hawkins Field as a member of the Southeastern Conference (SEC) and are led by 24th-year head coach Tim Corbin.

== Previous season ==
The 2025 Commodores had a 43–18 (19–11) season record. The Commodores finished fourth in the SEC regular season and won the SEC Tournament. Vanderbilt earned an automatic bid into the 2025 NCAA Division I baseball tournament, where they were the #1 seed in the Louisville Regional, where they beat #4 seed Wright State but lost to #2 seed Louisville and #4 seed Wright State.

== Preseason ==
=== Preseason SEC awards and honors ===
Preseason All-SEC Second Team
Player	No.	Position	Class
Braden Holcomb	26	DH/Util.	Junior
Connor Fennell	39	P	Junior

=== Coaches poll ===
Coaches' Poll
Predicted finish	Team	Points
1	LSU	231 (9)
2	Texas	214 (1)
3	Mississippi State	205 (4)
4	Arkansas	203 (2)
5	Auburn	175
6	Tennessee	162
7	Florida	156
8	Vanderbilt	151
9	Georgia	133
10	Ole Miss	110
11	Kentucky	99
12	Alabama	97
13	Texas A&M	86
14	Oklahoma	84
15	South Carolina	49
16	Missouri	31

== Personnel ==
=== Starters ===
Lineup
Pos.	No.	Player.	Year
C			
1B			
2B			
3B			
SS			
LF			
CF			
RF			
DH			

Weekend pitching rotation
Day	No.	Player.	Year
Friday			
Saturday			
Sunday			

=== Roster ===
2026 Vanderbilt Commodores baseball team
Players
Coaches

#	Pos.	Name	B/T	Height	Weight	Year	Home town
2	OF	Logan Johnstone	L/R	5 ft 11 in (1.8 m)	191 lb (87 kg)	Gr	Los Gatos, California
3	INF	Carter Johnstone	L/R	6 ft 1 in (1.85 m)	185 lb (84 kg)	So	Los Gatos, California
5	INF	Mike Mancini	L/R	5 ft 11 in (1.8 m)	180 lb (82 kg)	Sr	Endwell, New York
8	INF	Chris Maldonado	R/R	6 ft 1 in (1.85 m)	194 lb (88 kg)	Sr	Short Hills, New Jersey
9	INF	Brodie Johnston	R/R	6 ft 2 in (1.88 m)	212 lb (96 kg)	So	Ooltewah, Tennessee
10	UTL	Carson Quillen	R/R	5 ft 11 in (1.8 m)	198 lb (90 kg)	Fr	Greeneville, Tennessee
18	C	Korbin Reynolds	R/R	6 ft 0 in (1.83 m)	215 lb (98 kg)	Fr	Clarksville, Tennessee
19	UTL	Rustan Rigdon	S/R	6 ft 0 in (1.83 m)	185 lb (84 kg)	So	Metter, Georgia
20	OF	Cade Sears	L/L	6 ft 1 in (1.85 m)	179 lb (81 kg)	So	Westphalia, Iowa
21	RHP	Hudson Barton	R/R	6 ft 3 in (1.91 m)	198 lb (90 kg)	So	Franklin, Tennessee
25	C	Mack Whitcomb	R/R	6 ft 0 in (1.83 m)	196 lb (89 kg)	Jr	Mokena, Illinois
26	UTL	Braden Holcomb	R/R	6 ft 5 in (1.96 m)	245 lb (111 kg)	Jr	Orlando, Florida
28	OF	Will Hampton	L/L	5 ft 11 in (1.8 m)	193 lb (88 kg)	So	Richmond Hill, Georgia
30	LHP	Aiden Stillman	R/L	6 ft 3 in (1.91 m)	205 lb (93 kg)	Fr	Winter Park, Florida
32	RHP	Nate Schlote	R/R	6 ft 3 in (1.91 m)	210 lb (95 kg)	Fr	Fairway, Kansas
33	RHP	Luke Guth	R/R	6 ft 1 in (1.85 m)	188 lb (85 kg)	Jr	Franklin, Pennsylvania
34	RHP	Brennan Seiber	R/R	6 ft 6 in (1.98 m)	240 lb (109 kg)	Jr	Newport Beach, California
36	RHP	Jacob Faulkner	R/R	6 ft 1 in (1.85 m)	215 lb (98 kg)	Gr	Venice, Florida
37	LHP	Jakob Schulz	R/L	6 ft 2 in (1.88 m)	219 lb (99 kg)	Jr	Houston, Texas
39	RHP	Connor Fennell	R/R	6 ft 1 in (1.85 m)	183 lb (83 kg)	Jr	Londonderry, New Hampshire
40	RHP	Austin Nye	R/R	6 ft 2 in (1.88 m)	210 lb (95 kg)	So	Roseville, California
42	OF	Collin Brightwell	S/R	6 ft 1 in (1.85 m)	167 lb (76 kg)	Fr	Atlanta, Georgia
43	LHP	Matthew Shorey	L/L	6 ft 2 in (1.88 m)	186 lb (84 kg)	So	Nashville, Tennessee
44	C	Colin Barczi	R/R	6 ft 3 in (1.91 m)	217 lb (98 kg)	Jr	Naperville, Illinois
45	RHP	Connnor Hamilton	R/R	6 ft 4 in (1.93 m)	209 lb (95 kg)	Fr	Thompson's Station, Tennessee
46	RHP	Tyler Baird	R/R	6 ft 4 in (1.93 m)	192 lb (87 kg)	Fr	Huntersville, North Carolina
47	OF	Tommy Goodin	L/R	6 ft 1 in (1.85 m)	206 lb (93 kg)	So	Thousand Oaks, California
50	C	Aukai Kea	R/R	6 ft 1 in (1.85 m)	206 lb (93 kg)	So	Kapolei, Hawaii
51	INF	Ryker Waite	S/R	5 ft 10 in (1.78 m)	184 lb (83 kg)	So	Queen Creek, Arizona
55	INF	Max Jensen	L/R	6 ft 3 in (1.91 m)	222 lb (101 kg)	Gr	Burke, Virginia
66	RHP	Deegan Cordova	R/R	6 ft 2 in (1.88 m)	188 lb (85 kg)	Jr	Lake Havasu City, Arizona
70	RHP	Tristan Bristow	R/R	6 ft 3 in (1.91 m)	199 lb (90 kg)	So	Helotes, Texas
77	RHP	Alex Kranzler	R/R	6 ft 3 in (1.91 m)	219 lb (99 kg)	Jr	Norwood, New Jersey
80	RHP	Nate Taylor	R/R	6 ft 2 in (1.88 m)	222 lb (101 kg)	So	Flowery Branch, Georgia
88	RHP	Wyatt Nadeau	R/R	6 ft 6 in (1.98 m)	242 lb (110 kg)	Fr	Gorham, Maine
90	LHP	Miller Green	L/L	6 ft 5 in (1.96 m)	231 lb (105 kg)	Jr	Nashville, Tennessee
92	RHP	Adria Casoliba	R/R	6 ft 3 in (1.91 m)	219 lb (99 kg)	Fr	Punta Cana, Dominican Republic
96	RHP	Nate Teague	R/R	6 ft 7 in (2.01 m)	230 lb (104 kg)	Jr	Snow Camp, North Carolina
99	RHP	England Bryan	R/R	6 ft 1 in (1.85 m)	225 lb (102 kg)	So	Hillsboro, Tennessee

Head coach

Tim Corbin

Assistant coach(es)

Scott Brown
Jason Esposito
Ty Blankmeyer

Legend

- (C) Team captain
- (S) Suspended
- (I) Ineligible
- Injured
- Current redshirt

Roster
Last update: March 3, 2026

=== Coaching staff ===
2026 Vanderbilt Commodores baseball coaching staff
Name	Position	Seasons at Vandy	Alma mater
Tim Corbin	Head coach	24	Ohio State University (1984)
Scott Brown	Associate head coach	14	Cortland State University (1999)
Jason Esposito	Assistant coach	1	Vanderbilt University (2011)
Ty Blankmeyer	Assistant coach	2	St. John's University (2016)

== Offseason ==
=== Departures ===
Offseason departures
Name	Number	Pos.	Height	Weight	Year	Hometown	Notes

==== Outgoing transfers ====
Outgoing transfers
Name	Number	Pos.	Height	Weight	Hometown	Year	New school	Source

==== 2025 MLB draft ====
Round	Pick	Overall pick	Player	Position	MLB team
2	16	59	J.D. Thompson	P	Milwaukee Brewers
3	18	93	RJ Austin	OF	Baltimore Orioles
3	25	100	Cody Bowker	P	Philadelphia Phillies
5	26	162	Riley Nelson	1B	Cleveland Guardians
6	18	183	Sawyer Hawks	P	Arizona Diamondbacks
16	6	471	Levi Huesman	P	Washington Nationals
19	25	580	Jonathan Vastine	SS	San Diego Padres

=== Acquisitions ===
==== Incoming transfers ====
Incoming transfers
Name	Number	Pos.	Height	Weight	Hometown	Year	Previous school	Source

==== Incoming recruits ====
2025 Vanderbilt Recruits
Name	Number	B/T	Pos.	Height	Weight	Hometown	High School	Source

== Schedule and results ==
2026 Vanderbilt Commodores baseball game log (Overall: 33–25; Conference: 14–16); (Home: 26–8; Away: 5–11; Neutral: 2–6)
Regular season (32–24)
February (7–4)
(Home; 6–0; Away: 0–0; Neutral: 1–4)

Date	Time (CST)	Opponent	Rank	TV	Venue	Score	Win	Loss	Save	Attendance	Overall record	SEC record
Shriners Children's College Showdown
February 13	3:00 p.m.	No. 10 TCU*	No. 23	FloSports	Globe Life Field • Arlington, Texas	**L** 4–5	Stern (1–0)	**Guth** (0–1)	Quinn (1)	18,387	0–1	—
February 14	11:00 a.m.	Texas Tech*	No. 23	FloSports	Globe Life Field • Arlington, Texas	**W** 13–3 (8)	**Seiber** (1–0)	Pirko (0–1)	None	22,384	1–1	—
February 15	10:30 a.m.	Oklahoma State*	No. 23	FloSports	Globe Life Field • Arlington, Texas	**L** 1–11 (8)	Wech (1–0)	**Taylor** (0–1)	None		1–2	—
February 17	4:30 p.m.	vs Eastern Michigan*		SECN+	Hawkins Field • Nashville, Tennessee	**W** 13–2 (7)	**Guth** (1–1)	Davis (0–1)	None	3,001	2–2	—
February 18	4:30 p.m.	vs Eastern Michigan*		SECN+	Hawkins Field • Nashville, Tennessee	**W** 16–2 (7)	**Seiber** (2–0)	Mueller (0–1)	None	3,000	3–2	—
February 20	2:00 p.m.	vs Marist*		SECN+	Hawkins Field • Nashville, Tennessee	**W** 16–5 (8)	**Fennell** (1–0)	Taylor (0–1)	**Bryan** (1)	3,064	4–2	—
February 21	2:00 p.m.	vs Marist*		SECN+	Hawkins Field • Nashville, Tennessee	**W** 12–1 (7)	**Nye** (1–0)	Hartley (0–1)	None	3,097	5–2	—
February 22	1:00 p.m.	vs Marist*		SECN+	Hawkins Field • Nashville, Tennessee	**W** 8–1	**Faulkner** (1–0)	Mazza (0–2)	None	2,973	6–2	—
February 24	4:30 p.m.	vs Evansville*		SECN+	Hawkins Field • Nashville, Tennessee	**W** 15–3 (7)	**Kranzler** (1–0)	Roberts (0–1)	None	2,684	7–2	—
Live Like Lou Las Vegas College Classic
February 27	4:00 p.m.	UC Irvine*		D1Baseball	Las Vegas Ballpark • Las Vegas, Nevada	**L** 4–9	Hansen (3–0)	**Bryan** (0–1)	None	4,722	7–3	—
February 28	6:00 p.m.	Arizona*		D1Baseball	Las Vegas Ballpark • Las Vegas, Nevada	**L** 1–5	Bailey (1–0)	**Kranzler** (1–1)	None	5,713	7–4	—

March (11–8)
(Home; 11–4; Away: 0–3; Neutral: 0–1)

Date	Time (CST)	Opponent	Rank	TV	Venue	Score	Win	Loss	Save	Attendance	Overall record	SEC record
March 1	1:00 p.m.	Oregon*		D1Baseball	Las Vegas Ballpark • Las Vegas, Nevada	**L** 4–6	Scolari (2–0)	**Taylor** (0–2)	Bell (2)	5,304	7–5	—
March 3	4:30 p.m.	vs Central Arkansas*		SECN+	Hawkins Field • Nashville, Tennessee	**L** 4–5	Williams (1–1)	**Kranzler** (1–2)	Alexander (4)	2,671	7–6	—
March 4	3:00 p.m.	vs Troy*		SECN+	Hawkins Field • Nashville, Tennessee	**W** 4–1	**Schulz** (1–0)	Crotchf (0–1)	**Bristow** (1)	2,735	8–6	—
March 6	4:30 p.m.	vs North Dakota State*		SECN+	Hawkins Field • Nashville, Tennessee	**W** 14–2^{(7)}	**Fennell** (2–0)	Puetz (0–3)	None	3,147	9–6	—
March 7	7:00 p.m.	vs North Dakota State*		SECN+	Hawkins Field • Nashville, Tennessee	**W** 10–0^{(8)}	**Casoliba** (1–0)	Marks (1–2)	None	2,753	10–6	—
March 8	1:00 p.m.	vs North Dakota State*		SECN+	Hawkins Field • Nashville, Tennessee	**L** 2–5	Szabo (1–0)	**Taylor** (0–3)	None	2,832	10–7	—
March 10	6:00 p.m.	vs Indiana State*		SECN+	Hawkins Field • Nashville, Tennessee	**W** 14–6	**Bristow** (1–0)	Suriel (0–3)	None	3,053	11–7	—
March 13	6:00 p.m.	vs No. 13 LSU		SECN+	Hawkins Field • Nashville, Tennessee	**W** 13–12	**Schlote** (1–0)	Guidry (3–2)	None	3,442	12–7	1–0
March 14	7:00 p.m.	vs No. 13 LSU		SECN	Hawkins Field • Nashville, Tennessee	**W** 11–3	**Nadeau** (1–0)	Moore (3–2)	None	3,442	13–7	2–0
March 15	3:00 p.m.	vs No. 13 LSU		ESPN2	Hawkins Field • Nashville, Tennessee	**L** 9–16	Sheerin (2–0)	**Seiber** (2–1)	None	3,442	13–8	2–1
March 17	6:00 p.m.	vs Indiana*		SECN+	Hawkins Field • Nashville, Tennessee	**L** 1–5	Linn (2–0)	**Kranzler** (1–3)	None	2,786	13–9	—
March 20	7:00 p.m.	at No. 6 Mississippi State		SECN	Dudy Noble Field • Starkville, Mississippi	**L** 2–4	Gleason (2–0)	**Fennell** (2–1)	Davis (3)	14,649	13–10	2–2
March 21	6:00 p.m.	at No. 6 Mississippi State		SECN+	Dudy Noble Field • Starkville, Mississippi	**L** 2–7	Valincius (5–0)	**Nadeau** (1–1)	None	14,834	13–11	2–3
March 22	1:00 p.m.	at No. 6 Mississippi State		SECN+	Dudy Noble Field • Starkville, Mississippi	**L** 7–17^{(7)}	Stone (4–0)	**Baird** (0–1)	None	12,207	13–12	2–4
March 24	6:00 p.m.	vs Tennessee Tech*		SECN+	Hawkins Field • Nashville, Tennessee	**W** 15–5^{(8)}	**Schlote** (2–0)	Kirby (0–1)	None	2,827	14–12	—
March 27	7:00 p.m.	vs No. 21 Tennessee		ESPNU	Hawkins Field • Nashville, Tennessee	**W** 3–2^{(10)}	**Seiber** (3–1)	Kuhns (1–3)	None	3,442	15–12	3–4
March 28	4:00 p.m.	vs No. 21 Tennessee		SECN	Hawkins Field • Nashville, Tennessee	**W** 6–5^{(16)}	**Taylor** (1–3)	Frederick (4–1)	None	3,442	16–12	4–4
March 29	11:00 a.m.	vs No. 21 Tennessee		ESPN2	Hawkins Field • Nashville, Tennessee	**W** 16–15	**Seiber** (4–1)	Krenzel (1–2)	None	3,442	17–12	5–4
March 31	6:00 p.m.	vs Belmont*		SECN+	Hawkins Field • Nashville, Tennessee	**W** 11–3	**Hamilton** (1–0)	Perry (0–4)	None	3,115	18–12	—

April (9–8)
(Home; 5–4; Away: 4–4)

Date	Time (CST)	Opponent	Rank	TV	Venue	Score	Win	Loss	Save	Attendance	Overall record	SEC record
April 2	6:00 p.m.	at No. 20 Texas A&M		SECN+	Olsen Field at Blue Bell Park • College Station, Texas	**W** 14–8	**Seiber** (5–1)	Sdao (3–2)	**Baird** (1)	5,543	19–12	6–4
April 3 (DH 1)	2:00 p.m.	at No. 20 Texas A&M		SECN+	Olsen Field at Blue Bell Park • College Station, Texas	**L** 4–8	Lyons (4–0)	**Nadeau** (1–2)	None	5,949	19–13	6–5
April 3 (DH 2)	6:00 p.m.	at No. 20 Texas A&M		SECN+	Olsen Field at Blue Bell Park • College Station, Texas	**L** 0–12^{(7)}	**Sims** (4–0)	**Stillman** (0–1)	None	6,640	19–14	6–6
April 7	6:00 p.m.	vs Eastern Kentucky*		SECN+	Hawkins Field • Nashville, Tennessee	**W** 3–0	**Faulkner** (2–0)	Briese (0–2)	**Baird** (2)	3,151	20–14	—
April 9	6:00 p.m.	vs No. 16 Oklahoma		SECN	Hawkins Field • Nashville, Tennessee	**W** 10–5	**Fennell** (3–1)	Mercurius (5–4)	**Baird** (3)	3,442	21–14	7–6
April 10	6:00 p.m.	vs No. 16 Oklahoma		SECN+	Hawkins Field • Nashville, Tennessee	**L** 11–13	Collier (1–1)	**Taylor** (1–4)	Cleveland (5)	3,442	21–15	7–7
April 11	1:00 p.m.	vs No. 16 Oklahoma		SECN+	Hawkins Field • Nashville, Tennessee	**L** 5–6	Bixby (2–0)	**Schlote** (2–1)	Cleveland (6)	3,442	21–16	7–8
April 14	6:00 p.m.	at Lipscomb*		ESPN+	Dugan Field • Nashville, Tennessee	**W** 15–1	**Stillman** (1–1)	Trautner (0–2)	None	1,027	22–16	—
April 17	5:30 p.m.	at Kentucky		SECN+	Kentucky Proud Park • Lexington, Kentucky	**L** 2–5	Adcock (4–1)	**Baird** (0–2)	None	4,416	22–17	7–9
April 18	1:00 p.m.	at Kentucky		SECN+	Kentucky Proud Park • Lexington, Kentucky	**W** 8–7	**Kranzler** (2–3)	Bennett (1–2)	**Seiber** (1)	3,489	23–17	8–9
April 19	12:00 p.m.	at Kentucky		SECN+	Kentucky Proud Park • Lexington, Kentucky	**W** 13–6	**Stillman** (2–1)	Mattison (2–1)	**Baird** (4)	3,709	24–17	9–9
April 21	6:00 p.m.	vs Xavier*		SECN+	Hawkins Field • Nashville, Tennessee	**W** 11–1^{(8)}	**Schlote** (3–1)	Boyle (0–1)	None	3,181	25–17	—
April 24	6:00 p.m.	vs No. 4 Texas		SECN+	Hawkins Field • Nashville, Tennessee	**L** 4–11	Volantis (6–0)	**Fennell** (3–2)	None	3,442	25–18	9–10
April 25	7:00 p.m.	vs No. 4 Texas		SECN	Hawkins Field • Nashville, Tennessee	**W** 6–0	**Guth** (2–1)	Riojas (5–2)	**Baird** (5)	3,442	26–18	10–10
April 26	12:00 p.m.	vs No. 4 Texas		ESPN2	Hawkins Field • Nashville, Tennessee	**L** 3–4^{(10)}	Cozart (6–0)	**Baird** (0–3)	None	3,442	26–19	10–11
April 28	6:00 p.m.	vs Middle Tennessee*		SECN+	Hawkins Field • Nashville, Tennessee	**W** 9–1	**Hamilton** (2–0)	Albarran (0–1)	None	3,009	27–19	—
April 30	6:00 p.m.	at No. 24 Alabama		ESPNU	Sewell-Thomas Stadium • Tuscaloosa, Alabama	**L** 4–5	Heiberger (3–2)	**Baird** (0–4)	None	3,639	27–20	10–12

May (5–4)
(Home; 4–0; Away: 1–4)

Date	Time (CST)	Opponent	Rank	TV	Venue	Score	Win	Loss	Save	Attendance	Overall record	SEC record
May 1	6:00 p.m.	at No. 24 Alabama		SECN+	Sewell-Thomas Stadium • Tuscaloosa, Alabama	**L** 0–5	Adams (5–3)	**Stillman** (2–2)	Crowther (2)	3,469	27–21	10–13
May 2	1:00 p.m.	at No. 24 Alabama		SECN+	Sewell-THomas Stadium • Tuscalossa, Alabama	**L** 5–8	Upchurch (6–3)	**Nadeau** (1–3)	Banks (6)	4,258	27–22	10–14
May 5	7:00 p.m.	vs Louisville*		ESPN2	Hawkins Field • Nashville, Tennessee	**W** 12–6	**Shorey** (1–0)	Hartman (3–2)	None	3,100	28–22	—
May 8	6:00 p.m.	at Missouri		SECN+	Taylor Stadium • Columbia, Missouri	**L** 7–8^{(10)}	Villarreal (2–1)	**Baird** (0–5)	None	1,086	28–23	10–15
May 9	4:00 p.m.	at Missouri		SECN+	Taylor Stadium • Columbia, Missouri	**W** 11–8^{(11)}	**Nadeau** (2–3)	Lawrence (2–2)	None	2,101	29–23	11–15
May 10	1:00 p.m.	at Missouri		SECN+	Taylor Stadium • Columbia, Missouri	**L** 1–4	Salas (1–0)	**Hamilton** (2–1)	Rosand (1)	1,351	29–24	11–16
May 14	6:00 p.m.	vs South Carolina		SECN+	Hawkins Field • Nashville, Tennessee	**W** 9–1	**Fennell** (4–2)	Phillips (3–8)	None	3,076	30–24	12–16
May 15	6:00 p.m.	vs South Carolina		SECN+	Hawkins Field • Nashville, Tennessee	**W** 9–5	**Shorey** (2–0)	Valentin (1–5)	**Nadeau** (1)	3,161	31–24	13–16
May 16	1:00 p.m.	vs South Carolina		SECN+	Hawkins Field • Nashville, Tennessee	**W** 5–3	**Stillman** (3–2)	Philpott (0–5)	**Kranzler** (1)	3,106	32–24	14–16

Postseason (1–1)
SEC Tournament (1–1)

Date	Time (CST)	Opponent	Seed	TV	Venue	Score	Win	Loss	Save	Attendance	Overall record	Tournament record
May 19	1:00 p.m.	vs (13) Kentucky	(12)	SECN	Hoover Metropolitan Stadium • Hoover, Alabama	**W** 8–5	**Kranzler** (3–3)	Jelkin (8–3)	None	6,748	33–24	1–0
May 20	1:00 p.m.	vs (5); No. 18 Florida	(12)	SECN	Hoover Metropolitan Stadium	**L** 3–8	Barberi (4–2)	**Seiber** (5–2)	None	8,352	33–25	1–1

"#" represents ranking. All rankings from D1 Baseball Poll on the date of the contest.
"()" represents postseason seeding in the SEC Tournament or NCAA Regional, respectively.
= Win, = Loss, = Canceled/Postponed
Bold = **Vanderbilt Commodores team member**
* = Non-Conference Game
Schedule Source:

== Record vs. conference opponents ==
Blank are not scheduled. Blue are home games, otherwise away.

2026 SEC baseball records Source: 2026 SEC baseball game results, 2026 SEC baseball schedule
Tm	W–L	ALA	ARK	AUB	FLA	UGA	KEN	LSU	MSU	MIZ	OKL	OMS	SCA	TEN	TEX	TAM	VAN	Tm	SR	SW
ALA	18–12		0–3	3–0	3–0	.	0–3	.	.	.	2–1	2–1	3–0	1–2	1–2	.	3–0	ALA	6–4	4–2
ARK	17–13	3–0		1–2	0–3	1–2	2–1	.	2–1	2–1	2–1	2–1	2–1	.	.	.	.	ARK	7–3	1–1
AUB	17–13	0–3	2–1		2–1	1–2	2–1	.	2–1	3–0	2–1	.	.	.	1–2	2–1	.	AUB	7–3	1–1
FLA	18–12	0–3	3–0	1–2		2–1	2–1	3–0	.	.	2–1	1–2	3–0	.	.	1–2	.	FLA	6–4	3–1
UGA	23–7	.	2–1	2–1	1–2		.	3–0	3–0	3–0	.	2–1	3–0	2–1	.	2–1	.	UGA	9–1	4–0
KEN	13–17	3–0	1–2	1–2	1–2	.		1–2	.	1–2	.	1–2	1–2	2–1	.	.	1–2	KEN	2–8	1–0
LSU	9–21	.	.	.	0–3	0–3	2–1		0–3	.	1–2	0–3	3–0	2–1	.	0–3	1–2	LSU	3–7	1–5
MSU	16–14	.	1–2	1–2	.	0–3	.	3–0		.	.	3–0	3–0	0–3	1–2	1–2	3–0	MSU	4–6	4–2
MIZ	6–24	.	1–2	0–3	.	0–3	2–1	.	.		0–3	.	0–3	1–2	0–3	0–3	2–1	MIZ	2–8	0–6
OKL	14–16	1–2	1–2	1–2	1–2	.	.	2–1	.	3–0		.	.	1–2	0–3	2–1	2–1	OKL	4–6	1–1
OMS	15–15	1–2	1–2	.	2–1	1–2	2–1	3–0	0–3	.	.		.	2–1	1–2	2–1	.	OMS	5–5	1–1
SCA	7–23	0–3	1–2	.	0–3	0–3	2–1	0–3	0–3	3–0	.	.		.	1–2	.	0–3	SCA	2–8	1–6
TEN	15–15	2–1	.	.	.	1–2	1–2	1–2	3–0	2–1	2–1	1–2	.		2–1	.	0–3	TEN	5–5	1–1
TEX	19–10	2–1	.	2–1	.	.	.	.	2–1	3–0	3–0	2–1	2–1	1–2		0–2	2–1	TEX	8–2	2–0
TAM	18–11	.	.	1–2	2–1	1–2	.	3–0	2–1	3–0	1–2	1–2	.	.	2–0		2–1	TAM	6–4	2–0
VAN	14–16	0–3	.	.	.	.	2–1	2–1	0–3	1–2	1–2	.	3–0	3–0	1–2	1–2		VAN	4–6	2–2
Tm	W–L	ALA	ARK	AUB	FLA	UGA	KEN	LSU	MSU	MIZ	OKL	OMS	SCA	TEN	TEX	TAM	VAN	Team	SR	SW

Updated for entire regular season. Texas at Texas A&M, one game cancelled.
Tie breakers: ALA>FLA hd to hd, AUB>ARK hd to hd, OMS>TEN hd to hd, OKL>VAN hd to hd.

== Rankings ==
Ranking movements Legend: ██ Increase in ranking ██ Decrease in ranking — = Not ranked RV = Received votes т = Tied with team above or below
	Week																
Poll	Pre	1	2	3	4	5	6	7	8	9	10	11	12	13	14	15	Final
Coaches'	18	18*	22т	RV	—	RV	—	RV	—	RV							
Baseball America	17	—	25	—	—	—	—	—	—	—							
NCBWA†	18	RV	RV	RV	RV	RV	—	RV	—	—							
D1Baseball	23	—	—	—	—	—	—	—	—	—							
Perfect Game	19	24	22	—	—	—	—	—	—	—							

† NCBWA ranks 30 teams in their preseason poll, but only ranks 25 teams weekly during the season.
* A new poll was not released for this week, so for comparison purposes, the previous week's ranking is inserted in this week's slot.
