= Justin Lebron =

American baseball player (born 2004)

Cincinnati Reds
- Shortstop
- Born: November 3, 2004 (age 21); The Bronx, New York, U.S.
- Bats: Right Throws: Right
- Stats at Baseball Reference

Justin Nathaniel Lebron (born November 3, 2004) is an American professional baseball shortstop in the Cincinnati Reds organization.

== Amateur career ==
Lebron was born in The Bronx, New York and moved to Miramar, Florida when he was four years old. He attended Pembroke Pines Charter High School in Pembroke Pines, Florida his first two years of high school before transferring to Archbishop Edward A. McCarthy High School in Southwest Ranches, Florida. He committed to the University of Alabama to play college baseball.

As a freshman at Alabama in 2024, Lebron started all 57 games, hitting .338/.429/.546 with 12 home runs and 37 runs batted in (RBI) and was named a freshman All-American and first team All-SEC. After the season, he played for the United States national baseball team. Lebron returned to Alabama as the starting shortstop his sophomore year in 2025. In 2025, he played collegiate summer baseball with the Bourne Braves of the Cape Cod Baseball League.

== Professional career ==
Lebron was drafted by the Cincinnati Reds with the 18th pick of the 2026 Major League Baseball draft. On July 16, Lebron signed with the Reds for a signing bonus of $5 million.
