= Aidan King =

Florida Gator baseball pitcher

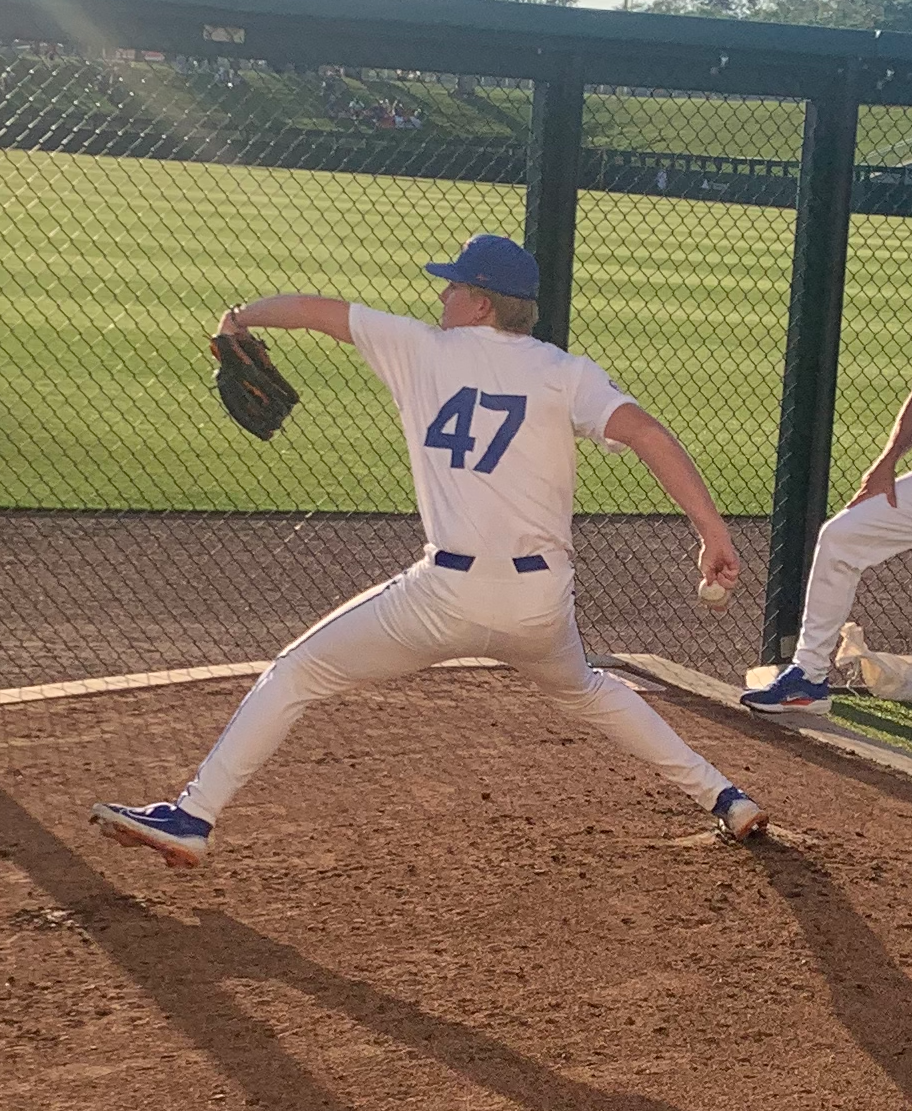
- King with the Florida Gators in 2026

Florida Gators – No. 47
- Pitcher
- Born: June 10, 2006 (age 20); Jacksonville, Florida, U.S.
- Bats: Left Throws: Right
- Stats at Baseball Reference

Career highlights and awards
- Unanimous First-team Freshman All-American (2025); SEC All-Freshman Team (2025); SEC Pitcher of the Year (2026); SEC All-SEC Team (2026)

Aidan Christopher King (born June 10, 2006) is an American college baseball pitcher for the Florida Gators.

== Early life ==
King attended Bishop Snyder High School in Jacksonville, Florida. As a senior in 2024, he led the state of Florida for strikeouts with 144. He posted a 10–1 record with a 1.06 earned run average (ERA). In one particular game he managed 20 strikeouts against 24 batters. He was recognized as the All-First Coast Baseball Player of the Year.

== College career ==
King signed to play college baseball at Florida. Although originally recruited as a relief pitcher, King managed to work his way into the rotation after an injury to Pierce Coppola. His first start was against Harvard, where he threw six scoreless innings. King eventually earned the second spot in the rotation. He had a standout game against Texas, pitching seven scoreless innings on 110 pitches with nine strikeouts. He ended the season with a program-leading 2.58 ERA and a 7–2 record.

King was named to Baseball America's 2027 Major League Baseball draft top 10 watchlist, along with his teammate Brendan Lawson. He recorded his first win of the season in his first start against UAB, pitching six scoreless innings. During his first five games of the season, he allowed no earned runs through 23 1/3 innings. Before Florida's series against Georgia, he was promoted to the top spot in the team's weekend rotation. He pitched six perfect innings against Georgia before eventually giving up 2 earned runs.
