= Caden Glauber =

American baseball player (born 2008)

North Carolina Tar Heels – No. 27
- Relief pitcher
- Born: January 10, 2008 (age 18); Charlotte, North Carolina, U.S.
- Bats: Right Throws: Right

Caden Beau Glauber (born January 10, 2008) is an American college baseball relief pitcher for the North Carolina Tar Heels.

== Early life ==
Glauber grew up in Jersey Shore with his parents Mary and Keith, along with his two older brothers. Keith spent seven years in Minor League Baseball, and briefly played for the Cincinnati Reds. Glauber and his family moved to Fort Mill, South Carolina, where he would later attend the local Catawba Ridge High School.

Glauber committed to play college baseball at the University of North Carolina at Chapel Hill on October 31st of his freshman year in high school, before he'd played a single game for Catawba Ridge. In 2023, Glauber recorded a save in game 3 of the SCHSL 4-A baseball championship game en route to Catawba Ridge winning its first state championship in baseball. Shortly before his junior year, Glauber accepted an offer from North Carolina to enroll following the school year, with him completing two years' worth of coursework in one school year to graduate from Catawba Ridge a year early.

== College career ==
Entering his freshman year, Glauber was ranked as the seventh-best incoming freshman in the Atlantic Coast Conference (ACC) by D1Baseball. Glauber made his first appearance in the season opener against Indiana, surrendering two runs while contributing three walks and one strikeout. On February 24, Glauber earned his first win, pitching 5.0 innings with five strikeouts and allowing one baserunner via a hit by pitch against North Carolina A&T. Towards the end of March, Glauber earned praise for his pitching performance, with Baseball America tabbing him as potentially the best freshman pitcher in college baseball. On April 3, Glauber had his longest outing of the season, throwing 97 pitches in 5 1/3 innings with two hits and four walks along with five strikeouts in a win against Boston College. The following week, Glauber was named ACC Freshman of the Week for his effort on April 11 against Clemson, in which he pitched 6 innings while allowing five hits and three walks along with six strikeouts in a 14.0-inning win. During the season, Glauber was named as a semifinalist for both the National Pitcher of the Year Award and the Dick Howser Trophy. On June 7, in the elimination game of the Chapel Hill Super Regional against USC, Glauber pitched a career-high 7 1/3 innings, with six hits and three walks along with another career-high of eleven strikeouts in a win for North Carolina. Over the course of the season, Glauber helped North Carolina reach the College World Series, as the team won 29 of the 30 games Glauber pitched in during the year, with the only loss being the championship elimination game against Oklahoma. For his efforts during the year, Glauber received the ACC Freshman of the Year Award, the Co-Freshman Pitcher of the Year Award by Baseball America, and the Freshman of the Year Award by D1Baseball. Glauber was also named as a consensus All-American.

Shortly after the conclusion of the 2026 season, Glauber announced his return to North Carolina for his sophomore year.

Glauber is considered a top prospect for the 2028 Major League Baseball draft.
