= 2026 Oklahoma Sooners baseball team =

American college baseball season

2026 Oklahoma Sooners baseball

College World Series National champions NCAA Lawrence Super Regional champions NCAA Atlanta Regional champions Shriners Children's College Showdown champions
- Conference: Southeastern Conference

Ranking
- Coaches: No. 1
- D1Baseball.com: No. 1
- Record: 43–23 (14–16 SEC)
- Head coach: Skip Johnson (9th season)
- Associate head coach: Reggie Willits (3rd season)
- Assistant coaches: Todd Butler (3rd season); Russell Raley (4th season)
- Home stadium: Kimrey Family Stadium

2026 Southeastern Conference baseball standings
	Conf.				Overall
Team	W		L	PCT	W		L	PCT
No. 3 Georgia ‍†‍‡‍^{y}	23	–	7	.767	53	–	14	.791
No. 5 Texas ‍‍‍^{y}	19	–	10	.655	46	–	15	.754
No. 17 Texas A&M ‍‍‍^{y}	18	–	11	.621	41	–	16	.719
No. 6 Alabama ‍‍‍^{y}	18	–	12	.600	42	–	21	.667
No. 16 Florida ‍‍‍^{y}	18	–	12	.600	41	–	21	.661
No. 9 Auburn ‍‍‍^{y}	17	–	13	.567	42	–	22	.656
No. 23 Arkansas ‍‍‍^{y}	17	–	13	.567	41	–	22	.651
No. 14 Mississippi State ‍‍‍^{y}	16	–	14	.533	43	–	19	.694
No. 7 Ole Miss ‍‍‍^{y}	15	–	15	.500	41	–	23	.641
Tennessee ‍‍‍^{y}	15	–	15	.500	38	–	22	.633
No. 1 Oklahoma ‍‍‍^{y}	14	–	16	.467	43	–	23	.652
Vanderbilt ‍‍‍	14	–	16	.467	33	–	25	.569
Kentucky ‍‍‍^{y}	13	–	17	.433	33	–	23	.589
LSU ‍‍‍	9	–	21	.300	30	–	28	.517
South Carolina ‍‍‍	7	–	23	.233	22	–	35	.386
Missouri ‍‍‍	6	–	24	.200	24	–	31	.436
† – Conference champion ‡ – Tournament champion y – Invited to the NCAA Tournament; As of June 22, 2026; Rankings from D1Baseball

The 2026 Oklahoma Sooners baseball team represented the University of Oklahoma during the 2026 NCAA Division I baseball season. The Sooners played their home games at Kimrey Family Stadium in their second season as members of the SEC. They were led by head coach Skip Johnson, in his ninth season at Oklahoma.

== Previous season ==
The 2025 Oklahoma Sooners baseball team finished the season 38–22, and 14–16 in SEC play. In the 2025 Southeastern Conference baseball tournament, they won their first two games before ultimately losing to Vanderbilt 1–6 in the quarterfinals. The team received an at-large bid in the Chapel Hill Regional. The Sooners defeated Nebraska 7–4 in their opener. Subsequently, they lost in the semifinals to North Carolina, 5–11. The Sooners bounced back, defeating Nebraska decisively 17–1, and then beating North Carolina once, 9–5, drawing closer to Super Regional Hopes. However, they fell short the next day, losing to North Carolina in game seven of the regional 4–14, ending their season.

== Preseason ==
=== SEC coaches poll ===
SEC coaches poll
Predicted finish	Team	Votes (1st place)
1	LSU	231 (9)
2	Texas	214 (1)
3	Mississippi State	205 (4)
4	Arkansas	203 (2)
5	Auburn	175
6	Tennessee	162
7	Florida	156
8	Vanderbilt	151
9	Georgia	133
10	Ole Miss	110
11	Kentucky	99
12	Alabama	87
13	Texas A&M	86
14	Oklahoma	84
15	South Carolina	49
16	Missouri	31

== Roster ==
2026 Oklahoma Sooners baseball team
Players
Coaches

#	Pos.	Name	B/T	Height	Weight	Year	Home town
1	OF	Jason Walk	S/R	5 ft 10 in (1.78 m)	166 lb (75 kg)	Jr	Acworth, GA
2	INF	Myles Davis	R/R	6 ft 0 in (1.83 m)	213 lb (97 kg)	So	Marion, IA
3	UTL	Cayden Brumbaugh	R/R	5 ft 9 in (1.75 m)	182 lb (83 kg)	Sr	Edmond, OK
4	OF	Alec Blair	L/L	6 ft 6 in (1.98 m)	195 lb (88 kg)	Fr	Lafayette, CA
5	C	Nolan Stevens	L/L	6 ft 2 in (1.88 m)	216 lb (98 kg)	Jr	Elk Grove, CA
6	INF	Kyle Branch	R/R	5 ft 11 in (1.8 m)	182 lb (83 kg)	So	Lucas, TX
7	INF	Jaxon Willits	S/R	6 ft 0 in (1.83 m)	203 lb (92 kg)	Jr	Fort Cobb, OK
8	INF	Uriah Walters	R/R	6 ft 2 in (1.88 m)	193 lb (88 kg)	Jr	Prosper, TX
9	INF	Camden Johnson	L/R	6 ft 0 in (1.83 m)	176 lb (80 kg)	Jr	Boerne, TX
10	UTL	Brendan Brock	R/R	6 ft 3 in (1.91 m)	200 lb (91 kg)	Jr	Mascoutah, IL
11	OF	Gerardo Prado	R/R	6 ft 3 in (1.91 m)	190 lb (86 kg)	Jr	San Juan, PR
12	RHP	Kadyn Leon	R/R	6 ft 0 in (1.83 m)	190 lb (86 kg)	So	Austin, TX
13	UTL	Connor Larkin	L/L	6 ft 3 in (1.91 m)	194 lb (88 kg)	Fr	Cherry Hills Village, CO
16	INF	Dayton Tockey	L/L	6 ft 1 in (1.85 m)	230 lb (104 kg)	Sr	Fort Worth, TX
17	OF	Dasan Harris	L/L	6 ft 1 in (1.85 m)	181 lb (82 kg)	Jr	Plano, TX
18	LHP	Gavyn Jones	L/L	6 ft 1 in (1.85 m)	206 lb (93 kg)	Jr	White Oak, TX
19	RHP	Jaxon Grossman	R/R	6 ft 4 in (1.93 m)	227 lb (103 kg)	Jr	Haiku, HI
20	OF	Trey Gambill	L/R	5 ft 11 in (1.8 m)	200 lb (91 kg)	Sr	Alpine, UT
21	OF	Drew Dickerson	R/R	6 ft 4 in (1.93 m)	210 lb (95 kg)	So	Lee's Summit, MO
22	RHP	LJ Mercurius	R/R	6 ft 2 in (1.88 m)	175 lb (79 kg)	Jr	Las Vegas, NV
23	RHP	Xander Mercurius	R/R	5 ft 10 in (1.78 m)	186 lb (84 kg)	Fr	Las Vegas, NV
25	RHP	Mason Bixby	R/R	6 ft 7 in (2.01 m)	239 lb (108 kg)	Jr	San Antonio, TX
27	RHP	Drew Rerick	R/R	6 ft 4 in (1.93 m)	243 lb (110 kg)	So	Fargo, ND
29	LHP	Jaden Barfield	L/L	6 ft 0 in (1.83 m)	216 lb (98 kg)	So	Pearland, TX
30	RHP	Michael Catalano	R/R	6 ft 0 in (1.83 m)	200 lb (91 kg)	So	Frisco, TX
31	LHP	Cameron Johnson	L/L	6 ft 6 in (1.98 m)	256 lb (116 kg)	Jr	Upper Marlboro, MD
32	RHP	Brisco Smith	S/R	6 ft 1 in (1.85 m)	169 lb (77 kg)	Fr	Marlow, OK
33	RHP	Isaac Williams	R/R	6 ft 1 in (1.85 m)	200 lb (91 kg)	Jr	Fleming Island, FL
35	RHP	Jason Bodin	L/R	6 ft 3 in (1.91 m)	193 lb (88 kg)	Jr	Orange, TX
37	RHP	Nick Wesloski	R/R	6 ft 3 in (1.91 m)	219 lb (99 kg)	Fr	McKinney, TX
39	LHP	Trent Collier	L/L	6 ft 2 in (1.88 m)	241 lb (109 kg)	So	Prosper, TX
41	C	Gunnar Dillard	R/R	6 ft 0 in (1.83 m)	200 lb (91 kg)	Fr	San Angelo, TX
42	RHP	Reid Hensley	R/R	6 ft 0 in (1.83 m)	214 lb (97 kg)	Gr	Lufkin, TX
48	C	Deiten Lachance	R/R	6 ft 5 in (1.96 m)	231 lb (105 kg)	Jr	Sherbrooke, QC
49	RHP	Jackson Cleveland	L/R	6 ft 2 in (1.88 m)	206 lb (93 kg)	Sr	Deer Park, TX
54	LHP	Nate Smithburg (redshirt)	L/L	6 ft 2 in (1.88 m)	257 lb (117 kg)	Jr	Libertyville, IA
99	LHP	Cord Rager	L/L	6 ft 6 in (1.98 m)	237 lb (108 kg)	Fr	Maypearl, TX

Head coach

Skip Johnson

Assistant coach(es)

Reggie Willits
Todd Butler
Russell Raley
Britt Bonneau

Legend

- (C) Team captain
- (S) Suspended
- (I) Ineligible
- Injured
- Current redshirt

=== Starters ===
Lineup
Pos.	No.	Player.	Year
CF	1	Jason Walk	Junior
3B	9	Camden Johnson	Junior
C	48	Deiten Lachance	Junior
SS	7	Jaxon Willits	Junior
DH	20	Trey Gambill	Senior
LF	10	Brendan Brock	Junior
RF	17	Dasan Harris	Junior
1B	16	Dayton Tockey	Senior
2B	6	Kyle Branch	Sophomore
LHP	99	Cord Rager	Freshman

Updated: 6/20/2026

== Offseason ==
=== Departures ===
==== 2025 MLB Draft ====
2025 Oklahoma Draft Class (Oklahoma Sooners)
Round	Pick in Round	Overall Pick	Player	Position	MLB Organization	Source	Notes
1	15	15	Kyson Witherspoon	P	Boston Red Sox		
2	19	62	Malachi Witherspoon	P	Detroit Tigers		
3	7	82	Easton Carmichael	C	Pittsburgh Pirates		
4	15	120	Cade Crossland	P	St. Louis Cardinals		
8	25	250	James Hitt	P	San Diego Padres		
11	30	345	Dylan Tate	P	Los Angeles Dodgers		
15	2	437	Dylan Crooks	P	Colorado Rockies		
19	8	563	Brandon Cain	P	Pittsburgh Pirates		
N/A	N/A	N/A	Dawson Willis	SS	San Diego Padres		Free Agent

==== Outgoing transfers ====
Outgoing transfers
Name	Number	Pos.	Height	Weight	Hometown	Year	New school	Source
Christian Hoffman	3	OF	6'3	230	Albuquerque, NM	JR	Hawaii	
Mason Hamlin	4	INF	6'2	205	Elbert, CO	JR	Utah Valley	
Jacob Gholston	11	RHP	6'7	225	Flower Mound, TX	SO	Charlotte	
Ryley Leininger	12	INF	6'2	225	Georgetown, TX	FR	Blinn College	
Jackson Kircher	14	RHP/OF	6'4	215	Little Rock, AR	FR	Arkansas	
Landon Victorian	27	RHP	6'3	180	Lake Charles, LA	FR	Louisiana	
Brayden Horton	28	IF/OF	6'0	200	Sayre, PA	JR	Costal Carolina	
Berkeley Roddy	33	RHP	6'3	220	Fort Worth, TX	FR	Grayson College	
Beau Sampson	34	LHP	6'6	226	St. George, UT	SO	Tulane	
Mitch Haythorn	37	RHP	6'0	205	Eaton, CO	FR	Northern Colorado	
Cole Hansen	39	C	6'1	210	Norco, CA	FR	Cal Baptist	
Sam Christiansen	40	INF/OF	6'1	212	Mesa, AZ	R-SO	Alabama	
Reid Graham	41	INF	6'6	220	Waxahachie, TX	FR	Tyler Junior College	
Jordan Stribling	45	LHP	6'6	220	Highland Park, TX	FR	McLennan CC	

==== Outgoing players ====
Outgoing players
Name	Number	Pos.	Height	Weight	Hometown	Year	Notes	Source
Taylor Tatum	8	OF	5'10	208	Longview, TX	FR	Switched to football	
Scott Mudler	22	C	6'2	220	Johns Creek, GA	SR	Graduated	
Grant Stevens	36	LHP	5'9	199	Elk Grove, CA	GR	Medically retired	
James Nesta	58	RHP	6'3	217	Huntersville, NC	R-FR	Switched to football	

=== Acquisitions ===
==== Incoming transfers ====
Incoming transfers
Name	Number	Pos.	Height	Weight	Hometown	Year	Previous school	Source
Myles Davis	2	INF	6'0	213	Marion, IA	SO	State College of Florida	
Cayden Brumbaugh	3	UTL	5'9	182	Edmond, OK	SR	Nebraska	
Nolan Stevens	5	OF/LHP	6'2	216	Elk Grove, CA	JR	Mississippi State	
Uriah Walters	8	INF	6'2	193	Prosper, TX	JR	Weatherford College	
Camden Johnson	9	INF	6'0	176	Boerne, TX	JR	Wichita State	
Brendan Brock	10	C/OF	6'3	200	Mascoutah, IL	JR	Southwestern Illinois College	
Gerardo Prado	11	OF	6'3	190	San Juan, PR	JR	Amarillo College	
Kadyn Leon	12	RHP	6'0	190	Austin, TX	SO	McLennan CC	
Jaxon Grossman	19	RHP	6'4	227	Haiku, HI	JR	Salt Lake Community College	
LJ Mercurius	22	RHP	6'2	175	Las Vegas, NV	JR	UNLV	
Mason Bixby	25	RHP	6'7	239	San Antonio, TX	JR	TCU	
Drew Rerick	27	RHP	6'4	243	Fargo, ND	SO	Texas	
Isaac Williams	33	RHP	6'1	200	Fleming Island, FL	JR	UCF	
Trent Collier	39	LHP	6'2	241	Prosper, TX	SO	Weatherford College	
Deiten Lachance	48	C	6'5	231	Sherbrooke, QC	JR	McLennan CC	
Jackson Cleveland	49	RHP	6'2	206	Deer Park, TX	SR	Miami	

==== Incoming recruits ====
2026 Oklahoma Recruits
Name	Number	Pos.	Height	Weight	Hometown	High School	Source
Alec Blair	4	OF	6'6	195	Lafayette, CA	De La Salle (CA)	
Conor Larkin	13	UTL	6'3	194	Cherry Hills Village, CO	Cherry Creek	
Xander Mercurius	23	RHP	5'10	186	Las Vegas, NV	Durango (NV)	
Brisco Smith	32	RHP	6'1	169	Marlow, OK	Duncan	
Nick Wesloski	37	RHP	6'3	219	Mckenny, TX	McKinney Boyd	
Gunnar Dillard	41	C	6'0	200	San Angelo, TX	Wall (TX)	
Cord Rager	99	LHP	6'6	237	Maypearl, TX	Maypearl	

== Schedule and results ==
2026 Oklahoma Sooners baseball game log (43–23)
Regular season (32–20)

February (10–1)
Date	Opponent	Rank	Site/stadium	Score	Win	Loss	Save	TV	Attendance	Overall record	SEC record
Shriners Children's College Showdown
February 13	vs. Texas Tech		Globe Life Field; Arlington, Texas	**W** 10–3	**Johnson** (1–0)	Free (0–1)		FloSports	18,387	1–0	—
February 14	vs. Oklahoma State		Globe Life Field	**W** 10–1	**LJ Mercurius** (1–0)	Pesca (0–1)		FloSports	22,384	2–0	—
February 15	vs. No. 10 TCU		Globe Life Field	**W** 12–2 (7)	**Rager** (1–0)	Davis (0–1)		FloSports	16,951	3–0	—
Amegy Bank College Baseball Series
February 16	vs. New Mexico State	No. 21	Globe Life Field	**W** 10–6	**Williams** (1–0)	Yarc (0–1)		SECN+	250	4–0	—
February 20	Coppin State	No. 21	Kimrey Family Stadium; Norman, Oklahoma	**W** 22–1 (7)	**Johnson** (2–0)	Kirksey (0–2)		SECN+	1,011	5–0	—
February 21	Coppin State	No. 21	Kimrey Family Stadium	**W** 24–0 (7)	**LJ Mercurius** (2–0)	Holland (0–1)		SECN+	1,228	6–0	—
February 22	Coppin State	No. 21	Kimrey Family Stadium	**W** 11–0 (7)	**Rager** (2–0)	Cumming (0–1)		SECN+	1,072	7–0	—
February 24	Arizona State	No. 13	Kimrey Family Stadium	**L** 3–15 (7)	Klecker (2–0)	**Catalano** (0–1)		SECN+	1,413	7–1	—
February 25	Arizona State	No. 13	Kimrey Family Stadium	**W** 4–3	**Cleveland** (1–0)	Schaefer (0–1)		SECN+	1,754	8–1	—
February 27	Gonzaga	No. 13	Kimrey Family Stadium	**W** 14–4 (8)	**Johnson** (3–0)	O'Brien (0–1)		SECN+	2,127	9–1	—
February 28	Gonzaga	No. 13	Kimrey Family Stadium	**W** 11–1 (7)	**LJ Mercurius** (3–0)	Hoffberg (1–2)		SECN+	3,109	10–1	—

March (10–7)
Date	Opponent	Rank	Site/stadium	Score	Win	Loss	Save	TV	Attendance	Overall record	SEC record
March 1	Gonzaga	No. 13	Kimrey Family Stadium	**L** 1–7	Sweum (1–1)	**Rager** (2–1)	Hood (1)	SECN+	1,254	10–2	—
March 3	Dallas Baptist	No. 12	Kimrey Family Stadium	**W** 2–0	**Catalano** (1–1)	Watt (0–1)	**Cleveland** (1)	SECN+	2,806	11–2	—
March 5	Santa Clara	No. 12	Kimrey Family Stadium	**W** 2–1	**Johnson** (4–0)	Meyn (1–1)	**Cleveland** (2)	SECN+	1,309	12–2	—
March 6	Santa Clara	No. 12	Kimrey Family Stadium	Cancelled							
March 7	Santa Clara	No. 12	Kimrey Family Stadium	**W** 8–0	**LJ Mercurius** (4–0)	Gillmore (0–2)		SECN+	1,322	13–2	—
March 8	Santa Clara	No. 12	Kimrey Family Stadium	**W** 8–6	**Bodin** (1–0)	Lanz (0–3)	**Cleveland** (3)	SECN+	1,278	14–2	—
March 11	UT Arlington	No. 9	Kimrey Family Stadium	**W** 6–1	**Bixby** (1–0)	Havern (0–3)	None	SECN+	739	15–2	—
March 13	No. 22 Texas A&M	No. 9	Kimrey Family Stadium	**W** 8–7	**Bodin** (2–0)	Freshcorn (2–1)	None	SECN+	3,727	16–2	1–0
March 14	No. 22 Texas A&M	No. 9	Kimrey Family Stadium	**L** 5–9	Moss (3–1)	**LJ Mercurius** (4–1)	Freshcorn (3)	SECN+	5,072	16–3	1–1
March 15	No. 22 Texas A&M	No. 9	Kimrey Family Stadium	**W** 12–11	**Bodin** (3–0)	Cunningham (0–1)	Nome	SECN+	3,031	17–3	2–1
March 17	at Southeastern Louisiana	No. 8	Pat Kenelly Diamond at Alumni Field; Hammond, Louisiana	**L** 0–3	Shaffer (1–0)	**Catalano** (1–2)	Todorowski (1)	ESPN+	1,621	17–4	—
March 19	at LSU	No. 8	Alex Box Stadium, Skip Bertman Field; Baton Rouge, Louisiana	**L** 1–7	Evans (2–0)	**Johnson** (3–1)	None	ESPNU	11,217	17–5	2–2
March 20	at LSU	No. 8	Alex Box Stadium, Skip Bertman Field	**W** 4–2	**LJ Mercurius** (5–1)	Moore (3–3)	**Cleveland** (4)	SECN+	12,803	18–5	3–2
March 21	at LSU	No. 8	Alex Box Stadium, Skip Bertman Field	**W** 4–3	**Cleveland** (2–0)	Guidry (3–3)	None	SECN+	12,503	19–5	4–2
March 26	at No. 2 Texas	No. 8	UFCU Disch–Falk Field; Austin, Texas	**L** 0–14 (7)	Riojas (5–0)	**LJ Mercurius** (5–2)	None	SEC Network	7,358	19–6	4–3
March 27	at No. 2 Texas	No. 8	UFCU Disch–Falk Field	**L** 3–4 (10)	Cozart (5–0)	**Cleveland** (2–1)	None	SEC Network	7,990	19–7	4–4
March 28	at No. 2 Texas	No. 8	UFCU Disch–Falk Field	**L** 4–5 (10)	Leffew (2–0)	**Bodin** (3–1)	None	SEC Network	8,059	19–8	4–5
March 31	at Oral Roberts	No. 11	J. L. Johnson Stadium; Tulsa, Oklahoma	**W** 4–0	**Catalano** (2–2)	Asher (0–2)	None	ESPN+	2,011	20–8	—

April (9–6)
Date	Opponent	Rank	Site/stadium	Score	Win	Loss	Save	TV	Attendance	Overall record	SEC record
April 2	No. 16 Alabama	No. 11	Kimrey Family Stadium	**L** 7–10	Fay (6–2)	**LJ Mercurius** (5–3)	Heiberger (2)	SECN+	3,895	20–9	4–6
April 3	No. 16 Alabama	No. 11	Kimrey Family Stadium	**W** 4–2	**Johnson** (4–1)	Adams (4–2)	**Leon** (1)	SECN+	2,571	21–9	5–6
April 4	No. 16 Alabama	No. 11	Kimrey Family Stadium	**L** 2–3	Upchurch (4–2)	**Collier** (0–1)	Banks (5)	SECN+	3,906	21–10	5–7
April 6	at Dallas Baptist	No. 11	Horner Ballpark; Dallas, Texas	**W** 9–3	**Catalano** (3–2)	VanDehatert (0–2)	None	ESPN+	1,270	22–10	—
April 9	at Vanderbilt	No. 16	Hawkins Field; Nashville, Tennessee	**L** 5–10	Fennell (3–1)	**LJ Mercurius** (5–4)	Baird (3)	SEC Network	3,442	22–11	5–8
April 10	at Vanderbilt	No. 16	Hawkins Field	**W** 13–11	**Collier** (1–1)	Taylor (1–4)	**Cleveland** (5)	SECN+	3,442	23–11	6–8
April 11	at Vanderbilt	No. 16	Hawkins Field	**W** 6–5	**Bixby** (2–0)	Schlote (2–1)	**Cleveland** (6)	SECN+	3,442	24–11	7–8
April 14	vs. Oklahoma State	No. 14	Oneok Field; Tulsa, Oklahoma	**L** 3–7 (8)	Phillips (2–2)	**Catalano** (3–3)	None	SECN+	4,901	24–12	—
April 17	Missouri	No. 14	Kimrey Family Stadium	**W** 9–6	**LJ Mercurius** (6–4)	McDevitt (3–4)	None	SECN+	3,212	25–12	8–8
April 18	Missouri	No. 14	Kimrey Family Stadium	**W** 4–0	**Johnson** (5–1)	Kehlenbrink (3–6)	None	SECN+	4,804	26–12	9–8
April 19	Missouri	No. 14	Kimrey Family Stadium	**W** 8–4	**Rager** (3–1)	Pimental (2–1)	None	SECN+	3,519	27–12	10–8
April 21	Oral Roberts	No. 14	Kimrey Family Stadium	**W** 7–6	**Hensley** (1–0)	Johnson (0–1)	**X. Mercurius** (1)	SECN+	2,507	28–12	—
April 24	at No. 11 Auburn	No. 14	Plainsman Park; Auburn, Alabama	**L** 4–6	Alvarez (7–2)	**LJ Mercurius** (6–5)	Sanders (2)	SECN+	5,711	28–13	10–9
April 25	at No. 11 Auburn	No. 14	Plainsman Park	**W** 2–1	**Johnson** (6–1)	Marciano (3–3)	**Leon** (2)	SECN+	5,721	29–13	11–9
April 26	at No. 11 Auburn	No. 14	Plainsman Park	**L** 4–14 (8)	Petrovic (7–1)	**Rager** (3–2)	None	SECN+	5,226	29–14	11–10
April 28	vs. Texas Tech	No. 15	Riders Field; Frisco, Texas	**Canceled (inclement weather)**							

May (3–6)
Date	Opponent	Rank	Site/stadium	Score	Win	Loss	Save	TV	Attendance	Overall record	SEC record
May 1	No. 25 Florida	No. 15	Kimrey Family Stadium	**W** 4–3	**Bodin** (4–1)	Whritenour (2–3)	**Cleveland** (7)	SECN+	3,611	30–14	12–10
May 2	No. 25 Florida	No. 15	Kimrey Family Stadium	**L** 10–4	McDonald (4–1)	**Catalano** (3–4)	Lugo-Canchola (1)	SEC Network	4,679	30–15	12–11
May 3	No. 25 Florida	No. 15	Kimrey Family Stadium	**L** 2–13 (8)	Sandefer (3–2)	**Rager** (3–3)	None	SECN+	3,651	30–16	12–12
May 8	at No. 17 Arkansas	No. 24	Baum–Walker Stadium; Fayetteville, Arkansas	**L** 2–12 (7)	Dietz (7–2)	**LJ Mercurius** (6–6)	None	SECN+	10,158	30–17	12–13
May 9	at No. 17 Arkansas	No. 24	Baum–Walker Stadium	**L** 8–12	McGuire (1–0)	**Cleveland** (2–2)	None	SECN+	10,049	30–18	12–14
May 10	at No. 17 Arkansas	No. 24	Baum–Walker Stadium	**W** 15–10	**Smithburg** (1–0)	Fisher (4–7)	None	SECN+	9,773	31–18	13–14
May 14	vs. Tennessee		Chickasaw Bricktown Ballpark; Oklahoma City, Oklahoma	**L** 7–9	Kuhns (5–4)	**Wesloski** (0–1)	Rhudy (3)	SECN+	3,175	31–19	13–15
May 15	vs. Tennessee		Chickasaw Bricktown Ballpark	**L** 4–9	Blanco (7–3)	**Mercurius** (0–1)	Arvidson (3)	SECN+	3,588	31–20	13–16
May 16	vs. Tennessee		Chickasaw Bricktown Ballpark	**W** 12–9	**Bodin** (5–1)	Day (0–2)	**Cleveland** (8)	SECN+	3,568	32–20	14–16

Postseason (11–3)

SEC Tournament (0–1)
Date	Opponent	Seed	Site/stadium	Score	Win	Loss	Save	TV	Attendance	Overall record	SECT record
May 19	vs. (14) LSU	(11)	Hoover Metropolitan Stadium; Hoover, AL	**L** 2–6	Guidry (5–3)	**Mercurius** (0–2)	Sheerin (5)	SECN	7,617	32–21	0–1

Atlanta Regional (4–1)
Date	Opponent	Seed	Site/stadium	Score	Win	Loss	Save	TV	Attendance	Overall record	Regional record
May 30	vs. (3) The Citadel	(2)	Russ Chandler Stadium; Atlanta, GA	**W** 8–3	**Rager** (4–3)	Buffkin (6–3)	**Mercurius** (1)	ESPNU	3,213	33–21	1–0
May 30	at (1) No. 2 Georgia Tech	(2)	Russ Chandler Stadium	**L** 3–9	McKee (9–1)	**Mercurius** (0–2)	None	ESPN+	3,774	33–22	1–1
May 31	vs. (3) The Citadel	(2)	Russ Chandler Stadium	**W** 15–5	**Wesloski** (1–1)	Coulter (2–3)	None	SECN	3,280	34–22	2–1
May 31	at (1) No. 2 Georgia Tech	(2)	Russ Chandler Stadium	**W** 15–8	**Jones** (1–0)	Gaudette (6–2)	**Mercurius** (2)	ESPN+	3,833	35–22	3–1
June 1	at (1) No. 2 Georgia Tech	(2)	Russ Chandler Stadium	**W** 8–7 ^{(10)}	**Cleveland** (3–2)	McKee (9–2)	None	ESPNU	3,904	36–22	4–1

Lawrence Super Regional (2–0)
Date	Opponent	Seed	Site/stadium	Score	Win	Loss	Save	TV	Attendance	Overall record	Super Regional record
June 6	at (15) No. 13 Kansas		Hoglund Ballpark; Lawrence, KS	**W** 8–1	**Rager** (5–3)	Voegele (6–4)	**Mercurius** (3)	ESPN2	4,415	37–22	1–0
June 7	at (15) No. 13 Kansas		Hoglund Ballpark; Lawrence, KS	**W** 13–2	**Smithburg** (2-0)	Cook (5-2)	None	ESPN2	4,249	38–22	2–0
Note: The original start time was 5:30 p.m. and was delayed to 7:30 p.m. The game was then delayed a second time in the bottom of the third, and resumed the next day at 12:02 p.m.

College World Series (5–1)
Date	Opponent	Seed	Site/stadium	Score	Win	Loss	Save	TV	Attendance	Overall record	CWS record
June 13	vs. (7) No. 16 Alabama		Charles Schwab Field Omaha; Omaha, NE	**W** 9–0	**Rager** (6–3)	Fay (11–5)	None	ESPN	24,579	39–22	1–0
June 15	vs. (3) No. 3 Georgia		Charles Schwab Field Omaha	**W** 4–3	**Mercurius** (1–2)	Akoi (9–2)	**Cleveland** (9)	ESPN	24,455	40–22	2–0
June 17	vs. (3) No. 3 Georgia		Charles Schwab Field Omaha	**W** 11–4	**Wesloski** (2–1)	Farley (8–2)	**Mercurius** (4)	ESPN	24,446	41–22	3–0
June 20	vs. (5) No. 4 North Carolina		Charles Schwab Field Omaha	**W** 9–3	**Cord** (7–3)	DeCaro (11–3)	None	ESPN	24,707	42–22	4–0
June 21	vs. (5) No. 4 North Carolina		Charles Schwab Field Omaha	**L** 2–6	Glauber (12–0)	**Mercurius** (1–3)	None	ABC	24,621	42–23	4–1
June 22	vs. (5) No. 4 North Carolina		Charles Schwab Field Omaha	**W** 13–2	**Mercurius** (7–7)	Rose (5–1)	None	ESPN	23,248	43–23	5–1

- Win
- Loss
- Postponement or cancellation
- Bold: Oklahoma player
- Rankings from D1Baseball.com.
- (#) Tournament seedings in parentheses.

== Record vs. conference opponents ==
Blank are not scheduled. Blue are home games, otherwise away.

2026 SEC baseball records Source: 2026 SEC baseball game results, 2026 SEC baseball schedule
Tm	W–L	ALA	ARK	AUB	FLA	UGA	KEN	LSU	MSU	MIZ	OKL	OMS	SCA	TEN	TEX	TAM	VAN	Tm	SR	SW
ALA	18–12		0–3	3–0	3–0	.	0–3	.	.	.	2–1	2–1	3–0	1–2	1–2	.	3–0	ALA	6–4	4–2
ARK	17–13	3–0		1–2	0–3	1–2	2–1	.	2–1	2–1	2–1	2–1	2–1	.	.	.	.	ARK	7–3	1–1
AUB	17–13	0–3	2–1		2–1	1–2	2–1	.	2–1	3–0	2–1	.	.	.	1–2	2–1	.	AUB	7–3	1–1
FLA	18–12	0–3	3–0	1–2		2–1	2–1	3–0	.	.	2–1	1–2	3–0	.	.	1–2	.	FLA	6–4	3–1
UGA	23–7	.	2–1	2–1	1–2		.	3–0	3–0	3–0	.	2–1	3–0	2–1	.	2–1	.	UGA	9–1	4–0
KEN	13–17	3–0	1–2	1–2	1–2	.		1–2	.	1–2	.	1–2	1–2	2–1	.	.	1–2	KEN	2–8	1–0
LSU	9–21	.	.	.	0–3	0–3	2–1		0–3	.	1–2	0–3	3–0	2–1	.	0–3	1–2	LSU	3–7	1–5
MSU	16–14	.	1–2	1–2	.	0–3	.	3–0		.	.	3–0	3–0	0–3	1–2	1–2	3–0	MSU	4–6	4–2
MIZ	6–24	.	1–2	0–3	.	0–3	2–1	.	.		0–3	.	0–3	1–2	0–3	0–3	2–1	MIZ	2–8	0–6
OKL	14–16	1–2	1–2	1–2	1–2	.	.	2–1	.	3–0		.	.	1–2	0–3	2–1	2–1	OKL	4–6	1–1
OMS	15–15	1–2	1–2	.	2–1	1–2	2–1	3–0	0–3	.	.		.	2–1	1–2	2–1	.	OMS	5–5	1–1
SCA	7–23	0–3	1–2	.	0–3	0–3	2–1	0–3	0–3	3–0	.	.		.	1–2	.	0–3	SCA	2–8	1–6
TEN	15–15	2–1	.	.	.	1–2	1–2	1–2	3–0	2–1	2–1	1–2	.		2–1	.	0–3	TEN	5–5	1–1
TEX	19–10	2–1	.	2–1	.	.	.	.	2–1	3–0	3–0	2–1	2–1	1–2		0–2	2–1	TEX	8–2	2–0
TAM	18–11	.	.	1–2	2–1	1–2	.	3–0	2–1	3–0	1–2	1–2	.	.	2–0		2–1	TAM	6–4	2–0
VAN	14–16	0–3	.	.	.	.	2–1	2–1	0–3	1–2	1–2	.	3–0	3–0	1–2	1–2		VAN	4–6	2–2
Tm	W–L	ALA	ARK	AUB	FLA	UGA	KEN	LSU	MSU	MIZ	OKL	OMS	SCA	TEN	TEX	TAM	VAN	Team	SR	SW

Updated for entire regular season. Texas at Texas A&M, one game cancelled.
Tie breakers: Alabama over Florida (using head-to-head result), Auburn over Arkansas (using head-to-head result), Ole Miss over Tennessee (using head-to-head result), Oklahoma over Vanderbilt (using head-to-head result).

== Rankings ==
Ranking movements Legend: ██ Increase in ranking ██ Decrease in ranking — = Not ranked RV = Received votes т = Tied with team above or below ( ) = First-place votes
	Week																	
Poll	Pre	1	2	3	4	5	6	7	8	9	10	11	12	13	14	15	16	Final
Coaches'	RV	RV*	14	14	11	8	9	15	18	14	13	14т	21	RV	RV	RV	RV*	1 (30)
Baseball America	19	15	10	10	7	7	7	12	13	11	9	12	16	20	—	—*	—*	1
NCBWA†	RV	19	13	14	11	8	10	16	19	14	12	15	20	RV	RV	RV*	14	1
D1Baseball	—	21	13	12	9	8	8	11	16	14	11	15	24	—	—	—	—*	1
Perfect Game	—	22	12	13	9	8	11	21	—	—	—	—	—	—	—	—*	—*	1

† NCBWA ranks 30 teams in their preseason poll, but only ranks 25 teams weekly during the season.
* A new poll was not released for this week, so for comparison purposes, the previous week's ranking is inserted in this week's slot.
