= 2026 NCAA Division I baseball tournament =

American college sports championship

- Season: 2026
- Teams: 64
- Finals site: Charles Schwab Field Omaha; Omaha, Nebraska
- Champions: Oklahoma (3rd title)
- Runner-up: North Carolina (13th CWS Appearance)
- Winning coach: Skip Johnson (1st title)
- MOP: Jaxon Willits (Oklahoma)
- Attendance: 360,939
- Television: ABC; ESPN; ESPN2; ESPNU; ACCN; SECN; ESPN+

The 2026 NCAA Division I baseball tournament was the 79th edition of the NCAA Division I Baseball Championship. The 64-team tournament began on May 29, as part of the 2026 NCAA Division I baseball season and ended with the 2026 Men's College World Series in Omaha, Nebraska, which was played from June 12 and ended on June 22.

The 64 participating NCAA Division I college baseball teams were selected from an eligible 300 teams. Teams were divided into 16 regionals of four teams, each of which were conducted via a double-elimination bracket. Regional champions advanced to eight Super Regionals, each of which was contested in a best-of-three-game series to determine the eight participants in the Men's College World Series. In the MCWS, two sets of four teams competed in double-elimination brackets, with the two bracket winners facing each other in a best-of-three-game series.

Reigning national champion LSU was not selected for the tournament for the first time since 2011. The Tigers, who won their eighth national championship in 2025, finished 30-28 overall and 9-21 in the Southeastern Conference, placing 14th out of 16 teams. LSU was one of four teams which played in the 2025 MCWS to not qualify for this year's tournament; the others were Arizona, Louisville and Murray State. The other four participants (Arkansas, Coastal Carolina, Oregon State, and national top-seed UCLA) did not advance out of the regional round. This marked the second consecutive year of no teams returning to the Men's College World Series in consecutive years, after there had been at least one returnee each year from 1957 through 2024. It was also the first time in the Super Regional era (since 1999) that none of the prior year's MCWS participants advanced to the subsequent year's Super Regional round.

For the second consecutive year and just third time in the 64-team era (since 1999), the top two national seeds, UCLA and Georgia Tech, were eliminated in their home regional in 2026; joining 2014 (Oregon State and Florida) and 2025 (Vanderbilt and Texas).

== Tournament procedure ==
Sixty-four teams entered the tournament, with 29 of them receiving an automatic bid by either winning their conference's tournament or by finishing in first place in their conference. The remaining 35 bids are at-large, with selections extended by the NCAA Selection Committee.

== National seeds ==
The sixteen national seeds were announced on the Selection Show on May 25. Teams in italics advanced to the Super Regionals. Teams in bold advanced to the 2026 Men's College World Series.

1. UCLA
2. Georgia Tech
3. **Georgia**
4. Auburn
5. **North Carolina**
6. **Texas**
7. **Alabama**
8. Florida
9. Southern Miss
10. Florida State
11. Oregon
12. Texas A&M
13. Nebraska
14. Mississippi State
15. Kansas
16. **West Virginia**

== Schedule and venues ==
On May 24, the NCAA Division I Baseball Committee announced the sixteen regional host sites.

Regionals

- May 29–June 1
  - Foley Field, Athens, Georgia (Host: Georgia)
  - Russ Chandler Stadium, Atlanta, Georgia (Host: Georgia Tech)
  - Plainsman Park, Auburn, Alabama (Host: Auburn)
  - UFCU Disch–Falk Field, Austin, Texas (Host: Texas)
  - Boshamer Stadium, Chapel Hill, North Carolina (Host: North Carolina)
  - Olsen Field at Blue Bell Park, College Station, Texas (Host: Texas A&M)
  - PK Park, Eugene, Oregon (Host: Oregon)
  - Condron Ballpark, Gainesville, Florida (Host: Florida)
  - Pete Taylor Park, Hattiesburg, Mississippi (Host: Southern Mississippi)
  - Hoglund Ballpark, Lawrence, Kansas (Host: Kansas)
  - Haymarket Park, Lincoln, Nebraska (Host: Nebraska)
  - Jackie Robinson Stadium, Los Angeles, California (Host: UCLA)
  - Kendrick Family Ballpark, Granville, West Virginia (Host: West Virginia)
  - Dudy Noble Field, Mississippi State, Mississippi (Host: Mississippi State)
  - Mike Martin Field at Dick Howser Stadium, Tallahassee, Florida (Host: Florida State)
  - Sewell–Thomas Stadium, Tuscaloosa, Alabama (Host: Alabama)

Super Regionals

- June 5–8
  - Foley Field, Athens, Georgia (Host: Georgia)
  - Hoglund Ballpark, Lawrence, Kansas (Host: Kansas)
  - Plainsman Park, Auburn, Alabama (Host: Auburn)
  - UFCU Disch–Falk Field, Austin, Texas (Host: Texas)
  - Boshamer Stadium, Chapel Hill, North Carolina (Host: North Carolina)
  - Riddle–Pace Field, Troy, Alabama (Host: Troy)
  - Sewell–Thomas Stadium, Tuscaloosa, Alabama (Host: Alabama)
  - Kendrick Family Ballpark, Granville, West Virginia (Host: West Virginia)

Men's College World Series

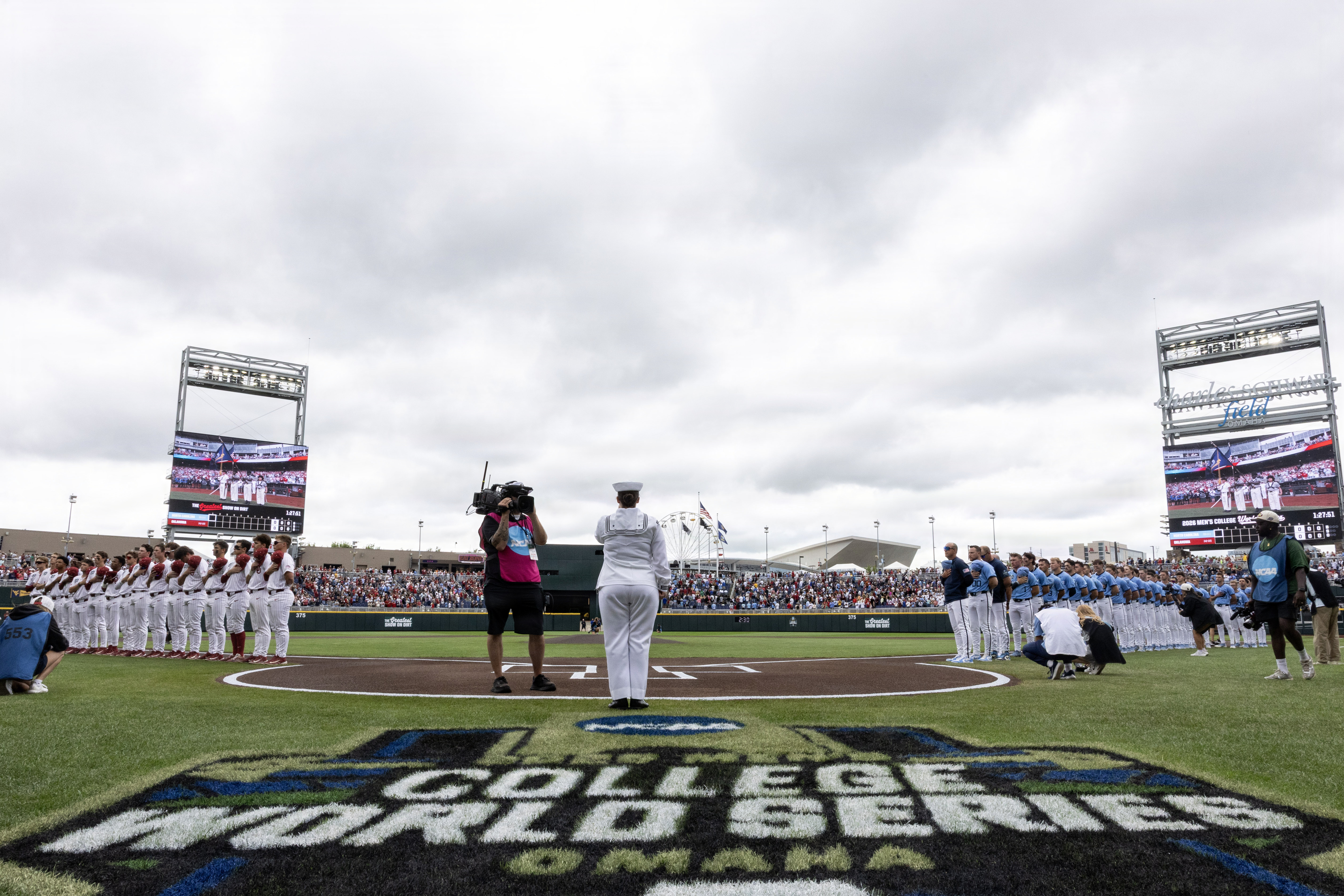
The teams line up on the field prior to the second game of the finals on June 21, 2026.

- June 12–22
  - Charles Schwab Field Omaha, Omaha, Nebraska (Host: Creighton University)

== Bids ==
=== Automatic bids ===
School	Conference	Record (Conf)	Berth	Last NCAA Appearance
Binghamton	America East	31–20 (18–7)	Tournament	2025 Athens Regional
East Carolina	American	36–22–1 (17–10)	Tournament	2025 Conway Regional
Lipscomb	ASUN	29–24 (19–11)	Tournament	2023 Clemson Regional
Georgia Tech	ACC	48–9 (25–5)	Tournament	2025 Oxford Regional
VCU	Atlantic 10	37–23 (20–10)	Tournament	2024 Greenville Regional
Kansas	Big 12	42–16 (22–8)	Tournament	2025 Fayetteville Regional
St. John's	Big East	33–24 (16–4)	Tournament	2024 Charlottesville Regional
USC Upstate	Big South	33–28 (13–11)	Tournament	2025 Clemson Regional
UCLA	Big Ten	51–6 (28–2)	Tournament	2025 Men's College World Series
Cal Poly	Big West	36–22 (22–8)	Tournament	2025 Eugene Regional
Northeastern	CAA	38–20 (22–8)	Tournament	2025 Tallahassee Regional
Jacksonville State	CUSA	46–13 (23–7)	Tournament	2019 Oxford Regional
Milwaukee	Horizon	25–31 (14–10)	Tournament	2010 Tempe Regional
Yale	Ivy League	30–13–1 (14–6–1)	Tournament	2017 Corvallis Regional
Rider	MAAC	33–18 (22–8)	Tournament	2023 Conway Regional
Northern Illinois	MAC	35–17 (21–12)	Tournament	1972 Bowling Green District
UIC	Missouri Valley	27–27–1 (16–8)	Tournament	2024 Louisville Regional
Washington State	Mountain West	30–26 (15–9)	Tournament	2010 Fayetteville Regional
Long Island	Northeast	30–20 (26–7)	Tournament	2024 Chapel Hill Regional
Little Rock	Ohio Valley	36–26 (16–11)	Tournament	2025 Baton Rouge Regional
Holy Cross	Patriot	25–28 (13–13)	Tournament	2025 Chapel Hill Regional
Georgia	SEC	46–12 (23–7)	Tournament	2025 Athens Regional
The Citadel	SoCon	35–24 (11–10)	Tournament	2010 Columbia Regional
Lamar	Southland	34–25 (19–11)	Tournament	2010 Fort Worth Regional
Alabama State	SWAC	34–21 (20–10)	Tournament	2022 Knoxville Regional
South Dakota State	Summit	24–31 (12–15)	Tournament	2013 Eugene Regional
Southern Miss	Sun Belt	44–15 (22–8)	Tournament	2025 Hattiesburg Regional
Saint Mary's	West Coast	34–25 (15–12)	Tournament	2025 Corvallis Regional
Tarleton State	WAC	37–19 (12–6)	Tournament	First appearance

=== At-large ===
Team	Conference	Record (Conf)	Last NCAA Appearance
Alabama	SEC	37–19 (18–12)	2025 Hattiesburg Regional
Arizona State	Big 12	37–19 (19–11)	2025 Los Angeles Regional
Arkansas	SEC	39–20 (17–13)	2025 Men's College World Series
Auburn	SEC	38–19 (17–13)	2025 Auburn Super Regional
Boston College	ACC	36–21 (17–13)	2023 Tuscaloosa Regional
Cincinnati	Big 12	37–20 (17–13)	2025 Fayetteville Regional
Coastal Carolina	Sun Belt	37–21 (21–9)	2025 Men's College World Series
Florida	SEC	39–19 (18–12)	2025 Conway Regional
Florida State	ACC	38–17 (19–11)	2025 Corvallis Super Regional
Kentucky	SEC	31–21 (13–17)	2025 Clemson Regional
Liberty	CUSA	41–19 (21–9)	2022 Gainesville Regional
Louisiana	Sun Belt	39–23 (16–14)	2024 Bryan-College Station Regional
Miami	ACC	38–18 (16–14)	2025 Louisville Super Regional
Mississippi State	SEC	40–17 (16–14)	2025 Tallahassee Regional
Missouri State	CUSA	34–19 (20–10)	2022 Stillwater Regional
NC State	ACC	32–22 (14–16)	2025 Auburn Regional
Nebraska	Big 10	42–15 (23–7)	2025 Chapel Hill Regional
North Carolina	ACC	45–11–1 (22–8)	2025 Chapel Hill Super Regional
Oklahoma	SEC	32–21 (14–16)	2025 Chapel Hill Regional
Oklahoma State	Big 12	37–20 (18–12)	2025 Athens Regional
Ole Miss	SEC	36–21 (15–15)	2025 Oxford Regional
Oregon	Big 10	40–16 (20–10)	2025 Eugene Regional
Oregon State	Independent	43–12	2025 Men's College World Series
Tennessee	SEC	38–20 (15–15)	2025 Fayetteville Super Regional
Texas	SEC	40–13 (19–10)	2025 Austin Regional
Texas A&M	SEC	39–14 (18–11)	2024 Men's College World Series
Texas State	Sun Belt	36–24 (16–14)	2022 Stanford Regional
Troy	Sun Belt	32–29 (17–13)	2023 Tuscaloosa Regional
UCF	Big 12	31–21 (19–11)	2024 Tallahassee Regional
UC Santa Barbara	Big West	38–18 (22–8)	2024 Santa Barbara Regional
USC	Big 10	43–15 (20–10)	2025 Corvallis Regional
Virginia	ACC	36–21 (14–16)	2024 Men's College World Series
Virginia Tech	ACC	30–24 (15–15)	2022 Blacksburg Super Regional
Wake Forest	ACC	38–19 (16–14)	2025 Knoxville Regional
West Virginia	Big 12	39–14 (21–9)	2025 Baton Rouge Super Regional

=== By conference ===
Conference	Total	Schools
SEC	12	Alabama, Arkansas, Auburn, Florida, Georgia, Kentucky, Mississippi State, Oklahoma, Ole Miss, Tennessee, Texas, Texas A&M
ACC	9	Boston College, Florida State, Georgia Tech, Miami, NC State, North Carolina, Virginia, Virginia Tech, Wake Forest
Big 12	6	Arizona State, Cincinnati, Kansas, Oklahoma State, UCF, West Virginia
Sun Belt	5	Coastal Carolina, Louisiana, Southern Miss, Texas State, Troy
Big Ten	4	Nebraska, Oregon, UCLA, USC
CUSA	3	Jacksonville State, Liberty, Missouri State
Big West	2	Cal Poly, UC Santa Barbara
American	1	East Carolina
America East	1	Binghamton
ASUN	1	Lipscomb
Atlantic 10	1	VCU
Big East	1	St. John's
Big South	1	USC Upstate
Coastal	1	Northeastern
Horizon	1	Milwaukee
Independent	1	Oregon State
Ivy League	1	Yale
Metro Atlantic	1	Rider
Mid-American	1	Northern Illinois
Missouri Valley	1	UIC
Mountain West	1	Washington State
Northeast	1	Long Island
Ohio Valley	1	Little Rock
Patriot	1	Holy Cross
Southern	1	The Citadel
Southland	1	Lamar
SWAC	1	Alabama State
Summit	1	South Dakota State
WAC	1	Tarleton State
WCC	1	Saint Mary's

== Regionals and Super Regionals ==
Bold indicates winner. Seeds for regional tournaments indicate seeds within regional. Seeds for super regional tournaments indicate national seeds only. All times Eastern.

=== Morgantown Super Regional ===
Hosted by West Virginia at Kendrick Family Ballpark.

Regional	Regional
1	UCLA	2
**4**	**Saint Mary's**	**3**
4	Saint Mary's	1
**3**	**Cal Poly**	**14**
**3**	**Cal Poly**	**6**
2	Virginia Tech	2
Los Angeles Regional – Jackie Robinson Stadium
**1**	**UCLA**	**6**
2	Virginia Tech	5
1	UCLA	5
**4**	**Saint Mary's**	**6^{10}**
**1**	**West Virginia**	**10**
4	Binghamton	1
1	West Virginia	9
**3**	**Kentucky**	**11**
**3**	**Kentucky**	**6**
2	Wake Forest	5
Morgantown Regional – Kendrick Family Ballpark (Note: The West Virginia campus is in Morgantown, but WVU's ballpark is off campus and outside the city limits in the town of Granville.)
**2**	**Wake Forest**	**12**
4	Binghamton	3
2	Wake Forest	5
**1**	**West Virginia**	**10**

Regional Final
**3**	**Cal Poly**	**5**	–
4	Saint Mary's	2	–
3	Kentucky	9	5
**1**	**West Virginia**	**11**	**6^{10}**

Super Regional; June 5–7
Cal Poly	2	1	–
**16**	**West Virginia**	**12**	**17**	–

=== Troy Super Regional ===
Hosted by Troy at Riddle–Pace Field.

Regional	Regional
**1**	**Florida**	**8**
4	Rider	7
**1**	**Florida**	**22**
2	Miami (FL)	10
3	Troy	5
**2**	**Miami (FL)**	**10**
Gainesville Regional – Condron Ballpark
4	Rider	7
**3**	**Troy**	**15**
**3**	**Troy**	**9**
2	Miami (FL)	6
1	Southern Miss	4
**4**	**Little Rock**	**7**
**4**	**Little Rock**	**8**
3	Jacksonville State	6
**3**	**Jacksonville State**	**15**
2	Virginia	7
Hattiesburg Regional – Pete Taylor Park
1	Southern Miss	11
**2**	**Virginia**	**15^{11}**
2	Virginia	6
**3**	**Jacksonville State**	**7**

Regional Final
1	Florida	11	2
**3**	**Troy**	**16**	**10**
**4**	**Little Rock**	**6**	–
3	Jacksonville State	3	–

Super Regional; June 5–7
**Troy**	**12**	**7**	–
Little Rock	2	2	–

=== Chapel Hill Super Regional ===
Hosted by North Carolina at Boshamer Stadium

Regional	Regional
**1**	**North Carolina**	**8**
4	VCU	0
**1**	**North Carolina**	**7**
3	East Carolina	5
**3**	**East Carolina**	**7^{14}**
2	Tennessee	3
Chapel Hill Regional – Boshamer Stadium
2	Tennessee	4
**4**	**VCU**	**5**
4	VCU	0
**3**	**East Carolina**	**10**
**1**	**Texas A&M**	**7**
4	Lamar	5
**1**	**Texas A&M**	**17**
3	Texas State	2
**3**	**Texas State**	**5**
2	USC	4
College Station Regional – Olsen Field at Blue Bell Park
4	Lamar	6
**2**	**USC**	**19**
**2**	**USC**	**15**
3	Texas State	4

Regional Final
**1**	**North Carolina**	**9**	–
3	East Carolina	3	–
1	Texas A&M	3	1
**2**	**USC**	**14**	**7**

Super Regional; June 5–7
**5**	**North Carolina**	5	**4**	**4**
USC	**9**	0	3

=== Auburn Super Regional ===
Hosted by Auburn at Plainsman Park.

Regional	Regional
1	Auburn	8
**4**	**Milwaukee**	**13**
**4**	**Milwaukee**	**13**
2	UCF	6
3	NC State	3
**2**	**UCF**	**9**
Auburn Regional – Plainsman Park
**1**	**Auburn**	**17**
3	NC State	13
**1**	**Auburn**	**9**
2	UCF	3
**1**	**Nebraska**	**4**
4	South Dakota State	1
1	Nebraska	3
**2**	**Ole Miss**	**6**
3	Arizona State	6
**2**	**Ole Miss**	**7^{14}**
Lincoln Regional – Haymarket Park
4	South Dakota State	0
**3**	**Arizona State**	**17**
**3**	**Arizona State**	**11**
1	Nebraska	8

Regional Final
4	Milwaukee	1	3
**1**	**Auburn**	**8**	**8**
**2**	**Ole Miss**	**5^{10}**	–
3	Arizona State	4	–

Super Regional; June 5–7
4	Auburn	4	3	–
**Ole Miss**	**6**	**5**	–

=== Lawrence Super Regional ===
Hosted by Kansas at Hoglund Ballpark

Regional First Round	Regional
**1**	**Georgia Tech**	**22**
4	UIC	5
**1**	**Georgia Tech**	**9**
2	Oklahoma	3
3	The Citadel	3
**2**	**Oklahoma**	**8**
Atlanta Regional – Russ Chandler Stadium
4	UIC	8
**3**	**The Citadel**	**9^{10}**
3	The Citadel	5
**2**	**Oklahoma**	**15**
**1**	**Kansas**	**6**
4	Northeastern	3
**1**	**Kansas**	**5**
2	Arkansas	3
3	Missouri State	5
**2**	**Arkansas**	**9**
Lawrence Regional – Hoglund Ballpark
**4**	**Northeastern**	**5**
3	Missouri State	1
4	Northeastern	9
**2**	**Arkansas**	**10**

Regional Final
1	Georgia Tech	8	7
**2**	**Oklahoma**	**15**	**8^{10}**
**1**	**Kansas**	**13**	–
2	Arkansas	10	–

Super Regional; June 6–8
**Oklahoma**	**8**	**13**	–
15	Kansas	1	2	–

=== Tuscaloosa Super Regional ===
Hosted by Alabama at Sewell–Thomas Stadium

Regional	Regional
**1**	**Alabama**	**21**
4	Alabama State	3
**1**	**Alabama**	**7**
3	USC Upstate	5
**3**	**USC Upstate**	**8**
2	Oklahoma State	5
Tuscaloosa Regional – Sewell–Thomas Stadium
**2**	**Oklahoma State**	**8^{11}**
4	Alabama State	7
**2**	**Oklahoma State**	**12**
3	USC Upstate	1
1	Florida State	5
**4**	**St. John's**	**6**
**4**	**St. John's**	**21**
3	Northern Illinois	8
**3**	**Northern Illinois**	**12**
2	Coastal Carolina	10
Tallahassee Regional – Mike Martin Field at Dick Howser Stadium
**1**	**Florida State**	**2**
2	Coastal Carolina	1
**1**	**Florida State**	**7^{10}**
3	Northern Illinois	4

Regional Final
**1**	**Alabama**	**9^{11}**	–
2	Oklahoma State	7	–
**4**	**St. John's**	**5**	–
1	Florida State	4	–

Super Regional; June 6–8
**7**	**Alabama**	**8**	**7**	–
St. John's	0	2	–

=== Austin Super Regional ===
Hosted by Texas at UFCU Disch–Falk Field

Regional	Regional
**1**	**Texas**	**19**
4	Holy Cross	1
**1**	**Texas**	**16**
3	Tarleton State	2
**3**	**Tarleton State**	**11**
2	UC Santa Barbara	5
Austin Regional – UFCU Disch–Falk Field
4	Holy Cross	1
**2**	**UC Santa Barbara**	**15**
**2**	**UC Santa Barbara**	**9**
3	Tarleton State	5
**1**	**Oregon**	**14**
4	Yale	2
**1**	**Oregon**	**4**
3	Washington State	0
**3**	**Washington State**	**3**
2	Oregon State	2
Eugene Regional – PK Park
4	Yale	2
**2**	**Oregon State**	**9**
**2**	**Oregon State**	**10**
3	Washington State	1

Regional Final
**1**	**Texas**	**6**	–
2	UC Santa Barbara	4	–
**1**	**Oregon**	**4**	–
2	Oregon State	1	–

Super Regional; June 6–8
**6**	**Texas**	**11**	**6**	–
11	Oregon	3	5	–

=== Athens Super Regional ===
Hosted by Georgia at Foley Field

Regional	Regional
**1**	**Mississippi State**	**10**
4	Lipscomb	1
**1**	**Mississippi State**	**10**
2	Cincinnati	5
3	Louisiana	2
**2**	**Cincinnati**	**12**
Starkville Regional – Dudy Noble Field (Note: While the regional is billed as "Starkville", virtually all of the Mississippi State campus, including the ballpark, is outside the city limits with a mailing address of Mississippi State.)
4	Lipscomb	4
**3**	**Louisiana**	**10**
**3**	**Louisiana**	**8**
2	Cincinnati	6
**1**	**Georgia**	**18**
4	Long Island	2
**1**	**Georgia**	**6**
3	Liberty	2
**3**	**Liberty**	**4**
2	Boston College	3
Athens Regional – Foley Field
**2**	**Boston College**	**8**
4	Long Island	4
2	Boston College	3
**3**	**Liberty**	**8**

Regional Final
**1**	**Mississippi State**	**19**	–
3	Louisiana	5	–
**1**	**Georgia**	**6**	–
3	Liberty	1	–

Super Regional; June 6–8
14	Mississippi State	12	9	–
**3**	**Georgia**	**13**	**11^{10}**	–

== Men's College World Series ==
The Men's College World Series was held at Charles Schwab Field in Omaha, Nebraska.

=== Participants ===
School	Conference	Record (Conf)	Head Coach	Super Regional	Previous MCWS Appearances	MCWS Best Finish	MCWS W–L Record
West Virginia	Big 12	45–15 (21–9)	Steve Sabins	Morgantown	First appearance		
Troy	Sun Belt	38–30 (17–13)	Skylar Meade	Troy	First appearance		
North Carolina	ACC	50–12–1 (22–8)	Scott Forbes	Chapel Hill	12 (last: 2024)	2nd (2006, 2007)	19–25
Ole Miss	SEC	41–21 (15–15)	Mike Bianco	Auburn	6 (last: 2022)	1st (2022)	10–11
Georgia	SEC	51–12 (23–7)	Wes Johnson	Athens	6 (last: 2008)	1st (1990)	10–11
Texas	SEC	45–13 (19–10)	Jim Schlossnagle	Austin	38 (last: 2022)	1st (1949, 1950, 1975, 1983, 2002, 2005)	88–65
Alabama	SEC	42–19 (18–12)	Rob Vaughn	Tuscaloosa	5 (last: 1999)	2nd (1983, 1997)	11–10
Oklahoma	SEC	38–22 (14–16)	Skip Johnson	Lawrence	11 (last: 2022)	1st (1951, 1994)	16–16

=== Bracket ===
Sources: Seeds listed below indicate national seeds only. All times Central.

First round	Second round
**16**	**West Virginia**	**7**
Troy	5
16	West Virginia	2
**5**	**North Carolina**	**5**
**5**	**North Carolina**	**6**
Ole Miss	2
Bracket 1
**Troy**	**12**
Ole Miss	8
Troy	0
**16**	**West Virginia**	**12**
**Oklahoma**	**9**
7	Alabama	0
**Oklahoma**	**4**
3	Georgia	3
**3**	**Georgia**	**7**
6	Texas	1
Bracket 2
7	Alabama	2
**6**	**Texas**	**14**
6	Texas	0
**3**	**Georgia**	**2**

Semifinals
**5**	**North Carolina**	**12**	–
16	West Virginia	7	–
**Oklahoma**	**11**	–
3	Georgia	4	–

Finals
5	North Carolina	3	**6**	2
**Oklahoma**	**9**	2	**13**

=== Game results ===
==== Bracket 1 ====
June 12, 2026; 1:00 pm CDT (UTC-5); Game 1	Troy	**5–7**	**No. 16 West Virginia**	Charles Schwab Field Omaha; Attendance: 24,154; Umpires: HP: Jason Bradley; 1B: Rick Allen; 2B: Kevin Sweeney; 3B: Billy Van Raaphorst
June 12, 2026; 1:00 pm CDT (UTC-5); Game 1	LP: Zach Crotchfelt (7–3)	Boxscore	WP: Ian Korn (6–1); Sv: Ben McDougal (1)	Charles Schwab Field Omaha; Attendance: 24,154; Umpires: HP: Jason Bradley; 1B: Rick Allen; 2B: Kevin Sweeney; 3B: Billy Van Raaphorst
June 12, 2026; 1:00 pm CDT (UTC-5); Game 1	HR: Janicki (20)	Boxscore	HR: Smith (10)	Charles Schwab Field Omaha; Attendance: 24,154; Umpires: HP: Jason Bradley; 1B: Rick Allen; 2B: Kevin Sweeney; 3B: Billy Van Raaphorst

June 12, 2026; 6:00 pm CDT (UTC-5); Game 2	Ole Miss	**2–6**	**No. 5 North Carolina**	Charles Schwab Field Omaha; Attendance: 24,883; Umpires: HP: Derek Mollica; 1B: Brian Miller; 2B: Mark Wagers; 3B: Brandon Cooper
June 12, 2026; 6:00 pm CDT (UTC-5); Game 2	LP: Hudson Calhoun (5–4)	Boxscore	WP: Caden Glauber (11–0)	Charles Schwab Field Omaha; Attendance: 24,883; Umpires: HP: Derek Mollica; 1B: Brian Miller; 2B: Mark Wagers; 3B: Brandon Cooper
June 12, 2026; 6:00 pm CDT (UTC-5); Game 2		Boxscore	HR: Hull (8), Hynek (10)	Charles Schwab Field Omaha; Attendance: 24,883; Umpires: HP: Derek Mollica; 1B: Brian Miller; 2B: Mark Wagers; 3B: Brandon Cooper

June 14, 2026; 1:00 pm CDT (UTC-5); Game 5	**Troy**	**12–8**	Ole Miss	Charles Schwab Field Omaha; Attendance: 24,013; Umpires: HP: Rick Allen; 1B: Billy Van Raaphorst; 2B: Jason Bradley; 3B: Linus Baker
June 14, 2026; 1:00 pm CDT (UTC-5); Game 5	WP: Noah Thigpen (1–5)	Boxscore	LP: JP Robertson (5–2)	Charles Schwab Field Omaha; Attendance: 24,013; Umpires: HP: Rick Allen; 1B: Billy Van Raaphorst; 2B: Jason Bradley; 3B: Linus Baker
June 14, 2026; 1:00 pm CDT (UTC-5); Game 5	HR: Darnell (5), Janicki (21), Cavill (14)	Boxscore	HR: Randle (4), Reuter (8), Furniss (9)	Charles Schwab Field Omaha; Attendance: 24,013; Umpires: HP: Rick Allen; 1B: Billy Van Raaphorst; 2B: Jason Bradley; 3B: Linus Baker

June 14, 2026; 6:00 pm CDT (UTC-5); Game 6	No. 16 West Virginia	**2–5**	**No. 5 North Carolina**	Charles Schwab Field Omaha; Attendance: 24,414; Umpires: HP: Brian Miller; 1B: Brandon Cooper; 2B: Derek Mollica; 3B: Jake Uhlenhopp
June 14, 2026; 6:00 pm CDT (UTC-5); Game 6	LP: Maxx Yehl (9–3)	Boxscore	WP: Walker McDuffie (9–3); Sv: Caden Glauber (5)	Charles Schwab Field Omaha; Attendance: 24,414; Umpires: HP: Brian Miller; 1B: Brandon Cooper; 2B: Derek Mollica; 3B: Jake Uhlenhopp

June 16, 2026; 1:00 pm CDT (UTC-5); Game 9	Troy	**0–12**	**No. 16 West Virginia**	Charles Schwab Field Omaha; Attendance: 21,814; Umpires: HP: Brandon Cooper; 1B: Jake Uhlenhopp; 2B: Brian Miller; 3B: Derek Mollica
June 16, 2026; 1:00 pm CDT (UTC-5); Game 9	LP: Cooper Ellingworth (2–5)	Boxscore	WP: Dawson Montesa (6–5)	Charles Schwab Field Omaha; Attendance: 21,814; Umpires: HP: Brandon Cooper; 1B: Jake Uhlenhopp; 2B: Brian Miller; 3B: Derek Mollica
June 16, 2026; 1:00 pm CDT (UTC-5); Game 9		Boxscore	HR: Kelly (18)	Charles Schwab Field Omaha; Attendance: 21,814; Umpires: HP: Brandon Cooper; 1B: Jake Uhlenhopp; 2B: Brian Miller; 3B: Derek Mollica

June 17, 2026; 1:00 pm CDT (UTC-5); Game 11	**No. 5 North Carolina**	**12–7**	No. 16 West Virginia	Charles Schwab Field Omaha; Attendance: 23,572; Umpires: HP: Jason Bradley; 1B: Brian Miller; 2B: Kevin Sweeney; 3B: Brandon Cooper
June 17, 2026; 1:00 pm CDT (UTC-5); Game 11	WP: Jackson Rose (5–0)	Boxscore	LP: Chansen Cole (10–2)	Charles Schwab Field Omaha; Attendance: 23,572; Umpires: HP: Jason Bradley; 1B: Brian Miller; 2B: Kevin Sweeney; 3B: Brandon Cooper
June 17, 2026; 1:00 pm CDT (UTC-5); Game 11		Boxscore	HR: Kelly (19)	Charles Schwab Field Omaha; Attendance: 23,572; Umpires: HP: Jason Bradley; 1B: Brian Miller; 2B: Kevin Sweeney; 3B: Brandon Cooper

==== Bracket 2 ====
June 13, 2026; 1:00 pm CDT (UTC-5); Game 3	**Oklahoma**	**9–0**	No. 7 Alabama	Charles Schwab Field Omaha; Attendance: 24,579; Umpires: HP: Linus Baker; 1B: Kevin Sweeney; 2B: Billy Van Raaphorst; 3B: Jason Bradley
June 13, 2026; 1:00 pm CDT (UTC-5); Game 3	WP: Cord Rager (6–3)	Boxscore	LP: Tyler Fay (11–5)	Charles Schwab Field Omaha; Attendance: 24,579; Umpires: HP: Linus Baker; 1B: Kevin Sweeney; 2B: Billy Van Raaphorst; 3B: Jason Bradley
June 13, 2026; 1:00 pm CDT (UTC-5); Game 3	HR: Lachance (16)	Boxscore		Charles Schwab Field Omaha; Attendance: 24,579; Umpires: HP: Linus Baker; 1B: Kevin Sweeney; 2B: Billy Van Raaphorst; 3B: Jason Bradley

June 13, 2026; 6:00 pm CDT (UTC-5); Game 4	No. 6 Texas	**1–7**	**No. 3 Georgia**	Charles Schwab Field Omaha; Attendance: 25,002; Umpires: HP: Jake Uhlenhopp; 1B: Mark Wagers; 2B: Brandon Cooper; 3B: Derek Mollica
June 13, 2026; 6:00 pm CDT (UTC-5); Game 4	LP: Dylan Volantis (10–2)	Boxscore	WP: Joey Volchko (11–2)	Charles Schwab Field Omaha; Attendance: 25,002; Umpires: HP: Jake Uhlenhopp; 1B: Mark Wagers; 2B: Brandon Cooper; 3B: Derek Mollica
June 13, 2026; 6:00 pm CDT (UTC-5); Game 4		Boxscore	HR: Lujo (14)	Charles Schwab Field Omaha; Attendance: 25,002; Umpires: HP: Jake Uhlenhopp; 1B: Mark Wagers; 2B: Brandon Cooper; 3B: Derek Mollica

June 15, 2026; 1:00 pm CDT (UTC-5); Game 7	No. 7 Alabama	**2–14**	**No. 6 Texas**	Charles Schwab Field Omaha; Attendance: 22,687; Umpires: HP: Mark Wagers; 1B: Derek Mollica; 2B: Jake Uhlenhopp; 3B: Brian Miller
June 15, 2026; 1:00 pm CDT (UTC-5); Game 7	LP: Zane Adams (8–5)	Boxscore	WP: Ruger Riojas (6–2)	Charles Schwab Field Omaha; Attendance: 22,687; Umpires: HP: Mark Wagers; 1B: Derek Mollica; 2B: Jake Uhlenhopp; 3B: Brian Miller
June 15, 2026; 1:00 pm CDT (UTC-5); Game 7	HR: Lemm (10)	Boxscore	HR: Pack Jr. (12), Rodriguez (5)	Charles Schwab Field Omaha; Attendance: 22,687; Umpires: HP: Mark Wagers; 1B: Derek Mollica; 2B: Jake Uhlenhopp; 3B: Brian Miller

June 15, 2026; 6:00 pm CDT (UTC-5); Game 8	**Oklahoma**	**4–3**	No. 3 Georgia	Charles Schwab Field Omaha; Attendance: 24,455; Umpires: HP: Kevin Sweeney; 1B: Jason Bradley; 2B: Linus Baker; 3B: Rick Allen
June 15, 2026; 6:00 pm CDT (UTC-5); Game 8	WP: Xander Mercurius(1–2); Sv: Jackson Cleveland (9)	Boxscore	LP: Caden Aoki (9–2)	Charles Schwab Field Omaha; Attendance: 24,455; Umpires: HP: Kevin Sweeney; 1B: Jason Bradley; 2B: Linus Baker; 3B: Rick Allen
June 15, 2026; 6:00 pm CDT (UTC-5); Game 8	HR: Willits (7), Brock (11)	Boxscore	HR: Ishikawa (3), Hudson (22), Jackson (32)	Charles Schwab Field Omaha; Attendance: 24,455; Umpires: HP: Kevin Sweeney; 1B: Jason Bradley; 2B: Linus Baker; 3B: Rick Allen

June 16, 2026; 7:00 pm CDT (UTC-5); Game 10	No. 6 Texas	**0–2**	**No. 3 Georgia**	Charles Schwab Field Omaha; Attendance: 24,324; Umpires: HP: Billy Van Raaphorst; 1B: Linus Baker; 2B: Rick Allen; 3B: Mark Wagers
June 16, 2026; 7:00 pm CDT (UTC-5); Game 10	LP: Luke Harrison (6–4)	Boxscore	WP: Justin Byrd (6–2)	Charles Schwab Field Omaha; Attendance: 24,324; Umpires: HP: Billy Van Raaphorst; 1B: Linus Baker; 2B: Rick Allen; 3B: Mark Wagers

June 17, 2026; 6:00 pm CDT (UTC-5); Game 12	**Oklahoma**	**11–4**	No. 3 Georgia	Charles Schwab Field Omaha; Attendance: 24,446; Umpires: HP: Linus Baker; 1B: Rick Allen; 2B: Derek Mollica; 3B: Billy Van Raaphorst
June 17, 2026; 6:00 pm CDT (UTC-5); Game 12	WP: Nick Wesloski (2–1)	Boxscore	LP: Paul Farley (8–2)	Charles Schwab Field Omaha; Attendance: 24,446; Umpires: HP: Linus Baker; 1B: Rick Allen; 2B: Derek Mollica; 3B: Billy Van Raaphorst
June 17, 2026; 6:00 pm CDT (UTC-5); Game 12	HR: Walk 2(6), Gambill (11), Harris 2(6)	Boxscore	HR: Branch (20)	Charles Schwab Field Omaha; Attendance: 24,446; Umpires: HP: Linus Baker; 1B: Rick Allen; 2B: Derek Mollica; 3B: Billy Van Raaphorst

==== Finals ====
===== Game 1 =====
June 20, 2026, 2:00 p.m. (CDT) at Charles Schwab Field Omaha in Omaha, Nebraska
Team	1	2	3	4	6	7	8	9	R	H	E
**Oklahoma**	2	0	1	4	1	0	0	1	**9**	**14**	**0**
No. 5 North Carolina	3	0	0	0	0	0	0	0	**3**	**7**	**1**
WP: Cord Rager (7−3) LP: Jason DeCaro (11−3); Home runs: OU: LaChance 2(18); UNC: None; Attendance: 24,707; Notes: HP: Derek Mollica; 1B: Jake Uhlenhopp; 2B: Billy Van Raaphorst; 3B: Mark Wagers; LF: Brian Miller; RF: Rick Allen; Boxscore

===== Game 2 =====
June 21, 2026, 1:30 p.m. (CDT) at Charles Schwab Field Omaha in Omaha, Nebraska
Team	1	2	3	4	5	6	7	8	9	R	H	E
**No. 5 North Carolina**	0	0	3	0	1	0	2	0	0	**6**	**8**	**1**
Oklahoma	2	0	0	0	0	0	0	0	0	**2**	**4**	**1**
WP: Caden Glauber (12−0) LP: Xander Mercurius (1−3); Home runs: UNC: Hull (9), Nicholson (17); OU: None; Attendance: 24,621; Notes: HP: Brandon Cooper; 1B: Jason Bradley; 2B: Linus Baker; 3B: Kevin Sweeney; LF: Rick Allen; RF: Mark Wagner; Boxscore

===== Game 3 =====
June 22, 2026, 6:00 p.m. (CDT) at Charles Schwab Field Omaha in Omaha, Nebraska
Team	1	2	3	4	5	6	7	8	9	R	H	E
**Oklahoma**	0	2	1	3	1	2	0	4	0	**13**	**14**	**1**
No. 5 North Carolina	0	0	1	0	0	0	1	0	0	**2**	**10**	**1**
WP: LJ Mercurius (7−7) LP: Jackson Rose (5−1); Home runs: OU: Tockey (9), Branch (4); UNC: None; Attendance: 23,248; Notes: HP: Billy Van Raaphorst; 1B: Brandon Cooper; 2B: Derek Mollica; 3B: Brian Miller; LF: Jake Uhlenhopp; RF: Linus Baker; Boxscore

== All-Tournament Team ==
The following players were members of the Men's College World Series All-Tournament Team.

Position	Player	School
P	Joey Volchko	Georgia
P	Caden Glauber	North Carolina
C	Deiten Lachance	Oklahoma
1B	Erik Paulson	North Carolina
2B	Gavin Gallaher	North Carolina
3B	Tyrus Hall	West Virginia
SS	Jaxon Willits	Oklahoma
OF	Jason Walk	Oklahoma
OF	Dasan Harris	Oklahoma
OF	Owen Hull	North Carolina
DH	Adrian Rodriguez	Texas

== Final standings ==
Seeds listed below indicate national seeds only

Place	School	Record
1st	Oklahoma	11–2
2nd	No. 5 North Carolina	9–3
3rd	No. 3 Georgia	7–2
3rd	No. 16 West Virginia	8–3
5th	No. 6 Texas	6–2
5th	Troy	7–3
7th	No. 7 Alabama	5–2
7th	Ole Miss	5–2
9th	No. 4 Auburn	4–3
9th	Cal Poly	3–2
9th	No. 15 Kansas	3–2
9th	Little Rock	3–2
9th	No. 14 Mississippi State	3–2
9th	No. 11 Oregon	3–2
9th	St. John's	3–2
9th	Southern California	5–3
17th	Arizona State	2–2
17th	Arkansas	2–2
17th	East Carolina	2–2
17th	No. 8 Florida	2–2
17th	No. 10 Florida State	2–2
17th	No. 2 Georgia Tech	2–2
17th	Jacksonville State	2–2
17th	Kentucky	2–2
17th	Liberty	2–2
17th	Louisiana	2–2
17th	Milwaukee	2–2
17th	Oklahoma State	2–2
17th	Oregon State	2–2
17th	Saint Mary's	2–2
17th	UC Santa Barbara	2–2
17th	No. 12 Texas A&M	2–2
33rd	Boston College	1–2
33rd	Cincinnati	1–2
33rd	The Citadel	1–2
33rd	Miami (FL)	1–2
33rd	No. 13 Nebraska	1–2
33rd	Northeastern	1–2
33rd	Northern Illinois	1–2
33rd	Tarleton State	1–2
33rd	Texas State	1–2
33rd	UCF	1–2
33rd	No. 1 UCLA	1–2
33rd	USC Upstate	1–2
33rd	Virginia	1–2
33rd	VCU	1–2
33rd	Wake Forest	1–2
33rd	Washington State	1–2
49th	Alabama State	0–2
49th	Binghamton	0–2
49th	Coastal Carolina	0–2
49th	Holy Cross	0–2
49th	UIC	0–2
49th	Lamar	0–2
49th	Lipscomb	0–2
49th	Long Island	0–2
49th	Missouri State	0–2
49th	NC State	0–2
49th	Rider	0–2
49th	South Dakota State	0–2
49th	No. 9 Southern Miss	0–2
49th	Tennessee	0–2
49th	Virginia Tech	0–2
49th	Yale	0–2

== Record by conference ==
Conference	# of Bids	Record	Win %	Nc Record	Nc Win %	RF	SR	WS	NS	CS	NC
SEC	12	49–25	.662	39–15	.772	11	7	5	2	1	1
ACC	9	16–18	.470	16–18	.470	3	1	1	1	1	–
Big 12	6	17–13	.566	17–13	.566	4	2	1	1	–	–
Sun Belt	5	10–11	.476	10–11	.476	2	1	1	–	–	–
Big Ten	4	10–9	.526	10–9	.526	2	2	–	–	–	–
Big East	1	3–2	.600	3–2	.600	1	1	–	–	–	–
Ohio Valley	1	3–2	.600	3–2	.600	1	1	–	–	–	–
Big West	2	5–4	.555	5–4	.555	2	1	–	–	–	–
CUSA	4	4–6	.400	4–6	.400	2	–	–	–	–	–
American	1	2–2	.500	2–2	.500	1	–	–	–	–	–
Horizon	1	2–2	.500	2–2	.500	1	–	–	–	–	–
Independent	1	2–2	.500	2–2	.500	1	–	–	–	–	–
West Coast	1	2–2	.500	2–2	.500	1	–	–	–	–	–
Atlantic 10	1	1–2	.333	1–2	.333	–	–	–	–	–	–
Big South	1	1–2	.333	1–2	.333	–	–	–	–	–	–
CAA	1	1–2	.333	1–2	.333	–	–	–	–	–	–
MAC	1	1–2	.333	1–2	.333	–	–	–	–	–	–
Mountain West	1	1–2	.333	1–2	.333	–	–	–	–	–	–
SoCon	1	1–2	.333	1–2	.333	–	–	–	–	–	–
WAC	1	1–2	.333	1–2	.333	–	–	–	–	–	–
America East	1	0–2	.000	0–2	.000	–	–	–	–	–	–
ASUN	1	0–2	.000	0–2	.000	–	–	–	–	–	–
Ivy League	1	0–2	.000	0–2	.000	–	–	–	–	–	–
Missouri Valley	1	0–2	.000	0–2	.000	–	–	–	–	–	–
MAAC	1	0–2	.000	0–2	.000	–	–	–	–	–	–
Northeast	1	0–2	.000	0–2	.000	–	–	–	–	–	–
Patriot	1	0–2	.000	0–2	.000	–	–	–	–	–	–
Southland	1	0–2	.000	0–2	.000	–	–	–	–	–	–
Summit	1	0–2	.000	0–2	.000	–	–	–	–	–	–
SWAC	1	0–2	.000	0–2	.000	–	–	–	–	–	–

== Media coverage ==
=== Radio ===
NRG Media provided nationwide radio coverage of the Men's College World Series through its Omaha Station KOZN, in association with Westwood One. It also streamed all MCWS games at westwoodonesports.com, Tunein, the Varsity Network, and on SiriusXM.

==== Broadcast assignments ====
Broadcasters include John Bishop (play-by-play Games 1–14, reporter for the Championship Series), Connor Happer (analyst Games 1-4 & 11-14, reporter Games 5-10), Mike Ferrin (analyst Games 5-10), Josh Peterson (reporter Games 1-4 & 11-14), Kevin Kugler (play-by-play championship series), and Scott Graham (analyst championship series).

=== Television ===
ESPN networks aired every game from the Regionals, Super Regionals, and the Men's College World Series.

==== Broadcast assignments ====
Regionals

- Dave Neal and Gordon Beckham: Athens, Georgia
- Mike Ferrin and Gaby Sánchez: Atlanta, Georgia
- Mark Neely and Gregg Olson: Auburn, Alabama
- Roy Philpott and Keith Moreland: Austin, Texas
- Mike Monaco and Ben McDonald: Chapel Hill, North Carolina
- Richard Cross and Todd Walker: College Station, Texas
- Clay Matvick and David Aardsma: Eugene, Oregon
- Eric Frede and Lance Cormier: Gainesville, Florida
- Kevin Fitzgerald and Bobby Moranda: Hattiesburg, Mississippi
- Victor Rojas and Connor Wanhanen: Lawrence, Kansas
- Karl Ravech and Kyle Peterson: Lincoln, Nebraska
- Roxy Bernstein and Wes Clements: Los Angeles, California
- Tom Hart and Jensen Lewis: Morgantown, West Virginia
- Jack Kizer and Jack DeLongchamps: Starkville, Mississippi
- Daron Vaught and Devon Travis: Tallahassee, Florida
- Derek Jones and Jared Mitchell: Tuscaloosa, Alabama

Super Regionals

- Mike Monaco, Ben McDonald, and Eduardo Pérez: Athens, Georgia
- Tom Hart and Todd Walker: Auburn, Alabama
- Karl Ravech, Kyle Peterson, and Chris Burke: Austin, Texas
- Mike Ferrin and Gaby Sánchez: Chapel Hill, North Carolina
- Victor Rojas and Gregg Olson: Lawrence, Kansas
- Roxy Bernstein and Jensen Lewis: Morgantown, West Virginia
- Clay Matvick and Lance Cormier: Troy, Alabama
- Dave Neal and Devon Travis: Tuscaloosa, Alabama

Men's College World Series

- Mike Monaco, Eduardo Perez, Ben McDonald and Taylor McGregor: June 12 & 13 afternoons
- Karl Ravech, Chris Burke, Kyle Peterson, and Kris Budden: June 12–14 evenings
- Mike Monaco, Eduardo Perez, Ben McDonald and Taylor McGregor: June 14 afternoon
- Mike Monaco, Eduardo Perez, Ben McDonald and Taylor McGregor: June 15 & 16 afternoons
- Karl Ravech, Chris Burke, Kyle Peterson, and Kris Budden: June 15 & 16 evenings
- Mike Monaco, Eduardo Perez, Ben McDonald and Taylor McGregor: June 17 afternoon
- Karl Ravech, Chris Burke, Kyle Peterson, and Kris Budden: June 17 evening

MCWS Championship Series

- Karl Ravech, Chris Burke, Kyle Peterson, and Kris Budden

== See also ==
- 2026 NCAA Division I softball tournament
- 2026 NAIA baseball tournament
