= Skip Johnson =

American baseball player and coach (born 1967)

Current position
- Title: Head coach
- Team: Oklahoma
- Conference: SEC
- Record: 310–198 (.610)

Biographical details
- Born: February 17, 1967 (age 59); Denton, Texas, U.S.

Playing career
- 1986–1987: Ranger College
- 1988: North Texas
- 1989: Texas–Pan American

Coaching career (HC unless noted)
- 1994–2006: Navarro College
- 2007–2016: Texas (assistant)
- 2017: Oklahoma (assistant)
- 2018–present: Oklahoma

Head coaching record
- Overall: 310–198 (.610)
- Tournaments: NCAA: 24–13

Accomplishments and honors

Championships
- NCAA champion (2026); Big 12 Tournament (2022); Big 12 regular season (2024)

Awards
- Big 12 Coach of the Year (2024)

Arthur Ray "Skip" Johnson (born February 17, 1967) is an American college baseball coach and former player. He is head baseball coach at the University of Oklahoma. He played college baseball at Ranger College from 1986 to 1987, the University of North Texas in 1988 and the University of Texas–Pan American in 1989. He served as the head coach of Navarro College from 1994 to 2006.

== Head coaching record ==
Record table
Season	Team	Overall	Conference	Standing	Postseason
Oklahoma Sooners (Big 12 Conference) (2018–2024)
2018	Oklahoma	38–25	14–10	4th	NCAA regional
2019	Oklahoma	33–23	11–13	T–6th	Big 12 Tournament
2020	Oklahoma	14–4	0–0		Season canceled due to COVID-19
2021	Oklahoma	27–28	11–13	5th	Big 12 Tournament
2022	Oklahoma	45–24	15–9	T–2nd	College World Series runner-up
2023	Oklahoma	32–28	11–13	7th	NCAA regional
2024	Oklahoma	40–21	23–7	1st	NCAA regional
Oklahoma Sooners (Southeastern Conference) (2025–present)
2025	Oklahoma	38–22	14–16	12th	NCAA regional
2026	Oklahoma	43–23	14–16	T–11th	College World Series Champions
Oklahoma:		310–198 (.610)	99–81 (.550)		
Total:		310–198 (.610)			
National champion Postseason invitational champion Conference regular season champion Conference regular season and conference tournament champion Division regular season champion Division regular season and conference tournament champion Conference tournament champion

== See also ==
- List of current NCAA Division I baseball coaches
