= Jaxon Willits =

American baseball player (born 2004)

Los Angeles Angels
- Shortstop
- Born: October 27, 2004 (age 21); Chickasha, Oklahoma, U.S.
- Bats: Switch Throws: Right
- Stats at Baseball Reference

Career highlights and awards
- College World Series Most Outstanding Player (2026); College World Series champion (2026)

Jaxon Drew Willits (born October 27, 2004) is an American professional baseball shortstop in the Los Angeles Angels organization.

== Amateur career ==
=== High school career ===
Willits attended Fort Cobb-Broxton High School in Fort Cobb, Oklahoma. In 2021, he hit .541 with five home runs, 24 RBI and 32 stolen bases. In 2022, he hit .645 with eight home runs, 40 RBI, 38 stolen bases and a 2.102 OPS. In his 2023 season as a senior, he hit .620 with eight home runs and 42 stolen bases to be named to the 2023 Oklahoma All-State Baseball Player of the Year.

Following his high school career, Willits committed to play college baseball at the University of Oklahoma.

=== College career ===
As a freshman in his 2024 season, he slashed .268/.376/.484 with 10 home runs and 39 RBI in 57 games. He was named to the All-Big 12 Freshman Team. Following the season, he played for Falmouth Commodores in Cape Cod Baseball League, batting .297 with a.781 OPS.

As a sophomore in his 2025 season, he slashed .302/.409/.495 with nine home runs in 60 games. Following the season, he played for Hyannis Harbor Hawks in CCBL, slashing .366/.534/.488 in 13 games.

During the 2026 Men's College World Series, Willits batted .500 with one home run, four doubles, and seven RBI, helping lead the Sooners to their first national championship since 1994. He was subsequently named the College World Series Most Outstanding Player. As a junior, he slashed .313/.407/.515 with seven home runs, 55 RBI and six stolen bases in 64 games. Also he led the team with 20 doubles.

Across the three seasons at Sooners, Willits started 160 games and recorded 26 home runs, 142 RBI and 109 walks.

== Professional career ==
Willits was selected by the Los Angeles Angels in the fifth round, with the 141st overall pick, of the 2026 Major League Baseball draft. He signed with the Angels for $647,500 on July 22, 2026.

== Personal life ==
Willits is the son of former Major League Baseball (MLB) player Reggie Willits. His brother, Eli, was selected first overall in the 2025 MLB draft by the Washington Nationals. He also has a younger brother named Hunter.
