= 2026 USC Trojans baseball team =

2026 season of the University of Southern California baseball team

2026 USC Trojans baseball

College Station Regional Champions

Chapel Hill Super Regional, 1–2
- Conference: Big Ten Conference

Ranking
- Coaches: No. 15
- D1Baseball.com: No. 15
- Record: 48–18 (20–10 Big Ten)
- Head coach: Andy Stankiewicz (4th season)
- Assistant coaches: Sean Allen (2nd season); Travis Jewett (4th season)
- Home stadium: Dedeaux Field (Capacity: 2,500)

2026 Big Ten Conference baseball standings
| | Conf. | | | | | | Overall |
| Team | W | | L | | T | PCT | W | | L | | T | PCT |
|---|---|---|---|---|---|---|---|---|---|---|---|---|
| No. 11 UCLA ‍†‍‡‍^{y} | 28 | – | 2 | – | 0 | .933 | 48 | – | 6 | – | 0 | .889 |
| Nebraska ‍‍‍^{y} | 23 | – | 7 | – | 0 | .767 | 41 | – | 14 | – | 0 | .745 |
| No. 13 Oregon ‍‍‍^{y} | 20 | – | 10 | – | 0 | .667 | 38 | – | 15 | – | 0 | .717 |
| No. 15 USC ‍‍‍^{y} | 20 | – | 10 | – | 0 | .667 | 42 | – | 14 | – | 0 | .750 |
| Purdue ‍‍‍ | 18 | – | 13 | – | 0 | .581 | 36 | – | 18 | – | 0 | .667 |
| Ohio State ‍‍‍ | 18 | – | 12 | – | 0 | .600 | 29 | – | 24 | – | 0 | .547 |
| Michigan ‍‍‍ | 17 | – | 13 | – | 0 | .567 | 33 | – | 22 | – | 0 | .600 |
| Iowa ‍‍‍ | 15 | – | 15 | – | 0 | .500 | 30 | – | 21 | – | 0 | .588 |
| Illinois ‍‍‍ | 14 | – | 16 | – | 0 | .467 | 27 | – | 27 | – | 0 | .500 |
| Rutgers ‍‍‍ | 13 | – | 17 | – | 0 | .433 | 26 | – | 29 | – | 0 | .473 |
| Washington ‍‍‍ | 12 | – | 18 | – | 0 | .400 | 23 | – | 31 | – | 0 | .426 |
| Michigan State ‍‍‍ | 12 | – | 19 | – | 0 | .387 | 22 | – | 31 | – | 0 | .415 |
| Minnesota ‍‍‍ | 11 | – | 19 | – | 0 | .367 | 30 | – | 23 | – | 0 | .566 |
| Maryland ‍‍‍ | 9 | – | 21 | – | 0 | .300 | 27 | – | 29 | – | 0 | .482 |
| Indiana ‍‍‍ | 9 | – | 21 | – | 0 | .300 | 23 | – | 31 | – | 0 | .426 |
| Penn State ‍‍‍ | 9 | – | 21 | – | 0 | .300 | 16 | – | 35 | – | 0 | .314 |
| Northwestern ‍‍‍ | 8 | – | 22 | – | 0 | .267 | 21 | – | 30 | – | 1 | .413 |
† – Conference champion ‡ – Tournament champion y – Invited to the NCAA tournament As of May 19, 2026; Rankings from D1Baseball

The 2026 USC Trojans baseball team will represent the University of Southern California (USC) during the 2026 NCAA Division I baseball season. The Trojans will play their home games for the 50th season at Dedeaux Field and for the first time since 2023. The team will be coached by Andy Stankiewicz in his 4th season at USC.

== Previous season ==
The Trojans ended the 2025 season with a record of 18–12 in conference play and 37–23 overall record, good for 4th place in the Big Ten. They would play in the Big Ten tournament as the #4 seed, they would lose to Penn State in Game 1, but would beat Washington in Game 2. They would receive an at-large bid to the NCAA tournament as a 3rd seed where they would beat No. 24 TCU and Saint Mary's (CA), but would lose to No. 4 Oregon State 14–1 in Game 1 and 9–0 in Game 2.

== Roster ==
2026 USC Trojans roster
| Pitchers | Catchers Infielders | Outfielders | Two Way Players |

=== Coaches ===
2026 USC Trojans baseball coaching staff
- Andy Stankiewicz – Head coach – 4th season
- Travis Jewett – Assistant coach – 4th season
- Sean Allen – Assistant coach – 2nd season

Note: Season counter accounts for all stints at USC.

== Personnel ==
=== Starters ===
Opening Night Lineup
| Pos. | No. | Player. | Year |
|---|---|---|---|
| -- | -- | -- | -- |
| -- | -- | -- | -- |
| -- | -- | -- | -- |
| -- | -- | -- | -- |
| -- | -- | -- | -- |
| -- | -- | -- | -- |
| -- | -- | -- | -- |
| -- | -- | -- | -- |
| -- | -- | -- | -- |

Weekend pitching rotation
| Day | No. | Player. | Year |
|---|---|---|---|
| Friday | -- | -- | -- |
| Saturday | -- | -- | -- |
| Sunday | -- | -- | -- |

== Schedule and results ==
2026 USC Trojans baseball game log (Overall: 48–18; Conference: 20–10); (Home: 32–1; Away: 13–15; Neutral: 3–2)
Regular season (42–14)
February (10–0)
(Home; 7–0; Away: 3–0)

| Date | Time (PST) | Opponent | Rank | TV | Venue | Score | Win | Loss | Save | Attendance | Overall record | B1G record |
|---|---|---|---|---|---|---|---|---|---|---|---|---|
| February 13 | 6:00 p.m. | vs Pepperdine* | | BTN+ | Dedeaux Field • Los Angeles, California | **W 3-1** | Mason Edwards (1-0) | Tommy Scavone (0-1) | **Troy Adam (1)** | 1,598 | 1-0 | — |
| February 14 | 6:00 p.m. | vs Pepperdine* | | BTN+ | Dedeaux Field • Los Angeles, California | **W 11-0**(7) | Grant Govel (1-0) | Collin Valentine (0-1) | None | 1,087 | 2-0 | — |
| February 15 | 12:00 p.m. | vs Pepperdine* | | BTN+ | Dedeaux Field • Los Angeles, California | **W 8-5** | Andrew Johnson (1-0) | Dylan Stewart (0-1) | **Troy Adam (2)** | 1,324 | 3-0 | — |
| February 17 | 6:00 p.m. | vs Loyola Marymount* | | BTN+ | Dedeaux Field • Los Angeles, California | **W 14-4**(7) | Cameron Fausset (1-0) | Jacob Fried (0-1) | None | 414 | 4-0 | — |
| February 20 | 6:00 p.m. | vs Rice* | | BTN+ | Dedeaux Field • Los Angeles, California | **W 5-0** | Mason Edwards (2-0) | Brayden Sharp (1-1) | **Gavin Lauridsen (1)** | 1,118 | 5-0 | — |
| February 21 | 6:00 p.m. | vs Rice* | | BTN+ | Dedeaux Field • Los Angeles, California | **W 4-1** | Grant Govel (2-0) | Ryland Urbancyzk (0-1) | **Troy Adam (3)** | 1,097 | 6-0 | — |
| February 22 | 12:00 p.m. | vs Rice* | | BTN+ | Dedeaux Field • Los Angeles, California | **W 4-2** | Andrew Johnson (2-0) | Ethan Sanders (0-1) | **Troy Adam (4)** | 1,265 | 7-0 | — |
| February 26 | 6:05 p.m. | at Cal Poly* | | ESPN+ | Robin Baggett Stadium • San Luis Obispo, California | **W 4-1** | Chase Herrell (1-0) | Corden Pettey (1-1) | None | 1,587 | 8-0 | — |
| February 27 | 6:05 p.m. | at Cal Poly* | | ESPN+ | Robin Baggett Stadium • San Luis Obispo, California | **W 6-0**(11) | Sax Matson (1-0) | Sean McGrath (0-1) | None | 2,508 | 9-0 | — |
| February 28 | 3:05 p.m. | at Cal Poly* | | ESPN+ | Robin Baggett Stadium • San Luis Osispo, California | **W 16-2** | Grant Govel (3-0) | Laif Palmer 91-2) | None | 2,612 | 10-0 | — |

March (17–3)
(Home; 12–1; Away: 5–2)

| Date | Time | Opponent | Rank | TV | Venue | Score | Win | Loss | Save | Attendance | Overall record | B1G record |
|---|---|---|---|---|---|---|---|---|---|---|---|---|
| March 1 | 1:05 p.m. | at Cal Poly* | | ESPN+ | Robin Baggett Stadium • San Luis Osispo, California | **W 8-6**(11) | **Gavin Lauridsen (1-0)** | Sean McGrath (0-2) | None | 2,308 | 11-0 | — |
| March 3 | 6:00 p.m. | vs UC Irvine* | | BTN+ | Dedeaux Field • Los Angeles, California | **W 6-4** | **Cameron Fausset (2-0)** | Ryder Brooks (0-1) | **Sax Matson (1)** | 598 | 12-0 | — |
| March 4 | 6:00 p.m. | vs Waseda (Japan)* (Exhibition) | | BTN+ | Dedeaux Field • Los Angeles, California | **T** 2–2 | None | None | None | — | — | — |
| March 6 | 6:00 p.m. | vs Illinois | | BTN+ | Dedeaux Field • Los Angeles, California | **W 4–0** | **Mason Edwards (3–0)** | Ben Plumley (1–2) | None | 1,328 | 13–0 | 1–0 |
| March 7 | 6:00 p.m. | vs Illinois | | BTN+ | Dedeaux Field • Los Angeles, California | **W 4–0** | **Grant Govel (4–0)** | Regan Hall (2–1) | None | 1,119 | 14–0 | 2–0 |
| March 8 | 12:00 p.m. | vs Illinois | | BTN+ | Dedeaux Field • Los Angeles, California | **W 5–3** | **Diego Velazquez (1–0)** | Kyle Remington (2–1) | **Adam Troy (5)** | 1,273 | 15–0 | 3–0 |
| March 10 | 6:00 p.m. | vs Long Beach State* | No. 25 | BTN+ | Dedeaux Field • Los Angeles, California | **W 6–1** | **Chase Herrell (2–0)** | Van Larson (0–2) | None | 1,026 | 16–0 | — |
| March 11 | 6:00 p.m. | vs San Diego* | No. 25 | BTN+ | Dedeaux Field • Los Angeles, California | **W 7–6**(10) | **Adam Troy (1–0)** | Hayden Cody (0–1) | None | 786 | 17–0 | — |
| March 13 | 1:00 p.m. | at Northwestern | No. 25 | BTN+ | Rocky Miller Park • Evanston, Illinois | **W 15–1**(7) | **Mason Edwards (4–0)** | Ryan Weaver (0–2) | None | 140 | 18–0 | 4–0 |
| March 14 (DH 1) | 9:00 a.m. | at Northwestern | No. 25 | BTN+ | Rocky Miller Park • Evanston, Illinois | **W 2–0** | **Govel Grant (5–0)** | Jake Rifenburg (2–1) | **Adam Troy (6)** | 215 | 19–0 | 5–0 |
| March 14 (DH 2) | 12:20 p.m. | at Northwestern | No. 25 | BTN+ | Rocky Miller Park • Evanston, Illinois | **L 1–2** | Sam Hliboki (2–2) | **Adam Troy (1–1)** | None | 230 | 19–1 | 5–1 |
| March 17 | 6:30 p.m. | vs San Diego State* | No. 13 | BTN+ | Dedeaux Field • Los Angeles, California | **W 7–4** | **Diego Velazquez (2–0)** | Aidan Russell (2–1) | **Adam Troy (7)** | 893 | 20–1 | — |
| March 18 | 6:30 p.m. | vs Cal State Bakersfield* | No. 13 | BTN+ | Dedeaux Field • Los Angeles, California | **W 4–3** | **Henry Chabot (1–0)** | Jeter Schuerman (0–1) | None | 867 | 21–1 | — |
| March 20 | 6:30 p.m. | vs Washington | No. 13 | BTN+ | Dedeaux Field • Los Angeles, California | **W 5–0** | **Mason Edwards (5–0)** | Noah Kenney (1–2) | **Gavin Lauridsen (2)** | 1,067 | 22–1 | 6–1 |
| March 21 | 6:30 p.m. | vs Washington | No. 13 | BTN+ | Dedeaux Field • Los Angeles, California | **W 7–2** | **Grant Govel (6–0)** | Jackson Thomas (1–1) | None | 1,208 | 23–1 | 7–1 |
| March 22 | 1:00 p.m. | vs Washington | No. 13 | BTN+ | Dedeaux Field • Los Angeles, California | **W 14–4**(7) | **Henry Chabot (2–0)** | Hayden Lewis (2–3) | None | 1,087 | 24–1 | 8–1 |
| March 24 | 1:00 p.m. | vs No. 16 Oregon State* | No. 12 | BTN+ | Dedeaux Field • Los Angeles, California | **L 4–12** | Connor Mendez (1–1) | **Chase Herrell (2–1)** | None | 985 | 24–2 | — |
| March 27 | 3:00 p.m. | at Maryland | No. 12 | BTN+ | Bob "Turtle" Smith Stadium • College Park, Maryland | **W 11–10** | **Garren Rizzo (1–0)** | Lance Williams (1–3) | **Adam Troy (8)** | 200 | 25–2 | 9–1 |
| March 28 | 11:00 a.m. | at Maryland | No. 12 | BTN+ | Bob "Turtle" Smith Stadium • College Park, Maryland | **L 4–6** | Cristofer Cespedes (3–1) | **Diego Velazquez (2–1)** | Logan Hastings (3) | 500 | 25–3 | 9–2 |
| March 29 | 10:00 a.m. | at Maryland | No. 12 | BTN+ | Bob "Turtle" Smith Stadium • College Park, Maryland | **W 14–4**(8) | **Gavin Lauridsen (2–0)** | Jake Yeager (0–2) | None | 500 | 26–3 | 10–2 |
| March 31 | 7:00 p.m. | vs UC Santa Barbara* | No. 12 | BTN+ | Dedeaux Field • Los Angeles, California | **W 7–6** | **Chase Herrell (3–1)** | Van Froling (1–1) | **Adam Troy (9)** | 907 | 27–3 | — |

April (7–9)
(Home; 7–0; Away: 0–9)

| Date | Time | Opponent | Rank | TV | Venue | Score | Win | Loss | Save | Attendance | Overall record | B1G record |
|---|---|---|---|---|---|---|---|---|---|---|---|---|
| April 3 | 6:00 p.m. | at No. 1 UCLA (Rivalry) | No. 12 | BTN+ | Jackie Robinson Stadium • Los Angeles, California | **L 4–12** | Zach Strickland (3–1) | **Gavin Lauridsen (2–1)** | Easton Hawk (4) | 1,747 | 27–4 | 10–3 |
| April 4 | 2:00 p.m. | at No. 1 UCLA; Rivalry | No. 12 | BTN+ | Jackie Robinson Stadium • Los Angeles, California | **L 8–9** | Cal Randall (2–0) | **Adam Troy (1–2)** | Easton Hawk (5) | 1,672 | 27–5 | 10–4 |
| April 5 | 3:00 p.m. | at No. 1 UCLA; Rivalry | No. 12 | BTN | Jackie Robinson Stadium • Los Angeles, California | **L 4–10** | Chris Grothues (1–0) | **Andrew Johnson (2–1)** | Zach Strickland (1) | 1,569 | 27–6 | 10–5 |
| April 7 | 4:30 p.m. | at UC Santa Barbara* | No. 14 | ESPN+ | Caesar Uyesaka Stadium • Santa Barbara, California | **L 1–5** | AJ Krodel (2–2) | **Chase Harrell** (3–2) | Cole Tryba (1) | 1,000 | 27–7 | — |
| April 10 | 7:00 p.m. | vs Iowa | No. 14 | BTN+ | Dedeaux Field • Los Angeles, California | **W 9–2** | **Mason Edwards (6–0)** | Justin Hackett (0–1) | None | 1,031 | 28–7 | 11–5 |
| April 11 | 2:00 p.m. | vs Iowa | No. 14 | BTN+ | Dedeaux Field • Los Angeles, California | **W 6–3** | **Grant Govel (7–0)** | Maddux Frese (1–2) | **Adam Troy (10)** | 1,144 | 29–7 | 12–5 |
| April 12 | 1:00 p.m. | vs Iowa | No. 14 | BTN+ | Dedeux Field • Los Angeles, California | **W 8–2** | **Andrew Johnson** (3–1) | Logan Runde (2–3) | None | 904 | 30–7 | 13–5 |
| April 14 | 6:00 p.m. | at Long Beach State* | No. 12 | ESPN+ | Blair Field • Long Beach, California | **L 3–5** | Caleb Anderson (2–5) | **Chase Herrell (3–3)** | None | 1,000 | 30–8 | — |
| April 17 | 4:00 p.m. | at Nebraska | No. 12 | BTN+ | Haymarket Park • Lincoln, Nebraska | **L 7–8**(10) | J'Shaun Unger (5–1) | **Sax Matson (1–1)** | None | 6,271 | 30–9 | 13–6 |
| April 18 | 12:00 p.m. | at Nebraska | No. 12 | BTN+ | Haymarket Park • Lincoln, Nebraska | **L 2–12**(7) | Carson Jasa (7–1) | **Grant Govel (7–1)** | None | 7,602 | 30–10 | 13–7 |
| April 19 | 10:00 a.m. | at Nebraska | No. 12 | BTN+ | Haymarket Park • Lincoln, Nebraska | **L 6–16**(8) | Ty Horn (2–1) | **Andrew Johnson (3–2)** | None | 7,510 | 30–11 | 13–8 |
| April 21 | 6:00 p.m. | at Cal State Fullerton* | No. 23 | ESPN+ | Goodwin Field • Fullerton, California | **W 9–2** | **Diego Velazquez (3–1)** | Nick Santivanez (2–1) | None | 1,805 | 31–11 | — |
| April 24 | 7:00 p.m. | vs Purdue | No. 23 | BTN+ | Dedeaux Field • Los Angeles, California | **W 4–3** | **Diego Velazquez (4–1)** | Cole Van Assen (5–3) | **Adam Troy (11)** | 908 | 32–11 | 14–8 |
| April 25 | 2:00 p.m. | vs Purdue | No. 23 | BTN+ | Dedeaux Field • Los Angeles, California | **W 6–1** | **Grant Govel (8–1)** | Zach Erdman (3–1) | None | 811 | 33–11 | 15–8 |
| April 26 | 1:00 p.m. | vs Purdue | No. 23 | BTN+ | Dedeaux Field • Los Angeles, California | **W 11–4** | **Andrew Johnson (4–2)** | Austin Klug (6–2) | None | 1,291 | 34–11 | 16–8 |
| April 28 | 6:00 p.m. | at UC Irvine* | No. 21 | ESPN+ | Anteater Ballpark • Irvine, California | **L 1–4** | David Butler (1–0) | **Chase Herrell (3–4)** | Peyton Rodgers (3) | 1,666 | 34–12 | — |

May (8–2)
(Home: 7–0; Away: 1–2)

| Date | Time | Opponent | Rank | TV | Venue | Score | Win | Loss | Save | Attendance | Overall record | B1G record |
|---|---|---|---|---|---|---|---|---|---|---|---|---|
| May 1 | 7:00 p.m. | vs Rutgers | No. 21 | BTN+ | Dedeaux Field • Los Angeles, California | **W 5–1** | **Mason Edwards (7–0)** | Zack Konstantinovsk (3–5) | None | 804 | 35–12 | 17–8 |
| May 2 | 2:00 p.m. | vs Rutgers | No. 21 | BTN+ | Dedeaux Field • Los Angeles, California | **W 11–1**(7) | **Grant Govel (9–1)** | Vincent Borghese (3–4) | None | 1,234 | 36–12 | 18–8 |
| May 3 | 1:00 p.m. | vs Rutgers | No. 21 | BTN+ | Dedeaux Field • Los Angeles, California | **W 12–2**(8) | **Diego Velazquez** (5–1) | Chris Sand (4–3) | None | 1,091 | 37–12 | 19–8 |
| May 5 | 7:00 p.m. | vs Cal State Fullerton* | No. 18 | BTN+ | Dedeaux Field • Los Angeles, California | **W 13–4** | **Gavin Lauridsen (3–1)** | Nick Santivanez (2–2) | None | 673 | 38–12 | — |
| May 7 | 7:00 p.m. | vs Nevada* | No. 18 | BTN+ | Dedeaux Field • Los Angeles, California | **W 8–0** | **Mason Edwards (8–0)** | Aidan Brainard (5–3) | None | 818 | 39–12 | — |
| May 8 | 7:00 p.m. | vs Nevada* | No. 18 | BTN+ | Dedeaux Field • Los Angeles, California | **W 11–3** | **Grant Govel (10–1)** | Dominic Desch (2–3) | **Gavin Lauridsen (3)** | 906 | 40–12 | — |
| May 9 | 1:00 p.m. | vs Nevada* | No. 18 | BTN+ | Dedeaux Field • Los Angeles, California | **W 12–4** | **Andrew Johnson (5–2)** | Luke Schat (1–2) | None | 891 | 41–12 | — |
| May 14 | 6:00 p.m | at No. 16 Oregon | No. 17 | BTN+ | PK Park • Eugene, Oregon | **W 2–1**(11) | **Andrew Johnson** (6–2) | Tanner Bradley (5–1) | **Adam Troy (12)** | 3,644 | 42–12 | 20–8 |
| May 15 | 6:00 p.m. | at No. 16 Oregon | No. 17 | BTN+ | PK Park • Eugene, Oregon | **L 3–4** | Will Sanford (7–2) | **Grant Govel (10–2)** | Devin Bell (11) | 3,461 | 42–13 | 20–9 |
| May 16 | 3:00 p.m. | at No. 16 Oregon | No. 17 | BTN | PK Park • Eugene, Oregon | **L 5–6**(14) | Collin Clarke (6–3) | **Sax Matson (1–2)** | None | 3,846 | 42–14 | 20–10 |

Postseason (6–4)
Big Ten Tournament (1–1)

| Date | Time | Opponent | Rank | TV | Venue | Score | Win | Loss | Save | Attendance | Overall record | Tournament record |
|---|---|---|---|---|---|---|---|---|---|---|---|---|
| May 22 | 7:00 a.m. | vs (12) Michigan State (Quarterfinals) | (4); No. 25 | BTN | Charles Schwab Field • Omaha, Nebraska | **W 7–0** | – | – | – | – | 43–14 | 1–0 |
| May 23 | 12:00 p.m. | vs (1) No. 1 UCLA; Rivalry (Semifinals) | (4); No. 25 | BTN | Charles Schwab Field • Omaha, Nebraska | **L 5–7** | Easton Hawk (5-2) | **Troy Adam (1-3)** | None | — | 43–15 | 1–1 |

College Station Regional (4–1)

| Date | Time | Opponent | Rank | TV | Venue | Score | Win | Loss | Save | Attendance | Overall record | NCAAT record |
|---|---|---|---|---|---|---|---|---|---|---|---|---|
| May 29 | 6:00 p.m. | (3) Texas State (Upper Bracket Regional) | (2) | ESPN+ | Blue Bell Park • College Station, Texas | **L 3–4** | Wade Cooper (7–3) | **Troy Adams (1–4)** | None | 6,956 | 43–16 | 0–1 |
| May 30 | 1:00 p.m. | (4) Lamar (Lower Regional Loser Bracket - Elimintion Game) | (2) | ESPN+ | Blue Bell Park • College Station, Texas | **W 19–6** | **Chase Herrell (4–4)** | Travis Lutz (4–3) | None | 6,981 | 44–16 | 1–1 |
| May 31 | 1:00 p.m. | (3) Texas State (Lower Regional Loser Bracket - Elimintion Game) | (2) | ESPN+ | Blue Bell Park • College Station, Texas | **W 15–4** | **Sax Matson (2–2)** | Cade Smith (4–3) | None | 6,885 | 45–16 | 2–1 |
| May 31 | 6:00 p.m. | (1) No. 11 Texas A&M (Regional Finals) | (2) | ESPN | Blue Bell Park • College Station, Texas | **W 14–3** | **Andrew Johnson (8–2)** | Ethan Darden (4–4) | None | 6,934 | 46–16 | 3–1 |
| June 1 | 6:00 PM. | (1) No. 11 Texas A&M (Regional Finals - Game 7 - Elimination Game) | (2) | ESPN2 | Blue Bell Park • College Station, Texas | **W 7–1** | **Chase Herrell (5–4)** | Clayton Freshcorn (4–3) | None | 7,042 | 47–16 | 4–1 |

Chapel Hill Super Regional (1–2)

| Date | Time | Opponent | Rank | TV | Venue | Score | Win | Loss | Save | Attendance | Overall record | NCAAT record |
|---|---|---|---|---|---|---|---|---|---|---|---|---|
| June 5 (Game 1) | 12:00 p.m. | (5) No. 4 North Carolina | (2) | ESPN2 | Boshamer Stadium • Chapel Hill, North Carolina | **W 9–5** | **Chase Herrell (6–4)** | Walker McDuffie (7–3) | **Andrew Johnson (1)** | 3,847 | 48–16 | 1–0 |
| June 6 (Game 2) | 11:00 a.m. | (5) No. 4 North Carolina | (2) | ESPN | Boshamer Stadium • Chapel Hill, North Carolina | **L 0–4** | Decaro (11–2) | **Govel (10–3)** | None | 3,951 | 48–17 | 1–1 |
| June 7 (Game 3) | 12:00 p.m. | (5) No. 4 North Carolina | (2) | ESPN | Boshamer Stadium • Chapel Hill, North Carolina | **L 3–4** | McDuffie (8–3) | **Herrell (6–5)** | None | 3,913 | 48–18 | 1–2 |

"#" represents ranking. All rankings from D1 Baseball Poll on the date of the contest.
"()" represents postseason seeding in the Big Ten Tournament or NCAA Regional, respectively.
= Win, = Loss, = Canceled/Postponed
Bold = **USC Trojans team member**
* = Non-Conference Game
Schedule Source:

=== Postseason ===
==== Single elimination bracket ====
Quarterfinals; May 22
**4** | **USC** | **7**
12 | Michigan State | 0
**1** | **UCLA** | **4**
5 | Purdue | 3
**2** | **Nebraska** | **6**
7 | Michigan | 4
**3** | **Oregon** | **9**
11 | Washington | 4

Semifinals May 23
4 | USC | 5
**1** | **UCLA** | **7**
2 | Nebraska | 0
**3** | **Oregon** | **8**

Final May 24
**1** | **UCLA** | **3^{(11)}**
3 | Oregon | 2

==== NCAA Tournament ====
Regional | Regional
**1** | **North Carolina** | **8**
4 | VCU | 0
**1** | **North Carolina** | **7**
3 | East Carolina | 5
**3** | **East Carolina** | **7^{14}**
2 | Tennessee | 3
Chapel Hill Regional – Boshamer Stadium
2 | Tennessee | 4
**4** | **VCU** | **5**
4 | VCU | 0
**3** | **East Carolina** | **10**
**1** | **Texas A&M** | **7**
4 | Lamar | 5
**1** | **Texas A&M** | **17**
3 | Texas State | 2
**3** | **Texas State** | **5**
2 | USC | 4
College Station Regional – Olsen Field at Blue Bell Park
4 | Lamar | 6
**2** | **USC** | **19**
**2** | **USC** | **15**
3 | Texas State | 4

Regional Final
**1** | **North Carolina** | **9** | -
3 | East Carolina | 0 | -
1 | Texas A&M | 3
**2** | **USC** | **14**

Super Regional; June 5–7
5 | North Carolina | 5
**USC** | **9**

== Game summaries ==
=== vs Pepperdine ===
==== Game 1 ====
February 13 6:05 P.M. (PST) at Dedeaux Field • Los Angeles, California Clear, 62 °F (17 °C)
| Team | 1 | 2 | 3 | 4 | 5 | 6 | 7 | 8 | 9 | R | H | E |
|---|---|---|---|---|---|---|---|---|---|---|---|---|
| Pepperdine Waves | 0 | 0 | 0 | 0 | 0 | 0 | 0 | 1 | 0 | 1 | 5 | 1 |
| USC Trojans | 2 | 0 | 0 | 0 | 0 | 0 | 1 | 0 | x | 3 | 3 | 1 |
WP: Mason Edwards (1-0) LP: Tommy Scavone (0-1) Sv: Adam Troy (1); Home runs: Away: None; Home: None; Attendance: 1,598; Boxscore

==== Game 2 ====
February 14 6:05 P.M. (PST) at Dedeaux Field • Los Angeles, California Partly Cloudy, 61 °F (16 °C)
| Team | 1 | 2 | 3 | 4 | 5 | 6 | 7 | R | H | E |
|---|---|---|---|---|---|---|---|---|---|---|
| Pepperdine Waves | 0 | 0 | 0 | 0 | 0 | 0 | 0 | 0 | 0 | 1 |
| USC Trojans (No Hitter) | 1 | 0 | 0 | 1 | 4 | 0 | 5 | 11 | 11 | 0 |
WP: Grant Govel (1-0) LP: Collin Valentine (0-1) Sv: None; Home runs: Away: None; Home: Dean Carpentier, Andrew Lamb (1); Attendance: 1,087; Boxscore

==== Game 3 ====
February 15 12:05 P.M. (PST) at Dedeaux Field • Los Angeles, California Cloudy, 63 °F (17 °C)
| Team | 1 | 2 | 3 | 4 | 5 | 6 | 7 | 8 | 9 | R | H | E |
|---|---|---|---|---|---|---|---|---|---|---|---|---|
| Pepperdine Waves | 0 | 0 | 0 | 0 | 0 | 0 | 4 | 1 | 0 | 5 | 10 | 0 |
| USC Trojans | 0 | 0 | 2 | 4 | 0 | 1 | 0 | 1 | x | 8 | 5 | 1 |
WP: Andrew Johnson (1-0) LP: Dylan Stewart (0-1) Sv: Adam Troy (2); Home runs: Away: None; Home: Jack Basseer (1); Attendance: 1,324; Boxscore

=== vs Loyola Marymount ===
February 18 6:05 P.M. (PST) at Dedeaux Field • Los Angeles, California Partly Cloudy, 52 °F (11 °C)
| Team | 1 | 2 | 3 | 4 | 5 | 6 | 7 | R | H | E |
|---|---|---|---|---|---|---|---|---|---|---|
| Loyola Marymount Lions | 0 | 1 | 0 | 3 | 0 | 0 | 0 | 4 | 6 | 2 |
| USC Trojans | 0 | 2 | 1 | 1 | 4 | 5 | 1 | 14 | 11 | 0 |
WP: Cameron Fausset (1-0) LP: Jacob Fried (0-1) Sv: None; Home runs: Away: Jake Lyall (1); Home: Jack Basseer (2); Attendance: 414; Boxscore

=== vs Rice ===
==== Game 1 ====
February 20 6:05 P.M. (PST) at Dedeaux Field • Los Angeles, California Clear, 50 °F (10 °C)
| Team | 1 | 2 | 3 | 4 | 5 | 6 | 7 | 8 | 9 | R | H | E |
|---|---|---|---|---|---|---|---|---|---|---|---|---|
| Rice Owls | 0 | 0 | 0 | 0 | 0 | 0 | 0 | 0 | 0 | 0 | 2 | 1 |
| USC Trojans | 0 | 0 | 1 | 1 | 0 | 0 | 3 | 0 | x | 5 | 7 | 0 |
WP: Mason Edwards (2-0) LP: Brayden Sharp (1-1) Sv: Gavin Lauridsen (1); Home runs: Away: None; Home: Will Stickney (1); Attendance: 1,118; Boxscore

==== Game 2 ====
February 21 6:05 P.M. (PST) at Dedeaux Field • Los Angeles, California Partly Cloudy, 60 °F (16 °C)
| Team | 1 | 2 | 3 | 4 | 5 | 6 | 7 | 8 | 9 | R | H | E |
|---|---|---|---|---|---|---|---|---|---|---|---|---|
| Rice Owls | 0 | 0 | 0 | 0 | 0 | 0 | 1 | 0 | 0 | 1 | 3 | 1 |
| USC Trojans | 0 | 0 | 1 | 1 | 2 | 0 | 0 | 0 | x | 4 | 6 | 0 |
WP: Grant Govel (2-0) LP: Ryland Urbancyzk (0-1) Sv: Adam Troy (3); Home runs: Away: None; Home: None; Attendance: 1,097; Boxscore

==== Game 3 ====
February 22 12:05 P.M. (PST) at Dedeaux Field • Los Angeles, California Sunny, 72 °F (22 °C)
| Team | 1 | 2 | 3 | 4 | 5 | 6 | 7 | 8 | 9 | R | H | E |
|---|---|---|---|---|---|---|---|---|---|---|---|---|
| Rice Owls | 0 | 1 | 0 | 0 | 0 | 0 | 0 | 1 | 0 | 2 | 7 | 1 |
| USC Trojans | 2 | 0 | 2 | 0 | 0 | 0 | 0 | 0 | x | 4 | 5 | 1 |
WP: Andrew Johnson (2-0) LP: Ethan Sanders (0-1) Sv: Adam Troy (4); Home runs: Away: None; Home: Augie Lopez (1); Attendance: 1,265; Boxscore

=== at Cal Poly ===
==== Game 1 ====
February 26 6:05 P.M. (PST) at Robin Baggett Stadium • San Luis Obispo, California Partly Cloudy, 74 °F (23 °C)
| Team | 1 | 2 | 3 | 4 | 5 | 6 | 7 | 8 | 9 | R | H | E |
|---|---|---|---|---|---|---|---|---|---|---|---|---|
| USC Trojans | 0 | 0 | 2 | 0 | 1 | 0 | 1 | 0 | 0 | 4 | 7 | 0 |
| Cal Poly Mustangs | 0 | 0 | 0 | 0 | 0 | 0 | 0 | 0 | 0 | 0 | 5 | 0 |
WP: Chase Herrell (1-0) LP: Pettey Corden (1-1) Sv: None; Home runs: Away: None; Home: None; Attendance: 1,587; Boxscore

==== Game 2 ====
February 27 6:05 P.M. (PST) at Robin Baggett Stadium • San Luis Obispo, California Partly Cloudy, 70 °F (21 °C)
| Team | 1 | 2 | 3 | 4 | 5 | 6 | 7 | 8 | 9 | 10 | 11 | R | H | E |
|---|---|---|---|---|---|---|---|---|---|---|---|---|---|---|
| USC Trojans | 0 | 0 | 0 | 0 | 0 | 0 | 0 | 0 | 0 | 0 | 6 | 6 | 11 | 2 |
| Cal Poly Mustangs | 0 | 0 | 0 | 0 | 0 | 0 | 0 | 0 | 0 | 0 | 0 | 0 | 1 | 0 |
WP: Sax Matson (1-0) LP: Sean McGrath (0-1) Sv: None; Home runs: Away: None; Home: None; Attendance: 2,508; Boxscore

==== Game 3 ====
February 28 3:05 P.M. (PST) at Robin Baggett Stadium • San Luis Obispo, California Sunny, 75 °F (24 °C)
| Team | 1 | 2 | 3 | 4 | 5 | 6 | 7 | 8 | 9 | R | H | E |
|---|---|---|---|---|---|---|---|---|---|---|---|---|
| USC Trojans | 0 | 2 | 6 | 1 | 5 | 0 | 2 | 0 | 0 | 16 | 21 | 2 |
| Cal Poly Mustangs | 1 | 0 | 0 | 0 | 0 | 0 | 1 | 0 | 0 | 2 | 5 | 2 |
WP: Grant Govel (3-0) LP: Laif Palmer (1-2) Sv: None; Home runs: Away: Ryan Tayman (1); Home: Kevin Takeuchi, Jack Basseer, Maximo Martinez (1); Attendance: 2,612; Boxscore

==== Game 4 ====
March 1 1:05 P.M. (PST) at Robin Baggett Stadium • San Louis Obispo, California Partly Cloudy, 66 °F (19 °C)
| Team | 1 | 2 | 3 | 4 | 5 | 6 | 7 | 8 | 9 | 10 | 11 | R | H | E |
|---|---|---|---|---|---|---|---|---|---|---|---|---|---|---|
| USC Trojans | 1 | 1 | 0 | 0 | 0 | 0 | 2 | 0 | 2 | 0 | 2 | 8 | 11 | 1 |
| Cal Poly Mustangs | 0 | 0 | 0 | 0 | 0 | 0 | 1 | 0 | 5 | 0 | 0 | 6 | 10 | 2 |
WP: Gavin Lauridsen (1-0) LP: Sean McGrath (0-2) Sv: None; Home runs: Away: Ryan Tayman, Xander McLaurin (1); Home: None; Attendance: 2,308; Boxscore

=== vs UC Irvine ===
March 3 6:05 P.M. (PST) at Dedeaux Field • Los Angeles, California Partly Cloudy, 64 °F (18 °C)
| Team | 1 | 2 | 3 | 4 | 5 | 6 | 7 | 8 | 9 | R | H | E |
|---|---|---|---|---|---|---|---|---|---|---|---|---|
| UC Irvine Anteaters | 3 | 0 | 0 | 0 | 0 | 1 | 0 | 0 | 0 | 4 | 8 | 1 |
| USC Trojans | 1 | 1 | 2 | 0 | 0 | 0 | 0 | 2 | x | 6 | 8 | 0 |
WP: Cameron Fausset (2-0) LP: Ryder Brooks (0-1) Sv: Sax Matson (1); Home runs: Away: Tommy Farmer (1); Home: Abbrie Covarrubias, Augie Lopez (1); Attendance: 598; Boxscore

=== vs Illinois ===
==== Game 1 ====
March 6 6:05 P.M. (PST) at Dedeaux Field • Los Angeles, California Clear, 66 °F (19 °C)
| Team | 1 | 2 | 3 | 4 | 5 | 6 | 7 | 8 | 9 | R | H | E |
|---|---|---|---|---|---|---|---|---|---|---|---|---|
| Illinois Fighting Illini | 0 | 0 | 0 | 0 | 0 | 0 | 0 | 0 | 0 | 0 | 2 | 2 |
| USC Trojans | 3 | 0 | 0 | 0 | 0 | 0 | 0 | 1 | x | 4 | 6 | 2 |
WP: Mason Edwards (3-0) LP: Ben Plumley (1-2) Sv: None; Home runs: Away: None; Home: Adrian Lopez (1); Attendance: 1,328; Boxscore

==== Game 2 ====
March 7 1:05 P.M. (PST) at Dedeaux Field • Los Angeles, California Windy, Sunny, 76 °F (24 °C)
| Team | 1 | 2 | 3 | 4 | 5 | 6 | 7 | 8 | 9 | R | H | E |
|---|---|---|---|---|---|---|---|---|---|---|---|---|
| Illinois Fighting Illini | 0 | 0 | 0 | 0 | 0 | 0 | 0 | 0 | 0 | 0 | 6 | 1 |
| USC Trojans | 2 | 0 | 0 | 0 | 0 | 2 | 0 | 0 | x | 4 | 7 | 0 |
WP: Grant Govel (4-0) LP: Regan Hall (2-1) Sv: None; Home runs: Away: None; Home: None; Attendance: 1,119; Boxscore

==== Game 3 ====
March 8 11:05 A.M. (PST) at Dedeaux Field • Los Angeles, California Sunny, 78 °F (26 °C)
| Team | 1 | 2 | 3 | 4 | 5 | 6 | 7 | 8 | 9 | R | H | E |
|---|---|---|---|---|---|---|---|---|---|---|---|---|
| Illinois Fighting Illini | 2 | 0 | 0 | 0 | 0 | 0 | 0 | 1 | 0 | 3 | 7 | 0 |
| USC Trojans | 0 | 1 | 0 | 2 | 1 | 1 | 0 | 0 | x | 5 | 11 | 2 |
WP: Diego Velazquez (1-0) LP: Kyle Remington (2-1) Sv: Troy Adam (5); Home runs: Away: None; Home: Jack Basseer (1); Attendance: 1,273; Boxscore

=== vs Long Beach State ===
March 10 6:35 P.M. (PST) at Dedeaux Field • Los Angeles, California Clear, 65 °F (18 °C)
| Team | 1 | 2 | 3 | 4 | 5 | 6 | 7 | 8 | 9 | R | H | E |
|---|---|---|---|---|---|---|---|---|---|---|---|---|
| Long Beach State Beach | 0 | 0 | 0 | 1 | 0 | 0 | 0 | 0 | 0 | 1 | 3 | 2 |
| No. 25 USC Trojans | 0 | 3 | 1 | 0 | 0 | 0 | 0 | 2 | x | 6 | 9 | 0 |
WP: Chase Herrell (2-0) LP: Van Larson (0-2) Sv: None; Home runs: Away: None; Home: Andrew Lamb (1); Attendance: 1,026; Boxscore

=== vs San Diego ===
March 11 6:35 P.M. (PST) at Dedeaux Field • Los Angeles, California Clear, 70 °F (21 °C)
| Team | 1 | 2 | 3 | 4 | 5 | 6 | 7 | 8 | 9 | 10 | R | H | E |
|---|---|---|---|---|---|---|---|---|---|---|---|---|---|
| San Diego Torriers | 0 | 0 | 0 | 2 | 1 | 0 | 3 | 0 | 0 | 0 | 6 | 6 | 0 |
| No. 25 USC Trojans | 0 | 0 | 1 | 3 | 0 | 1 | 1 | 0 | 0 | 1 | 7 | 13 | 1 |
WP: Troy Adam (1-0) LP: Cody Hayden (0-1) Sv: None; Home runs: Away: Jayden Lobliner (1); Home: Andrew Lamb (1); Attendance: 786; Boxscore

=== at Northwestern ===
==== Game 1 ====
March 13 1:00 P.M. (PST) at Rocky Miller Park • Evanston, Illinois Cloudy, 44 °F (7 °C)
| Team | 1 | 2 | 3 | 4 | 5 | 6 | 7 | R | H | E |
|---|---|---|---|---|---|---|---|---|---|---|
| No. 25 USC Trojans | 0 | 0 | 4 | 2 | 6 | 1 | 2 | 15 | 13 | 0 |
| Northwestern Wildcats | 0 | 0 | 0 | 0 | 0 | 1 | 0 | 1 | 3 | 2 |
WP: Mason Edwards (4-0) LP: Ryan Weaver (0-2) Sv: None; Home runs: Away: Abbrie Covarrubias, Adrian Lopez, Andrew Lamb, and Richard Tejeda (1); Home: Jack Lausch (1); Attendance: 140; Boxscore

==== Game 2 (Game 1 (DH)) ====
March 14 9:00 A.M. (PST) at Rocky Miller Park • Evanston, Illinois Cloudy, 35 °F (2 °C)
| Team | 1 | 2 | 3 | 4 | 5 | 6 | 7 | 8 | 9 | R | H | E |
|---|---|---|---|---|---|---|---|---|---|---|---|---|
| No. 25 USC Trojans | 0 | 0 | 0 | 0 | 0 | 1 | 0 | 1 | 0 | 2 | 4 | 0 |
| Northwestern Wilcats | 0 | 0 | 0 | 0 | 0 | 0 | 0 | 0 | 0 | 0 | 2 | 0 |
WP: Grant Govel (5-0) LP: Jake Rifenburg (2-1) Sv: Troy Adam (6); Home runs: Away: None; Home: None; Attendance: 215; Boxscore

==== Game 3 (Game 2 (DH)) ====
March 14 12:20 P.M. (PST) at Rockey Miller Park • Evanston, Illinois Cloudy, 35 °F (2 °C)
| Team | 1 | 2 | 3 | 4 | 5 | 6 | 7 | 8 | 9 | R | H | E |
|---|---|---|---|---|---|---|---|---|---|---|---|---|
| No.25 USC Trojans | 0 | 0 | 0 | 0 | 0 | 0 | 0 | 1 | 0 | 1 | 3 | 0 |
| Northwestern Wildcats | 1 | 0 | 0 | 0 | 0 | 0 | 0 | 0 | 1 | 2 | 4 | 0 |
WP: Sam Hliboki (2-2) LP: Troy Adam (1-1) Sv: None; Home runs: Away: None; Home: None; Attendance: 230; Boxscore

=== vs San Diego State ===
March 17 6:30 P.M. (PST) at Dedeaux Field • Los Angeles, California Sunny, 88 °F (31 °C)
| Team | 1 | 2 | 3 | 4 | 5 | 6 | 7 | 8 | 9 | R | H | E |
|---|---|---|---|---|---|---|---|---|---|---|---|---|
| San Diego State Aztecs | 2 | 0 | 0 | 0 | 0 | 0 | 2 | 0 | 0 | 4 | 8 | 0 |
| No. 13 USC Trojans | 4 | 0 | 0 | 0 | 0 | 0 | 0 | 3 | X | 7 | 7 | 0 |
WP: Diego Velazquez (2-0) LP: Adian Russell (2-1) Sv: Troy Adam (7); Home runs: Away: None; Home: None; Attendance: 893; Boxscore

=== vs Cal State Bakersfield ===
March 18 6:30 P.M. (PST) at Dedeaux Field • Los Angeles, California Sunny, 85 °F (29 °C)
| Team | 1 | 2 | 3 | 4 | 5 | 6 | 7 | 8 | 9 | R | H | E |
|---|---|---|---|---|---|---|---|---|---|---|---|---|
| Cal State Bakersfield Roadrunners | 0 | 0 | 2 | 1 | 0 | 1 | 0 | 0 | 0 | 3 | 6 | 1 |
| No. 13 USC Trojans | 0 | 0 | 0 | 0 | 0 | 2 | 0 | 0 | 2 | 4 | 4 | 0 |
WP: Henry Chabot (1-0) LP: Jeter Schuerman (0-1) Sv: None; Home runs: Away: None; Home: Jack Basseer (1); Attendance: 867; Boxscore

=== vs Washington ===
==== Game 1 ====
March 20 7:00 P.M. (PST) at Dedeaux Field • Los Angeles, California Cool, 77 °F (25 °C)
| Team | 1 | 2 | 3 | 4 | 5 | 6 | 7 | 8 | 9 | R | H | E |
|---|---|---|---|---|---|---|---|---|---|---|---|---|
| Washington Huskies | 0 | 0 | 0 | 0 | 0 | 0 | 0 | 0 | 0 | 0 | 2 | 3 |
| No. 13 USC Trojans | 0 | 0 | 2 | 2 | 0 | 1 | 0 | 0 | X | 5 | 6 | 0 |
WP: Mason Edwards (5-0) LP: Kenney Noah (1-2) Sv: Gavin Lauridsen (2); Home runs: Away: None; Home: None; Attendance: 1,067; Boxscore

==== Game 2 ====
March 21 7:00 P.M. (PST) at Dedeaux Field • Los Angeles, California Cool, 73 °F (23 °C)
| Team | 1 | 2 | 3 | 4 | 5 | 6 | 7 | 8 | 9 | R | H | E |
|---|---|---|---|---|---|---|---|---|---|---|---|---|
| Washington Huskies | 0 | 1 | 0 | 0 | 0 | 1 | 0 | 0 | 0 | 2 | 6 | 3 |
| No. 13 USC Trojans | 3 | 4 | 0 | 0 | 0 | 0 | 0 | 0 | X | 7 | 12 | 0 |
WP: Grant Govel (6-0) LP: Jackson Thomas (1-1) Sv: None; Home runs: Away: Bolton Bower (1); Home: Augie Lopez (1); Attendance: 1,208; Boxscore

==== Game 3 ====
March 22 1:00 P.M. (PST) at Dedeaux Field • Los Angeles, California Partly Cloudy, 75 °F (24 °C)
| Team | 1 | 2 | 3 | 4 | 5 | 6 | 7 | R | H | E |
|---|---|---|---|---|---|---|---|---|---|---|
| Washington Huskies | 1 | 0 | 1 | 1 | 1 | 1 | 0 | 4 | 7 | 0 |
| No. 13 USC Trojans | 5 | 1 | 2 | 0 | 2 | 3 | 1 | 14 | 11 | 0 |
WP: Henry Chabot (2-0) LP: Hayden Lewis (2-3) Sv: None; Home runs: Away: Jackson Hotchkiss (2); Home: Andrew Lamb, Brock Slanton (1); Attendance: 1,087; Boxscore

== Big Ten Tournament ==
=== (12) Michigan State (Quarterfinals) ===
May 22 9:00 A.M. (PST) at Charles Schwab Field • Omaha, Nebraska Mostly Cloudy, 60 °F (16 °C)
| Team | 1 | 2 | 3 | 4 | 5 | 6 | 7 | 8 | 9 | R | H | E |
|---|---|---|---|---|---|---|---|---|---|---|---|---|
| (12) Michigan State Spartans | 0 | 0 | 0 | 0 | 0 | 0 | 0 | 0 | 0 | 0 | 6 | 0 |
| (4) No. 25 USC Trojans | 2 | 0 | 2 | 0 | 3 | 0 | 0 | 0 | X | 7 | 9 | 0 |
WP: None LP: None Sv: None; Home runs: Away: None; Home: None; Boxscore

=== (1) No. 1 UCLA (Semifinals - Rivalry) ===
May 23 12:00 P.M. (PST) at Charles Schwab Field • Omaha, Nebraska Partly Sunny, 72 °F (22 °C)
| Team | 1 | 2 | 3 | 4 | 5 | 6 | 7 | 8 | 9 | R | H | E |
|---|---|---|---|---|---|---|---|---|---|---|---|---|
| (4) No. 25 USC Trojans | 1 | 0 | 2 | 0 | 0 | 0 | 0 | 0 | 0 | 5 | 10 | 0 |
| (1) No. 1 UCLA Bruins | 0 | 0 | 1 | 1 | 0 | 0 | 2 | 0 | 3 | 7 | 15 | 2 |
WP: Eason Hawks (5-2) LP: Troy Adam (1-3) Sv: None; Home runs: Away: None; Home: Dean West, Mulivai Levu (1); Boxscore

== NCAA Tournament ==
=== (3) Texas State (College Station Upper Bracket Regional) ===
May 29 6:00 P.M. (PST) at Olsen Field at Blue Bell Park • College Station, Texas
| Team | 1 | 2 | 3 | 4 | 5 | 6 | 7 | 8 | 9 | R | H | E |
|---|---|---|---|---|---|---|---|---|---|---|---|---|
| (3) Texas State Bobcats | - | - | - | - | - | - | - | - | - | - | - | - |
| (2) USC Trojans | - | - | - | - | - | - | - | - | - | - | - | - |
Boxscore

== Rankings ==
Ranking movements Legend: ██ Increase in ranking ██ Decrease in ranking — = Not ranked RV = Received votes
| | Week | | | | | | | | | | | | | | | | | |
| Poll | Pre | 1 | 2 | 3 | 4 | 5 | 6 | 7 | 8 | 9 | 10 | 11 | 12 | 13 | 14 | 15 | 16 | Final |
|---|---|---|---|---|---|---|---|---|---|---|---|---|---|---|---|---|---|---|
| Coaches' | RV | RV* | RV | 25 | 19 | 11 | 10 | 8 | 10 | 9 | 23 | 17 | 16 | 13 | 19 | 19 | 19* | 15 |
| Baseball America | — | — | — | 22 | 20 | 13 | 12 | 9 | 11 | 10 | 21 | 19 | 17 | 14 | 22 | 22* | 22* | 11 |
| NCBWA† | RV | RV | RV | RV | 20 | 17 | 12 | 9 | 13 | 8 | 23 | 20 | 17 | 14 | 18 | 18* | 10 | 14 |
| D1Baseball | — | — | — | — | 25 | 13 | 12 | 12 | 14 | 12 | 23 | 21 | 18 | 17 | 25 | — | —* | 15 |
| Perfect Game | — | — | 25 | 20 | 12 | 10 | 5 | 7 | 11 | 9 | 24 | 19 | 19 | 16 | 19 | 19* | 19* | 13 |

† NCBWA ranks 30 teams in their preseason poll, but only ranks 25 teams weekly during the season.
* A new poll was not released for this week, so for comparison purposes, the previous week's ranking is inserted in this week's slot.
