= Reggie Willits =

American baseball player & coach (born 1981)

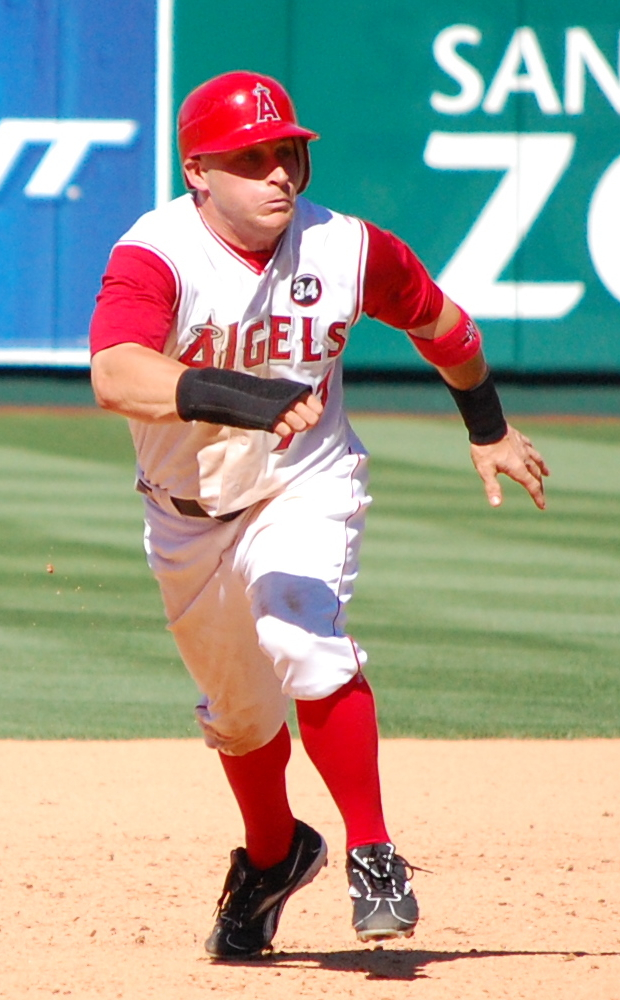
- Willits while with the Angels

Oklahoma Sooners
- Outfielder / Coach
- Born: May 30, 1981 (age 45); Chickasha, Oklahoma, U.S.
- Batted: Switch Threw: Right

MLB debut
- April 26, 2006, for the Los Angeles Angels of Anaheim

Last MLB appearance
- June 3, 2011, for the Los Angeles Angels of Anaheim

MLB statistics
- Batting average: .258
- Home runs: 0
- Runs batted in: 58
- Stolen bases: 40
- Stats at Baseball Reference

Teams
- As player: Los Angeles Angels of Anaheim (2006–2011); As coach: New York Yankees (2018–2021)

Reggie Gene Willits (born May 30, 1981) is an American former professional baseball outfielder and associate head baseball coach for the Oklahoma Sooners. He played in Major League Baseball (MLB) for the Los Angeles Angels of Anaheim from 2006 through 2011, and was the first base coach for the New York Yankees from 2018 through 2021.

== Early life ==
Reggie is the son of Gene and Judy Willits of Fort Cobb, Oklahoma. He attended junior high and high school at Fort Cobb-Broxton. He attended Seminole State College in Seminole, Oklahoma, and transferred to the University of Oklahoma, where he played for the Oklahoma Sooners.

== Playing career ==
The Los Angeles Angels of Anaheim selected Willits in the seventh round, with the 210th overall selection, of the 2003 Major League Baseball draft. He made his professional debut with the rookie-level Provo Angels, batting .300 in 59 games. Willits spent 2004 with the High-A Rancho Cucamonga Quakes, playing in 135 games and hitting .283/.373/.363 with five home runs, 52 RBI, and 44 stolen bases. Willits made 123 appearances for the Double-A Arkansas Travelers in 2005, slashing .304/.377/.388 with two home runs, 46 RBI, and 40 stolen bases.

Willits made his Major League Baseball debut with the Angels on April 26, 2006. In 28 games during his rookie campaign, he batted .267/.411/.289 with two RBI and four stolen bases.

Willits made the Angels' Opening Day roster in 2007. He appeared in 136 games for the Angels, slashing .293/.391/.344 with no home runs, 34 RBI, and 27 stolen bases. Willits played in 82 games for the team in 2008, batting .194/.321/.231 with seven RBI and two stolen bases. He played in 49 contests for the Angels during the 2009 season, hitting .213/.256/.238 with six RBI and five stolen bases.

Willits made 97 appearances for Los Angeles in 2010, batting .258/.341/.302 with eight RBI and two stolen bases. He played in 22 games for the team in 2011, going 1-for-22 (.045) with one RBI.

On August 17, 2011, Willits was designated for assignment by the Angels after five seasons in Anaheim. He cleared waivers and was sent outright to the Triple-A Salt Lake Bees on August 19. During his career Willits played 234 games for the Bees spread out over six years. His 2006 season with the Bees was notable for his .327 batting average, three home runs, and 31 stolen bases.

Willits elected free agency on September 29.

== Coaching career ==
In 2013, Willits became the head baseball coach for Binger-Oney High School. Willits joined the New York Yankees' organization in 2015 as their outfield and baserunning coordinator. He was promoted to first base coach for the 2018 season.

After the 2021 season, Willits accepted a volunteer coaching assistant position with the Oklahoma Sooners.

== Personal life ==
Willits married Amber Klugh of Fort Cobb; they met while in the sixth grade and married while attending the University of Oklahoma. They have three children: Jaxon, Hunter and Eli. Eli was chosen as the first overall pick in the 2025 Major League Baseball draft by the Washington Nationals. Amber runs the Double Seven Ranch, a hereford cattle ranch in Fort Cobb. Reggie has an older sister, Wendi Willits Wells, who played basketball at Arkansas and for the Los Angeles Sparks of the WNBA. She has been head girls' basketball coach at Shawnee (Oklahoma) High School since 2008-09. Her teams have reached the state tournament the last four years and won the 5A championship in 2011-12.

Willits and his wife began building a home in 2003 in Fort Cobb, with the first completed structure a standalone 60-by-35 foot batting cage. Willits decided to save money and work on his game by moving the family into the batting cage, outfitted with an open plan. In 2007, the home was completed. Reggie was named after Reggie Jackson.

Sporting positions
Preceded by Tony Peña	New York Yankees First Base Coach; 2018–2021	Succeeded by Travis Chapman
