= 2026 Mississippi State Bulldogs baseball team =

American college baseball season

2026 Mississippi State Bulldogs baseball

Starkville Regional Champions

Athens Super Regional, 0–2
- Conference: Southeastern Conference

Ranking
- Coaches: No. 13
- D1Baseball.com: No. 14
- Record: 43–19 (16–14 SEC)
- Head coach: Brian O'Connor (1st season)
- Assistant coaches: Kevin McMullan; Matt Kirby; Justin Parker
- Home stadium: Dudy Noble Field

2026 Southeastern Conference baseball standings
| | Conf. | | | | Overall |
| Team | W | | L | PCT | W | | L | PCT |
|---|---|---|---|---|---|---|---|---|
| No. 3 Georgia ‍†‍‡‍^{y} | 23 | – | 7 | .767 | 53 | – | 14 | .791 |
| No. 5 Texas ‍‍‍^{y} | 19 | – | 10 | .655 | 46 | – | 15 | .754 |
| No. 17 Texas A&M ‍‍‍^{y} | 18 | – | 11 | .621 | 41 | – | 16 | .719 |
| No. 6 Alabama ‍‍‍^{y} | 18 | – | 12 | .600 | 42 | – | 21 | .667 |
| No. 16 Florida ‍‍‍^{y} | 18 | – | 12 | .600 | 41 | – | 21 | .661 |
| No. 9 Auburn ‍‍‍^{y} | 17 | – | 13 | .567 | 42 | – | 22 | .656 |
| No. 23 Arkansas ‍‍‍^{y} | 17 | – | 13 | .567 | 41 | – | 22 | .651 |
| No. 14 Mississippi State ‍‍‍^{y} | 16 | – | 14 | .533 | 43 | – | 19 | .694 |
| No. 7 Ole Miss ‍‍‍^{y} | 15 | – | 15 | .500 | 41 | – | 23 | .641 |
| Tennessee ‍‍‍^{y} | 15 | – | 15 | .500 | 38 | – | 22 | .633 |
| No. 1 Oklahoma ‍‍‍^{y} | 14 | – | 16 | .467 | 43 | – | 23 | .652 |
| Vanderbilt ‍‍‍ | 14 | – | 16 | .467 | 33 | – | 25 | .569 |
| Kentucky ‍‍‍^{y} | 13 | – | 17 | .433 | 33 | – | 23 | .589 |
| LSU ‍‍‍ | 9 | – | 21 | .300 | 30 | – | 28 | .517 |
| South Carolina ‍‍‍ | 7 | – | 23 | .233 | 22 | – | 35 | .386 |
| Missouri ‍‍‍ | 6 | – | 24 | .200 | 24 | – | 31 | .436 |
† – Conference champion ‡ – Tournament champion y – Invited to the NCAA Tournament; As of June 22, 2026; Rankings from D1Baseball

The 2026 Mississippi State Bulldogs baseball team represented Mississippi State University in the 2026 NCAA Division I baseball season. The Bulldogs played their home games at Dudy Noble Field, and were led by first year head coach Brian O'Connor.

== Previous season ==
The Bulldogs finished 36–23 and 15–15 in the Southeastern Conference (SEC) to finish 11th place in the SEC.

== Preseason ==
=== SEC Awards and honors ===
In February, the SEC named its 2026 Preseason All-SEC Teams and awards.

Preseason All-SEC Team
| Player | No. | Position | Team | Class |

=== Coaching staff ===
2026 Mississippi State Bulldogs coaching staff
| Name | Position | Seasons at Mississippi State | Alma Mater |
|---|---|---|---|
| Brian O'Connor | Head coach | 1 | Creighton (1993) |
| Kevin McMullen | Associate head coach | 1 | IUP (1990) |
| Matt Kirby | Assistant coach | 1 | William & Mary (2003) |
| Justin Parker | Assistant pitching coach | 3 | Wright State (2012) |

=== SEC Coaches' Poll ===
In the SEC Preseason Coaches' Poll released in February, the team was predicted to finish third in the SEC.

Coaches' Poll
| Prediction | Team | Votes (1st) |
|---|---|---|
| 1 | LSU | 231 (9) |
| 2 | Texas | 214 (1) |
| 3 | Mississippi State | 205 (4) |
| 4 | Arkansas | 203 (2) |
| 5 | Auburn | 175 |
| 6 | Tennessee | 162 |
| 7 | Florida | 156 |
| 8 | Vanderbilt | 151 |
| 9 | Georgia | 133 |
| 10 | Ole Miss | 110 |
| 11 | Kentucky | 99 |
| 12 | Alabama | 87 |
| 13 | Texas A&M | 86 |
| 14 | Oklahoma | 84 |
| 15 | South Carolina | 49 |
| 16 | Missouri | 31 |

2026 Mississippi State Bulldogs baseball team
Players
Coaches

| # | Pos. | Name | B/T | Height | Weight | Year | Home town |
|---|---|---|---|---|---|---|---|
| 2 | OF | Jacob Parker | L/R | 6 ft 3 in (1.91 m) | 220 lb (100 kg) | Fr | (Mississippi) Purvis |
| 3 | INF | Ace Reese | L/R | 6 ft 4 in (1.93 m) | 220 lb (100 kg) | Jr | (Texas) Canton |
| 4 | LHP | Tomas Valincius | L/L | 6 ft 2 in (1.88 m) | 225 lb (102 kg) | So | (Illinois) Lockport |
| 5 | OF | Aidan Teel | L/R | 6 ft 0 in (1.83 m) | 200 lb (91 kg) | RS Jr | (New Jersey) Mahwah |
| 6 | OF | James Nunnallee | L/R | 6 ft 1 in (1.85 m) | 190 lb (86 kg) | So | (California) San Diego |
| 7 | UTL | Reed Stallman | L/R | 6 ft 3 in (1.91 m) | 220 lb (100 kg) | Gr | (Iowa) Robins |
| 8 | LHP | Charlie Foster | R/L | 6 ft 4 in (1.93 m) | 205 lb (93 kg) | So | (Georgia (U.S. state)) Snellville |
| 9 | INF | Ryder Woodson | R/R | 6 ft 3 in (1.91 m) | 190 lb (86 kg) | So | (Florida) Naples |
| 10 | INF | Drew Wyers | R/R | 6 ft 2 in (1.88 m) | 200 lb (91 kg) | Sr | (New Jersey) Columbus |
| 11 | RHP | Duke Stone | L/R | 6 ft 5 in (1.96 m) | 235 lb (107 kg) | So | (Georgia (U.S. state)) Uvalda |
| 12 | UTL | Chone James | R/R | 6 ft 0 in (1.83 m) | 185 lb (84 kg) | So | (South Carolina) Myrtle Beach |
| 13 | LHP | William Kirk | L/L | 6 ft 2 in (1.88 m) | 205 lb (93 kg) | RS Fr | (New Jersey) Saddle River |
| 14 | OF | Vytas Valincius | R/R | 6 ft 4 in (1.93 m) | 230 lb (104 kg) | Gr | (Illinois) Lockport |
| 15 | UTL | Tanner Beliveau | R/R | 6 ft 3 in (1.91 m) | 225 lb (102 kg) | Fr | (Mississippi) Petal |
| 16 | RHP | Braden Booth | R/R | 6 ft 2 in (1.88 m) | 200 lb (91 kg) | RS Fr | (Alabama) Madison |
| 17 | RHP | Parker Rhodes | R/R | 6 ft 1 in (1.85 m) | 185 lb (84 kg) | Fr | (Indiana) Greenfield |
| 18 | UTL | Noah Sullivan | R/R | 6 ft 1 in (1.85 m) | 215 lb (98 kg) | Gr | (Florida) Orlando |
| 19 | C | Andrew Raymond | L/R | 6 ft 1 in (1.85 m) | 205 lb (93 kg) | So | (Maryland) Middletown |
| 20 | LHP | Maddox Miller | L/L | 6 ft 4 in (1.93 m) | 185 lb (84 kg) | Fr | (Mississippi) Hattiesburg |
| 21 | C | Robert Fortenberry | R/R | 6 ft 5 in (1.96 m) | 235 lb (107 kg) | Jr | (Connecticut) Wallingford |
| 22 | INF | Nick Frontino | R/R | 6 ft 3 in (1.91 m) | 205 lb (93 kg) | Fr | (Florida) Bonita Springs |
| 23 | C | Jackson Owen | R/R | 5 ft 10 in (1.78 m) | 200 lb (91 kg) | Gr | (Mississippi) Starkville |
| 24 | LHP | Jack Bauer | L/L | 6 ft 4 in (1.93 m) | 195 lb (88 kg) | Fr | (Illinois) Frankfort |
| 25 | RHP | Chris Billingsley Jr. | R/R | 6 ft 4 in (1.93 m) | 205 lb (93 kg) | Jr | (Alabama) Brent |
| 27 | UTL | Peter Mershon | R/R | 6 ft 2 in (1.88 m) | 205 lb (93 kg) | Fr | (South Carolina) Taylors |
| 28 | RHP | Ryan McPherson | R/R | 6 ft 3 in (1.91 m) | 205 lb (93 kg) | So | (Florida) Hollywood |
| 29 | RHP | Maddox Webb | R/R | 6 ft 2 in (1.88 m) | 195 lb (88 kg) | Jr | (South Carolina) Summerville |
| 30 | RHP | Jackson Logar | R/R | 6 ft 0 in (1.83 m) | 215 lb (98 kg) | Jr | (New Jersey) Medford |
| 31 | UTL | Charlie Wortham | R/R | 6 ft 1 in (1.85 m) | 205 lb (93 kg) | Fr | (Missouri) St. Peters |
| 32 | RHP | Peyton Fowler | R/R | 6 ft 3 in (1.91 m) | 195 lb (88 kg) | Jr | (Mississippi) Gluckstadt |
| 33 | UTL | Blake Bevis | R/R | 6 ft 4 in (1.93 m) | 230 lb (104 kg) | Sr | (Tennessee) Brentwood |
| 34 | UTL | Gehrig Frei | S/R | 6 ft 1 in (1.85 m) | 210 lb (95 kg) | Gr | (Georgia (U.S. state)) Alpharetta |
| 35 | RHP | Ben Davis | R/R | 6 ft 4 in (1.93 m) | 230 lb (104 kg) | Sr | (Mississippi) Booneville |
| 36 | RHP | Tyler Pitzer | L/R | 6 ft 3 in (1.91 m) | 205 lb (93 kg) | Jr | (Pennsylvania) McDonald |
| 37 | RHP | Brendan Sweeney | R/R | 6 ft 7 in (2.01 m) | 210 lb (95 kg) | Sr | (Oklahoma) Edmond |
| 38 | OF | Bryce Chance | R/R | 5 ft 10 in (1.78 m) | 180 lb (82 kg) | Gr | (Mississippi) Ridgeland |
| 39 | RHP | Patrick Spencer Jr. | R/R | 6 ft 3 in (1.91 m) | 215 lb (98 kg) | RS So | (Mississippi) Greenville |
| 42 | RHP | Jack Gleason | R/R | 6 ft 1 in (1.85 m) | 200 lb (91 kg) | RS Fr | (Tennessee) Germantown |
| 45 | LHP | Dane Burns | R/L | 6 ft 5 in (1.96 m) | 215 lb (98 kg) | So | (Saskatchewan) Regina |
| 47 | RHP | JT Schnoor | R/R | 6 ft 4 in (1.93 m) | 225 lb (102 kg) | RS Jr | (Mississippi) Pascagoula |
| 49 | INF | Gatlin Sanders | L/R | 5 ft 11 in (1.8 m) | 185 lb (84 kg) | Sr | (Mississippi) Madison |

Head coach

Brian O'Connor

Assistant coach(es)

Kevin McMullan
Matt Kirby
Justin Parker

Legend

- (C) Team captain
- (S) Suspended
- (I) Ineligible
- Injured
- Current redshirt

Roster
Last update: February 16, 2026

== Offseason ==
=== 2025 MLB draft ===
Several Mississippi State players from the previous 2025 Mississippi State Bulldogs baseball season were selected in the 2025 MLB draft and departed the team ahead of the 2026 regular season.

| Round | Overall pick | Player | Position | MLB Team | Source |
|---|---|---|---|---|---|
| 4 | 134 | Pico Kohn | Pitcher | New York Yankees | |
| 8 | 235 | Evan Siary | Pitcher | Texas Rangers | |
| 9 | 262 | Karson Ligon | Pitcher | Toronto Blue Jays | |
| 10 | 291 | Hunter Hines | First baseman | Washington Nationals | |
| 11 | 333 | Luke Dotson | Pitcher | Arizona Diamondbacks | |
| 13 | 391 | Nate Williams | Pitcher | Chicago Cubs | |
| 15 | 461 | Jacob Pruitt | Pitcher | Philadelphia Phillies | |

== Schedule and results ==
2026 Mississippi State Bulldogs baseball game log
(Overall: 43–19; Conference: 16–14); (Home: 28–8; Away: 10–9; Neutral: 5–2)
Regular season (39–16)

February (11–0)
| Date | Opponent | Rank | Site/stadium | Score | Win | Loss | Save | TV | Attendance | Overall record | SEC record |
|---|---|---|---|---|---|---|---|---|---|---|---|
| February 13 | Hofstra | No. 4 | Dudy Noble Field • Starkville, MS | **W** 6–5 | Duke Stone (1–0) | Carlos Martinez (0–1) | **Ben Davis (1)** | SECN+ | 12,824 | 1–0 | – |
| February 14 | Hofstra (DH-1) | No. 4 | Dudy Noble Field • Starkville, MS | **W** 6–1 | Tomas Valincius (1–0) | Sean Hamilton (0–1) | **Brendan Sweeney (1)** | SECN+ | 12,667 | 2–0 | – |
| February 14 | Hofstra (DH-2) | No. 4 | Dudy Noble Field • Starkville, MS | **W** 7–5 | Jack Gleason (1–0) | Tanner Sanderoff (0–1) | **Maddox Webb (1)** | SECN+ | 12,667 | 3–0 | – |
| February 15 | Hofstra | No. 4 | Dudy Noble Field • Starkville, MS | | moved to February 14, impending weather | | | | | | |
| February 17 | Troy | No. 4 | Dudy Noble Field • Starkville, MS | **W** 13–7 | William Kirk (1–0) | Blake Dean (0–1) | – | SECN+ | 9,842 | 4–0 | – |
| February 18 | Alcorn State | No. 4 | Dudy Noble Field • Starkville, MS | **W** 19–0^{7} | Maddox Miller (1–0) | Caden Wade (0–1) | – | SECN+ | 9,752 | 5–0 | – |
| February 20 | Delaware | No. 4 | Dudy Noble Field • Starkville, MS | **W** 9–2 | Ryan McPherson (1–0) | Brady Blum (0–2) | – | SECN+ | 11,632 | 6–0 | – |
| February 21 | Delaware | No. 4 | Dudy Noble Field • Starkville, MS | **W** 10–0^{8} | Tomas Valincius (2–0) | Doug Marose (0–1) | – | SECN+ | 13,194 | 7–0 | – |
| February 22 | Delaware | No. 4 | Dudy Noble Field • Starkville, MS | **W** 7–3 | Duke Stone (2–0) | Ryan Pugh (0–1) | **Tyler Pitzer (1)** | SECN+ | 9,473 | 8–0 | – |
| February 24 | Austin Peay | No. 4 | Dudy Noble Field • Starkville, MS | **W** 16–3^{7} | Chris Billingsley (1–0) | Chance Cox (0–1) | – | SECN+ | 9,337 | 9–0 | – |
Amegy Bank College Baseball Series
| February 27 | vs. Arizona State | No. 4 | Globe Life Field • Arlington, TX | **W** 8–4 | Ryan McPherson (2–0) | Cole Carlon (2–1) | – | FloCollege | 7,181 | 10–0 | – |
| February 28 | vs. Virginia Tech | No. 4 | Globe Life Field • Arlington, TX | **W** 15–8 | Tomas Valincius (3–0) | Griffin Stieg (0–1) | – | FloCollege | 13,097 | 11–0 | – |

March (14–4)
| Date | Opponent | Rank | Site/stadium | Score | Win | Loss | Save | TV | Attendance | Overall record | SEC record |
|---|---|---|---|---|---|---|---|---|---|---|---|
| March 1 | vs. No. 1 UCLA | No. 4 | Globe Life Field • Arlington, TX | **L** 7–8^{10} | Easton Hawk (1–1) | **Ben Davis (0–1)** | – | FloCollege | 8,903 | 11–1 | – |
| March 3 | at No. 10 Southern Miss | No. 4 | Pete Taylor Park • Hattiesburg, MS | **L** 6–7 | Josh Och (3–0) | **Maddox Miller (1–1)** | Camden Clark (4) | ESPN+ | 5,716 | 11–2 | – |
| March 5 ^{[1]} | Lipscomb | No. 4 | Dudy Noble Field • Starkville, MS | **W** 8–3 | **Ryan McPherson (3–0)** | Alexander Llinas (0–2) | **Ben Davis (2)** | SECN+ | 10,057 | 12–2 | – |
| March 6 ^{[1]} | Lipscomb | No. 4 | Dudy Noble Field • Starkville, MS | **W** 9–4 | **Tyler Pitzer (1–0)** | Collin Bosley-Smith (0–1) | – | SECN+ | 11,499 | 13–2 | – |
| March 7 ^{[1]} | Lipscomb | No. 4 | Dudy Noble Field • Starkville, MS | **W** 26–0^{7} | **Duke Stone (3–0)** | Jackson Lee (1–1) | – | SECN+ | 10,375 | 14–2 | – |
Hancock Whitney Classic
| March 10 | vs. Tulane | No. 3 | Keesler Federal Park • Biloxi, MS | **W** 11–7 | **Dane Burns (1–0)** | Tom Vincent (1–1) | – | SECN+ | 6,112 | 15–2 | – |
| March 13 | at No. 5 Arkansas | No. 3 | Baum–Walker Stadium • Fayetteville, AR | **L** 4–5 | Cole Gibler (2–0) | **Maddox Miller (1–2)** | – | SECN+ | 10,464 | 15–3 | 0–1 |
| March 14 | at No. 5 Arkansas (DH-1) | No. 3 | Baum–Walker Stadium • Fayetteville, AR | **W** 7–2 | **Tomas Valincius (4–0)** | Hunter Dietz (2–2) | – | SECN | 10,790 | 16–3 | 1–1 |
| March 14 | at No. 5 Arkansas (DH-2) | No. 3 | Baum–Walker Stadium • Fayetteville, AR | **L** 3–7 | Ethan McElvain (3–0) | **Tyler Pitzer (1–1)** | – | SECN+ | 9,653 | 16–4 | 1–2 |
| March 15 | at No. 5 Arkansas | No. 3 | Baum–Walker Stadium • Fayetteville, AR | **moved to March 14, impending weather** | | | | | | | |
| March 17 | Jackson State | No. 6 | Dudy Noble Field • Starkville, MS | **W** 17–1^{7} | **Parker Rhodes (1–0)** | Jo Williams (0–2) | – | SECN+ | 7,967 | 17–4 | – |
| March 20 | Vanderbilt | No. 6 | Dudy Noble Field • Starkville, MS | **W** 4–2 | **Jack Gleason (2–0)** | Connor Fennell (2–1) | **Ben Davis (3)** | SECN | 14,649 | 18–4 | 2–2 |
| March 21 | Vanderbilt | No. 6 | Dudy Noble Field • Starkville, MS | **W** 7–2 | **Tomas Valincius (5–0)** | Wyatt Nadeau (1–1) | – | SECN+ | 14,834 | 19–4 | 3–2 |
| March 22 | Vanderbilt | No. 6 | Dudy Noble Field • Starkville, MS | **W** 17–7^{7} | **Duke Stone (4–0)** | Tyler Baird (0–1) | – | SECN+ | 12,207 | 20–4 | 4–2 |
| March 24 | No. 11 Southern Miss | No. 6 | Dudy Noble Field • Starkville, MS | **W** 12–0^{7} | **Jack Bauer (1–0)** | Thomas Crabtree (0–2) | – | SECN+ | 12,887 | 21–4 | – |
| March 27 | at No. 18 Ole Miss | No. 6 | Swayze Field • Oxford, MS | **W** 5–4 | **Tyler Pitzer (2–1)** | Taylor Rabe (3–1) | – | SECN+ | 11,758 | 22–4 | 5–2 |
| March 28 | at No. 18 Ole Miss | No. 6 | Swayze Field • Oxford, MS | **W** 6–1 | **Tomas Valincius (6–0)** | Hudson Calhoun (1–2) | – | SECN+ | 11,336 | 23–4 | 6–2 |
| March 29 | at No. 18 Ole Miss | No. 6 | Swayze Field • Oxford, MS | **W** 7–1 | **Duke Stone (5–0)** | Cade Townsend (2–1) | – | SECN | 9,408 | 24–4 | 7–2 |
| March 31 | Grambling State | No. 4 | Dudy Noble Field • Starkville, MS | **W** 12–0^{7} | **Jack Bauer (2–0)** | Trevor Esparza (1–2) | – | SECN+ | 9,473 | 25–4 | – |

April (10–6)
| Date | Opponent | Rank | Site/stadium | Score | Win | Loss | Save | TV | Attendance | Overall record | SEC record |
|---|---|---|---|---|---|---|---|---|---|---|---|
| April 2 | No. 5 Georgia | No. 4 | Dudy Noble Field • Starkville, MS | **L** 9–10 | Joey Volchko (6–0) | **Charlie Foster (0–1)** | Caden Aoki (3) | SECN+ | 12,828 | 25–5 | 7–3 |
| April 3 | No. 5 Georgia | No. 4 | Dudy Noble Field • Starkville, MS | **L** 1–3 | Paul Farley (3–0) | **Tomas Valincius (6–1)** | Matt Scott (1) | SECN+ | 14,348 | 25–6 | 7–4 |
| April 4 | No. 5 Georgia | No. 4 | Dudy Noble Field • Starkville, MS | **L** 5–8^{10} | Caden Aoki (3–0) | **Maddox Webb (0–1)** | – | SECN+ | 10,256 | 25–7 | 7–5 |
| April 7 | UAB | No. 9 | Dudy Noble Field • Starkville, MS | **W** 5–3 | **Jack Gleason (3–0)** | Justin Hicks (2–2) | **Ben Davis (4)** | SECN+ | 9,329 | 26–7 | – |
| April 10 | Tennessee | No. 9 | Dudy Noble Field • Starkville, MS | **L** 5–6 | Cam Appenzeller (5–0) | **Tyler Pitzer (2–2)** | – | SECN+ | 13,543 | 26–8 | 7–6 |
| April 11 | Tennessee | No. 9 | Dudy Noble Field • Starkville, MS | **L** 2–6 | Tegan Kuhns (2–3) | **Duke Stone (5–1)** | Brandon Arvidson (1) | SECN+ | 14,814 | 26–9 | 7–7 |
| April 12 | Tennessee | No. 9 | Dudy Noble Field • Starkville, MS | **L** 2–7 | Evan Blanco (3–2) | **Charlie Foster (0–2)** | Bo Rhudy (2) | SECN+ | 10,376 | 26–10 | 7–8 |
| April 14 | at Samford | No. 17 | Joe Lee Griffin Stadium • Birmingham, AL | **W** 11–1^{7} | **Maddox Miller (2–2)** | Ryan Vermillion (1–1) | – | ESPN+ | 2,113 | 27–10 | – |
| April 17 | at South Carolina | No. 17 | Founders Park • Columbia, SC | **W** 5–3 | **Tomas Valincius (7–1)** | Brandon Stone (4–2) | **Ben Davis (5)** | SECN+ | 6,752 | 28–10 | 8–8 |
| April 18 | at South Carolina | No. 17 | Founders Park • Columbia, SC | **W** 9–0 | **Duke Stone (6–1)** | Amp Phillips (3–5) | – | SECN | 6,735 | 29–10 | 9–8 |
| April 19 | at South Carolina | No. 17 | Founders Park • Columbia, SC | **W** 4–3^{11} | **Maddox Webb (1–1)** | Zach Russell (3–1) | – | SECN+ | 6,459 | 30–10 | 10–8 |
| April 21 | Memphis | No. 15 | Dudy Noble Field • Starkville, MS | **W** 6–2 | **Maddox Miller (3–2)** | Isaac Lucas (0–2) | **Maddox Webb (2)** | SECN+ | 8,772 | 31–10 | – |
Super Bulldog Weekend
| April 24 | LSU | No. 15 | Dudy Noble Field • Starkville, MS | **W** 10–8^{11} | **Dane Burns (2–0)** | Zac Cowan (1–3) | – | SECN+ | 13,489 | 32–10 | 11–8 |
| April 25 | LSU | No. 15 | Dudy Noble Field • Starkville, MS | **W** 9–8 | **Jack Bauer (3–0)** | Grant Fontenot (0–1) | **Maddox Webb (3)** | ESPN2 | 15,289 | 33–10 | 12–8 |
| April 26 | LSU | No. 15 | Dudy Noble Field • Starkville, MS | **W** 13–8 | **Peyton Fowler (1–0)** | Deven Sheerin (3–1) | – | SECN+ | 12,379 | 34–10 | 13–8 |
| April 28 | vs. No. 17 Ole Miss; Governor's Cup | No. 10 | Trustmark Park • Pearl, MS | **W** 7–3 | **Maddox Miller (4–2)** | Owen Kelly (2–2) | **Dane Burns (1)** | SECN+ | 8,223 | 35–10 | – |

May (4–6)
| Date | Opponent | Rank | Site/stadium | Score | Win | Loss | Save | TV | Attendance | Overall record | SEC record |
|---|---|---|---|---|---|---|---|---|---|---|---|
| May 1 | at No. 4 Texas | No. 10 | UFCU Disch–Falk Field • Austin, TX | **L** 1–3 | Dylan Volantis (7–0) | **Tomas Valincius (7–2)** | Sam Cozart (7) | SECN+ | 6,747 | 35–11 | 13–9 |
| May 2 | at No. 4 Texas | No. 10 | UFCU Disch–Falk Field • Austin, TX | **W** 7–4 | **Jack Bauer (4–0)** | Brett Crossland (1–2) | – | SECN+ | 7,536 | 36–11 | 14–9 |
| May 3 | at No. 4 Texas | No. 10 | UFCU Disch–Falk Field • Austin, TX | **L** 6–11 | Luke Harrison (5–2) | **Jack Gleason (3–1)** | – | ESPN | 7,481 | 36–12 | 14–10 |
| May 5 | Nicholls | No. 11 | Dudy Noble Field • Starkville, MS | **W** 21–6^{7} | **Jack Gleason (4–1)** | Austin Vargas (0–3) | – | SECN+ | 8,042 | 37–12 | – |
| May 7 | No. 6 Auburn | No. 11 | Dudy Noble Field • Starkville, MS | **W** 10–3 | **Tomas Valincius (8–2)** | Jake Marciano (4–4) | – | ESPN2 | 12,658 | 38–12 | 15–10 |
| May 8 | No. 6 Auburn | No. 11 | Dudy Noble Field • Starkville, MS | **L** 4–5 | Jackson Sanders (4–1) | **Ben Davis (0–2)** | – | SECN | 13,772 | 38–13 | 15–11 |
| May 9 | No. 6 Auburn | No. 11 | Dudy Noble Field • Starkville, MS | **L** 2–13^{7} | Alex Petrovic (8–2) | **Ryan McPherson (3–1)** | – | SECN | 13,506 | 38–14 | 15–12 |
| May 14 | at No. 10 Texas A&M | No. 13 | Blue Bell Park • College Station, TX | **W** 18–11 | **Tomas Valincius (9–2)** | Ethan Darden (4–2) | – | SECN+ | 5,862 | 39–14 | 16–12 |
| May 15 | at No. 10 Texas A&M | No. 13 | Blue Bell Park • College Station, TX | **L** 9–11 | Shane Sdao (4–4) | **Duke Stone (6–2)** | Clayton Freshcorn (12) | SECN+ | 6,776 | 39–15 | 16–13 |
| May 16 | at No. 10 Texas A&M | No. 13 | Blue Bell Park • College Station, TX | **L** 6–7 | Clayton Freshcorn (3–2) | **Charlie Foster (0–3)** | – | SECN | 6,600 | 39–16 | 16–14 |

Postseason (4–3)

SEC Tournament (1–1)
| Date | Opponent | Seed/Rank | Site/stadium | Score | Win | Loss | Save | TV | Attendance | Overall record | SECT Record |
|---|---|---|---|---|---|---|---|---|---|---|---|
| May 20 | vs. (16) Missouri | (8) No. 16 | Hoover Metropolitan Stadium • Hoover, AL | **W** 12–2^{7} | **Tomas Valincius (10–2)** | Brady Kehlenbrink (3–10) | – | SECN | 8,352 | 40–16 | 1–0 |
| May 21 | vs. (1) No. 4 Georgia | (8) No. 16 | Hoover Metropolitan Stadium • Hoover, AL | **L** 3–5 | Joey Volchko (9–2) | **Duke Stone (6–3)** | Matt Scott (5) | SECN | 11,146 | 40–17 | 1–1 |

NCAA Starkville Regional (3–0)
| Date | Opponent | Seed/Rank | Site/stadium | Score | Win | Loss | Save | TV | Attendance | Overall record | NCAAT record |
|---|---|---|---|---|---|---|---|---|---|---|---|
| May 29 | (4) Lipscomb | (1) No. 17 | Dudy Noble Field • Starkville, MS | **W** 10–1 | **Duke Stone (7–3)** | Alexander Llinas (6–5) | – | ESPN+ | 10,470 | 41–17 | 1–0 |
| May 30 | (2) No. 24 Cincinnati | (1) No. 17 | Dudy Noble Field • Starkville, MS | **W** 10–5 | **Tomas Valincius (11–2)** | Adam Buczkowski (4–2) | – | SECN | 11,588 | 42–17 | 2–0 |
| May 31 | (3) No. 25 Louisiana | (1) No. 17 | Dudy Noble Field • Starkville, MS | **W** 19–5 | **Ryan McPherson (4–1)** | Sawyer Pruitt (7–5) | – | SECN | 9,901 | 43–17 | 3–0 |

NCAA Athens Super Regional (0–2)
| Date | Opponent | Seed/Rank | Site/stadium | Score | Win | Loss | Save | TV | Attendance | Overall record | NCAAT record |
|---|---|---|---|---|---|---|---|---|---|---|---|
| June 6 | at (3) No. 3 Georgia | (14) No. 17 | Foley Field • Athens, GA | **L** 12–13 | Grant Edwards (1–1) | **Dane Burns (2–1)** | Justin Byrd (8) | ESPN | 3,633 | 43–18 | 3–1 |
| June 7 | at (3) No. 3 Georgia | (14) No. 17 | Foley Field • Athens, GA | **L** 9–11^{10} | Justin Byrd (5–2) | **Tyler Pitzer (2–3)** | – | ESPN | 3,633 | 43–19 | 3–2 |

Legend: = Win = Loss = Canceled
Bold = Mississippi State team member
Rankings are based on the team's current ranking in the D1Baseball poll.

1.^{1} ^{2} ^{3} Three game series with Lipscomb was originally scheduled 3/6-8 was pushed up 1 day due to impending weather.

== Record vs. conference opponents ==
Blank are not scheduled. Blue are home games, otherwise away.

2026 SEC baseball records Source: 2026 SEC baseball game results, 2026 SEC baseball schedule
| Tm | W–L | ALA | ARK | AUB | FLA | UGA | KEN | LSU | MSU | MIZ | OKL | OMS | SCA | TEN | TEX | TAM | VAN | Tm | SR | SW |
|---|---|---|---|---|---|---|---|---|---|---|---|---|---|---|---|---|---|---|---|---|
| ALA | 18–12 | | 0–3 | 3–0 | 3–0 | . | 0–3 | . | . | . | 2–1 | 2–1 | 3–0 | 1–2 | 1–2 | . | 3–0 | ALA | 6–4 | 4–2 |
| ARK | 17–13 | 3–0 | | 1–2 | 0–3 | 1–2 | 2–1 | . | 2–1 | 2–1 | 2–1 | 2–1 | 2–1 | . | . | . | . | ARK | 7–3 | 1–1 |
| AUB | 17–13 | 0–3 | 2–1 | | 2–1 | 1–2 | 2–1 | . | 2–1 | 3–0 | 2–1 | . | . | . | 1–2 | 2–1 | . | AUB | 7–3 | 1–1 |
| FLA | 18–12 | 0–3 | 3–0 | 1–2 | | 2–1 | 2–1 | 3–0 | . | . | 2–1 | 1–2 | 3–0 | . | . | 1–2 | . | FLA | 6–4 | 3–1 |
| UGA | 23–7 | . | 2–1 | 2–1 | 1–2 | | . | 3–0 | 3–0 | 3–0 | . | 2–1 | 3–0 | 2–1 | . | 2–1 | . | UGA | 9–1 | 4–0 |
| KEN | 13–17 | 3–0 | 1–2 | 1–2 | 1–2 | . | | 1–2 | . | 1–2 | . | 1–2 | 1–2 | 2–1 | . | . | 1–2 | KEN | 2–8 | 1–0 |
| LSU | 9–21 | . | . | . | 0–3 | 0–3 | 2–1 | | 0–3 | . | 1–2 | 0–3 | 3–0 | 2–1 | . | 0–3 | 1–2 | LSU | 3–7 | 1–5 |
| MSU | 16–14 | . | 1–2 | 1–2 | . | 0–3 | . | 3–0 | | . | . | 3–0 | 3–0 | 0–3 | 1–2 | 1–2 | 3–0 | MSU | 4–6 | 4–2 |
| MIZ | 6–24 | . | 1–2 | 0–3 | . | 0–3 | 2–1 | . | . | | 0–3 | . | 0–3 | 1–2 | 0–3 | 0–3 | 2–1 | MIZ | 2–8 | 0–6 |
| OKL | 14–16 | 1–2 | 1–2 | 1–2 | 1–2 | . | . | 2–1 | . | 3–0 | | . | . | 1–2 | 0–3 | 2–1 | 2–1 | OKL | 4–6 | 1–1 |
| OMS | 15–15 | 1–2 | 1–2 | . | 2–1 | 1–2 | 2–1 | 3–0 | 0–3 | . | . | | . | 2–1 | 1–2 | 2–1 | . | OMS | 5–5 | 1–1 |
| SCA | 7–23 | 0–3 | 1–2 | . | 0–3 | 0–3 | 2–1 | 0–3 | 0–3 | 3–0 | . | . | | . | 1–2 | . | 0–3 | SCA | 2–8 | 1–6 |
| TEN | 15–15 | 2–1 | . | . | . | 1–2 | 1–2 | 1–2 | 3–0 | 2–1 | 2–1 | 1–2 | . | | 2–1 | . | 0–3 | TEN | 5–5 | 1–1 |
| TEX | 19–10 | 2–1 | . | 2–1 | . | . | . | . | 2–1 | 3–0 | 3–0 | 2–1 | 2–1 | 1–2 | | 0–2 | 2–1 | TEX | 8–2 | 2–0 |
| TAM | 18–11 | . | . | 1–2 | 2–1 | 1–2 | . | 3–0 | 2–1 | 3–0 | 1–2 | 1–2 | . | . | 2–0 | | 2–1 | TAM | 6–4 | 2–0 |
| VAN | 14–16 | 0–3 | . | . | . | . | 2–1 | 2–1 | 0–3 | 1–2 | 1–2 | . | 3–0 | 3–0 | 1–2 | 1–2 | | VAN | 4–6 | 2–2 |
| Tm | W–L | ALA | ARK | AUB | FLA | UGA | KEN | LSU | MSU | MIZ | OKL | OMS | SCA | TEN | TEX | TAM | VAN | Team | SR | SW |

Updated for entire regular season. Texas at Texas A&M, one game cancelled.
Tie breakers: ALA>FLA hd to hd, AUB>ARK hd to hd, OMS>TEN hd to hd, OKL>VAN hd to hd.

== Rankings ==
Ranking movements Legend: ██ Increase in ranking ██ Decrease in ranking ( ) = First-place votes
| | Week | | | | | | | | | | | | | | | | | |
| Poll | Pre | 1 | 2 | 3 | 4 | 5 | 6 | 7 | 8 | 9 | 10 | 11 | 12 | 13 | 14 | 15 | 16 | Final |
|---|---|---|---|---|---|---|---|---|---|---|---|---|---|---|---|---|---|---|
| Coaches' | 6 | 6* | 5 (1) | 4 | 3 | 6 | 4 | 4 | 8 | 16 | 11 | 9 | 11 | 12 | 14 | 17 | 17* | 13 |
| Baseball America | 3 | 3 | 3 | 3 | 2 | 8 | 8 | 5 | 9 | 17 | 13 | 10 | 10 | 12 | 16 | 16* | 16* | 9 |
| NCBWA† | 6 | 5 | 5 | 5 | 3 | 6 | 4 | 4 | 8 | 15 | 13 | 9 | 11 | 13 | 16 | 16* | 7 | 10 |
| D1Baseball | 4 | 4 | 4 | 4 | 3 | 6 | 6 | 4 | 9 | 17 | 15 | 10 | 11 | 13 | 16 | 17 | 17* | 14 |
| Perfect Game | 6 | 6 | 5 | 4 | 4 | 7 | 6 | 4 | 8 | 15 | 12 | 9 | 12 | 15 | 18 | 18* | 18* | 11 |

† NCBWA ranks 30 teams in their preseason poll, but only ranks 25 teams weekly during the season.
* A new poll was not released for this week, so for comparison purposes, the previous week's ranking is inserted in this week's slot.
