= 2026 Ole Miss Rebels baseball team =

2026 season of University of Mississippi baseball team

2026 Ole Miss Rebels baseball

NCAA Lincoln Regional Champions NCAA Auburn Super Regional Champions

College World Series, 0–2
- Conference: Southeastern Conference

Ranking
- Coaches: No. 7
- D1Baseball.com: No. 7
- Record: 41–23 (15–15 SEC)
- Head coach: Mike Bianco (26th season)
- Assistant coaches: Mike Clement (12th season); Carl Lafferty (20th season); Joel Mangrum (2nd season)
- Home stadium: Swayze Field

2026 Southeastern Conference baseball standings
	Conf.				Overall
Team	W		L	PCT	W		L	PCT
No. 3 Georgia ‍†‍‡‍^{y}	23	–	7	.767	53	–	14	.791
No. 5 Texas ‍‍‍^{y}	19	–	10	.655	46	–	15	.754
No. 17 Texas A&M ‍‍‍^{y}	18	–	11	.621	41	–	16	.719
No. 6 Alabama ‍‍‍^{y}	18	–	12	.600	42	–	21	.667
No. 16 Florida ‍‍‍^{y}	18	–	12	.600	41	–	21	.661
No. 9 Auburn ‍‍‍^{y}	17	–	13	.567	42	–	22	.656
No. 23 Arkansas ‍‍‍^{y}	17	–	13	.567	41	–	22	.651
No. 14 Mississippi State ‍‍‍^{y}	16	–	14	.533	43	–	19	.694
No. 7 Ole Miss ‍‍‍^{y}	15	–	15	.500	41	–	23	.641
Tennessee ‍‍‍^{y}	15	–	15	.500	38	–	22	.633
No. 1 Oklahoma ‍‍‍^{y}	14	–	16	.467	43	–	23	.652
Vanderbilt ‍‍‍	14	–	16	.467	33	–	25	.569
Kentucky ‍‍‍^{y}	13	–	17	.433	33	–	23	.589
LSU ‍‍‍	9	–	21	.300	30	–	28	.517
South Carolina ‍‍‍	7	–	23	.233	22	–	35	.386
Missouri ‍‍‍	6	–	24	.200	24	–	31	.436
† – Conference champion ‡ – Tournament champion y – Invited to the NCAA Tournament; As of June 22, 2026; Rankings from D1Baseball

The 2026 Ole Miss Rebels baseball team represented the University of Mississippi during the 2026 NCAA Division I baseball season. Led by head coach Mike Bianco in his 26th season, the Rebels played their home games at Swayze Field in Oxford, Mississippi. The Rebels were members of the Southeastern Conference (SEC).

== Previous season ==
During the 2025 season, the Rebels finished 43–21, including a 16–14 record in Southeastern Conference play. The team advanced to the finals of the 2025 Southeastern Conference baseball tournament before losing to Vanderbilt. The Rebels also hosted a regional as part of the 2025 NCAA Division I baseball tournament, but were defeated by fourth-seeded Murray State in the regional final.

== Preseason ==
=== Departures ===
==== Graduates ====
Outfielders Isaac Humphrey, Ryan Moerman, and Mitchell Sanford, infielder Luke Cheng, and right-handed pitchers Riley Maddox, Mason Nichols, Alex Canney, and Connor Spencer all graduated from the program following the 2025 season.

==== Transfer portal ====
Eight Rebels from the 2025 roster entered the NCAA transfer portal following the season. The portal was open from June 1 to July 1, 2025. On June 11, catcher Campbell Smithwick entered the portal, committing to Oklahoma State on June 25. On June 13, LHP Ryne Rodriguez entered the portal, committing to Houston. Infielder Ethan Surowiec officially entered the portal on July 5, but had filed a request prior to the July 1 deadline. The day after Surowiec entered the portal, he committed to Florida. Other transfers include outfielder Tyler Acevedo to Iona, outfielder Connor Chisolm to Murray State, outfielder Hudson Mattox to Nicholls, and outfielder Jackson Miller to Wake Forest. RHP Cole Ketchum also entered the portal, but did not commit to another team.

==== MLB draft ====
The 2025 Major League Baseball draft took place on July 13–14, 2025. A total of eleven Rebels were selected, the most in a single draft since 2014. All signed with their respective MLB teams.

Player	Round	Pick	Team	Position
Mason Morris	3	83	Cincinnati Reds	RHP
Luke Hill	4	132	Cleveland Guardians	IF
Coy James	5	142	Washington Nationals	IF
Grant Richardson	6	170	Athletics	LHP
Will McCausland	7	222	Cleveland Guardians	RHP
Riley Maddox	8	231	Washington Nationals	RHP
Mason Nichols	9	267	Tampa Bay Rays	RHP
Connor Spencer	12	361	Chicago Cubs	RHP
Patrick Galle	17	508	Boston Red Sox	RHP
Brayden Jones	18	537	Tampa Bay Rays	RHP
Sam Tookoian	20	589	Boston Red Sox	RHP

=== Arrivals ===
==== High school recruiting ====
With nine high school commits, the Rebels ranked 38th in Perfect Game's Class of 2025 recruiting rankings. Cannon Goldin, an outfielder out of Buford High School (Georgia), ranked as the 151st best recruit in the country by Perfect Game, and was the highest-rated Ole Miss incoming recruit. Blake Ilitch, a RHP out of Brother Rice High School (Michigan), ranked 174th. Outfielder Bryden Bull from Las Vegas High School (Nevada), came in as the 187th-best recruit. Other recruits included RHP Noah Allen of North Oconee High School (GA) RHP Leo Odom of Sumrall High School (Mississippi), Luke Romine of Hernando High School (Mississippi), RHP Evan Farrow of Vandegrift High School (Texas), LHP Grayson Gibson of Calvary Christian Academy (Florida), and catcher Kelven Perera of Miami Springs Senior High School (Florida).

Infielder Coy James, out of Davie County High School (North Carolina), also committed to Ole Miss, but was selected in the fifth round by the Washington Nationals, who he signed with. James was the fifteenth-ranked Class of 2025 recruit by Perfect Game and was the 2025 Gatorade North Carolina Baseball Player of the Year.

Incoming recruits
Name	Pos.	Height	Weight	Hometown	High school
Noah Allen	RHP	6 ft 7 in (2.01 m)	205 lb (93 kg)	Watkinsville, Georgia	North Oconee High School (Georgia)
Bryden Bull	INF	6 ft 5 in (1.96 m)	200 lb (91 kg)	Las Vegas, Nevada	Las Vegas High School (Nevada)
Evan Farrow	RHP	6 ft 5 in (1.96 m)	205 lb (93 kg)	Austin, Texas	Vandegrift High School (Texas)
Grayson Gibson	LHP	6 ft 1 in (1.85 m)	210 lb (95 kg)	Tampa, Florida	Calvary Christian Academy (Florida)
Cannon Goldin	OF	6 ft 0 in (1.83 m)	185 lb (84 kg)	Buford, Georgia	Buford High School (Georgia)
Blake Ilitch	RHP	6 ft 4 in (1.93 m)	220 lb (100 kg)	Detroit, Michigan	Brother Rice High School (Michigan)
Leo Odom	RHP	6 ft 2 in (1.88 m)	200 lb (91 kg)	Sumrall, Mississippi	Sumrall High School (Mississippi)
Kelven Perera	C	6 ft 1 in (1.85 m)	225 lb (102 kg)	Miami, Florida	Miami Springs Senior High School (Florida)
Luke Romine	INF	6 ft 1 in (1.85 m)	220 lb (100 kg)	Hernando, Mississippi	Hernando High School (Mississippi)

==== Transfer portal ====
Nine players transferred to the Rebels. On June 12, LHP Grant Richardson, a senior from Grand Canyon, committed to the Rebels, marking the first transfer for the team this year. Richardson previously missed all of the 2025 season recovering from Tommy John surgery. Two senior outfielders transferred in on June 14: Tristan Bissetta from Clemson, and Daniel Pacella from Illinois State. The following day, sophomore LHP Wil Libbert of Missouri committed to Ole Miss. Senior San Diego State RHP Marko Sipila committed to the team on June 21. Two more junior right-handed pitchers committed on June 23: Landon Koenig, a North Dakota State starter, and Owen Kelly, who previously played for Saint Louis. Kelly was an All-Atlantic 10 Conference second-team selection during the 2025 season. Dom Decker, a junior outfielder from the Murray State team that eliminated the Rebels from the playoffs last season, committed to the Rebels on June 29. On July 6, former Mississippi State signee Topher Jones, a sophomore infielder from Pearl River Community College, committed to the Rebels, marking the final transfer in for the team, and the only from a junior college.

Richardson was selected by the Athletics in the sixth round of the 2025 MLB Draft. On July 23, 2025, Richardson signed with the Athletics, meaning he no longer would play for the Rebels.

Incoming transfers
Name	Pos.	Height	Weight	Hometown	Year	Previous school
Tristan Bissetta	OF	6 ft 1 in (1.85 m)	225 lb (102 kg)	Greenville, South Carolina	Sr	Clemson
Dom Decker	INF	6 ft 0 in (1.83 m)	190 lb (86 kg)	Sellersburg, Indiana	Jr	Murray State
Topher Jones	INF	6 ft 1 in (1.85 m)	215 lb (98 kg)	Hernando, Mississippi	So	Pearl River Community College
Owen Kelly	RHP	6 ft 4 in (1.93 m)	220 lb (100 kg)	Belleville, Illinois	Jr	Saint Louis
Landon Koenig	RHP	6 ft 6 in (1.98 m)	245 lb (111 kg)	Page, North Dakota	Jr	North Dakota State
Wil Libbert	LHP	6 ft 1 in (1.85 m)	215 lb (98 kg)	St. Thomas, Missouri	So	Missouri
Daniel Pacella	OF	6 ft 4 in (1.93 m)	225 lb (102 kg)	Mundelein, Illinois	Sr	Illinois State
Marko Sipila	RHP	6 ft 4 in (1.93 m)	220 lb (100 kg)	Orono, Minnesota	Sr	San Diego State

=== Polling and awards ===
The Southeastern Conference revealed its 2026 preseason coaches poll and its preseason All-SEC teams on February 5, 2026. In the preseason poll, as voted on by the 16 SEC baseball head coaches, Ole Miss was predicted to finish 10th in the conference. Two Rebels made preseason All-SEC teams: starting pitcher Hunter Elliott was a first-team selection, while first baseman Will Furniss was a second-team selection. Elliott was also named a third-team preseason All-American selection by Perfect Game on January 7, 2026, and a first-team preseason All-American selection by D1Baseball on January 20, 2026.

SEC Baseball Preseason Coaches Poll
Predicted finish	Team	Votes (First place)
1	LSU	231 (9)
2	Texas	214 (1)
3	Mississippi State	205 (4)
4	Arkansas	203 (2)
5	Auburn	175
6	Tennessee	162
7	Florida	156
8	Vanderbilt	151
9	Georgia	133
10	Ole Miss	110
11	Kentucky	99
12	Alabama	87
13	Texas A&M	86
14	Oklahoma	84
15	South Carolina	49
16	Missouri	31

== Roster ==
2026 Ole Miss Rebels baseball team
Players
Coaches

#	Pos.	Name	B/T	Height	Weight	Year	Home town
1	INF	Brayden Randle	L/R	5 ft 9 in (1.75 m)	175 lb (79 kg)	Jr	Rockwall, Texas
2	OF	Brett Moseley (redshirt)	L/R	6 ft 3 in (1.91 m)	195 lb (88 kg)	Fr	Trussville, Alabama
3	INF	Bryden Bull	L/L	6 ft 5 in (1.96 m)	200 lb (91 kg)	Fr	Las Vegas, Nevada
4	OF	Cannon Goldin	L/L	6 ft 0 in (1.83 m)	185 lb (84 kg)	Fr	Buford, Georgia
6	INF	Owen Paino	L/R	6 ft 3 in (1.91 m)	225 lb (102 kg)	So	Poughkeepsie, New York
7	INF	Topher Jones	R/R	6 ft 1 in (1.85 m)	215 lb (98 kg)	So	Hernando, Mississippi
8	UTL	Tate Sirmans (redshirt)	R/R	6 ft 2 in (1.88 m)	190 lb (86 kg)	Fr	Valdosta, Georgia
9	OF	Hayden Federico	S/R	5 ft 11 in (1.8 m)	195 lb (88 kg)	So	West Monroe, Louisiana
10	RHP	Cade Townsend	R/R	6 ft 1 in (1.85 m)	185 lb (84 kg)	So	Aliso Viejo, California
12	INF	Dom Decker	L/R	6 ft 0 in (1.83 m)	190 lb (86 kg)	Jr	Sellersburg, Indiana
14	LHP	Cooper Johnson	L/L	6 ft 4 in (1.93 m)	220 lb (100 kg)	So	Jefferson, Georgia
16	C	Kelven Perera	R/R	6 ft 1 in (1.85 m)	225 lb (102 kg)	Fr	Miami, Florida
17	RHP	Marko Sipila	R/R	6 ft 4 in (1.93 m)	220 lb (100 kg)	Sr	Orono, Minnesota
18	INF	Luke Romine	L/L	6 ft 1 in (1.85 m)	220 lb (100 kg)	Fr	Hernando, Mississippi
19	LHP	Walker Hooks	L/L	6 ft 4 in (1.93 m)	265 lb (120 kg)	So	Brandon, Mississippi
20	C	Collin Reuter	R/R	6 ft 2 in (1.88 m)	235 lb (107 kg)	Sr	Olive Branch, Mississippi
21	RHP	Owen Kelly	R/R	6 ft 4 in (1.93 m)	220 lb (100 kg)	Jr	Belleville, Illinois
22	LHP	Patrick Collopy	R/L	6 ft 5 in (1.96 m)	230 lb (104 kg)	Jr	Austin, Texas
23	RHP	Hudson Calhoun	R/R	6 ft 4 in (1.93 m)	210 lb (95 kg)	Jr	Tupelo, Mississippi
24	C	Austin Fawley	R/R	6 ft 1 in (1.85 m)	205 lb (93 kg)	Jr	West Palm Beach, Florida
25	OF	Daniel Pacella	L/L	6 ft 4 in (1.93 m)	225 lb (102 kg)	Sr	Mundelein, Illinois
26	LHP	Hunter Elliott	L/L	6 ft 3 in (1.91 m)	215 lb (98 kg)	Jr	Tupelo, Mississippi
27	INF	Judd Utermark	R/R	6 ft 5 in (1.96 m)	250 lb (113 kg)	Sr	Charlotte, North Carolina
28	RHP	Noah Allen	R/R	6 ft 7 in (2.01 m)	205 lb (93 kg)	Fr	Watkinsville, Georgia
29	LHP	Grayson Gibson	L/L	6 ft 1 in (1.85 m)	210 lb (95 kg)	Fr	Tampa, Florida
32	OF	Tristan Bissetta	L/L	6 ft 1 in (1.85 m)	225 lb (102 kg)	Sr	Greenville, South Carolina
33	RHP	Landon Koenig	R/R	6 ft 6 in (1.98 m)	245 lb (111 kg)	Jr	Page, North Dakota
34	RHP	Landon Waters	R/R	6 ft 1 in (1.85 m)	210 lb (95 kg)	Sr	Grenada, Mississippi
35	RHP	Owen Hancock	R/R	6 ft 5 in (1.96 m)	205 lb (93 kg)	So	Sylvester, Georgia
36	INF	Will Furniss	L/R	6 ft 4 in (1.93 m)	240 lb (109 kg)	Sr	Nacogdoches, Texas
38	RHP	Terry Hayes Jr.	L/R	6 ft 4 in (1.93 m)	225 lb (102 kg)	So	Renton, Washington
39	RHP	Blake Ilitch	R/R	6 ft 4 in (1.93 m)	220 lb (100 kg)	Fr	Detroit, Michigan
40	RHP	JP Robertson	R/R	6 ft 0 in (1.83 m)	190 lb (86 kg)	So	Madison, Mississippi
43	RHP	Evan Farrow	R/R	6 ft 5 in (1.96 m)	205 lb (93 kg)	Fr	Austin, Texas
44	RHP	Jake Reigert (redshirt)	R/R	6 ft 6 in (1.98 m)	238 lb (108 kg)	Fr	Cottage Grove, Minnesota
45	LHP	Wil Libbert	L/L	6 ft 1 in (1.85 m)	215 lb (98 kg)	So	St. Thomas, Missouri
50	RHP	Taylor Rabe	R/R	6 ft 5 in (1.96 m)	200 lb (91 kg)	So	Greenville, South Carolina
55	RHP	Leo Odom	R/R	6 ft 2 in (1.88 m)	200 lb (91 kg)	Fr	Sumrall, Mississippi

Head coach

Mike Bianco (LSU)

Assistant coach(es)

Mike Clement (Morningside)
Carl Lafferty (Mississippi)
Joel Mangrum (Mississippi College)

Legend

- (C) Team captain
- (S) Suspended
- (I) Ineligible
- Injured
- Current redshirt

Roster
Last update: February 15, 2026

== Regular season ==
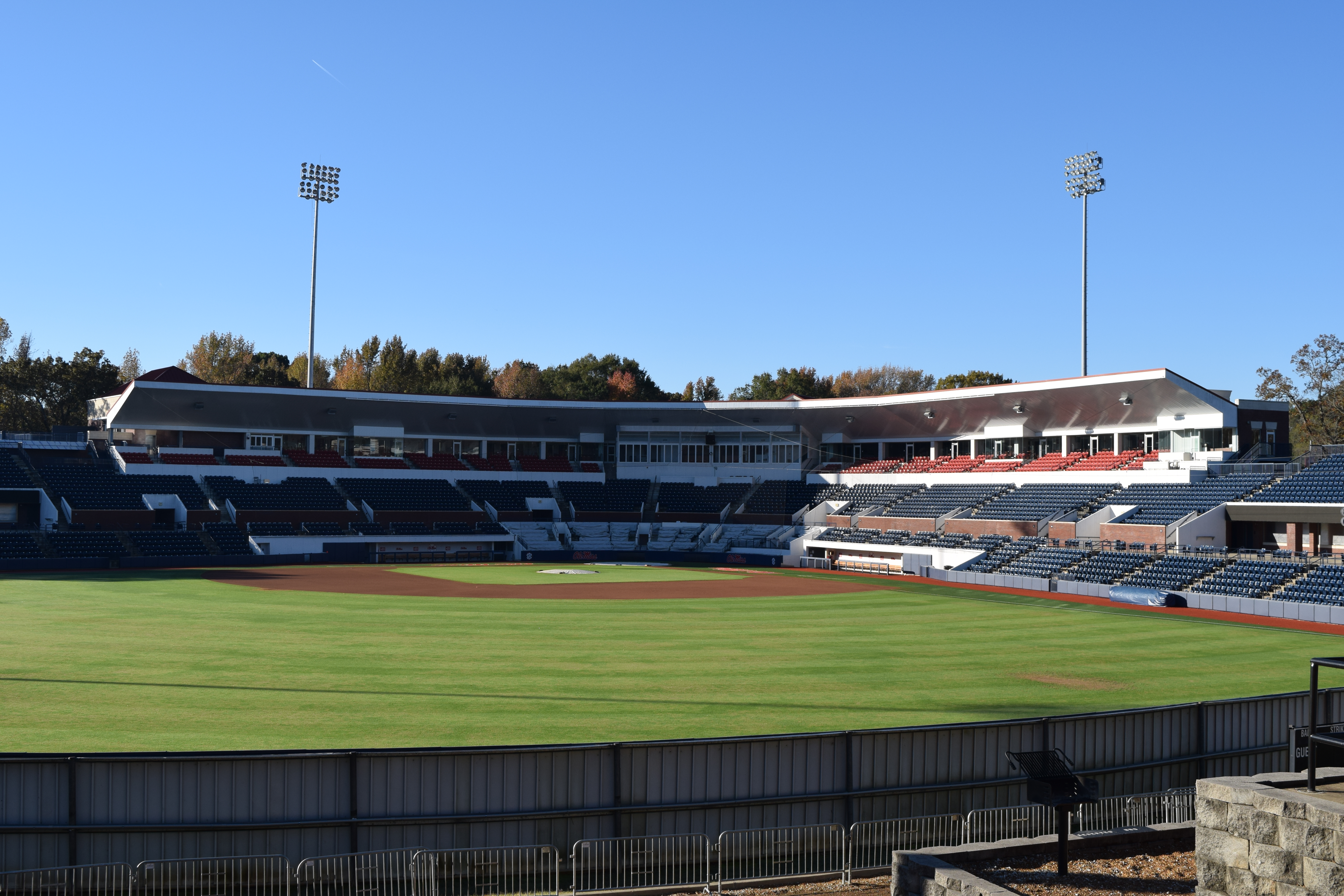
Ole Miss plays its home games at Swayze Field

The Rebels announced their schedule for the 2026 season, including nonconference and Southeastern Conference opponents, on September 9, 2025.

=== February ===
The Rebels opened play by hosting a three-game series against Nevada on the weekend of February 13–15. Ole Miss swept the Wolf Pack by scores of 11–3 on February 13, 5–1 on February 14, and 13–2 in seven innings on February 15. In their first midweek matchup of the season against Arkansas State on February 17, the Rebels won in walk-off fashion. Down by three runs in the fifth inning, the Rebels tied the game in the eighth before a Brayden Randle sacrifice fly in the bottom of the ninth plated the game-winning run for a 7–6 Rebel home victory. The following day, the Rebels beat in-state foe Jackson State by a score of 18–3 in seven innings.

On the weekend of February 20–22, the Rebels hosted their second nonconference weekend series, against Missouri State. The Rebels won the first game, 11–6, on February 20, the second, 6–3, on February 21, and the third, 3–2, on February 22. The Rebels' 8–0 start to the season was their best start since 2018. Following the series against Missouri State, Ole Miss entered the D1Baseball Top 25 rankings for the first time this season, placing No. 25. The Rebels won their only midweek game of the week against Southeast Missouri State at home on February 24 by a score of 13–3, before heading to Daikin Park in Houston for the weekend's BRUCE BOLT College Classic. In the first game of the tournament, on February 27, the Rebels were handed their first loss of the season by Baylor, by a score of 5–6 in ten innings. The following day, the Rebels defeated Ohio State 8–0 to finish off February with a 10–1 record, including a perfect 9–0 at home.

=== March ===
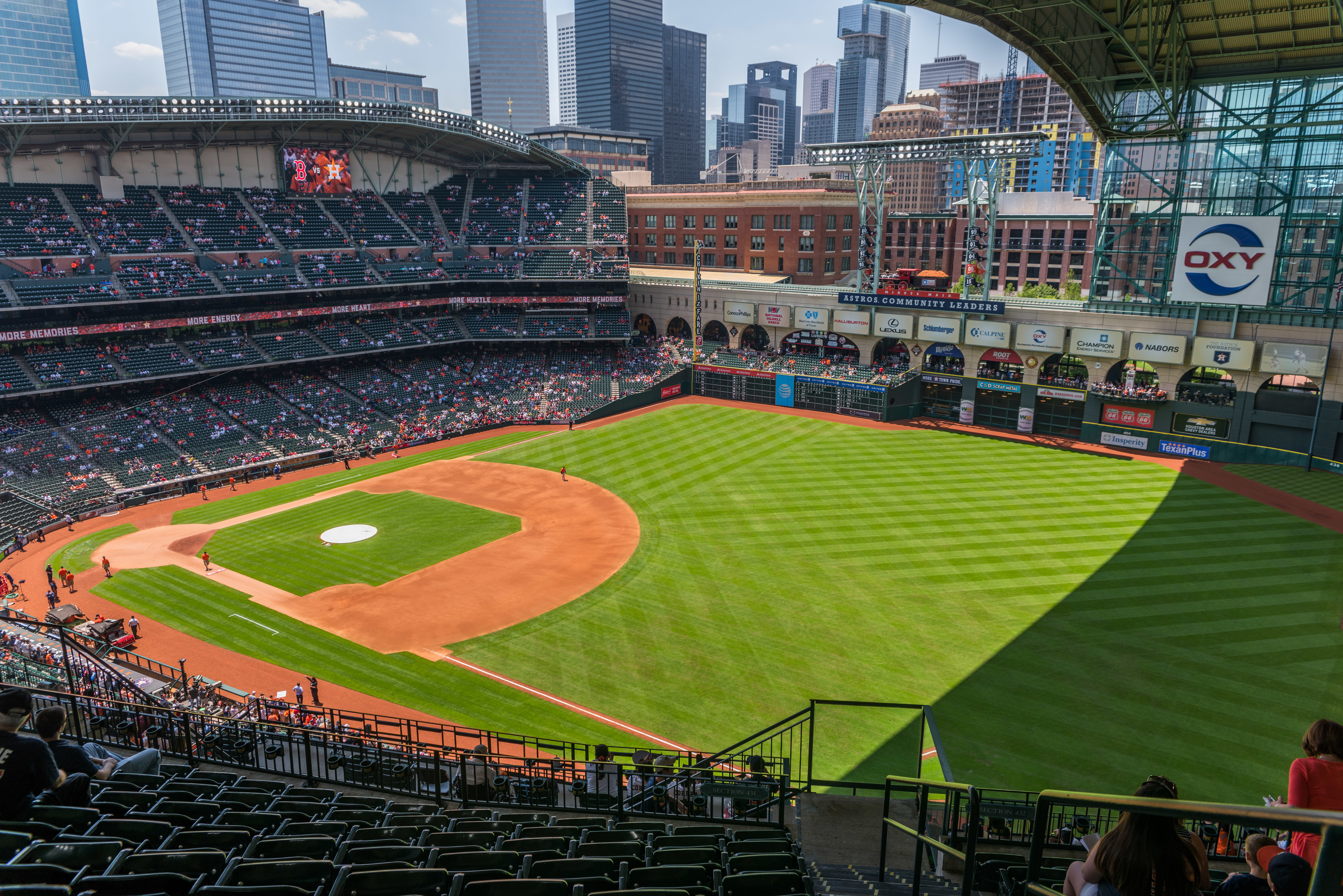
The Rebels played at Daikin Park in Houston, Texas, for the BRUCE BOLT College Classic from February 27 to March 1

The Rebels started the month of March with the final game of the BRUCE BOLT College Classic, against No. 9 Coastal Carolina on the first of the month. In their first ranked matchup of the season, the Rebels were soundly defeated, 2–9, meaning the Rebels went 1–2 in the tournament. Following the weekend, Ole Miss dropped out of D1Baseball's Top 25.

In a midweek game in which the Rebels hosted Memphis on March 3, the Rebels handled the Tigers by a score of 7–1. The following day, the Rebels defeated North Alabama at home. After trailing 1–4 by the bottom of the sixth, Ole Miss came back to defeat the Lions by a score of 8–5 before a home weekend series against Evansville. Due to a chance of rain, the Rebels and Purple Aces played a doubleheader on March 6. Ole Miss took both games, with the first game finishing 7–2 and the second ending 14–2 in seven innings. An 8–3 victory over the Purple Aces on March 8, saw the Rebels complete the series sweep. In this five game stretch, third baseman Judd Utermark went 7-for-17, amassing four home runs, and ten runs batted in. Utermark's performance earned him a spot on the Baseball America College Team of the Week for week four.

On March 10, Ole Miss traveled to Pete Taylor Park in Hattiesburg, Mississippi, to face No. 7 Southern Miss in a mid-week matchup. Tied 1–1 going into the bottom of the ninth inning, the Rebels blew the lead, losing 1–2 as a result of a Southern Miss walk-off hit.

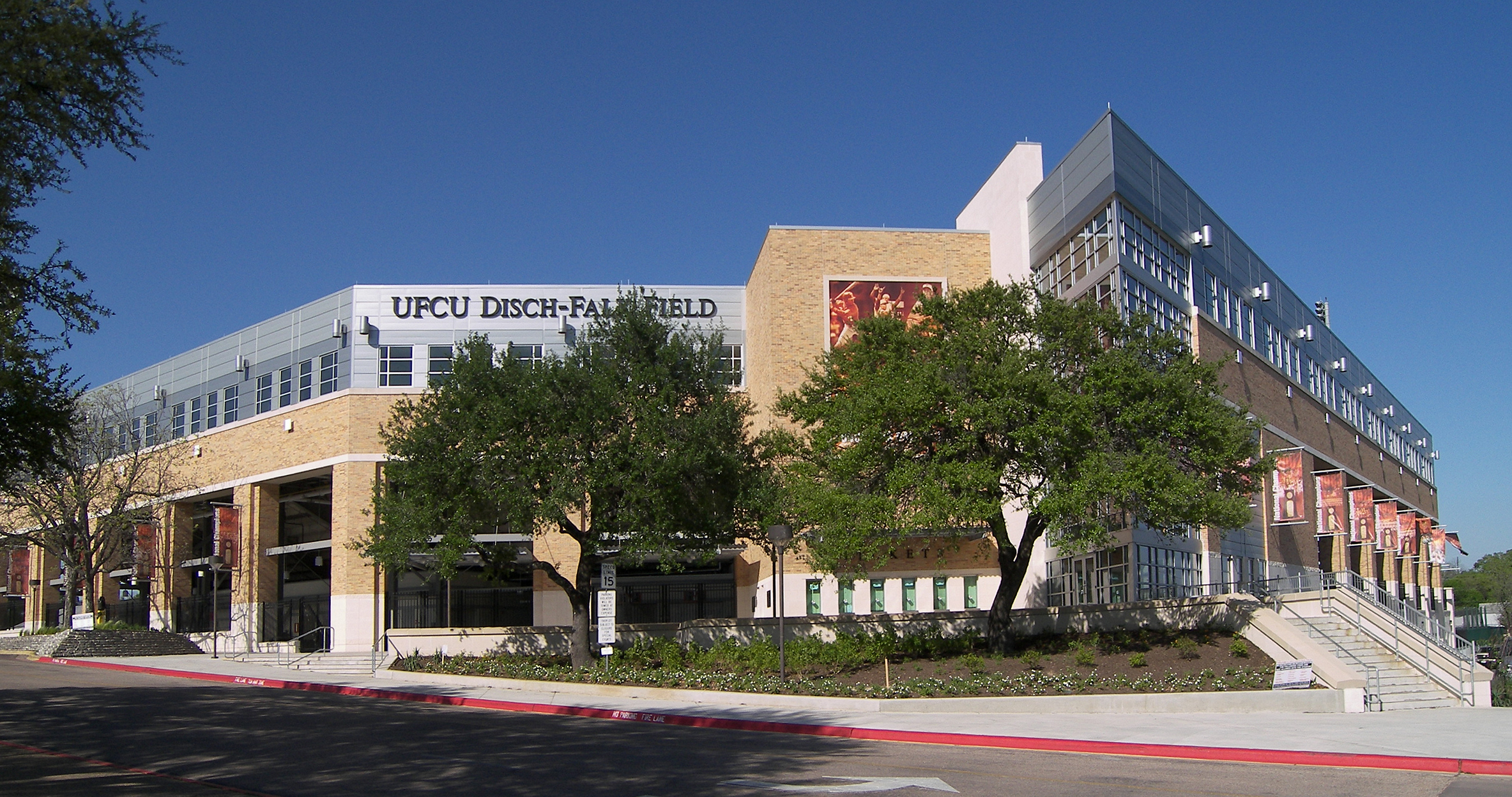
The Rebels opened SEC play at Texas' UFCU Disch–Falk Field on March 13–15

The Rebels opened Southeastern Conference play with an away weekend series against No. 2 Texas. The Rebels handed the Longhorns their first loss on March 13 after a back-and-forth game that lasted eleven innings. Down 3–7 in the top of the ninth inning, the Rebels scored five runs, including a grand slam from Tristan Bissetta. The Longhorns tied the game, 8–8 in the bottom of the ninth before a bases-loaded walk scored the winning run for the Rebels in the eleventh. The following day, the Longhorns defeated the Rebels in dominant fashion, 2–11. Texas got the series win on March 15, defeating the Rebels 2–8.

On March 17, the Rebels defeated Austin Peay at home, 9–5. The Rebels' SEC home opener took place against No. 15 Kentucky on March 19. Starter Hunter Elliot gave up no earned runs while Bissetta hit two home runs in the Rebels' 5–0 win, giving the Wildcats their first conference loss. The Wildcats followed with a 1–3 victory over the Rebels. In the rubber match, the Rebels secured their first SEC series win by a score of 12–9 over the Wildcats, with infielder Will Furniss breaking the 9–9 tie in the bottom of the eighth inning with a two-RBI single. Following the series, Ole Miss was ranked number 18 by D1Baseball for the following week. Bisetta's five home runs over the week earned him a spot on the Baseball America Week 6 College Team of the Week.

On March 24, the Rebels traveled to Memphis and were met with defeat, 2–6, before a home series against SEC in-state rival No. 6 Mississippi State. In the first game, on March 27, the Rebels led 4–3 going into the top of the ninth, before the Bulldogs scored two unanswered runs to take the opening game, 4–5. The following day, the Rebels fell by a wider margin, 1–6, securing the Bulldogs' ninth series win against the Rebels in the last ten years. The Bulldogs completed the series sweep on March 29, defeating Ole Miss, 1–7. The sweep affected the Rebels' polling numbers, and became unranked in any major poll when the following week's rankings were revealed.

The Rebels closed out the month of March with a 7–4 win against Little Rock at home on March 31. The Rebels finished the month with a 10–9 record, including a 9–4 home record, 1–4 away record, and a loss at a neutral site.

=== April ===
The Rebels opened the month of April with an away series against No. 21 Florida at Condron Ballpark in Gainesville, Florida. On April 2, the Rebels defeated the Gators by a 6–4 margin. The following day, the Rebels were shut out by the Gators, 0–2. In the rubber match on April 4, the Rebels were down 0–2 going into the ninth inning. A two-run home run by Judd Utermark off of Gators reliever Joshua Whritenour evened up the score, before a sacrifice fly from Brayden Randle gave the Rebels a one-run lead. Hayden Federico gave the Rebels two insurance runs by way of a single. In the bottom of the ninth, the Gators failed to score, giving the Rebels a 5–2 comeback victory to take the series.

Ahead of week eight, D1Baseball ranked Ole Miss No. 25 in the nation. On April 7, the Rebels hosted Alcorn State, defeating them soundly in seven innings by a score of 11–1. The Rebels then hosted No. 24 LSU that weekend. The Rebels started with a 6–3 victory on April 10, before a 12–2 win in seven innings on April 11 clinched the series for the Rebels. This marked Ole Miss' first run rule game since a 12–2 win against South Carolina the previous year. The Rebels finished off the sweep on April 12, by defeating the Tigers by a score of 8–7. Up by seven runs in the seventh inning, the Rebels gave up seven in the seventh to tie the game. Rebels shortstop Brayden Randle pushed across the winning run in the bottom of the eighth to give the Rebels their first SEC sweep of the season.

The Rebels remained ranked No. 25 for week nine. On April 14, the Rebels traveled to Trustmark Park in Pearl, Mississippi, for a neutral-site rematch against No. 22 Southern Miss. The Rebels made up for their early-season loss by defeating the Golden Eagles, 10–3. For weekend play, the Rebels traveled to Lindsey Nelson Stadium in Knoxville, Tennessee, to take on Tennessee. In the first game on April 17, the Rebels handled the Volunteers by a score of 7–4.

=== Game log ===
2026 Game Log: 41–23 (Home: 27–7; Away: 10–10; Neutral: 4–4)
February: 10–1 (Home: 9–0; Away: 0–0; Neutral: 1–1)

#	Date	Opponent	Rank	Score	Win	Loss	Save	Attendance	Record
1	February 13	Nevada		11–3	**Elliott** (1–0)	Desch (0–1)	**Calhoun** (1)	10,471	1–0
2	February 14	Nevada		5–1	**Rabe** (1–0)	Castro (0–1)	—	9,326	2–0
3	February 15	Nevada		13–2 (7)	**Libbert** (1–0)	Giacomini (0–1)	—	8,446	3–0
4	February 17	Arkansas State		7–6	**Koenig** (1–0)	Allen (0–1)	—	8,350	4–0
5	February 18	Jackson State		18–3 (7)	**Hancock** (1–0)	Burton (0–1)	—	8,347	5–0
6	February 20	Missouri State		11–6	**Calhoun** (1–0)	Yusypchuk (1–1)	—	9,807	6–0
7	February 21	Missouri State		6–3	**Rabe** (2–0)	Lucas (0–1)	**Koenig** (1)	9,893	7–0
8	February 22	Missouri State		3–2	**Robertson** (1–0)	Lucas (0–2)	—	8,397	8–0
9	February 24	Southeast Missouri State	No. 25	13–3 (7)	**Kelly** (1–0)	Kickhaefer (0–1)	—	8,198	9–0
10	February 27	vs. Baylor	No. 25	5–6 (10)	Bunch (3–1)	**Waters** (0–1)	—	13,427	9–1
11	February 28	vs. Ohio State	No. 25	8–0	**Townsend** (1–0)	Domke (1–2)	**Rabe** (1)	9,531	10–1

March: 10–9 (Home: 9–4; Away: 1–4; Neutral: 0–1)

#	Date	Opponent	Rank	Score	Win	Loss	Save	Attendance	Record
12	March 1	vs. No. 9 Coastal Carolina	No. 25	2–9	Doran (3–0)	**Libbert** (1–1)	Horn (1)	6,525	10–2
13	March 3	Memphis		7–1	**Gibson** (1–0)	Lucas (0–1)	—	8,604	11–2
14	March 4	North Alabama		8–5	**Robertson** (2–0)	Agosto (0–1)	**Koenig** (2)	8,471	12–2
15	March 6 (DH 1)	Evansville		7–2	**Elliott** (2–0)	Deverman (0–3)	**Calhoun** (2)	8,442	13–2
16	March 6 (DH 2)	Evansville		14–2 (7)	**Townsend** (2–0)	Hansmann (1–1)	—	8,532	14–2
17	March 8	Evansville		8–3	**Libbert** (2–1)	Reed (2–2)	—	8,315	15–2
18	March 10	@ No. 7 Southern Miss		1–2	Clark (3–0)	**Robertson** (2–1)	—	5,775	15–3
19	March 13	@ No. 2 Texas		9–8 (11)	**Rabe** (3–0)	Crossland (1–1)	**Waters** (1)	7,789	16–3 (1–0)
20	March 14	@ No. 2 Texas		2–11	Harrison (2–0)	**Gibson** (1–1)	—	7,830	16–4 (1–1)
21	March 15	@ No. 2 Texas		2–8	Volantis (2–0)	**Libbert** (2–2)	Cozart (1)	7,579	16–5 (1–2)
22	March 17	Austin Peay		9–5	**Hancock** (2–0)	Cox (0–2)	—	8,094	17–5
23	March 19	No. 15 Kentucky		5–0	**Elliott** (3–0)	Cleaver (1–1)	**Rabe** (2)	9,013	18–5 (2–2)
24	March 20	No. 15 Kentucky		1–3	Jelkin (5–0)	**Calhoun** (1–1)	Adcock (2)	9,710	18–6 (2–3)
25	March 21	No. 15 Kentucky		12–9	**Hooks** (1–0)	Bounds (2–1)	—	9,873	19–6 (3–3)
26	March 24	@ Memphis	No. 18	2–6	Dienes (1–0)	**Kelly** (1–1)	Fair (4)	1,261	19–7
27	March 27	No. 6 Mississippi State	No. 18	4–5	Pitzer (2–1)	**Rabe** (3–1)	—	11,758	19–8 (3–4)
28	March 28	No. 6 Mississippi State	No. 18	1–6	Valincius (6–0)	**Calhoun** (1–2)	—	11,336	19–9 (3–5)
29	March 29	No. 6 Mississippi State	No. 18	1–7	Stone (5–0)	**Townsend** (2–1)	—	9,408	19–10 (3–6)
30	March 31	Little Rock		7–4	**Allen** (1–0)	Brown (2–1)	**Waters** (2)	14,056	20–10

April: 11–5 (Home: 6–2; Away: 4–2; Neutral: 1–1)

#	Date	Opponent	Rank	Score	Win	Loss	Save	Attendance	Record
31	April 2	@ No. 21 Florida		6–4	**Calhoun** (2–2)	Peterson (1–2)	**Hooks** (1)	5,948	21–10 (4–6)
32	April 3	@ No. 21 Florida		0–2	King (4–2)	**Elliott** (3–1)	Whritenour (5)	5,911	21–11 (4–7)
33	April 4	@ No. 21 Florida		5–2	**Hooks** (2–0)	Whritenour (2–1)	—	5,847	22–11 (5–7)
34	April 7	Alcorn State	No. 25	11–1 (7)	**Odom** (1–0)	Castro (0–4)	—	8,342	23–11
35	April 10	No. 24 LSU	No. 25	6–3	**Hooks** (3–0)	Cowan (1–1)	—	10,835	24–11 (6–7)
36	April 11	No. 24 LSU	No. 25	12–2 (7)	**Townsend** (3–1)	Schmidt (4–3)	—	11,501	25–11 (7–7)
37	April 12	No. 24 LSU	No. 25	8–7	**Calhoun** (3–2)	Paz (0–2)	**Hooks** (2)	8,914	26–11 (8–7)
38	April 14	vs. No. 22 Southern Miss	No. 25	10–3	**Koenig** (2–0)	Littleton (1–1)	—	—	27–11
39	April 17	@ Tennessee	No. 25	7–4	**Elliott** (4–1)	Mack (3–3)	**Hooks** (3)	7,065	28–11 (9–7)
40	April 18	@ Tennessee	No. 25	8–1	**Townsend** (4–1)	Appenzeller (5–1)	**Hooks** (4)	7,430	29–11 (10–7)
41	April 19	@ Tennessee	No. 25	5–13	Blanco (4–2)	**Rabe** (3–2)	None	6,263	29–12 (10–8)
42	April 21	Murray State	No. 17	19–2 (7)	**Kelly** (2–1)	Chaudoin (0–1)	None	8,554	30–12
43	April 25 (DH 1)	No. 5 Georgia	No. 17	10–8	**Koenig** (3–0)	Byrd (2–2)	**Hooks** (5)	9,709	31–12 (11–8)
44	April 25 (DH 2)	No. 5 Georgia	No. 17	7–9 (14)	Farley (5–1)	**Calhoun** (3–3)	—	9,709	31–13 (11–9)
45	April 26	No. 5 Georgia	No. 17	1–5	Aoki (6–0)	**Rabe** (3–3)	Byrd (5)	8,956	31–14 (11–10)
46	April 28	vs. No. 10 Mississippi State	No. 17	3–7	Miller (4–2)	**Kelly** (2–2)	Burns (1)	8,223	31–15

May: 5–5 (Home: 3–1; Away: 2–4; Neutral: 0–0)

#	Date	Opponent	Rank	Score	Win	Loss	Save	Attendance	Record
47	May 1	@ No. 22 Arkansas	No. 17	2–12 (7)	Dietz (6–2)	**Elliott** (4–2)	—	10,676	31–16 (11–11)
48	May 2	@ No. 22 Arkansas	No. 17	11–4	**Townsend** (5–1)	Gibler (4–2)	—	10,491	32–16 (12–11)
49	May 3	@ No. 22 Arkansas	No. 17	4–5	McElvain (4–0)	**Hooks** (3–1)	—	9,891	32–17 (12–12)
50	May 8	No. 9 Texas A&M	No. 20	5–3	**Elliott** (5–2)	Darden (4–1)	**Hooks** (6)	9,027	33–17 (13–12)
51	May 9 (DH 1)	No. 9 Texas A&M	No. 20	5–18 (7)	Lyons (9–0)	**Townsend** (5–2)	—	8,791	33–18 (13–13)
52	May 9 (DH 2)	No. 9 Texas A&M	No. 20	6–5	**Robertson** (3–1)	Freshcorn (2–2)	**Hooks** (7)	10,249	34–18 (14–13)
53	May 12	UT Martin	No. 15	17–6 (7)	**Kelly** (3–2)	McCalla (1–1)	—	8,578	35–18
54	May 14	@ No. 18 Alabama	No. 15	4–5	Fay (9–3)	**Elliott** (5–3)	Heiberger (4)	3,700	35–19 (14–14)
55	May 15	@ No. 18 Alabama	No. 15	9–0	**Rabe** (4–3)	Adams (6–4)	**Robertson** (1)	4,180	36–19 (15–14)
56	May 16	@ No. 18 Alabama	No. 15	2–6	Upchurch (8–3)	**Townsend** (5–3)	—	4,315	36–20 (15–15)

SEC Tournament: 0–1 (Home: 0–0; Away: 0–0; Neutral: 0–1)

#	Date	Opponent	Rank	Score	Win	Loss	Save	Attendance	Record
57	May 19	vs. (16) Missouri	(9) No. 17	8–10	Skidmore (3–0)	**Koenig (3–1)**	–	–	36–21

NCAA Lincoln Regional: 3–0 (Home: 0–0; Away: 1–0; Neutral: 2–0)

#	Date	Opponent	Rank	Score	Win	Loss	Save	Attendance	Record
58	May 29	vs. (3) No. 22 Arizona State	(2) No. 18	7–6 (14)	**Calhoun** (4–3)	Alba (3–3)	–	–	37–21
59	May 30	at (1) No. 20 Nebraska	(2) No. 18	6–3	**Rabe** (5–3)	Horn (3–3)	**Calhoun** (3)	7,835	38–21
60	May 31	vs. (3) No. 22 Arizona State	(2) No. 18	5–4 (10)	**Robertson** (4–1)	Schaefer (1–3)	–	–	39–21

NCAA Auburn Super Regional: 2–0 (Home: 0–0; Away: 2–0; Neutral: 0–0)

#	Date	Opponent	Rank	Score	Win	Loss	Save	Attendance	Record
61	June 5	at (1) No. 4 Auburn	(2) No. 18	6–4	**Calhoun**(5–3)	Alvarez (10–4)	**Hooks** (8)	10,627	40–21
62	June 6	at (1) No. 4 Auburn	(2) No. 18	5–3	**Robertson**(5–1)	Sanders (5–2)	**Hooks** (9)	10,635	41–21

NCAA Men's College World Series: 0–2 (Home: 0–0; Away: 0–0; Neutral: 0–2)

#	Date	Opponent	Rank	Score	Win	Loss	Save	Attendance	Record
63	June 12	vs. (1) No. 5 North Carolina	(2) No. 18	2–6	Glauber (11–0)	**Calhoun** (5–4)	–	24,883	41–22
64	June 14	vs. (3) Troy	(2) No. 18	8-12	Thigpen (1-5)	**Robertson** (5-2)	–	24,013	41-23

Legend: = Win = Loss = Postponement
Bold = Rebels team member
All rankings are from D1Baseball

== Postseason ==
=== Conference tournament ===
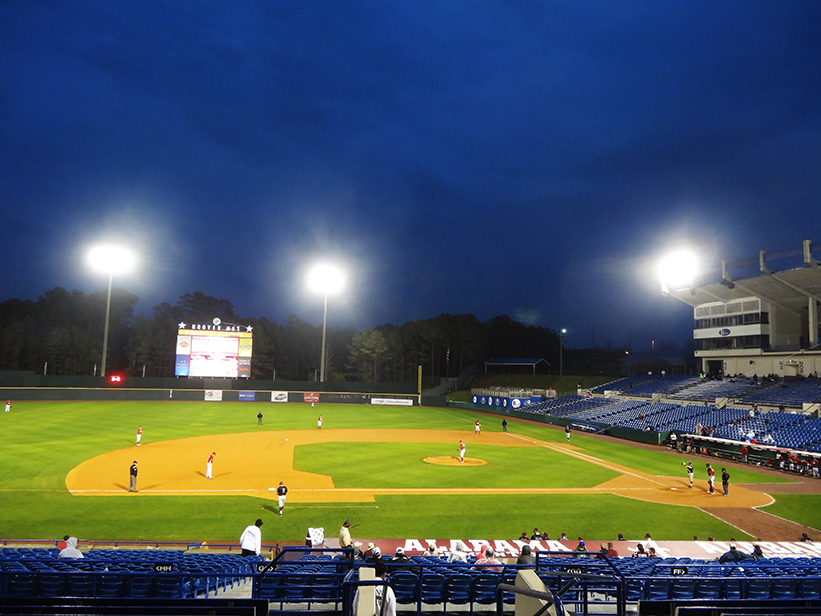
The SEC conference tournament will take place at Hoover Metropolitan Stadium

The 2026 Southeastern Conference baseball tournament will be held from May 19–24 at Hoover Metropolitan Stadium in Hoover, Alabama.

== Record vs. conference opponents ==
Blank are not scheduled. Blue are home games, otherwise away.

2026 SEC baseball records Source: 2026 SEC baseball game results, 2026 SEC baseball schedule
Tm	W–L	ALA	ARK	AUB	FLA	UGA	KEN	LSU	MSU	MIZ	OKL	OMS	SCA	TEN	TEX	TAM	VAN	Tm	SR	SW
ALA	18–12		0–3	3–0	3–0	.	0–3	.	.	.	2–1	2–1	3–0	1–2	1–2	.	3–0	ALA	6–4	4–2
ARK	17–13	3–0		1–2	0–3	1–2	2–1	.	2–1	2–1	2–1	2–1	2–1	.	.	.	.	ARK	7–3	1–1
AUB	17–13	0–3	2–1		2–1	1–2	2–1	.	2–1	3–0	2–1	.	.	.	1–2	2–1	.	AUB	7–3	1–1
FLA	18–12	0–3	3–0	1–2		2–1	2–1	3–0	.	.	2–1	1–2	3–0	.	.	1–2	.	FLA	6–4	3–1
UGA	23–7	.	2–1	2–1	1–2		.	3–0	3–0	3–0	.	2–1	3–0	2–1	.	2–1	.	UGA	9–1	4–0
KEN	13–17	3–0	1–2	1–2	1–2	.		1–2	.	1–2	.	1–2	1–2	2–1	.	.	1–2	KEN	2–8	1–0
LSU	9–21	.	.	.	0–3	0–3	2–1		0–3	.	1–2	0–3	3–0	2–1	.	0–3	1–2	LSU	3–7	1–5
MSU	16–14	.	1–2	1–2	.	0–3	.	3–0		.	.	3–0	3–0	0–3	1–2	1–2	3–0	MSU	4–6	4–2
MIZ	6–24	.	1–2	0–3	.	0–3	2–1	.	.		0–3	.	0–3	1–2	0–3	0–3	2–1	MIZ	2–8	0–6
OKL	14–16	1–2	1–2	1–2	1–2	.	.	2–1	.	3–0		.	.	1–2	0–3	2–1	2–1	OKL	4–6	1–1
OMS	15–15	1–2	1–2	.	2–1	1–2	2–1	3–0	0–3	.	.		.	2–1	1–2	2–1	.	OMS	5–5	1–1
SCA	7–23	0–3	1–2	.	0–3	0–3	2–1	0–3	0–3	3–0	.	.		.	1–2	.	0–3	SCA	2–8	1–6
TEN	15–15	2–1	.	.	.	1–2	1–2	1–2	3–0	2–1	2–1	1–2	.		2–1	.	0–3	TEN	5–5	1–1
TEX	19–10	2–1	.	2–1	.	.	.	.	2–1	3–0	3–0	2–1	2–1	1–2		0–2	2–1	TEX	8–2	2–0
TAM	18–11	.	.	1–2	2–1	1–2	.	3–0	2–1	3–0	1–2	1–2	.	.	2–0		2–1	TAM	6–4	2–0
VAN	14–16	0–3	.	.	.	.	2–1	2–1	0–3	1–2	1–2	.	3–0	3–0	1–2	1–2		VAN	4–6	2–2
Tm	W–L	ALA	ARK	AUB	FLA	UGA	KEN	LSU	MSU	MIZ	OKL	OMS	SCA	TEN	TEX	TAM	VAN	Team	SR	SW

Updated for entire regular season. Texas at Texas A&M, one game cancelled.
Tie breakers: Alabama over Florida (using head-to-head result), Auburn over Arkansas (using head-to-head result), Ole Miss over Tennessee (using head-to-head result), Oklahoma over Vanderbilt (using head-to-head result).

== Rankings ==
Ranking movements Legend: ██ Increase in ranking ██ Decrease in ranking — = Not ranked RV = Received votes т = Tied with team above or below
	Week																	
Poll	Pre	1	2	3	4	5	6	7	8	9	10	11	12	13	14	15	16	Final
Coaches'	RV	RV*	21	RV	24	24	18т	RV	RV	23	18	18	23	19	20	20	20*	7
Baseball America	16	16	11	17	16	19	17	—	—	24	22	22	—	22	25	25*	25*	8
NCBWA†	28	RV	25	RV	RV	RV	20	RV	RV	22	19	18	23	20	21	21*	13	8
D1Baseball	—	—	25	—	—	—	18	—	25	25	17	17	20	15	17	18	18*	7
Perfect Game	—	—	—	—	—	—	19	—	—	25	19	22	—	24	—	—*	—*	8

† NCBWA ranks 30 teams in their preseason poll, but only ranks 25 teams weekly during the season.
* A new poll was not released for this week, so for comparison purposes, the previous week's ranking is inserted in this week's slot.
