= 2026 LSU Tigers baseball team =

2026 season of Louisiana State University baseball team

2026 LSU Tigers baseball

Jax College Baseball Classic champions
- Conference: Southeastern Conference
- Record: 30–28 (9–21 SEC)
- Head coach: Jay Johnson (5th season)
- Assistant coaches: Josh Jordan (5th season); Josh Simpson (5th season)
- Hitting coach: Marc Wanaka (5th season)
- Pitching coach: Nate Yeskie (3rd season)
- Home stadium: Alex Box Stadium

2026 Southeastern Conference baseball standings
| | Conf. | | | | Overall |
| Team | W | | L | PCT | W | | L | PCT |
|---|---|---|---|---|---|---|---|---|
| No. 3 Georgia ‍†‍‡‍^{y} | 23 | – | 7 | .767 | 53 | – | 14 | .791 |
| No. 5 Texas ‍‍‍^{y} | 19 | – | 10 | .655 | 46 | – | 15 | .754 |
| No. 17 Texas A&M ‍‍‍^{y} | 18 | – | 11 | .621 | 41 | – | 16 | .719 |
| No. 6 Alabama ‍‍‍^{y} | 18 | – | 12 | .600 | 42 | – | 21 | .667 |
| No. 16 Florida ‍‍‍^{y} | 18 | – | 12 | .600 | 41 | – | 21 | .661 |
| No. 9 Auburn ‍‍‍^{y} | 17 | – | 13 | .567 | 42 | – | 22 | .656 |
| No. 23 Arkansas ‍‍‍^{y} | 17 | – | 13 | .567 | 41 | – | 22 | .651 |
| No. 14 Mississippi State ‍‍‍^{y} | 16 | – | 14 | .533 | 43 | – | 19 | .694 |
| No. 7 Ole Miss ‍‍‍^{y} | 15 | – | 15 | .500 | 41 | – | 23 | .641 |
| Tennessee ‍‍‍^{y} | 15 | – | 15 | .500 | 38 | – | 22 | .633 |
| No. 1 Oklahoma ‍‍‍^{y} | 14 | – | 16 | .467 | 43 | – | 23 | .652 |
| Vanderbilt ‍‍‍ | 14 | – | 16 | .467 | 33 | – | 25 | .569 |
| Kentucky ‍‍‍^{y} | 13 | – | 17 | .433 | 33 | – | 23 | .589 |
| LSU ‍‍‍ | 9 | – | 21 | .300 | 30 | – | 28 | .517 |
| South Carolina ‍‍‍ | 7 | – | 23 | .233 | 22 | – | 35 | .386 |
| Missouri ‍‍‍ | 6 | – | 24 | .200 | 24 | – | 31 | .436 |
† – Conference champion ‡ – Tournament champion y – Invited to the NCAA Tournament; As of June 22, 2026; Rankings from D1Baseball

The 2026 LSU Tigers baseball team represents Louisiana State University during the 2026 NCAA Division I baseball season. The Tigers play their home games at Alex Box Stadium, and they entered the season as the defending national champions.

== Preseason ==
=== Preseason SEC awards and honors ===
Preseason All-SEC Team
| Player | No. | Position | Team | Class |
| Derek Curiel | 6 | OF | First Team | Sophomore |
| Casan Evans | 20 | RHP | First Team | Sophomore |
| Zac Cowan | 26 | RHP | First Team | Senior |
| Steven Milam | 4 | SS | Second Team | Junior |
| Jake Brown | 7 | OF | Second Team | Junior |

=== SEC coaches poll ===
SEC coaches poll
| Predicted finish | Team | Votes (1st place) |
| 1 | LSU | 231 (9) |
| 2 | Texas | 214 (1) |
| 3 | Mississippi State | 205 (4) |
| 4 | Arkansas | 203 (2) |
| 5 | Auburn | 175 |
| 6 | Tennessee | 162 |
| 7 | Florida | 156 |
| 8 | Vanderbilt | 151 |
| 9 | Georgia | 133 |
| 10 | Ole Miss | 110 |
| 11 | Kentucky | 99 |
| 12 | Alabama | 87 |
| 13 | Texas A&M | 86 |
| 14 | Oklahoma | 84 |
| 15 | South Carolina | 49 |
| 16 | Missouri | 31 |

== Personnel ==
=== Starters ===
Lineup
| Pos. | No. | Player. | Year |
|---|---|---|---|
| C | 0 | Cade Arrambide | SO. |
| 1B | 18 | Mason Braun | FR. |
| 2B | 32 | Jack Ruckert | FR. |
| 3B | 11 | John Pearson | SO. |
| SS | 4 | Steven Milam | JR. |
| LF | 1 | Chris Stanfield | SR. |
| CF | 6 | Derek Curiel | SO. |
| RF | 23 | William Patrick | FR |
| DH | 10 | Brayden Simpson | SR. |

Weekend pitching rotation
| Day | No. | Player. | Year |
|---|---|---|---|
| Friday | 28 | Danny Lachenmayer | SO. |
| Saturday | 97 | Marcos Paz | FR. |
| Sunday | 26 | Zac Cowan | SR. |
| Midweek | 40 | Grant Fontenot | SR. |

=== Roster ===
2026 LSU Tigers baseball team
Players
Coaches

| # | Pos. | Name | B/T | Height | Weight | Year | Home town |
|---|---|---|---|---|---|---|---|
| 0 | C | Cade Arrambide | R/R | 6 ft 3 in (1.91 m) | 204 lb (93 kg) | So | Tomball, TX |
| 1 | OF | Chris Stanfield | R/R | 6 ft 2 in (1.88 m) | 195 lb (88 kg) | Sr | Tallahassee, FL |
| 4 | INF | Steven Milam | S/R | 5 ft 8 in (1.73 m) | 177 lb (80 kg) | Jr | Las Cruces, NM |
| 5 | INF | Tanner Reaves | L/R | 6 ft 1 in (1.85 m) | 165 lb (75 kg) | Gr | Bonham, TX |
| 6 | OF | Derek Curiel | L/L | 6 ft 2 in (1.88 m) | 182 lb (83 kg) | So | West Covina, CA |
| 7 | OF | Jake Brown | L/L | 6 ft 2 in (1.88 m) | 205 lb (93 kg) | Jr | Sulphur, LA |
| 8 | RHP | Gavin Guidry | R/R | 6 ft 2 in (1.88 m) | 182 lb (83 kg) | RS Jr | Lake Charles, LA |
| 9 | RHP | William Schmidt | R/R | 6 ft 4 in (1.93 m) | 188 lb (85 kg) | So | Baton Rouge, LA |
| 10 | INF | Brayden Simpson | R/R | 6 ft 1 in (1.85 m) | 190 lb (86 kg) | Sr | Moseley, VA |
| 11 | UTL | John Pearson | R/R | 6 ft 0 in (1.83 m) | 248 lb (112 kg) | So | West Monroe, LA |
| 13 | C | Edward Yamin IV | R/R | 6 ft 5 in (1.96 m) | 220 lb (100 kg) | RS Jr | West Sand Lake, NY |
| 14 | OF | Daniel Harden | L/L | 6 ft 2 in (1.88 m) | 205 lb (93 kg) | Jr | Prairieville, LA |
| 16 | INF | Ethan Clauss | L/R | 6 ft 2 in (1.88 m) | 190 lb (86 kg) | Fr | Las Vegas, NV |
| 17 | RHP | Mavrick Rizy | R/R | 6 ft 9 in (2.06 m) | 253 lb (115 kg) | So | Fiskdale, MA |
| 18 | INF | Mason Braun | L/L | 6 ft 0 in (1.83 m) | 195 lb (88 kg) | Fr | South Bend, IN |
| 20 | RHP | Casan Evans | R/R | 6 ft 2 in (1.88 m) | 194 lb (88 kg) | So | Houston, TX |
| 22 | RHP | Cooper Moore | R/R | 6 ft 1 in (1.85 m) | 200 lb (91 kg) | Jr | Bixby, OK |
| 23 | OF | William Patrick | R/R | 6 ft 2 in (1.88 m) | 200 lb (91 kg) | Fr | Monroe, LA |
| 24 | INF | Seth Dardar | L/R | 6 ft 2 in (1.88 m) | 220 lb (100 kg) | Gr | Mandeville, LA |
| 25 | C | Omar Serna Jr. | R/R | 6 ft 2 in (1.88 m) | 225 lb (102 kg) | Fr | Houston, TX |
| 26 | RHP | Zac Cowan | S/R | 5 ft 11 in (1.8 m) | 203 lb (92 kg) | Sr | Blythewood, SC |
| 27 | RHP | Jaden Noot | R/R | 6 ft 4 in (1.93 m) | 228 lb (103 kg) | RS Jr | Oak Park, CA |
| 28 | LHP | Danny Lachenmayer | R/L | 6 ft 3 in (1.91 m) | 195 lb (88 kg) | So | Eagan, MN |
| 29 | LHP | Cooper Williams | L/L | 6 ft 4 in (1.93 m) | 200 lb (91 kg) | So | Alvin, TX |
| 30 | RHP | Dax Dathe | R/R | 6 ft 3 in (1.91 m) | 214 lb (97 kg) | RS Sr | Round Rock, TX |
| 32 | INF | Jack Ruckert | L/R | 6 ft 1 in (1.85 m) | 185 lb (84 kg) | Fr | Baton Rouge, LA |
| 33 | INF | Zach Yorke | L/R | 6 ft 2 in (1.88 m) | 295 lb (134 kg) | Sr | Campbell, CA |
| 34 | LHP | Santiago Garcia | L/L | 6 ft 0 in (1.83 m) | 180 lb (82 kg) | Jr | Las Cruces, NM |
| 35 | RHP | Reagan Ricken | R/R | 6 ft 5 in (1.96 m) | 220 lb (100 kg) | Fr | Temecula, CA |
| 38 | LHP | Ethan Plog | L/L | 6 ft 1 in (1.85 m) | 185 lb (84 kg) | So | Green Bay, WI |
| 39 | LHP | Jonah Aase | L/L | 6 ft 1 in (1.85 m) | 190 lb (86 kg) | Fr | Ferndale, WA |
| 40 | RHP | Grant Fontenot | R/R | 6 ft 3 in (1.91 m) | 225 lb (102 kg) | Gr | Lafayette, LA |
| 41 | LHP | DJ Primeaux | L/L | 5 ft 10 in (1.78 m) | 201 lb (91 kg) | RS Jr | Baton Rouge, LA |
| 43 | RHP | Connor Benge | R/R | 6 ft 0 in (1.83 m) | 194 lb (88 kg) | Sr | Montgomery, TX |
| 44 | INF | Trent Caraway | R/R | 6 ft 2 in (1.88 m) | 203 lb (92 kg) | Jr | Dana Point, CA |
| 45 | RHP | Deven Sheerin | R/R | 6 ft 5 in (1.96 m) | 245 lb (111 kg) | RS So | Reading, PA |
| 50 | LHP | Ryler Smart | L/L | 6 ft 4 in (1.93 m) | 236 lb (107 kg) | RS Fr | Pearland, TX |
| 52 | RHP | Zion Theophilus | L/R | 6 ft 2 in (1.88 m) | 196 lb (89 kg) | Fr | Cincinnati, OH |
| 97 | RHP | Marcos Paz | R/R | 6 ft 2 in (1.88 m) | 220 lb (100 kg) | Fr | Carrollton, TX |

Head coach

Jay Johnson

Assistant coach(es)

Josh Jordan
Josh Simpson
Marc Wanaka
Nate Yeskie

Legend

- (C) Team captain
- (S) Suspended
- (I) Ineligible
- Injured
- Current redshirt

Roster
Last update: September 20, 2025

=== Coaching staff ===
2026 LSU Tigers baseball coaching staff
| Name | Position | Seasons at LSU | Alma Mater |
|---|---|---|---|
| Jay Johnson | Head coach | 5 | Point Loma Nazarene University (2001) |
| Josh Jordan | Assistant coach | 4 | Catawba College (2003) |
| Josh Simpson | Assistant coach | 5 | Northwestern Oklahoma State University (2003) |
| Marc Wanaka | Hitting coach | 5 | Bronte International University (2008) |
| Nate Yeskie | Pitching coach | 3 | University of Nevada, Las Vegas (2003) |

== Offseason ==
=== Departures ===
==== 2025 MLB Draft ====
2025 LSU Draft Class
| Round | Pick | Overall pick | Player | Position | MLB team | Source |
|---|---|---|---|---|---|---|
| 1 | 3 | 3 | Kade Anderson | LHP | Seattle Mariners | |
| 2 | 4 | 47 | Chase Shores | RHP | Los Angeles Angels | |
| 3 | 12 | 87 | Anthony Eyanson | RHP | Boston Red Sox | |
| 3 | 20 | 95 | Ethan Frey | OF | Houston Astros | |
| 6 | 20 | 185 | Daniel Dickinson | SS | Milwaukee Brewers | |
| 9 | 8 | 263 | Jared Jones | 1B | Pittsburgh Pirates | |
| 9 | 13 | 268 | Jacob Mayers | RHP | Boston Red Sox | |
| 10 | 22 | 307 | Kade Woods | RHP | Atlanta Braves | |
| 15 | 28 | 463 | Conner Ware | LHP | New York Mets | |

=== Acquisitions ===
==== Incoming transfers ====
Incoming transfers
| Name | Number | Pos. | Height | Weight | Hometown | Year | Previous school | Source |
|---|---|---|---|---|---|---|---|---|
| Brayden Simpson | 10 | INF | 6 ft 1 in (1.85 m) | 190 lb (86 kg) | Moseley, Virginia | Sr. | High Point | |
| Daniel Harden | 14 | OF | 6 ft 2 in (1.88 m) | 205 lb (93 kg) | Prairieville, Louisiana | Jr. | McLennan CC | |
| Cooper Moore | 22 | RHP | 6 ft 1 in (1.85 m) | 200 lb (91 kg) | Bixby, Oklahoma | Jr. | Kansas | |
| Seth Dardar | 24 | INF | 6 ft 2 in (1.88 m) | 220 lb (100 kg) | Mandeville, Louisiana | Gr. | Kansas State | |
| Danny Lachenmayer | 28 | LHP | 6 ft 3 in (1.91 m) | 195 lb (88 kg) | Eagan, Minnesota | So. | North Dakota State | |
| Dax Dathe | 30 | RHP | 6 ft 3 in (1.91 m) | 214 lb (97 kg) | Round Rock, Texas | Gr. | Angelo State | |
| Zach Yorke | 33 | INF | 6 ft 2 in (1.88 m) | 295 lb (134 kg) | Campbell, California | Sr. | Grand Canyon | |
| Santiago Garcia | 34 | LHP | 6 ft 0 in (1.83 m) | 180 lb (82 kg) | Las Cruces, New Mexico | Jr. | Oregon | |
| Ethan Plog | 38 | LHP | 6 ft 1 in (1.85 m) | 185 lb (84 kg) | Green Bay, Wisconsin | So. | Iowa Western CC | |
| Trent Caraway | 44 | INF | 6 ft 2 in (1.88 m) | 203 lb (92 kg) | Dana Point, California | Jr. | Oregon State | |
| Ryler Smart | 50 | INF | 6 ft 4 in (1.93 m) | 236 lb (107 kg) | Pearland, Texas | RS-Fr. | Tennessee | |

==== Incoming recruits ====
2026 LSU Recruits
| Name | Number | B/T | Pos. | Height | Weight | Hometown | High School | Source |
|---|---|---|---|---|---|---|---|---|
| Ethan Clauss | 16 | L/R | INF | 6 ft 2 in (1.88 m) | 190 lb (86 kg) | Las Vegas, Nevada | Palo Verde (NV) | |
| Mason Braun | 18 | L/L | OF | 6 ft 0 in (1.83 m) | 195 lb (88 kg) | South Bend, Indiana | Penn | |
| William Patrick | 23 | R/R | OF | 6 ft 2 in (1.88 m) | 200 lb (91 kg) | Monroe, Louisiana | St. Frederick (LA) | |
| Omar Serna, Jr. | 25 | R/R | C | 6 ft 2 in (1.88 m) | 225 lb (102 kg) | Houston, Texas | Lutheran South | |
| Jack Ruckert | 32 | L/R | INF | 6 ft 1 in (1.85 m) | 185 lb (84 kg) | Baton Rouge, Louisiana | Baton Rouge Catholic | |
| Reagan Ricken | 35 | R/R | RHP | 6 ft 5 in (1.96 m) | 220 lb (100 kg) | Temecula, California | Great Oak | |
| Jonah Aase | 39 | L/L | LHP | 6 ft 1 in (1.85 m) | 190 lb (86 kg) | Ferndale, Washington | Meridian (WA) | |
| Zion Theophilus | 52 | L/R | RHP | 6 ft 2 in (1.88 m) | 196 lb (89 kg) | Cincinnati, Ohio | Moeller | |
| Marcos Paz | 97 | R/R | RHP | 6 ft 2 in (1.88 m) | 220 lb (100 kg) | Carrollton, Texas | Hebron (TX) | |

== Game log ==
2026 LSU Tigers baseball game log (30–28)
Regular Season (29–27)

February (10–1)
| Date | TV | Opponent | Rank | Stadium | Score | Win | Loss | Save | Attendance | Overall | SEC | Source |
|---|---|---|---|---|---|---|---|---|---|---|---|---|
| February 13 | SECN+ | Milwaukee* | No. 2 | Alex Box Stadium; Baton Rouge, LA | **W** 15–5 (8) | **Guidry** (1–0) | Andrews (0–1) | None | 11,582 | 1–0 | — | |
| February 14 | SECN+ | Milwaukee* | No. 2 | Alex Box Stadium | **W** 5–3 | **Moore** (1–0) | Ehmke (0–1) | **Fontenot** (1) | 11,078 | 2–0 | — | |
| February 15 | SECN+ | Milwaukee* | No. 2 | Alex Box Stadium | **W** 21–7 (7) | **Schmidt** (1–0) | Arnold (0–1) | None | 10,753 | 3–0 | — | |
| February 16 | SECN+ | Kent State* | No. 2 | Alex Box Stadium | **W** 10–7 | **Plog** (1–0) | Jones (0–1) | **Guidry** (1) | 10,928 | 4–0 | — | |
| February 18 | SECN+ | Nicholls* | No. 2 | Alex Box Stadium | **W** 12–1 (8) | **Cowan** (1–0) | Mabry (0–2) | **Ricken** (1) | 11,164 | 5–0 | — | |
Jax College Baseball Classic
| February 20 | D1Baseball | vs. Indiana* | No. 2 | VyStar Ballpark; Jacksonville, FL | **W** 14–7 | **Guidry** (2–0) | Yarberry (0–1) | None | | 6–0 | — | |
| February 21 | D1Baseball | vs. Notre Dame* | No. 2 | VyStar Ballpark | **W** 9–4 | **Moore** (2–0) | Crowell (0–1) | None | | 7–0 | — | |
| February 22 | D1Baseball | vs. UCF* | No. 2 | VyStar Ballpark | **W** 11–0 (7) | **Schmidt** (2–0) | Wicker (1–1) | None | 5,777 | 8–0 | — | |
| February 24 | SECN+ | McNeese* | No. 2 | Alex Box Stadium | **L** 6–7 | Miller (1–0) | **Paz** (0–1) | Corcoran (1) | 10,959 | 8–1 | — | |
| February 27 | SECN+ | Dartmouth* | No. 2 | Alex Box Stadium | **W** 5–2 | **Guidry** (3–0) | Sejnoha (1–1) | None | 11,422 | 9–1 | — | |
| February 28 | SECN+ | Northeastern* | No. 2 | Alex Box Stadium | **W** 3–1 | **Moore** (3–0) | Sapienza (0–1) | **Sheerin** (1) | 11,839 | 10–1 | — | |

March (10–9)
| Date | TV | Opponent | Rank | Stadium | Score | Win | Loss | Save | Attendance | Overall | SEC | Source |
|---|---|---|---|---|---|---|---|---|---|---|---|---|
| March 1 | SECN+ | Dartmouth* | No. 2 | Alex Box Stadium | **W** 3–0 | **Schmidt** (3–0) | Albert (0–2) | **Noot** (1) | 10,940 | 11–1 | — | |
| March 2 | SECN+ | Northeastern* | No. 2 | Alex Box Stadium | **L** 10–13 | Griffin (1–0) | **Williams** (0–1) | Rogovic (1) | 10,292 | 11–2 | — | |
| March 4 | ESPN+ | at Louisiana* | No. 2 | Tigue Moore Field; Lafayette, LA | **L** 2–7 | Brasch (1–1) | **Guidry** (3–1) | None | 5,736 | 11–3 | — | |
| March 6 | SECN+ | Sacramento State* | No. 2 | Alex Box Stadium | **W** 15–4 (7) | **Evans** (1–0) | Lay (0–1) | None | 11,241 | 12–3 | — | |
| March 7 | SECN+ | Sacramento State* | No. 2 | Alex Box Stadium | **L** 4–5 | Carey (1–0) | **Moore** (3–1) | Wilson (2) | 10,755 | 12–4 | — | |
| March 8 | SECN+ | Sacramento State* | No. 2 | Alex Box Stadium | **L** 1–6 | Carson (1–1) | **Schmidt** (3–1) | Wilson (1) | 10,238 | 12–5 | — | |
| March 10 | SECN+ | Creighton* | No. 13 | Alex Box Stadium | **W** 8–4 | **Sheerin** (1–0) | Curtin (0–2) | **Garcia** (1) | 10,287 | 13–5 | — | |
| March 13 | SECN+ | at Vanderbilt | No. 13 | Hawkins Field; Nashville, TN | **L** 12–13 | Schlote (1–0) | **Guidry** (3–2) | None | 3,442 | 13–6 | 0–1 | |
| March 14 | SECN | at Vanderbilt | No. 13 | Hawkins Field | **L** 3–11 | Nadeau (1–0) | **Moore** (3–2) | None | 3,442 | 13–7 | 0–2 | |
| March 15 | SECN | at Vanderbilt | No. 13 | Hawkins Field | **W** 16–9 | **Sheerin** (2–0) | Seiber (2–1) | None | 3,442 | 14–7 | 1–2 | |
| March 17 | SECN+ | Grambling State* | | Alex Box Stadium | **W** 7–1 | **Williams** (1–1) | Goss (1–4) | None | 9,916 | 15–7 | — | |
| March 19 | SECN+ | No. 8 Oklahoma | | Alex Box Stadium | **W** 7–1 | **Evans** (2–0) | Johnson (3–1) | None | 11,217 | 16–7 | 2–2 | |
| March 20 | SECN+ | No. 8 Oklahoma | | Alex Box Stadium | **L** 2–4 | Mercurius (5–1) | **Moore** (3–3) | Cleveland (4) | 12,803 | 16–8 | 2–3 | |
| March 21 | SECN+ | No. 8 Oklahoma | | Alex Box Stadium | **L** 3–4 | Cleveland (2–0) | **Guidry** (3–3) | None | 12,503 | 16–9 | 2–4 | |
| March 24 | SECN+ | Louisiana Tech* | | Alex Box Stadium | **W** 15–5 (8) | **Plog** (2–0) | Nation (0–1) | **Garcia** (2) | 10,953 | 17–9 | — | |
| March 27 | SECN+ | No. 19 Kentucky | | Alex Box Stadium | **L** 4–7 | Jelkin (6–0) | **Evans** (2–1) | None | 11,828 | 17–10 | 2–5 | |
| March 28 | SECN+ | No. 19 Kentucky | | Alex Box Stadium | **W** 7–0 | **Schmidt** (4–1) | N. Harris (3–2) | **Cowan** (1) | 11,268 | 18–10 | 3–5 | |
| March 29 | SECN+ | No. 19 Kentucky | | Alex Box Stadium | **W** 17–10 | **Sheerin** (3–0) | Bennett (1–1) | **Fontenot** (2) | 11,010 | 19–10 | 4–5 | |
| March 31 | SECN+ | Southern* | | Alex Box Stadium | **W** 16–6 (7) | **Lachenmayer** (1–0) | Lebron (0–2) | None | 10,339 | 20–10 | — | |

April (5–11)
| Date | TV | Opponent | Rank | Stadium | Score | Win | Loss | Save | Attendance | Overall | SEC | Source |
|---|---|---|---|---|---|---|---|---|---|---|---|---|
| April 3 | SECN | at Tennessee | | Lindsey Nelson Stadium; Knoxville, TN | **W** 7–5 | **Garcia** (1–0) | Rhudy (0–1) | **Sheerin** (2) | 7,195 | 21–10 | 5–5 | |
| April 4 | ESPN2 | at Tennessee | | Lindsey Nelson Stadium | **L** 1–4 | Appenzeller (4–0) | **Schmidt** (4–2) | None | 7,259 | 21–11 | 5–6 | |
| April 5 | SECN | at Tennessee | | Lindsey Nelson Stadium | **W** 16–6 (12) | **Guidry** (4–3) | Krenzel (1–3) | None | 6,308 | 22–11 | 6–6 | |
| April 7 | SECN+ | Bethune–Cookman* | No. 24 | Alex Box Stadium | **L** 7–10 | Barroso (2–3) | **Garcia** (1) | Zambrano (1) | 10,847 | 22–12 | — | |
| April 10 | SECN+ | at No. 25 Ole Miss | No. 24 | Swayze Field; Oxford, MS | **L** 3–6 | Hooks (3–0) | **Cowan** (1–1) | None | 10,835 | 22–13 | 6–7 | |
| April 11 | SECN+ | at No. 25 Ole Miss | No. 24 | Swayze Field | **L** 2–12 (7) | Townsend (3–1) | **Schmidt** (4–3) | None | 11,501 | 22–14 | 6–8 | |
| April 12 | SECN+ | at No. 25 Ole Miss | No. 24 | Swayze Field | **L** 7–8 | Calhoun (3–2) | **Paz** (0–2) | Hooks (2) | 8,914 | 22–15 | 6–9 | |
| April 14 | SECN+ | Northwestern State* | | Alex Box Stadium | **W** 4–2 | **Benge** (1–0) | Prestwich (1–2) | **Sheerin** (3) | 10,662 | 23–15 | — | |
| April 17 | ESPN | No. 10 Texas A&M | | Alex Box Stadium | **L** 4–10 | Lyons (6–0) | **Evans** (2–2) | None | 11,704 | 23–16 | 6–10 | |
| April 18 | SECN | No. 10 Texas A&M | | Alex Box Stadium | **L** 2–7 | Sims (7–0) | **Schmidt** (4–4) | None | 12,325 | 23–17 | 6–11 | |
| April 19 | ESPN2 | No. 10 Texas A&M | | Alex Box Stadium | **L** 2–5 | Lyons (7–0) | **Cowan** (1–2) | None | 10,938 | 23–18 | 6–12 | |
| April 21 | SECN+ | New Orleans* | | Alex Box Stadium | **W** 10–7 | **Benge** (2–0) | Hymel (1–1) | None | 10,369 | 24–18 | — | |
| April 24 | SECN+ | at No. 15 Mississippi State | | Dudy Noble Field; Starkville, MS | **L** 8–10 (11) | Burns (2–0) | **Cowan** (1–3) | None | 13,489 | 24–19 | 6–13 | |
| April 25 | ESPN2 | at No. 15 Mississippi State | | Dudy Noble Field | **L** 8–9 | Bauer (3–0) | **Fontenot** (0–1) | Webb (3) | 15,289 | 24–20 | 6–14 | |
| April 26 | SECN+ | at No. 15 Mississippi State | | Dudy Noble Field | **L** 8–13 | Fowler (1–0) | **Sheerin** (3–1) | None | 12,379 | 24–21 | 6–15 | |
| April 28 | SECN+ | SE Louisiana* | | Alex Box Stadium | **W** 12–4 | **Lachenmeyer** (2–0) | Lee (1–1) | None | 10,367 | 25–21 | — | |

May (4–6)
| Date | TV | Opponent | Rank | Stadium | Score | Win | Loss | Save | Attendance | Overall | SEC | Source |
|---|---|---|---|---|---|---|---|---|---|---|---|---|
| May 2 | SECN+ | South Carolina | | Alex Box Stadium | **W** 6–1 | **Schmidt** (5–4) | Phillips (3–6) | **Fontenot** (3) | 10,395 | 26–21 | 7–15 | |
| May 2 | SECN+ | South Carolina | | Alex Box Stadium | **W** 7–3 | **Paz** (1–2) | Stone (5–3) | **Sheerin** (4) | 11,235 | 27–21 | 8–15 | |
| May 3 | SECN+ | South Carolina | | Alex Box Stadium | **W** 7–0 | **Cowan** (3–3) | Valentin (1–3) | None | 10,477 | 28–21 | 9–15 | |
| May 5 | SECN+ | Tulane* | | Alex Box Stadium | **W** 13–6 | **Lachenmayer** (2–0) | Navarro (2–2) | None | 10,457 | 29–21 | — | |
| May 8 | SECN+ | at No. 5 Georgia | | Foley Field; Athens, GA | **L** 8–11 | Byrd (3–2) | **Sheerin** (3–2) | None | 3,011 | 29–22 | 9–16 | |
| May 9 | SECN | at No. 5 Georgia | | Foley Field | **L** 8–13 | Farley (6–1) | **Paz** (1–3) | None | 3,633 | 29–23 | 9–17 | |
| May 10 | SECN | at No. 5 Georgia | | Foley Field | **L** 1–12 (7) | Aoki (8–0) | **Evans** (2–3) | None | 3,004 | 29–24 | 9–18 | |
| May 14 | SECN+ | No. 19 Florida | | Alex Box Stadium | **L** 8–11 | King (8–2) | **Lachenmeyer** (2–1) | None | 10,553 | 29–25 | 9–19 | |
| May 15 | SECN+ | No. 19 Florida | | Alex Box Stadium | **L** 1–11 (7) | Peterson (2–5) | **Paz** (1–4) | None | 10,759 | 29–26 | 9–20 | |
| May 16 | SECN+ | No. 19 Florida | | Alex Box Stadium | **L** 11–15 | Sandford (2–0) | **Fontenot** (0–2) | Walls (1) | 11,036 | 29–27 | 9–21 | |

Postseason (1–1)

SEC tournament (1–1)
| Date | TV | Opponent | Rank | Stadium | Score | Win | Loss | Save | Attendance | Overall | SECT Record | Source |
|---|---|---|---|---|---|---|---|---|---|---|---|---|
| May 19 | SECN | vs. (11) Oklahoma | (14) | Hoover Metropolitan Stadium; Hoover, AL | **W** 6–2 | | | | | 30–27 | 1–0 | |
| May 20 | SECN | vs. (6); No. 6 Auburn | (14) | Hoover Metropolitan Stadium | **L** 1–3 | | | | | 30–28 | 1–1 | |

Legend: = Win = Loss = Canceled
Bold = LSU team member * Non-conference game
Rankings are based on the team's current ranking in the D1Baseball poll.

== Record vs. conference opponents ==
Blank are not scheduled. Blue are home games, otherwise away.

2026 SEC baseball records Source: 2026 SEC baseball game results, 2026 SEC baseball schedule
| Tm | W–L | ALA | ARK | AUB | FLA | UGA | KEN | LSU | MSU | MIZ | OKL | OMS | SCA | TEN | TEX | TAM | VAN | Tm | SR | SW |
|---|---|---|---|---|---|---|---|---|---|---|---|---|---|---|---|---|---|---|---|---|
| ALA | 18–12 | | 0–3 | 3–0 | 3–0 | . | 0–3 | . | . | . | 2–1 | 2–1 | 3–0 | 1–2 | 1–2 | . | 3–0 | ALA | 6–4 | 4–2 |
| ARK | 17–13 | 3–0 | | 1–2 | 0–3 | 1–2 | 2–1 | . | 2–1 | 2–1 | 2–1 | 2–1 | 2–1 | . | . | . | . | ARK | 7–3 | 1–1 |
| AUB | 17–13 | 0–3 | 2–1 | | 2–1 | 1–2 | 2–1 | . | 2–1 | 3–0 | 2–1 | . | . | . | 1–2 | 2–1 | . | AUB | 7–3 | 1–1 |
| FLA | 18–12 | 0–3 | 3–0 | 1–2 | | 2–1 | 2–1 | 3–0 | . | . | 2–1 | 1–2 | 3–0 | . | . | 1–2 | . | FLA | 6–4 | 3–1 |
| UGA | 23–7 | . | 2–1 | 2–1 | 1–2 | | . | 3–0 | 3–0 | 3–0 | . | 2–1 | 3–0 | 2–1 | . | 2–1 | . | UGA | 9–1 | 4–0 |
| KEN | 13–17 | 3–0 | 1–2 | 1–2 | 1–2 | . | | 1–2 | . | 1–2 | . | 1–2 | 1–2 | 2–1 | . | . | 1–2 | KEN | 2–8 | 1–0 |
| LSU | 9–21 | . | . | . | 0–3 | 0–3 | 2–1 | | 0–3 | . | 1–2 | 0–3 | 3–0 | 2–1 | . | 0–3 | 1–2 | LSU | 3–7 | 1–5 |
| MSU | 16–14 | . | 1–2 | 1–2 | . | 0–3 | . | 3–0 | | . | . | 3–0 | 3–0 | 0–3 | 1–2 | 1–2 | 3–0 | MSU | 4–6 | 4–2 |
| MIZ | 6–24 | . | 1–2 | 0–3 | . | 0–3 | 2–1 | . | . | | 0–3 | . | 0–3 | 1–2 | 0–3 | 0–3 | 2–1 | MIZ | 2–8 | 0–6 |
| OKL | 14–16 | 1–2 | 1–2 | 1–2 | 1–2 | . | . | 2–1 | . | 3–0 | | . | . | 1–2 | 0–3 | 2–1 | 2–1 | OKL | 4–6 | 1–1 |
| OMS | 15–15 | 1–2 | 1–2 | . | 2–1 | 1–2 | 2–1 | 3–0 | 0–3 | . | . | | . | 2–1 | 1–2 | 2–1 | . | OMS | 5–5 | 1–1 |
| SCA | 7–23 | 0–3 | 1–2 | . | 0–3 | 0–3 | 2–1 | 0–3 | 0–3 | 3–0 | . | . | | . | 1–2 | . | 0–3 | SCA | 2–8 | 1–6 |
| TEN | 15–15 | 2–1 | . | . | . | 1–2 | 1–2 | 1–2 | 3–0 | 2–1 | 2–1 | 1–2 | . | | 2–1 | . | 0–3 | TEN | 5–5 | 1–1 |
| TEX | 19–10 | 2–1 | . | 2–1 | . | . | . | . | 2–1 | 3–0 | 3–0 | 2–1 | 2–1 | 1–2 | | 0–2 | 2–1 | TEX | 8–2 | 2–0 |
| TAM | 18–11 | . | . | 1–2 | 2–1 | 1–2 | . | 3–0 | 2–1 | 3–0 | 1–2 | 1–2 | . | . | 2–0 | | 2–1 | TAM | 6–4 | 2–0 |
| VAN | 14–16 | 0–3 | . | . | . | . | 2–1 | 2–1 | 0–3 | 1–2 | 1–2 | . | 3–0 | 3–0 | 1–2 | 1–2 | | VAN | 4–6 | 2–2 |
| Tm | W–L | ALA | ARK | AUB | FLA | UGA | KEN | LSU | MSU | MIZ | OKL | OMS | SCA | TEN | TEX | TAM | VAN | Team | SR | SW |

Updated for entire regular season. Texas at Texas A&M, one game cancelled.
Tie breakers: ALA>FLA hd to hd, AUB>ARK hd to hd, OMS>TEN hd to hd, OKL>VAN hd to hd.

== Rankings ==
Ranking movements Legend: ██ Increase in ranking ██ Decrease in ranking — = Not ranked RV = Received votes ( ) = First-place votes
| | Week | | | | | | | | | | | | | | | | |
| Poll | Pre | 1 | 2 | 3 | 4 | 5 | 6 | 7 | 8 | 9 | 10 | 11 | 12 | 13 | 14 | 15 | Final |
|---|---|---|---|---|---|---|---|---|---|---|---|---|---|---|---|---|---|
| Coaches' | 1 (15) | 1 (15)* | 1 (14) | 2 (4) | 13 | RV | RV | RV | RV | RV | — | | | | | | |
| Baseball America | 2 | 2 | 2 | 2 | 13 | — | — | — | — | — | — | | | | | | |
| NCBWA† | 1 | 1 | 1 | 2 | 9 | 20 | RV | RV | RV | — | — | | | | | | |
| D1Baseball | 2 | 2 | 2 | 2 | 13 | — | — | — | 24 | — | — | | | | | | |
| Perfect Game | 1 | 1 | 1 | 2 | 17 | — | — | — | — | — | — | | | | | | |

† NCBWA ranks 30 teams in their preseason poll, but only ranks 25 teams weekly during the season.
* A new poll was not released for this week, so for comparison purposes, the previous week's ranking is inserted in this week's slot.
