= Mississippi State–Ole Miss baseball rivalry =

College sports rivalry

Mayor's Trophy/Governor's Cup
Mayor's Trophy	Jackson, Mississippi
Mississippi (14)	Mississippi St. (13)
1982 1984; 1987 1989; 1991 1993; 1995 1999; 2000 2002; 2003 2004; 2005 2006	1980 1981; 1983 1985; 1986 1988; 1990 1992; 1994 1996; 1997 1998; 2001
Governor's Cup	Pearl, Mississippi
Mississippi (6)	Mississippi St. (12)
2009 2010; 2012 2015; 2022 2025	2007 2008; 2011 2013; 2014 2016; 2017 2018; 2019 2023; 2024 2026

The Mississippi State–Ole Miss baseball rivalry is a college baseball rivalry between the Mississippi State Bulldogs baseball team of Mississippi State University, in Starkville, Mississippi and the Ole Miss Rebels baseball team of the University of Mississippi in Oxford, Mississippi. The rivalry series has included a single neutral-site game since 1980, known first as the Mayor's Trophy and later as the Governor's Cup. This game is in addition to the games played as part of the Southeastern Conference schedule, but does not count towards the conference record.

== Mayor's Trophy ==
Started in 1980 by then Jackson, Mississippi Mayor Dale Danks, Jr., the Mayor's Trophy game had been one of the most anticipated match-ups of the Mississippi college baseball season as it featured Ole Miss versus Mississippi State. In the first 25 editions, the game has drawn an average of 4,887 fans per game. The Mayor's Trophy series ended after the 2006 match-up and was replaced by The Governor's Cup.

== Governor's Cup ==
With the 2007 season, the non-conference meeting between the two teams moved to Trustmark Park in Pearl, Mississippi – which is the home to the Mississippi Braves – and was begun anew as the two teams competed for the Governor's Cup for the first time.

- 2007 – As was the case with the Mayor's Trophy game, the two teams alternate serving as the designated home team. Mississippi, ranked #19, was the home team in the inaugural game on April 17, 2007. Mississippi State, ranked #15, won the game 14–9.
- 2008 – The unranked Bulldogs won again, 6–5, in 2008 in front of a Governor's Cup record 7,862 fans, taking a 2–0 lead in the Governor's Cup series over the #16 ranked Rebels.
- 2009 – The 17th ranked Mississippi Rebels took their first Governor's Cup on April 14, 2009 with an 8–1 victory. There was a crowd of 7,458 in attendance as Brett Bukvich recorded a career-high 11 strike-outs in six innings of work as he was named MVP. 7,458 is the 5th largest attendance mark recorded at Trustmark Park.
- 2010 – The 11th ranked Mississippi Rebels used strong pitching and steady hitting to edge Mississippi State 5–3 for their 2nd consecutive Governor's Cup victory. The MVP was Mississippi pitcher David Goforth.
- 2011 – Behind the strong pitching performances of Kendall Graveman, Chad Girodo, and Taylor Stark, Mississippi State rolled to a 6–1 victory over the Rebels to reclaim the cup in front of a crowd of 7,334.
- 2012 – The 22nd ranked Rebels struck out 16 Bulldog batters en route to a 6–3 victory in front of a rain-soaked crowd of 5533.
- 2013 – 16th ranked Mississippi State routed the 18th Ranked Mississippi by a score of 5–1 in front of a then stadium record crowd of 8,240.
- 2014 – 20th ranked Mississippi State defeated 12 ranked Mississippi 8–3 to claim back to back Governor's Cup wins for the first time since the 2007–2008 games. For the second year in a row, and the third time overall, both teams entered the game ranked in the top 25. The game once again set a Trustmark Park record with a crowd of 8,496.
- 2015 – Mississippi defeated Mississippi State 11–1.
- 2016 – The 3rd ranked Bulldogs defeated the 13th ranked Rebels 2–0 marking the first time that either team had been shutout since the series was renamed the Governor's Cup and the first shutout in the series since the Rebels won 1–0 in 2006.
- 2017 – The 11th ranked Bulldogs defeated the unranked Rebels 4–2, completing first 4-game sweep of the rebels since 1997.
- 2018 - The unranked Bulldogs defeated the 6th ranked Rebels 7-6 with a bottom of the 9th, walk-off 2-run double by Luke Alexander to clench their third straight Governor's Cup. The Bulldogs were 3-1 versus the Rebels during the 2018 season, winning the earlier SEC series at Dudy Noble Field to then 3rd ranked Rebels.
- 2020 - Canceled due to COVID-19
- 2021 - Canceled due to COVID-19

== Game results ==
Mississippi State victories	Ole Miss victories	Tie games

No.	Date	Location	Winner	Score
1	1980	Jackson	Mississippi State	9–2
2	1981	Jackson	Mississippi State	4–3
3	1982	Jackson	Ole Miss	8–5
4	1983	Jackson	Mississippi State	9–1
5	1984	Jackson	Ole Miss	4–3
6	1985	Jackson	Mississippi State	5–2
7	1986	Jackson	Mississippi State	8–5
8	1987	Jackson	Ole Miss	6–4
9	1988	Jackson	Mississippi State	7–4
10	1989	Jackson	Ole Miss	4–3
11	1990	Jackson	Mississippi State	4–1
12	1991	Jackson	Ole Miss	5–4
13	1992	Jackson	Mississippi State	4–3
14	1993	Jackson	Ole Miss	6–5
15	1994	Jackson	Mississippi State	5–3
16	1995	Jackson	Ole Miss	5–4

No.	Date	Location	Winner	Score
17	1996	Jackson	Mississippi State	8–4
18	1997	Jackson	Mississippi State	7–3
19	1998	Jackson	Mississippi State	9–3
20	1999	Jackson	Ole Miss	10–6
21	2000	Jackson	Ole Miss	4–1
22	2001	Jackson	Mississippi State	15–6
23	2002	Jackson	Ole Miss	8–4
24	2003	Jackson	Ole Miss	5–1
25	2004	Jackson	Ole Miss	10–4
26	2005	Jackson	Ole Miss	5–1
27	2006	Jackson	Ole Miss	1–0
28	2007	Pearl	Mississippi State	14–9
29	2008	Pearl	Mississippi State	6–5
30	2009	Pearl	Ole Miss	8–1
31	2010	Pearl	Ole Miss	5–3
32	2011	Pearl	Mississippi State	6–1

No.	Date	Location	Winner	Score
33	2012	Pearl	Ole Miss	6–3
34	2013	Pearl	Mississippi State	5–1
35	2014	Pearl	Mississippi State	8–3
36	2015	Pearl	Ole Miss	11–1
37	2016	Pearl	Mississippi State	2–0
38	2017	Pearl	Mississippi State	4–2
39	2018	Pearl	Mississippi State	7–6
40	2019	Pearl	Mississippi State	8–1
41	2022	Pearl	Ole Miss	5–2
42	2023	Pearl	Mississippi State	2–1
43	2024	Pearl	Mississippi State	5–1
44	2025	Pearl	Ole Miss	8–7
45	2026	Pearl	Mississippi State	7–3
Series: Mississippi State leads 25–20

== See also ==
- Egg Bowl (college football rivalry)
