= List of current NCAA Division I baseball coaches =

The following is a list of current NCAA Division I baseball coaches. Currently, 311 programs compete at the Division I level in NCAA college baseball. Each program employs a head coach. The longest-tenured head coach is Tim Sinicki, who has been the head coach at Binghamton since the start of the 1993 season.

== Coaches ==
The table below includes the program, conference, and head coach of each Division I baseball program. Conference affiliations are current for the coming 2027 NCAA baseball season.

Program	Conference	Head coach	First season
Albany	America East	Jon Mueller	2000
Binghamton	America East	Tim Sinicki	1993
Bryant	America East	Ryan Klosterman	2020
Maine	America East	Nick Derba	2018
NJIT	America East	Robbie McClellan	2019
UMass Lowell	America East	Nick Barese	2024
UMBC	America East	Dave Gage	2027
Charlotte	American	Robert Woodard	2020
East Carolina	American	Cliff Godwin	2015
Florida Atlantic	American	John McCormack	2009
Memphis	American	Matt Riser	2024
Rice	American	David Pierce	2025
South Florida	American	Mitch Hannahs	2025
Tulane	American	Jay Uhlman	2022
UAB	American	Casey Dunn	2022
UTSA	American	Patrick Hallmark	2020
Wichita State	American	Brian Green	2024
Bellarmine	Atlantic Sun	Ben Reel	2025
Florida Gulf Coast	Atlantic Sun	Dave Tollett	2003
Jacksonville	Atlantic Sun	Chris Hayes	2017
Lipscomb	Atlantic Sun	Jeff Forehand	2007
North Florida	Atlantic Sun	Joe Mercadante	2024
Queens	Atlantic Sun	James Cullinane	2027
Stetson	Atlantic Sun	Shane Gierke	2027
West Florida	Atlantic Sun	Mike Jeffcoat	2006
West Georgia	Atlantic Sun	Jeff Smith	2019
Boston College	Atlantic Coast	Todd Interdonato	2024
California	Atlantic Coast	Mike Neu	2018
Clemson	Atlantic Coast	Erik Bakich	2023
Duke	Atlantic Coast	Corey Muscara	2026
Florida State	Atlantic Coast	Link Jarrett	2023
Georgia Tech	Atlantic Coast	James Ramsey	2026
Louisville	Atlantic Coast	Dan McDonnell	2007
Miami (FL)	Atlantic Coast	J. D. Arteaga	2024
NC State	Atlantic Coast	Chris Hart	2027
North Carolina	Atlantic Coast	Scott Forbes	2021
Notre Dame	Atlantic Coast	Shawn Stiffler	2023
Pittsburgh	Atlantic Coast	Mike Bell	2019
Stanford	Atlantic Coast	David Esquer	2018
Virginia	Atlantic Coast	Chris Pollard	2026
Virginia Tech	Atlantic Coast	John Szefc	2018
Wake Forest	Atlantic Coast	Tom Walter	2010
Davidson	Atlantic 10	Rucker Taylor	2019
Dayton	Atlantic 10	Jayson King	2026 (Note: King previously served as head coach from 2018–2024.)
Fordham	Atlantic 10	Kevin Leighton	2012
George Mason	Atlantic 10	Shawn Camp	2023
George Washington	Atlantic 10	Gregg Ritchie	2013
La Salle	Atlantic 10	David Miller	2026 (Note: Miller previously served as head coach from 2018–2021.)
Rhode Island	Atlantic 10	Raphael Cerrato	2015
Richmond	Atlantic 10	Mik Aoki	2024
St. Bonaventure	Atlantic 10	Jason Rathbun	2023
Saint Joseph's	Atlantic 10	Fritz Hamburg	2009
Saint Louis	Atlantic 10	Miles Miller	2026
VCU	Atlantic 10	Sean Thompson	2025
Butler	Big East	Blake Beemer	2023
Creighton	Big East	Mark Kingston	2026
Georgetown	Big East	Edwin Thompson	2021
St. John's	Big East	Mike Hampton	2020
Seton Hall	Big East	Rob Sheppard	2004 (Note: Sheppard also served as Seton Hall's head coach for the 2001 season. He has held the position for a total of 24 seasons, as of the end of the 2026 season.)
UConn	Big East	Jim Penders	2004
Villanova	Big East	Kevin Mulvey	2017
Xavier	Big East	Billy O'Conner	2018
Charleston Southern	Big South	Karl Kuhn	2025
Gardner–Webb	Big South	Jim Chester	2020
High Point	Big South	Joey Hammond	2022
Longwood	Big South	Ray Noe	2025
Presbyterian	Big South	Elton Pollock	2005
Radford	Big South	Alex Guerra	2023
UNC Asheville	Big South	Alex Raburn (interim)	2026
USC Upstate	Big South	Kane Sweeney	2025
Winthrop	Big South	Mike McGuire	2025
Illinois	Big Ten	Dan Hartleb	2006
Indiana	Big Ten	Jeff Mercer	2019
Iowa	Big Ten	Rick Heller	2014
Maryland	Big Ten	Matt Swope	2024
Michigan	Big Ten	Tracy Smith	2023
Michigan State	Big Ten	Jake Boss	2009
Minnesota	Big Ten	Ty McDevitt	2025
Nebraska	Big Ten	Will Bolt	2020
Northwestern	Big Ten	Ben Greenspan	2024
Ohio State	Big Ten	Justin Haire	2025
Oregon	Big Ten	Mark Wasikowski	2020
Penn State	Big Ten	Mike Gambino	2024
Purdue	Big Ten	Greg Goff	2020
Rutgers	Big Ten	Steve Owens	2020
UCLA	Big Ten	John Savage	2005
USC	Big Ten	Andy Stankiewicz	2023
Washington	Big Ten	Eddie Smith	2025
Arizona	Big 12	Chip Hale	2022
Arizona State	Big 12	Willie Bloomquist	2022
Baylor	Big 12	Mitch Thompson	2023
BYU	Big 12	Trent Pratt	2022
Cincinnati	Big 12	Jordan Bischel	2024
Houston	Big 12	Will Davis	2027
Kansas	Big 12	Dan Fitzgerald	2023
Kansas State	Big 12	Pete Hughes	2019
Oklahoma State	Big 12	Josh Holliday	2013
TCU	Big 12	Kirk Saarloos	2022
Texas Tech	Big 12	Tim Tadlock	2013
UCF	Big 12	Rich Wallace	2024
Utah	Big 12	Gary Henderson	2022
West Virginia	Big 12	Steve Sabins	2025
Bakersfield	Big West	Jordon Banfield	2025
Cal Poly	Big West	Larry Lee	2003
Cal State Fullerton	Big West	Cory Vanderhook (interim)	2027
Cal State Northridge	Big West	Eddie Cornejo	2023
California Baptist	Big West	Gary Adcock	2004
Long Beach State	Big West	T. J. Bruce	2025
Sacramento State	Big West	Reggie Christiansen	2011
UC Irvine	Big West	Ben Orloff	2019
UC Riverside	Big West	Gregg Wallis	2027
UC San Diego	Big West	Eric Newman	2012
UC Santa Barbara	Big West	Andrew Checketts	2012
Utah Valley	Big West	Nate Rasmussen	2025
Campbell	Coastal	Chris Marx	2025
Charleston	Coastal	Chad Holbrook	2018
Elon	Coastal	Mike Kennedy	1997
Hofstra	Coastal	Frank Catalanotto	2022
Monmouth	Coastal	Dean Ehehalt	1994
North Carolina A&T	Coastal	Ben Hall	2012
Northeastern	Coastal	Mike Glavine	2015
Stony Brook	Coastal	Jim Martin	2026
Towson	Coastal	Liam Bowen	2027
UNC Wilmington	Coastal	Randy Hood	2020
William & Mary	Coastal	Rob McCoy	2025
Delaware	Conference USA	Greg Mamula	2023
FIU	Conference USA	Pedro Grifol	2027
Jacksonville State	Conference USA	Travis Creel	2027
Kennesaw State	Conference USA	Ryan Coe	2022
Liberty	Conference USA	Bradley LeCroy	2025
Middle Tennessee	Conference USA	Jerry Meyers	2023
Missouri State	Conference USA	Joey Hawkins	2025
New Mexico State	Conference USA	Jake Angier	2024
Sam Houston	Conference USA	Jay Sirianni	2020
Western Kentucky	Conference USA	Marc Rardin	2023
Milwaukee	Horizon League	Shaun Wegner	2024
Northern Illinois	Horizon League	Ryan Copeland	2024
Northern Kentucky	Horizon League	Dizzy Peyton	2022
Oakland	Horizon League	Brian Nelson	2025
Wright State	Horizon League	Alex Sogard	2019
Youngstown State	Horizon League	Trevor Charpie	2025
Brown	Ivy League	Frank Holbrook	2026
Columbia	Ivy League	Brett Boretti	2006
Cornell	Ivy League	Dan Pepicelli	2016
Dartmouth	Ivy League	Blake McFadden	2026
Harvard	Ivy League	Bill Decker	2013
Penn	Ivy League	John Yurkow	2014
Princeton	Ivy League	Ryan Forrest	2027
Yale	Ivy League	Brian Hamm	2023
Canisius	Metro	Matt Mazurek	2018
Fairfield	Metro	Bill Currier	2012
Iona	Metro	Conor Burke	2022
Manhattan	Metro	Steven Rosen	2025
Marist	Metro	Lance Ratchford	2023
Merrimack	Metro	Jeff Mejia	2027
Mount St. Mary's	Metro	Frank Leoni	2022
Niagara	Metro	Matt Spatafora	2025
Quinnipiac	Metro	John Delaney	2015
Rider	Metro	Lee Lipinski	2025
Sacred Heart	Metro	Pat Egan	2023
Saint Peter's	Metro	Joe Haumacher	2027
Siena	Metro	Alex Jurczynski	2024
Akron	Mid-American	Brian Valentine (interim)	2027
Ball State	Mid-American	Rich Maloney	2013 (Note: Maloney also served as Ball State's head coach from 1996–2002. He has held the position for a total of 21 seasons, as of the end of the 2026 season.)
Bowling Green	Mid-American	Kyle Hallock	2021
Central Michigan	Mid-American	Jake Sabol	2024
Eastern Michigan	Mid-American	Trevor Beerman	2026
Kent State	Mid-American	Jeff Duncan	2014
Miami (OH)	Mid-American	Brian Smiley	2024
Ohio	Mid-American	Andrew See	2026
Toledo	Mid-American	Rob Reinstetle	2020
UMass	Mid-American	Max Weir	2027 (Note: Weir was co-interim head coach with Brandon Shileikis for the 2026 season.)
Western Michigan	Mid-American	Billy Gernon	2011
Belmont	Missouri Valley	Dave Jarvis	1998
Bradley	Missouri Valley	Justin Dedman	2026
Evansville	Missouri Valley	Wes Carroll	2009
Illinois State	Missouri Valley	Steve Holm	2019
Indiana State	Missouri Valley	Tracy Archuleta	2025
Murray State	Missouri Valley	Dan Skirka	2019
Southern Illinois	Missouri Valley	Lance Rhodes	2020
UIC	Missouri Valley	Sean McDermott	2022
Valparaiso	Missouri Valley	Brian Schmack	2014
Air Force	Mountain West	Drew LaComb	2027
Grand Canyon	Mountain West	Steve Bieser	2027
Hawaii	Mountain West	Rich Hill	2022
Nevada	Mountain West	Jordan Getzelman	2026
New Mexico	Mountain West	Tod Brown	2022
San Jose State	Mountain West	Brad Sanfilippo	2018
UC Davis	Mountain West	Tommy Nicholson	2022
UNLV	Mountain West	Nick Garritano	2027
Utah Tech	Mountain West	Chris Pfatenhauer	2013
Central Connecticut	NEC	Pat Hall	2027
Coppin State	NEC	Sherman Reed	2011
Delaware State	NEC	Pedro Swann	2025
Fairleigh Dickinson	NEC	Manny Roman	2023
Le Moyne	NEC	Scott Cassidy	2011
LIU	NEC	Dan Pirillo	2017 (Note: Pirillo was originally hired by LIU's Brooklyn campus; before the 2019–20 school year, LIU operated separate athletic programs at its Brooklyn and Post campuses (the latter competed in NCAA Division II). The university merged its two athletic programs after the 2019 season into a single program that inherited Brooklyn's memberships in Division I and the Northeast Conference and now competes as the LIU Sharks. Pirillo was named head coach of the newly unified team.)
Maryland Eastern Shore	NEC	Justin Thomas	2027
Mercyhurst	NEC	Jimmy Latona	2024
New Haven	NEC	Chris Celano	2012
Norfolk State	NEC	Merrill Morgan	2026
Stonehill	NEC	Sean Callahan	2026
Wagner	NEC	Craig Noto	2022
Eastern Illinois	Ohio Valley	Jason Anderson	2016
Lindenwood	Ohio Valley	P. J. Finigan	2024
Little Rock	Ohio Valley	Chris Curry	2015
Morehead State	Ohio Valley	Chris Rose	2025
SIU Edwardsville	Ohio Valley	Sean Lyons	2017
Southeast Missouri State	Ohio Valley	Andy Sawyers	2017
Southern Indiana	Ohio Valley	Chris Ramirez	2025
Tennessee–Martin	Ohio Valley	Ryan Jenkins	2018
Western Illinois	Ohio Valley	Terry Davis	2024
Dallas Baptist	Pac-12	Dan Heefner	2008
Fresno State	Pac-12	Ryan Overland	2023
Gonzaga	Pac-12	Mark Machtolf	2004
Oregon State	Pac-12	Mitch Canham	2020
San Diego State	Pac-12	Kevin Vance	2026
Texas State	Pac-12	Steven Trout	2020
Washington State	Pac-12	Nathan Choate	2024
Army	Patriot League	Chris Tracz	2023
Bucknell	Patriot League	Scott Heather	2013
Holy Cross	Patriot League	Ed Kahovec	2020
Lafayette	Patriot League	A. J. Miller	2023
Lehigh	Patriot League	Sean Leary	1996
Navy	Patriot League	Chuck Ristano	2024
Alabama	Southeastern	Rob Vaughn	2024
Arkansas	Southeastern	Dave Van Horn	2003
Auburn	Southeastern	Butch Thompson	2014
Florida	Southeastern	Kevin O'Sullivan	2008
Georgia	Southeastern	Wes Johnson	2024
Kentucky	Southeastern	Nick Mingione	2017
LSU	Southeastern	Jay Johnson	2022
Mississippi State	Southeastern	Brian O'Connor	2026
Missouri	Southeastern	Kerrick Jackson	2024
Oklahoma	Southeastern	Skip Johnson	2018
Ole Miss	Southeastern	Mike Bianco	2001
South Carolina	Southeastern	Kevin Schnall	2027
Tennessee	Southeastern	Josh Elander	2026
Texas	Southeastern	Jim Schlossnagle	2025
Texas A&M	Southeastern	Michael Earley	2025
Vanderbilt	Southeastern	Tim Corbin	2003
The Citadel	Southern	Russell Triplett	2025
East Tennessee State	Southern	Joe Pennucci	2018
Mercer	Southern	Craig Gibson	2004
Samford	Southern	Tony David	2022
Tennessee Tech	Southern	Matt Bragga	2022 (Note: Bragga also served as Tennessee Tech's head coach from 2004–2018. He has held the position for a total of 20 seasons, as of the end of the 2026 season.)
UNC Greensboro	Southern	Cody Ellis	2024
VMI	Southern	Sam Roberts	2023
Western Carolina	Southern	Alan Beck	2023
Wofford	Southern	J. J. Edwards	2024
Houston Christian	Southland	Clay VanderLaan	2025
Incarnate Word	Southland	Nick Zaleski	2026
Lamar	Southland	Sean Allen	2027
McNeese	Southland	Justin Hill	2014
New Orleans	Southland	Andrew Gipson	2026
Nicholls	Southland	Brent Haring	2025
Northwestern State	Southland	Chris Bertrand	2024
Stephen F. Austin	Southland	Matt Vanderburg	2025
Southeastern Louisiana	Southland	Bobby Barbier	2024
Texas A&M-Corpus Christi	Southland	Scott Malone	2008
UTRGV	Southland	Derek Matlock	2018
Alabama A&M	Southwestern	Louis Whitlow	2025
Alabama State	Southwestern	José Vázquez	2017
Alcorn State	Southwestern	Carlton Hardy	2025
Arkansas–Pine Bluff	Southwestern	Logan Stout	2025
Bethune-Cookman	Southwestern	Jonathan Hernandez	2019
Florida A&M	Southwestern	Jamey Shouppe	2014
Grambling State	Southwestern	Davin Pierre	2022
Jackson State	Southwestern	Omar Johnson	2007
Mississippi Valley State	Southwestern	C. J. Bilbrey	2024
Prairie View A&M	Southwestern	Daniel Dulin	2026
Southern	Southwestern	Chris Crenshaw	2021
Texas Southern	Southwestern	Michael Robertson	2009
North Dakota State	Summit League	Tyler Oakes	2022
Northern Colorado	Summit League	Mike Anderson	2023
Omaha	Summit League	Rob Fournier	2027
Oral Roberts	Summit League	Ryan Folmar	2013
St. Thomas	Summit League	Chris Olean	2010
South Dakota State	Summit League	Rob Bishop	2017
Appalachian State	Sun Belt	Kermit Smith	2017
Arkansas State	Sun Belt	Mike Silva	2025
Coastal Carolina	Sun Belt	Chris Lemonis	2027
Georgia Southern	Sun Belt	Rodney Hennon	2000
Georgia State	Sun Belt	Brad Stromdahl	2020
James Madison	Sun Belt	Marlin Ikenberry	2016
Louisiana	Sun Belt	Matt Deggs	2020
Louisiana–Monroe	Sun Belt	Ford Pemberton	2026
Louisiana Tech	Sun Belt	Lane Burroughs	2017
Marshall	Sun Belt	Greg Beals	2023
Old Dominion	Sun Belt	Chris Finwood	2012
South Alabama	Sun Belt	Mark Calvi	2012
Texas State	Sun Belt	Steven Trout	2020
Troy	Sun Belt	Skylar Meade	2022
Abilene Christian	United Athletic	Rick McCarty	2019
Austin Peay	United Athletic	Roland Fanning	2023
Central Arkansas	United Athletic	Nick Harlan	2022
Eastern Kentucky	United Athletic	Jan Weisberg	2026
North Alabama	United Athletic	Jad Prachniak	2023
Tarleton	United Athletic	Fuller Smith	2024
UT Arlington	United Athletic	Mike Trapasso	2025
Utah Valley	United Athletic	Nate Rasmussen	2025
Loyola Marymount	West Coast	Donegal Fergus	2024
Pacific	West Coast	Toby DeMello	2027
Pepperdine	West Coast	Tyler LaTorre	2025
Portland	West Coast	Geoff Loomis	2016
Saint Mary's	West Coast	Eric Valenzuela	2024 (Note: The 2024 season was the first in Valenzuela's second stint with Saint Mary's, having previously served as head coach from 2014–19.)
San Diego	West Coast	Brock Ungricht	2022
San Francisco	West Coast	Rob DiToma	2023
Santa Clara	West Coast	Rusty Filter	2018
Seattle	West Coast	Donny Harrel	2009

== See also ==
- List of current NCAA Division I men's basketball coaches
- List of current NCAA Division I women's basketball coaches
- List of current NCAA Division I FBS football coaches
- List of current NCAA Division I FCS football coaches
- List of current NCAA Division I men's ice hockey coaches
- List of NCAA Division I men's soccer coaches
