= 2026 NCAA Division I baseball season =

2026 NCAA Division I season

- Duration: February 13 – June 22, 2026
- Number of teams: 304
- Preseason No. 1: UCLA

Tournament
- Duration: May 29–June 22, 2026

Men's College World Series
- Champions: Oklahoma (3rd title)
- Runners-up: North Carolina
- MOP: Jaxon Willits, Oklahoma

Seasons
- ← 2025 2027 →

The 2026 NCAA Division I baseball season was the 2026 college baseball season in the United States organized by the National Collegiate Athletic Association (NCAA) at the Division I level. It began on February 13, 2026, with play progressed through the regular season, various conference tournaments and championship series, and concluded with the 2026 NCAA Division I baseball tournament and 2026 Men's College World Series (MCWS). The MCWS consisted of the eight remaining teams in the NCAA tournament and is held annually in Omaha, Nebraska at Charles Schwab Field Omaha. The LSU Tigers were the defending champions, but failed to qualify for the NCAA tournament.

== Conference realignment ==
One school transitioned from NCAA Division II to Division I after the 2025 season.

- New Haven from the Division II Northeast-10 Conference. The school started a transition to Division I in July 2025 as a new member of the Northeast Conference.

A total of five baseball-sponsoring schools changed conferences after the 2025 season.

- Delaware and Missouri State joined Conference USA.
- Grand Canyon joined the Mountain West Conference.
- Seattle joined the West Coast Conference.
- UMass joined the Mid-American Conference.

One school dropped its program.

- Horizon League member Purdue Fort Wayne dropped baseball after the 2025 season.

One school reinstated its program.

- Atlantic 10 Conference member La Salle reinstated its baseball program for the 2026 season.

The 2026 season is the last for 22 Division I schools in their current baseball conferences, as well as the last before West Florida starts its transition from Division II to Division I. It is also Oregon State's last as a Division I independent. This does not include the three baseball-sponsoring schools of the Western Athletic Conference that will remain members when that conference rebrands as the United Athletic Conference in July 2026.

School	2026 conference	Future conference
Austin Peay	Atlantic Sun	United Athletic
California Baptist	Western Athletic	Big West
Central Arkansas	Atlantic Sun	United Athletic
Dallas Baptist	CUSA	Pac-12
Eastern Kentucky	Atlantic Sun	United Athletic
Fresno State	Mountain West	Pac-12
Gonzaga	West Coast	Pac-12
Hawaii	Big West	Mountain West
Little Rock	Ohio Valley	United Athletic
Louisiana Tech	CUSA	Sun Belt
North Alabama	Atlantic Sun	United Athletic
Northern Illinois	MAC	Horizon
Oregon State	Independent	Pac-12
Sacramento State	Western Athletic	Big West
San Diego State	Mountain West	Pac-12
Tennessee Tech	Ohio Valley	Southern
Texas State	Sun Belt	Pac-12
UC Davis	Big West	Mountain West
Utah Tech	Western Athletic	Mountain West
Utah Valley	Western Athletic	Big West
Washington State	Mountain West	Pac-12
West Florida	Gulf South (D-II)	Atlantic Sun
West Georgia	Atlantic Sun	United Athletic

== Other news ==
- April 14 – Lehigh set a new Division I record for first-inning runs, scoring 20 against Coppin State on its way to a 38–6 win. The Mountain Hawks surpassed the previous record of 18 first-inning runs first set by Princeton in March 1974 and tied by Air Force the next month. Lehigh fell short of the record for runs in any inning, set the previous season by George Mason with 23 in the second inning against Holy Cross. Lehigh's 38 runs set a new single-game Patriot League record, and Mountain Hawks third baseman Aidan Quinn set a new Division I record by drawing 7 walks.
- May 27 – The Metro Atlantic Athletic Conference announced that it would adopt the new name of Metro Conference starting that July 1.

== Season outlook ==
Perfect Game
Ranking	Team
1	LSU
2	Georgia Tech
3	Tennessee
4	Arkansas
5	UCLA
6	Mississippi State
7	Oregon State
8	Texas
9	Florida State
10	Auburn
11	TCU
12	Florida
13	Oregon
14	Virginia
15	Georgia
16	Louisville
17	Coastal Carolina
18	North Carolina
19	Vanderbilt
20	Clemson
21	UC Santa Barbara
22	NC State
23	Southern Miss
24	Miami (FL)
25	East Carolina

D1Baseball
Ranking	Team
1	UCLA
2	LSU
3	Texas
4	Mississippi State
5	Georgia Tech
6	Coastal Carolina
7	Arkansas
8	Louisville
9	Auburn
10	TCU
11	North Carolina
12	Oregon State
13	Florida
14	Tennessee
15	Georgia
16	Florida State
17	NC State
18	Kentucky
19	Clemson
20	Southern Miss
21	Wake Forest
22	Miami (FL)
23	Vanderbilt
24	Arizona
25	Texas A&M

USA Today Coaches
Ranking	Team
1	LSU
2	UCLA
3	Texas
4	Georgia Tech
5	Arkansas
6	Mississippi State
7	Coastal Carolina
8	North Carolina
9	Auburn
10	TCU
11	Louisville
12	Oregon State
13	Georgia
14	Florida State
15	Tennessee
16	Florida
17	Clemson
18	Vanderbilt
19	NC State
20	Southern Miss
21	Miami (FL)
22	Virginia
23	Oregon
24	Arizona
25	Wake Forest

Baseball America
Ranking	Team
1	UCLA
2	LSU
3	Mississippi State
4	Georgia Tech
5	Auburn
6	Georgia
7	North Carolina
8	Texas
9	TCU
10	Arkansas
11	Coastal Carolina
12	Florida State
13	Tennessee
14	Virginia
15	Oregon State
16	Ole Miss
17	Vanderbilt
18	Louisville
19	Oklahoma
20	Clemson
21	West Virginia
22	Florida
23	Southern Miss
24	East Carolina
25	Miami (FL)

NCBWA
Ranking	Team
1	LSU
2	UCLA
3	Texas
4	Georgia Tech
5	Arkansas
6	Mississippi State
7	Coastal Carolina
8	Auburn
9	TCU
10	Louisville
11	Oregon State
12	North Carolina
13	Georgia
14	Florida State
15	Tennessee
16	Florida
17	Clemson
18	Vanderbilt
19	NC State
20	Southern Miss
21	Kentucky
22	Miami (FL)
23	Arizona
24	Virginia
25	Wake Forest

== Conference standings ==
2026 America East Conference baseball standings
	Conf.						Overall
Team	W		L		T	PCT	W		L		T	PCT
Binghamton ‍†‍‡‍^{y}	17	–	7	–	0	.708	28	–	20	–	0	.583
UMBC ‍‍‍	15	–	9	–	0	.625	28	–	22	–	0	.560
Maine ‍‍‍	14	–	10	–	0	.583	20	–	30	–	0	.400
Bryant ‍‍‍	13	–	11	–	0	.542	27	–	24	–	0	.529
UMass Lowell ‍‍‍	10	–	14	–	0	.417	20	–	29	–	0	.408
Albany ‍‍‍	9	–	15	–	0	.375	15	–	33	–	0	.313
NJIT ‍‍‍	6	–	18	–	0	.250	16	–	31	–	1	.344
† – Conference champion ‡ – Tournament champion y – Invited to the NCAA tournament As of May 17, 2026; Rankings from D1Baseball

2026 American Conference baseball standings
	Conf.						Overall
Team	W		L		T	PCT	W		L		T	PCT
UTSA ‍†‍‍	17	–	10	–	0	.630	38	–	20	–	0	.655
East Carolina ‍†‍‡‍^{y}	17	–	10	–	0	.630	36	–	22	–	1	.619
Rice ‍‍‍	16	–	11	–	0	.593	35	–	24	–	0	.593
UAB ‍‍‍	15	–	12	–	0	.556	32	–	26	–	0	.552
Memphis ‍‍‍	13	–	14	–	0	.481	24	–	34	–	0	.414
Florida Atlantic ‍‍‍	12	–	15	–	0	.444	28	–	28	–	0	.500
Wichita State ‍‍‍	12	–	15	–	0	.444	31	–	29	–	0	.517
Charlotte ‍‍‍	12	–	15	–	0	.444	28	–	28	–	0	.500
South Florida ‍‍‍	11	–	16	–	0	.407	32	–	21	–	0	.604
Tulane ‍‍‍	10	–	17	–	0	.370	25	–	31	–	0	.446
† – Conference champion ‡ – Tournament champion y – Invited to the NCAA tournament As of May 26, 2026; Rankings from D1Baseball

2026 Atlantic 10 Conference baseball standings
	Conf.						Overall
Team	W		L		T	PCT	W		L		T	PCT
Saint Joseph's ‍†‍‍	25	–	5	–	0	.833	35	–	18	–	0	.660
Richmond ‍‍‍	20	–	10	–	0	.667	33	–	22	–	0	.600
VCU ‍‍‡‍^{y}	20	–	10	–	0	.667	37	–	23	–	0	.617
George Mason ‍‍‍	18	–	12	–	0	.600	28	–	24	–	0	.538
Davidson ‍‍‍	16	–	14	–	0	.533	25	–	26	–	0	.490
Rhode Island ‍‍‍	16	–	14	–	0	.533	23	–	29	–	0	.442
Dayton ‍‍‍	15	–	15	–	0	.500	31	–	23	–	0	.574
Fordham ‍‍‍	15	–	15	–	0	.500	25	–	30	–	0	.455
Saint Louis ‍‍‍	11	–	19	–	0	.367	20	–	34	–	0	.370
George Washington ‍‍‍	9	–	21	–	0	.300	18	–	35	–	0	.340
La Salle ‍‍‍	8	–	22	–	0	.267	24	–	31	–	0	.436
St. Bonaventure ‍‍‍	7	–	23	–	0	.233	13	–	36	–	1	.270
† – Conference champion ‡ – Tournament champion y – Invited to the NCAA tournament As of May 17, 2026; Rankings from D1Baseball

2026 Atlantic Coast Conference baseball standings
	Conf.						Overall
Team	W		L		T	PCT	W		L		T	PCT
No. 10 Georgia Tech ‍†‍‡‍^{y}	25	–	5	–	0	.833	50	–	11	–	0	.820
No. 2 North Carolina ‍‍‍^{y}	22	–	8	–	0	.733	54	–	14	–	1	.790
No. 18 Florida State ‍‍‍^{y}	19	–	11	–	0	.633	40	–	19	–	0	.678
Boston College ‍‍‍^{y}	17	–	13	–	0	.567	40	–	24	–	0	.625
Wake Forest ‍‍‍^{y}	16	–	14	–	0	.533	39	–	21	–	0	.650
Miami (FL) ‍‍‍^{y}	16	–	14	–	0	.533	39	–	20	–	0	.661
Virginia Tech ‍‍‍^{y}	15	–	15	–	0	.500	30	–	26	–	0	.536
Virginia ‍‍‍^{y}	14	–	16	–	0	.467	37	–	23	–	0	.617
NC State ‍‍‍^{y}	14	–	16	–	0	.467	32	–	24	–	0	.571
Louisville ‍‍‍	13	–	17	–	0	.433	30	–	27	–	0	.526
Notre Dame ‍‍‍	13	–	17	–	0	.433	31	–	22	–	0	.585
Stanford ‍‍‍	13	–	17	–	0	.433	28	–	26	–	0	.519
California ‍‍‍	12	–	18	–	0	.400	29	–	26	–	0	.527
Pittsburgh ‍‍‍	11	–	19	–	0	.367	33	–	24	–	0	.579
Clemson ‍‍‍	10	–	20	–	0	.333	31	–	26	–	0	.544
Duke ‍‍‍	10	–	20	–	0	.333	26	–	31	–	0	.456
† – Conference champion ‡ – Tournament champion y – Invited to the NCAA Tournament; As of June 23, 2026; Rankings from D1Baseball

2026 ASUN Conference baseball standings
	Conf.				Overall
Team	W		L	PCT	W		L	PCT
Gold
Lipscomb ^{x}‍‍‡‍^{y}	19	–	11	.633	26	–	24	.520
North Alabama ^{x}‍‍‍	19	–	11	.633	28	–	26	.519
Central Arkansas ‍‍‍	17	–	13	.567	30	–	25	.545
Austin Peay ‍‍‍	14	–	16	.467	24	–	31	.436
Bellarmine ‍‍‍	11	–	18	.379	19	–	33	.365
Eastern Kentucky ‍‍‍	9	–	20	.310	16	–	37	.302
Graphite
North Florida ^{x}‍‍‍	22	–	8	.733	31	–	22	.585
Florida Gulf Coast ‍‍‍	17	–	12	.586	34	–	20	.630
Jacksonville ‍‍‍	16	–	14	.533	30	–	24	.556
Stetson ‍‍‍	13	–	16	.448	23	–	31	.426
Queens ‍‍‍	11	–	19	.367	16	–	38	.296
West Georgia* ‍‍‍	10	–	20	.333	13	–	41	.241
* Ineligible for the 2026 NCAA tournament due to transition from Division II
x – Division champion ‡ – Tournament champion y – Invited to the NCAA tournament As of May 17, 2026; Rankings from D1Baseball

2026 Big 12 Conference baseball standings
	Conf.				Overall
Team	W		L	PCT	W		L	PCT
No. 12 Kansas ‍†‍‡‍^{y}	22	–	8	.733	45	–	16	.738
No. 4 West Virginia ‍‍‍^{y}	21	–	9	.700	47	–	17	.734
Arizona State ‍‍‍^{y}	19	–	11	.633	39	–	21	.650
UCF ‍‍‍^{y}	19	–	11	.633	32	–	23	.582
No. 25 Oklahoma State ‍‍‍^{y}	18	–	12	.600	39	–	22	.639
Cincinnati ‍‍‍^{y}	17	–	13	.567	38	–	22	.633
TCU ‍‍‍	17	–	13	.567	33	–	21	.611
Baylor ‍‍‍	14	–	16	.467	30	–	27	.526
BYU ‍‍‍	14	–	16	.467	28	–	29	.491
Utah ‍‍‍	12	–	18	.400	26	–	25	.510
Kansas State ‍‍‍	11	–	19	.367	30	–	27	.526
Texas Tech ‍‍‍	10	–	20	.333	27	–	28	.491
Arizona ‍‍‍	9	–	21	.300	19	–	34	.358
Houston ‍‍‍	7	–	23	.233	24	–	31	.436
† – Conference champion ‡ – Tournament champion y – Invited to the NCAA tournament As of May 20, 2026; Rankings from D1baseball

2026 Big East Conference baseball standings
	Conf.				Overall
Team	W		L	PCT	W		L	PCT
No. 20 St. John's ‍†‍‡‍^{y}	15	–	6	.714	36	–	26	.581
UConn ‍†‍‍	15	–	6	.714	32	–	26	.552
Xavier ‍†‍‍	15	–	6	.714	28	–	30	.483
Creighton ‍‍‍	13	–	8	.619	31	–	26	.544
Georgetown ‍‍‍	9	–	12	.429	28	–	28	.500
Butler ‍‍‍	9	–	12	.429	20	–	34	.370
Villanova ‍‍‍	5	–	16	.238	19	–	30	.388
Seton Hall ‍‍‍	3	–	18	.143	16	–	30	.348
† – Conference champion ‡ – Tournament champion y – Invited to the NCAA tournament As of June 30, 2026; Rankings from D1Baseball

2026 Big South Conference baseball standings
	Conf.				Overall
Team	W		L	PCT	W		L	PCT
High Point ‍†‍‍	17	–	7	.708	36	–	18	.667
Winthrop ‍‍‍	15	–	9	.625	33	–	22	.600
USC Upstate ‍‍‡‍^{y}	13	–	11	.542	29	–	27	.518
Charleston Southern ‍‍‍	13	–	11	.542	29	–	21	.580
Radford ‍‍‍	12	–	12	.500	25	–	24	.510
Longwood ‍‍‍	11	–	13	.458	29	–	25	.537
Gardner–Webb ‍‍‍	10	–	14	.417	25	–	30	.455
UNC Asheville ‍‍‍	9	–	15	.375	21	–	34	.382
Presbyterian ‍‍‍	8	–	16	.333	12	–	44	.214
† – Conference champion ‡ – Tournament champion y – Invited to the NCAA Tournament; As of May 17, 2026; Rankings from D1Baseball

2026 Big Ten Conference baseball standings
	Conf.						Overall
Team	W		L		T	PCT	W		L		T	PCT
No. 11 UCLA ‍†‍‡‍^{y}	28	–	2	–	0	.933	48	–	6	–	0	.889
Nebraska ‍‍‍^{y}	23	–	7	–	0	.767	41	–	14	–	0	.745
No. 13 Oregon ‍‍‍^{y}	20	–	10	–	0	.667	38	–	15	–	0	.717
No. 15 USC ‍‍‍^{y}	20	–	10	–	0	.667	42	–	14	–	0	.750
Purdue ‍‍‍	18	–	13	–	0	.581	36	–	18	–	0	.667
Ohio State ‍‍‍	18	–	12	–	0	.600	29	–	24	–	0	.547
Michigan ‍‍‍	17	–	13	–	0	.567	33	–	22	–	0	.600
Iowa ‍‍‍	15	–	15	–	0	.500	30	–	21	–	0	.588
Illinois ‍‍‍	14	–	16	–	0	.467	27	–	27	–	0	.500
Rutgers ‍‍‍	13	–	17	–	0	.433	26	–	29	–	0	.473
Washington ‍‍‍	12	–	18	–	0	.400	23	–	31	–	0	.426
Michigan State ‍‍‍	12	–	19	–	0	.387	22	–	31	–	0	.415
Minnesota ‍‍‍	11	–	19	–	0	.367	30	–	23	–	0	.566
Maryland ‍‍‍	9	–	21	–	0	.300	27	–	29	–	0	.482
Indiana ‍‍‍	9	–	21	–	0	.300	23	–	31	–	0	.426
Penn State ‍‍‍	9	–	21	–	0	.300	16	–	35	–	0	.314
Northwestern ‍‍‍	8	–	22	–	0	.267	21	–	30	–	1	.413
† – Conference champion ‡ – Tournament champion y – Invited to the NCAA tournament As of May 19, 2026; Rankings from D1Baseball

2026 Big West Conference baseball standings
	Conf.				Overall
Team	W		L	PCT	W		L	PCT
UC Santa Barbara ‍†‍‍^{y}	22	–	8	.733	40	–	20	.667
No. 19 Cal Poly ‍‍‡‍^{y}	22	–	8	.733	39	–	24	.619
UC San Diego ‍‍‍	18	–	12	.600	27	–	28	.491
Hawai'i ‍‍‍	16	–	14	.533	27	–	23	.540
Cal State Fullerton ‍‍‍	15	–	15	.500	24	–	32	.429
UC Irvine ‍‍‍	14	–	16	.467	25	–	27	.481
UC Davis ‍‍‍	14	–	16	.467	26	–	28	.481
Cal State Northridge ‍‍‍	12	–	18	.400	25	–	28	.472
Cal State Bakersfield ‍‍‍	11	–	19	.367	21	–	32	.396
Long Beach State ‍‍‍	11	–	19	.367	17	–	35	.327
UC Riverside ‍‍‍	10	–	20	.333	15	–	37	.288
† – Conference champion ‡ – Tournament champion y – Invited to the NCAA tournament As of June 6, 2026; Rankings from D1Baseball

2026 Coastal Athletic Association baseball standings
	Conf.				Overall
Team	W		L	PCT	W		L	PCT
Campbell ‍†‍‍	26	–	4	.867	39	–	15	.722
Northeastern ‍‍‡‍^{y}	22	–	8	.733	34	–	19	.642
Monmouth ‍‍‍	20	–	10	.667	29	–	21	.580
Charleston ‍‍‍	18	–	12	.600	28	–	26	.519
UNC Wilmington ‍‍‍	16	–	14	.533	28	–	26	.519
Hofstra ‍‍‍	14	–	16	.467	20	–	27	.426
Stony Brook ‍‍‍	13	–	17	.433	21	–	30	.412
William & Mary ‍‍‍	12	–	18	.400	21	–	32	.396
Elon ‍‍‍	10	–	20	.333	20	–	33	.377
Towson ‍‍‍	9	–	21	.300	22	–	32	.407
North Carolina A&T ‍‍‍	5	–	25	.167	14	–	38	.269
† – Conference champion ‡ – Tournament champion y – Invited to the NCAA Tournament; As of May 17, 2026; Rankings from D1Baseball

2026 Conference USA baseball standings
	Conf.				Overall
Team	W		L	PCT	W		L	PCT
Jacksonville State ‍†‍‡‍^{y}	23	–	7	.767	42	–	13	.764
Liberty ‍‍‍^{y}	21	–	9	.700	38	–	18	.679
Missouri State ‍‍‍^{y}	20	–	10	.667	32	–	18	.640
Dallas Baptist ‍‍‍	19	–	11	.633	31	–	24	.564
Louisiana Tech ‍‍‍	19	–	11	.633	33	–	23	.589
Western Kentucky ‍‍‍	14	–	16	.467	29	–	26	.527
Kennesaw State ‍‍‍	13	–	17	.433	25	–	26	.490
Sam Houston ‍‍‍	13	–	17	.433	24	–	32	.429
Middle Tennessee ‍‍‍	12	–	18	.400	26	–	29	.473
FIU ‍‍‍	10	–	20	.333	19	–	35	.352
New Mexico State ‍‍‍	9	–	21	.300	18	–	34	.346
Delaware ‍‍‍	7	–	23	.233	19	–	35	.352
† – Conference champion ‡ – Tournament champion y – Invited to the NCAA Tournament; As of May 17, 2026; Rankings from D1Baseball

2026 Horizon League baseball standings
	Conf.				Overall
Team	W		L	PCT	W		L	PCT
Wright State ‍†‍‍	17	–	7	.708	25	–	26	.490
Milwaukee ‍‍‡‍^{y}	14	–	10	.583	22	–	31	.415
Northern Kentucky ‍‍‍	12	–	12	.500	24	–	28	.462
Youngstown State ‍‍‍	12	–	12	.500	15	–	38	.283
Oakland ‍‍‍	5	–	19	.208	10	–	40	.200
† – Conference champion ‡ – Tournament champion y – Invited to the NCAA Tournament; As of May 17, 2026; Rankings from D1Baseball

2026 NCAA Division I baseball independents standings
	Conf.				Overall
Team	W		L	PCT	W		L	PCT
No. 22 Oregon State ‍‍‍^{y}	0	–	0	–	43	–	12	.782
As of May 16, 2026; Rankings from D1Baseball

2026 Ivy League baseball standings
	Conf.						Overall
Team	W		L		T	PCT	W		L		T	PCT
Yale ‍†‍‡‍^{y}	14	–	6	–	1	.690	30	–	13	–	1	.693
Penn ‍‍‍	14	–	7	–	0	.667	20	–	22	–	0	.476
Brown ‍‍‍	13	–	8	–	0	.619	23	–	20	–	0	.535
Columbia ‍‍‍	10	–	10	–	1	.500	16	–	25	–	1	.393
Harvard ‍‍‍	9	–	12	–	0	.429	11	–	26	–	0	.297
Princeton ‍‍‍	9	–	13	–	0	.409	15	–	27	–	0	.357
Cornell ‍‍‍	8	–	13	–	0	.381	11	–	26	–	0	.297
Dartmouth ‍‍‍	8	–	15	–	0	.348	15	–	25	–	0	.375
† – Conference champion ‡ – Tournament champion y – Invited to the NCAA Tournament; As of May 17, 2026; Rankings from D1Baseball

2026 Metro Atlantic Athletic Conference baseball standings
	Conf.						Overall
Team	W		L		T	PCT	W		L		T	PCT
Rider ‍†‍‡‍^{y}	22	–	8	–	0	.733	30	–	17	–	0	.638
Niagara ‍‍‍	20	–	10	–	0	.667	26	–	19	–	1	.576
Fairfield ‍‍‍	20	–	10	–	0	.667	27	–	21	–	0	.563
Merrimack ‍‍‍	20	–	10	–	0	.667	26	–	27	–	0	.491
Canisius ‍‍‍	17	–	13	–	0	.567	21	–	24	–	0	.467
Marist ‍‍‍	17	–	13	–	0	.567	23	–	28	–	0	.451
Iona ‍‍‍	15	–	14	–	0	.517	19	–	28	–	0	.404
Quinnipiac ‍‍‍	14	–	16	–	0	.467	23	–	28	–	0	.451
Sacred Heart ‍‍‍	13	–	16	–	0	.448	17	–	32	–	0	.347
Mount St. Mary's ‍‍‍	13	–	17	–	0	.433	22	–	26	–	0	.458
Siena ‍‍‍	12	–	18	–	0	.400	20	–	30	–	0	.400
Manhattan ‍‍‍	10	–	20	–	0	.333	20	–	31	–	0	.392
Saint Peter's ‍‍‍	1	–	29	–	0	.033	5	–	47	–	0	.096
† – Conference champion ‡ – Tournament champion y – Invited to the NCAA Tournament; As of May 16, 2026; Rankings from D1Baseball

2026 Mid-American Conference baseball standings
	Conf.				Overall
Team	W		L	PCT	W		L	PCT
Miami (OH) ‍†‍‍	25	–	8	.758	38	–	15	.717
Kent State ‍‍‍	24	–	9	.727	39	–	13	.750
Toledo ‍‍‍	21	–	12	.636	29	–	27	.518
Northern Illinois ‍‍‡‍^{y}	21	–	12	.636	31	–	17	.646
Western Michigan ‍‍‍	20	–	13	.606	26	–	23	.531
Ball State ‍‍‍	18	–	15	.545	23	–	28	.451
Central Michigan ‍‍‍	13	–	10	.565	22	–	29	.431
UMass ‍‍‍	13	–	20	.394	18	–	29	.383
Eastern Michigan ‍‍‍	12	–	21	.364	19	–	34	.358
Bowling Green ‍‍‍	12	–	21	.364	17	–	34	.333
Akron ‍‍‍	11	–	22	.333	20	–	34	.370
Ohio ‍‍‍	8	–	25	.242	11	–	43	.204
† – Conference champion ‡ – Tournament champion y – Invited to the NCAA Tournament; As of May 17, 2026; Rankings from D1Baseball

2026 Missouri Valley Conference baseball standings
	Conf.						Overall
Team	W		L		T	PCT	W		L		T	PCT
UIC ‍†‍‡‍^{y}	16	–	8	–	0	.667	24	–	27	–	1	.471
Indiana State ‍‍‍	15	–	9	–	0	.625	30	–	25	–	0	.545
Murray State ‍‍‍	15	–	9	–	0	.625	30	–	25	–	0	.545
Southern Illinois ‍‍‍	14	–	10	–	0	.583	23	–	30	–	0	.434
Evansville ‍‍‍	13	–	11	–	0	.542	20	–	31	–	0	.392
Illinois State ‍‍‍	13	–	11	–	0	.542	33	–	22	–	0	.600
Belmont ‍‍‍	11	–	13	–	0	.458	21	–	34	–	0	.382
Bradley ‍‍‍	6	–	18	–	0	.250	11	–	45	–	0	.196
Valparaiso ‍‍‍	5	–	19	–	0	.208	12	–	38	–	0	.240
† – Conference champion ‡ – Tournament champion y – Invited to the NCAA Tournament; As of May 17, 2026; Rankings from D1Baseball

2026 Mountain West Conference baseball standings
	Conf.						Overall
Team	W		L		T	PCT	W		L		T	PCT
San Diego State ‍†‍‍	16	–	8	–	0	.667	36	–	24	–	0	.600
Washington State ‍‍‡‍^{y}	15	–	9	–	0	.625	31	–	28	–	0	.525
Air Force ‍‍‍	15	–	9	–	0	.625	27	–	28	–	0	.491
Nevada ‍‍‍	13	–	11	–	0	.542	24	–	27	–	0	.471
New Mexico ‍‍‍	12	–	11	–	1	.521	29	–	24	–	1	.546
UNLV ‍‍‍	11	–	13	–	0	.458	30	–	25	–	0	.545
San Jose State ‍‍‍	11	–	13	–	0	.458	24	–	27	–	0	.471
Grand Canyon ‍‍‍	11	–	13	–	0	.458	21	–	30	–	0	.412
Fresno State ‍‍‍	3	–	20	–	1	.146	14	–	38	–	1	.274
† – Conference champion ‡ – Tournament champion y – Invited to the NCAA Tournament; As of May 16, 2026; Rankings from D1Baseball

2026 Northeast Conference baseball standings
	Conf.						Overall
Team	W		L		T	PCT	W		L		T	PCT
LIU ‍†‍‡‍^{y}	26	–	7	–	0	.788	27	–	20	–	0	.574
Fairleigh Dickinson ‍‍‍	25	–	8	–	0	.758	32	–	18	–	1	.637
Wagner ‍‍‍	23	–	10	–	0	.697	28	–	22	–	0	.560
Le Moyne* ‍‍‍	22	–	11	–	0	.667	22	–	24	–	0	.478
Stonehill ‍‍‍	17	–	13	–	0	.567	21	–	28	–	0	.429
Norfolk State ‍‍‍	16	–	17	–	0	.485	19	–	31	–	0	.380
Mercyhurst* ‍‍‍	14	–	19	–	0	.424	15	–	32	–	0	.319
New Haven* ‍‍‍	12	–	18	–	0	.400	12	–	33	–	0	.267
Central Connecticut ‍‍‍	13	–	20	–	0	.394	17	–	27	–	0	.386
Coppin State ‍‍‍	11	–	22	–	0	.333	11	–	37	–	0	.229
Maryland Eastern Shore ‍‍‍	8	–	25	–	0	.242	9	–	39	–	0	.188
Delaware State ‍‍‍	8	–	25	–	0	.242	8	–	42	–	0	.160
* Ineligible for the 2026 NCAA tournament due to transition from Division II
† – Conference champion ‡ – Tournament champion y – Invited to the NCAA Tournament; As of May 16, 2026; Rankings from D1Baseball

2026 Ohio Valley Conference baseball standings
	Conf.				Overall
Team	W		L	PCT	W		L	PCT
SIU Edwardsville ‍†‍‍	19	–	7	.731	32	–	22	.593
Eastern Illinois ‍‍‍	18	–	9	.667	31	–	19	.620
Southeast Missouri State ‍‍‍	18	–	9	.667	38	–	16	.704
No. 21 Little Rock ‍‍‡‍^{y}	16	–	11	.593	30	–	25	.545
Morehead State ‍‍‍	15	–	12	.556	31	–	24	.564
Lindenwood ‍‍‍	13	–	14	.481	29	–	26	.527
UT Martin ‍‍‍	11	–	15	.423	25	–	29	.463
Southern Indiana ‍‍‍	10	–	17	.370	28	–	27	.509
Western Illinois ‍‍‍	8	–	19	.296	16	–	36	.308
Tennessee Tech ‍‍‍	6	–	21	.222	18	–	37	.327
† – Conference champion ‡ – Tournament champion y – Invited to the NCAA Tournament; As of May 17, 2026; Rankings from D1Baseball

2026 Patriot League baseball standings
	Conf.				Overall
Team	W		L	PCT	W		L	PCT
Army ‍†‍‍	17	–	9	.654	28	–	20	.583
Bucknell ‍†‍‍	17	–	9	.654	28	–	23	.549
Navy ‍‍‍	16	–	10	.615	30	–	19	.612
Holy Cross ‍‍‡‍^{y}	13	–	13	.500	25	–	28	.472
Lehigh ‍‍‍	8	–	18	.308	14	–	31	.311
Lafayette ‍‍‍	7	–	19	.269	12	–	33	.267
† – Conference champion ‡ – Tournament champion y – Invited to the NCAA Tournament; As of May 20, 2026; Rankings from D1Baseball

2026 Southeastern Conference baseball standings
	Conf.				Overall
Team	W		L	PCT	W		L	PCT
No. 3 Georgia ‍†‍‡‍^{y}	23	–	7	.767	53	–	14	.791
No. 5 Texas ‍‍‍^{y}	19	–	10	.655	46	–	15	.754
No. 17 Texas A&M ‍‍‍^{y}	18	–	11	.621	41	–	16	.719
No. 6 Alabama ‍‍‍^{y}	18	–	12	.600	42	–	21	.667
No. 16 Florida ‍‍‍^{y}	18	–	12	.600	41	–	21	.661
No. 9 Auburn ‍‍‍^{y}	17	–	13	.567	42	–	22	.656
No. 23 Arkansas ‍‍‍^{y}	17	–	13	.567	41	–	22	.651
No. 14 Mississippi State ‍‍‍^{y}	16	–	14	.533	43	–	19	.694
No. 7 Ole Miss ‍‍‍^{y}	15	–	15	.500	41	–	23	.641
Tennessee ‍‍‍^{y}	15	–	15	.500	38	–	22	.633
No. 1 Oklahoma ‍‍‍^{y}	14	–	16	.467	43	–	23	.652
Vanderbilt ‍‍‍	14	–	16	.467	33	–	25	.569
Kentucky ‍‍‍^{y}	13	–	17	.433	33	–	23	.589
LSU ‍‍‍	9	–	21	.300	30	–	28	.517
South Carolina ‍‍‍	7	–	23	.233	22	–	35	.386
Missouri ‍‍‍	6	–	24	.200	24	–	31	.436
† – Conference champion ‡ – Tournament champion y – Invited to the NCAA Tournament; As of June 22, 2026; Rankings from D1Baseball

2026 Southern Conference baseball standings
	Conf.				Overall
Team	W		L	PCT	W		L	PCT
Mercer ‍†‍‍	15	–	6	.714	44	–	15	.746
Western Carolina ‍‍‍	14	–	7	.667	36	–	23	.610
Samford ‍‍‍	12	–	9	.571	31	–	25	.554
Wofford ‍‍‍	12	–	9	.571	34	–	22	.607
The Citadel ‍‍‡‍^{y}	11	–	10	.524	36	–	26	.581
East Tennessee State ‍‍‍	10	–	11	.476	30	–	23	.566
UNC Greensboro ‍‍‍	7	–	14	.333	23	–	33	.411
VMI ‍‍‍	3	–	18	.143	28	–	27	.509
† – Conference champion ‡ – Tournament champion y – Invited to the NCAA tournament As of May 31, 2026; Rankings from D1Baseball

2026 Southland Conference baseball standings
	Conf.				Overall
Team	W		L	PCT	W		L	PCT
Southeastern Louisiana ‍†‍‍	19	–	9	.679	34	–	21	.618
Lamar ‍‍‡‍^{y}	19	–	11	.633	34	–	25	.576
UT Rio Grande Valley ‍‍‍	17	–	13	.567	26	–	29	.473
Nicholls ‍‍‍	15	–	13	.536	21	–	26	.447
McNeese ‍‍‍	16	–	14	.533	31	–	26	.544
Northwestern State ‍‍‍	16	–	14	.533	26	–	26	.500
Stephen F. Austin ‍‍‍	15	–	15	.500	29	–	27	.518
Houston Christian ‍‍‍	13	–	17	.433	24	–	29	.453
New Orleans ‍‍‍	13	–	17	.433	24	–	30	.444
Texas A&M–Corpus Christi ‍‍‍	11	–	19	.367	23	–	28	.451
Incarnate Word ‍‍‍	9	–	21	.300	19	–	29	.396
† – Conference champion ‡ – Tournament champion y – Invited to the NCAA Tournament; As of May 22, 2026; Rankings from D1Baseball

2026 Southwestern Athletic Conference baseball standings
	Conf.				Overall
Team	W		L	PCT	W		L	PCT
Bethune–Cookman ‍†‍‍	23	–	7	.767	37	–	18	.673
Southern ‍‍‍	20	–	7	.741	23	–	22	.511
Florida A&M ‍‍‍	22	–	8	.733	28	–	22	.560
Alabama State ‍‍‡‍^{y}	20	–	10	.667	30	–	21	.588
Grambling State ‍‍‍	18	–	12	.600	21	–	29	.420
Texas Southern ‍‍‍	15	–	12	.556	19	–	22	.463
Jackson State ‍‍‍	16	–	14	.533	23	–	25	.479
Arkansas–Pine Bluff ‍‍‍	16	–	14	.533	22	–	32	.407
Prairie View A&M ‍‍‍	10	–	18	.357	12	–	35	.255
Mississippi Valley State ‍‍‍	8	–	22	.267	12	–	36	.250
Alabama A&M ‍‍‍	5	–	25	.167	8	–	43	.157
Alcorn State ‍‍‍	3	–	25	.107	4	–	42	.087
† – Conference champion ‡ – Tournament champion y – Invited to the NCAA Tournament; As of May 17, 2026; Rankings from D1Baseball

2026 Summit League baseball standings
	Conf.				Overall
Team	W		L	PCT	W		L	PCT
Oral Roberts ‍†‍‍	22	–	6	.786	35	–	24	.593
Omaha ‍‍‍	16	–	11	.593	21	–	26	.447
Northern Colorado ‍‍‍	13	–	15	.464	17	–	38	.309
South Dakota State ‍‍‡‍^{y}	12	–	15	.444	24	–	31	.436
North Dakota State ‍‍‍	9	–	16	.360	13	–	32	.289
St. Thomas ‍‍‍	9	–	18	.333	12	–	38	.240
† – Conference champion ‡ – Tournament champion y – Invited to the NCAA Tournament; As of May 23, 2026; Rankings from D1Baseball

2026 Sun Belt Conference baseball standings
	Conf.				Overall
Team	W		L	PCT	W		L	PCT
No. 24 Southern Miss ‍†‍‡‍^{y}	22	–	8	.733	40	–	14	.741
Coastal Carolina ‍‍‍^{y}	21	–	9	.700	36	–	19	.655
Appalachian State ‍‍‍	17	–	13	.567	30	–	22	.577
No. 8 Troy ‍‍‍^{y}	17	–	13	.567	29	–	27	.518
South Alabama ‍‍‍	17	–	13	.567	33	–	21	.611
Texas State ‍‍‍^{y}	16	–	14	.533	34	–	22	.607
Louisiana ‍‍‍^{y}	16	–	14	.533	34	–	21	.618
Old Dominion ‍‍‍	15	–	15	.500	29	–	25	.537
Georgia State ‍‍‍	14	–	16	.467	26	–	28	.481
Marshall ‍‍‍	13	–	17	.433	23	–	31	.426
Arkansas State ‍‍‍	12	–	18	.400	29	–	24	.547
Louisiana–Monroe ‍‍‍	12	–	18	.400	27	–	28	.491
James Madison ‍‍‍	11	–	19	.367	21	–	32	.396
Georgia Southern ‍‍‍	7	–	23	.233	16	–	40	.286
† – Conference champion ‡ – Tournament champion y – Invited to the NCAA Tournament; As of May 17, 2026; Rankings from D1Baseball

2026 West Coast Conference baseball standings
	Conf.						Overall
Team	W		L		T	PCT	W		L		T	PCT
Gonzaga ‍†‍‍	22	–	5	–	0	.815	35	–	17	–	0	.673
Pacific ‍‍‍	15	–	11	–	1	.574	23	–	28	–	1	.452
San Francisco ‍‍‍	15	–	12	–	0	.556	24	–	28	–	0	.462
Pepperdine ‍‍‍	15	–	12	–	0	.556	21	–	32	–	0	.396
Saint Mary's ‍‍‡‍^{y}	15	–	12	–	0	.556	30	–	24	–	0	.556
Santa Clara ‍‍‍	13	–	14	–	0	.481	25	–	28	–	0	.472
Portland ‍‍‍	13	–	14	–	0	.481	27	–	25	–	0	.519
San Diego ‍‍‍	12	–	14	–	1	.463	20	–	30	–	1	.402
Seattle ‍‍‍	11	–	16	–	0	.407	17	–	31	–	0	.354
Loyola Marymount ‍‍‍	3	–	24	–	0	.111	12	–	44	–	0	.214
† – Conference champion ‡ – Tournament champion y – Invited to the NCAA Tournament; As of May 17, 2026; Rankings from D1Baseball

2026 Western Athletic Conference baseball standings
	Conf.				Overall
Team	W		L	PCT	W		L	PCT
Tarleton ‍†‍‡‍^{y}	12	–	6	.667	34	–	19	.642
California Baptist ‍‍‍	11	–	7	.611	43	–	13	.768
Utah Tech ‍‍‍	10	–	8	.556	31	–	21	.596
Sacramento State ‍‍‍	10	–	8	.556	26	–	30	.464
Abilene Christian ‍‍‍	8	–	10	.444	25	–	29	.463
UT Arlington ‍‍‍	8	–	10	.444	19	–	30	.388
Utah Valley ‍‍‍	4	–	14	.222	15	–	35	.300
† – Conference champion ‡ – Tournament champion y – Invited to the NCAA Tournament; As of May 17, 2026; Rankings from D1Baseball

=== Conference winners and tournaments ===
Twenty–nine athletic conferences each end their regular seasons with a single-elimination tournament or a double-elimination tournament. The teams in each conference that win their regular season title are given the number one seed in each tournament. The winners of these tournaments receive automatic invitations to the 2026 NCAA Division I baseball tournament.

Conference	Regular Season Winner	Conference Player of the Year	Conference Pitcher of the Year	Conference Coach of the Year	Conference Tournament	Tournament Venue (City)	Tournament Winner
America East Conference	Binghamton	Ehi Okokie, UMBC	Dylan Banner, Albany	Tim Sinicki, Binghamton & Liam Bowen, UMBC	2026 America East Conference baseball tournament	Baseball Complex • Vestal, NY	Binghamton
American Conference	East Carolina & UTSA (Note: Top seed in conference tournament.)	Drew Detlefsen, UTSA	Conor Myles, UTSA	Casey Dunn, UAB	2026 American Conference baseball tournament	BayCare Ballpark • Clearwater, FL	East Carolina
Atlantic 10 Conference	Saint Joseph's	Blake Primrose, Saint Joseph's	Joey Giordano, Richmond	Fritz Hamburg, Saint Joseph's	2026 Atlantic 10 Conference baseball tournament	Capital One Park • Tysons, VA	VCU
Atlantic Coast Conference	Georgia Tech	Tague Davis, Louisville	Wes Mendes, Florida State	James Ramsey, Georgia Tech	2026 Atlantic Coast Conference baseball tournament	Truist Field • Charlotte, NC	Georgia Tech
Atlantic Sun Conference	Gold - Lipscomb & North Alabama; Graphite - North Florida	Jon Embury, Florida Gulf Coast	Evan Dempsey, Florida Gulf Coast	Joe Mercadante, North Florida	2026 ASUN Conference baseball tournament	Melching Field at Conrad Park • DeLand, FL	Lipscomb
Big 12 Conference	Kansas	Landon Hairston, Arizona State	Maxx Yehl, West Virginia	Dan Fitzgerald, Kansas	2026 Big 12 Conference baseball tournament	Surprise Stadium • Surprise, AZ	Kansas
Big East Conference	St. John's, UConn, & Xavier	Jackson Marshall, UConn	Cayden Suchy, UConn	St. John's (Note: The Big East's end-of-season coaching award is officially styled as the "Coaching Staff of the Year" award and is presented to the entire honored staff. The head coach is specifically named in the award announcement.)	2026 Big East Conference baseball tournament	Prasco Park • Mason, OH	St. John's
Big South Conference	High Point	Seojun Oh, High Point	Ty Brachbill, High Point	Joey Hammond, High Point	2026 Big South Conference baseball tournament	HomeTrust Park • Asheville, NC	USC Upstate
Big Ten Conference	UCLA	Roch Cholowsky, UCLA	Mason Edwards, USC	John Savage, UCLA	2026 Big Ten baseball tournament	Charles Schwab Field Omaha • Omaha, NE	UCLA
Big West Conference	Cal Poly & UC Santa Barbara	Paul Contreras, Cal State Fullerton & Ryan Tayman, Cal Poly	Jackson Flora, UC Santa Barbara	Andrew Checketts, UC Santa Barbara & Larry Lee, Cal Poly	2026 Big West Conference baseball tournament	Cicerone Field at Anteater Ballpark • Irvine, CA	Cal Poly
Coastal Athletic Association	Campbell	Jamie Laskofski, William & Mary	David Rossow, Campbell	Chris Marx, Campbell	2026 Coastal Athletic Association baseball tournament	Brooks Field • Wilmington, NC	Northeastern
Conference USA	Jacksonville State	Tanner Marsh, Liberty	Ben Blair, Liberty	Steve Bieser, Jacksonville State	2026 Conference USA baseball tournament	Mickey Dunn Stadium • Kennesaw, GA	Jacksonville State
Horizon League	Wright State	Jake Paulick, Northern Kentucky	Braden Gebhardt, Youngstown State	Alex Sogard, Wright State	2026 Horizon League baseball tournament	Regular season champion home stadium	Milwaukee
Ivy League	Yale	Mika Petersen, Brown	Tate Evans, Yale	Brown (Note: The Ivy League's end-of-season coaching award is officially styled as the "Coaching Staff of the Year" award and is presented to the entire honored staff.)	2026 Ivy League baseball tournament	Campus Sites	Yale
Metro Atlantic Athletic Conference	Rider	Matt Bucciero, Fairfield	Ben Alekson, Fairfield	Brian Murphy, Merrimack	2026 Metro Atlantic Athletic Conference baseball tournament	Heritage Financial Park • Wappingers Falls, NY	Rider
Mid-American Conference	Miami (OH)	Tommy Harrison, Miami (OH)	Nathan Leininger, Toledo	Brian Smiley, Miami (OH)	2026 Mid-American Conference baseball tournament	ForeFront Field • Avon, OH	Northern Illinois
Missouri Valley Conference	UIC	Carter Beck, Indiana State	Andrew Evans, Southern Illinois	Sean McDermott, UIC	2026 Missouri Valley Conference baseball tournament	Johnny Reagan Field • Murray, KY	UIC
Mountain West Conference	San Diego State	Jake Jackson, San Diego State	Nick Lewis, Washington State	Kevin Vance, San Diego State	2026 Mountain West Conference baseball tournament	Sloan Park • Mesa, AZ	Washington State
Northeast Conference	LIU	Hunter Ray, Fairleigh Dickinson	Nicholas Finarelli, LIU	Manny Roman, Fairleigh Dickinson	2026 Northeast Conference baseball tournament	Skylands Stadium • Augusta, NJ	LIU
Ohio Valley Conference	SIU Edwardsville	Ryan Niedzwiedz, SIU Edwardsville & TJ Grines, UT Martin	Bryce Riggs, Eastern Illinois	Sean Lyons, SIU Edwardsville	2026 Ohio Valley Conference baseball tournament	Marion Stadium • Marion, IL	Little Rock
Patriot League	Army & Bucknell	CJ Egrie, Holy Cross	Brady Bendik, Navy	Bucknell (Note: The Patriot League's end-of-season coaching award is officially styled as the "Coaching Staff of the Year" award and is presented to the entire honored staff. The head coach is specifically named in the award announcement.)	2026 Patriot League baseball tournament	Campus Sites	Holy Cross
Southeastern Conference	Georgia	Daniel Jackson, Georgia	Aidan King, Florida	Wes Johnson, Georgia	2026 Southeastern Conference baseball tournament	Hoover Metropolitan Stadium • Hoover, AL	Georgia
Southern Conference	Mercer	Chris Katz, Mercer	Alec Bouchard, Wofford	Craig Gibson, Mercer	2026 Southern Conference baseball tournament	Fluor Field at the West End • Greenville, SC	The Citadel
Southland Conference	Southeastern Louisiana	Armani Raygoza, UT Rio Grande Valley	Chris Olivier, Lamar	Bobby Barbier, Southeastern Louisiana	2026 Southland Conference baseball tournament	Campus Sites	Lamar
Southwestern Athletic Conference	Bethune-Cookman	Jose Fernandez, Bethune-Cookman	Edwin Sanchez, Bethune-Cookman	Jonathan Hernandez, Bethune-Cookman	2026 Southwestern Athletic Conference baseball tournament	Rickwood Field • Birmingham, AL	Alabama State
Summit League	Oral Roberts	Makani Tanaka, Oral Roberts	Jack Hill, Oral Roberts	Ryan Folmar, Oral Roberts	2026 Summit League baseball tournament	Siebert Field • Minneapolis, MN	South Dakota State
Sun Belt Conference	Southern Miss	Jimmy Janicki, Troy	Grayden Harris, Southern Miss	Christian Ostrander, Southern Miss	2026 Sun Belt Conference baseball tournament	Dabos Park • Montgomery, AL	Southern Miss
West Coast Conference	Gonzaga	Mikey Bell, Gonzaga	Karsten Sweum, Gonzaga	Mark Machtolf, Gonzaga	2026 West Coast Conference baseball tournament	Scottsdale Stadium • Scottsdale, AZ	Saint Mary's
Western Athletic Conference	Tarleton	Chris Ramirez, California Baptist	Michael Malki, California Baptist	Fuller Smith, Tarleton State	2026 Western Athletic Conference baseball tournament	Hohokam Stadium • Mesa, AZ	Tarleton

== Award winners ==
Award	Player	Position	School
Golden Spikes Award	TBD		
Dick Howser Trophy	Daniel Jackson	C	Georgia
Bobby Bragan Collegiate Slugger Award	Daniel Jackson	C	Georgia
Baseball America College Player of the Year Award	Landon Hairston	OF	Arizona State
National Pitcher of the Year Award	Jackson Flora	P	UC Santa Barbara
Buster Posey Award	Daniel Jackson	C	Georgia
Brooks Wallace Award	Dylan Carey	SS	Nebraska
John Olerud Award	Evan Dempsey	P/OF	Florida Gulf Coast
Stopper of the Year Award	Sam Cozart	RP	Texas
Tony Gwynn Community Service Award	Lee Amedee	3B	Louisiana
College World Series Most Outstanding Player	Jaxon Willits	SS	Oklahoma

== Coaching changes ==
This Table lists programs that changed coaches at any point from the first day of the 2026 season until the day before the first day of the 2027 season.

Team	Former coach	Interim coach	New coach	Reason
Air Force	Mike Kazlausky	—N/a	Drew LaComb	Promoted to USAFA Director of Leadership and Institutional Strategy
Akron	Bryan Faulds	Brian Valentine		Hired as recruiting coordinator by Washington
Cal State Fullerton	Jason Dietrich	Cory Vanderhook		Resigned
Central Connecticut	Charlie Hickey	—N/a	Pat Hall	Retired
Coastal Carolina	Kevin Schnall	—N/a	Chris Lemonis	Hired as head coach by South Carolina
FIU	Rich Witten	—N/a	Pedro Grifol	Fired
Grand Canyon	Gregg Wallis	Nathan Bannister	Steve Bieser	Fired
Houston	Todd Whitting	—N/a	Will Davis	Fired
Jacksonville State	Steve Bieser	—N/a	Travis Creel	Hired as head coach by Grand Canyon
Lamar	Will Davis	—N/a	Sean Allen	Hired as head coach by Houston
Maryland Eastern Shore	Danny Acosta	—N/a	Justin Thomas	Fired
Merrimack	Brian Murphy	—N/a	Jeff Mejia	Resigned
NC State	Elliott Avent	—N/a	Chris Hart	Retired
Omaha	Evan Porter	—N/a	Rob Fournier	Resigning at end of season
Pacific	Reed Peters	—N/a	Toby DeMello	Died
Princeton	Scott Bradley	—N/a	Ryan Forrest	Fired
Queens	Jake Hendrick	—N/a	James Cullinane	Resigned
Saint Peter's	TJ Ward	—N/a	Joe Haumacher	Hired as assistant coach at Army
South Carolina	Paul Mainieri	Monte Lee	Kevin Schnall	Fired
Stetson	Steve Trimper	—N/a	Shane Gierke	Resigned
Towson	Matt Tyner	—N/a	Liam Bowen	Retired (effective July 1)
UC Riverside	Justin Johnson	—N/a	Gregg Wallis	Contract not renewed
UMBC	Liam Bowen	—N/a	Dave Gage	Hired as head coach by Towson
UNLV	Stan Stolte	—N/a	Nick Garritano	Retired

== See also ==
- 2026 NCAA Division I softball season
