= Brian Smiley =

American college baseball coach (born 1966)

Current position
- Title: Head Coach
- Team: Miami University
- Conference: MAC
- Record: 100–67

Biographical details
- Born: October 30, 1984 (age 41); Evansville, Indiana, U.S.
- Education: Arkansas-Little Rock

Coaching career (HC unless noted)
- 2008–2011: Indiana State (asst.)
- 2012: Iowa (asst.)
- 2013–2023: Indiana State (asst.)
- 2024–present: Miami (OH)

Head coaching record
- Overall: 100–67

Accomplishments and honors

Championships
- MAC tournament (2025); MAC regular season (2026)

Awards
- MAC Baseball Coach of the Year (2025, 2026)

Brian Smiley (born October 30, 1984) is an American baseball coach and former player, who is the current head coach of the Miami Redhawks. He played college baseball at Arkansas-Little Rock from 2006 to 2007, before entering the collegiate coaching profession at Indiana State. Smiley was then named the head coach at Miami University in 2023.

== Playing career ==
Over his four years as a student-athlete in collegiate baseball, Smiley played one season each at Triton College and Lincoln Trail College College before transferring to play two seasons (2006–2007) at Arkansas-Little Rock, batting .284 for his career as a utily player.

== Indiana State ==
Joining the Sycamores after finishing his playing career, Smiley helped guide the Sycamores to five NCAA postseason berths during his time in Terre Haute, including a trip to the Super Regionals in 2023, the first in program history. Indiana State was 442-292 during Smiley's time, never recording a losing season and posting nearly 50 victories over Power-5 programs.

When Indiana State head coach Rick Heller took the Iowa job in 2013, Smiley followed to Iowa City, but returned to Indiana State the following year as the top assistant to new head coach Mitch Hannahs.

== Miami University ==
Named as Head Coach in June 2023, Smiley led the Redhawks to a 27-27 (.500) record in his first season (2024), but would take Miami to the NCAA regionals in the 2025 season, finishing the season with a 35-23 (.603) overall record, winning the MAC regular season and tournament championship, with a 23-7 (.767) conference record.

== Head coaching record ==
Record table
Season	Team	Overall	Conference	Standing	Postseason
Miami RedHawks (Mid-American Conference) (2024–present)
2024	Miami (OH)	27–27	17–13	T–4th	MAC tournament
2025	Miami (OH)	35–23	23–7	T–1st	NCAA Regional
2026	Miami (OH)	38–17	25–8	1st	MAC tournament
Wright State:		100–67 (.599)	65–28 (.699)		
Total:		100–67 (.599)			
National champion Postseason invitational champion Conference regular season champion Conference regular season and conference tournament champion Division regular season champion Division regular season and conference tournament champion Conference tournament champion

== Personal life ==
Smiley graduated with a bachelor's degree in exercise science from Arkansas-Little Rock.

== See also ==
- List of current NCAA Division I baseball coaches
