= Alex Sogard =

American baseball player (born 1987)

Current position
- Title: Head coach
- Team: Wright State
- Conference: Horizon League
- Record: 250–172 (.592)

Biographical details
- Born: July 25, 1987 (age 39); Phoenix, Arizona, U.S.

Playing career
- 2007: Oregon State
- 2008–2010: NC State
- 2010: Tri-City ValleyCats
- 2011: Lexington Legends
- 2012: Lancaster JetHawks
- 2012–2014: Corpus Christi Hooks
- 2012: Mesa Solar Sox
- 2013: Oklahoma City RedHawks
- 2013: Peoria Javelinas
- 2014: Mobile BayBears
- 2015: St. Paul Saints
- 2015: Wichita Wingnuts
- Position: Pitcher

Coaching career (HC unless noted)
- 2017–2018: Wright State (asst.)
- 2019–present: Wright State

Head coaching record
- Overall: 250–172 (.592)
- Tournaments: Horizon: 15–6; NCAA: 2–8

Accomplishments and honors

Championships
- 7× Horizon League regular season (2019, 2021–2026); 4× Horizon League Tournament (2021–2023, 2025)

Awards
- 6× Horizon League Coach of the Year (2019, 2021, 2023–2026)

Alexander Kyle Sogard (born July 25, 1987) is an American baseball coach and former pitcher who is the current head baseball coach of the Wright State Raiders. He played college baseball at Oregon State from 2006 to 2007 before transferring to NC State where he played for coach Elliott Avent from 2008 to 2010 before playing professionally for 6 seasons from 2010 to 2015.

== Playing career ==
=== Amateur ===
Sogard attended Thunderbird High School in Phoenix, Arizona. Sogard played for the school's varsity baseball team all four years. As a senior, Sogard was a 2nd Team All-State pitcher and first baseman, behind Ike Davis. Sogard then enrolled at the Oregon State University, to play college baseball for the Oregon State Beavers baseball team.

At Oregon State, Sogard was a redshirt freshman when the Beavers won the 2006 College World Series. He pitched for Oregon State in 2007, as the Beavers won their second College World Series in as many years. Sogard then transferred to North Carolina State University, where he continued his college baseball career with the NC State Wolfpack. He was a starter and reliever during his 3 years at N.C. State. Sogard was instrumental in the Wolfpack reaching the postseason in two of his three years there, including N.C. State's third Super Regional appearance in 2008. After the 2008 season, he played collegiate summer baseball with the Cotuit Kettleers of the Cape Cod Baseball League.

=== Professional ===
The Houston Astros selected Sogard in the 26th round of the 2010 MLB draft. Alex was also drafted by the Diamondbacks in 2008 but did not sign. Sogard continued winning in pro ball as his Short Season Valley Cats won the N.Y. Penn League in 2010. Alex continued his ascent through the Astros minor league system playing for a strong Lexington Legends team in 2011, AA Corpus Christi in 2012, and AAA Oklahoma City in 2013. After the 2013 season, they assigned him to the Arizona Fall League.

Sogard was traded to the Arizona Diamondbacks for Cesar Carrasco on July 7, 2014.

Sogard would play the 2015 season for the St. Paul Saints and the Wichita Wingnuts of the American Association of Independent Professional Baseball.

== Coaching career ==
On August 9, 2016, Sogard began his coaching career as an assistant at Wright State University.

On July 6, 2018, Sogard was promoted to head coach of the Wright State Raiders.

In 2020, Sogard was named Horizon League Coach of the Year for the first time. On May 25, 2021, Sogard was named Horizon League Coach of the Year for a second consecutive year, after leading Wright State to the Horizon League title.

On May 23, 2023, Sogard was named Horizon League Coach of the Year for the third time, after Wright State's 22–8 season and top seed in the 2023 Horizon League baseball tournament.

== Head coaching record ==
Record table
| Season | Team | Overall | Conference | Standing | Postseason |
|---|---|---|---|---|---|
Wright State Raiders (Horizon League) (2019–present)
| 2019 | Wright State | 42–17 | 22–8 | 1st | Horizon tournament |
| 2020 | Wright State | 6–9 | 0–0 | | Season canceled due to COVID-19 |
| 2021 | Wright State | 35–13 | 28–4 | 1st | NCAA Regional |
| 2022 | Wright State | 30–27 | 20–9 | 1st | NCAA Regional |
| 2023 | Wright State | 39–23 | 22–8 | 1st | NCAA Regional |
| 2024 | Wright State | 32–24 | 20–10 | 1st | Horizon tournament |
| 2025 | Wright State | 40–21 | 25–5 | 1st | NCAA Regional |
| 2026 | Wright State | 27–28 | 17–7 | 1st | Horizon tournament |
| Wright State: | | 250–172 (.592) | 154–51 (.751) | | |
| Total: | | 250–172 (.592) | | | |
National champion Postseason invitational champion Conference regular season champion Conference regular season and conference tournament champion Division regular season champion Division regular season and conference tournament champion Conference tournament champion

== Personal life ==
Sogard is the son of Anna Vodicka Sogard & Bruce Sogard and the younger brother of former MLB player Eric Sogard. He is also the cousin of MLB player Nick Sogard.

== See also ==
- List of current NCAA Division I baseball coaches
