= Jim Chester =

American college baseball coach and former player

Current position
- Title: Head coach
- Team: Gardner–Webb
- Conference: Big South
- Record: 156–189

Playing career
- 2000–2003: Thiel College

Coaching career (HC unless noted)
- 2004–2005: Seton Hill (asst.)
- 2006–2007: Mercyhurst North East
- 2008–2014: Penn State Greater Allegheny
- 2015–2017: Lock Haven
- 2018–2019: Barton College
- 2020–present: Gardner–Webb

Head coaching record
- Overall: 265–315–1 (NCAA) 25-22 (NJCAA) 207-107-1 (USCAA)
- Tournaments: Big South: 3–6; NCAA: 0–0

Accomplishments and honors

Championships
- 4× PSUAC Champion (2010–11, 2013–14); 3× PSUAC Tournament (2011, 2013–14)

Awards
- Big South Coach of the Year (2021)

Jim Chester is an American college baseball coach and former player. He is the head baseball coach for Gardner–Webb University. Chester played college baseball at Thiel College for coach Joe Schaly from 2000 to 2003.

== Playing career ==
Chester played college baseball at Thiel College.

== Coaching career ==
On August 4, 2014, Chester was named the head baseball coach for Lock Haven University. On November 8, 2017, Chester was named the head baseball coach for Barton College.

On June 14, 2019, Chester was named the head coach at Gardner–Webb University.

== Head coaching record ==
Record table
Season	Team	Overall	Conference	Standing	Postseason
Mercyhurst North East Saints (Western New York Athletic Conference) (2007)
2007	Mercyhurst North East	25–22			
Mercyhurst Northeast:		25–22 NJCAA			
Penn State Greater Allegheny Lions (Penn State University Athletic Conference) (2008–2014)
2008	Penn State Greater Allegheny	23–23	11–9		
2009	Penn State Greater Allegheny	35–15	19–7		
2010	Penn State Greater Allegheny	24–12	17–2	1st	
2011	Penn State Greater Allegheny	30–13–1	18–1	1st	
2012	Penn State Greater Allegheny	28–15	15–6	2nd	
2013	Penn State Greater Allegheny	35–17	19–3	1st	
2014	Penn State Greater Allegheny	32–12	20–0	1st	
Penn State Greater Allegheny:		207–107–1 USCAA	119–28		
Lock Haven Bald Eagles (Pennsylvania State Athletic Conference) (2015–2017)
2015	Lock Haven	13–24	11–17	T-5th (East)	
2016	Lock Haven	21–28–1	9–18–1	6th (East)	
2017	Lock Haven	32–18	16–12	3rd (East)	
Lock Haven:		66–70–1	36–47–1		
Barton Bulldogs (Conference Carolinas) (2018–2019)
2018	Barton	12–36	4–19	8th	
2019	Barton	31–20	17–9	2nd	
Barton:		43–56	21–28		
Gardner–Webb Runnin' Bulldogs (Big South Conference) (2020–present)
2020	Gardner–Webb	8–8	0–0		Season canceled due to COVID-19
2021	Gardner–Webb	29–23	27–13	3rd	Big South Tournament
2022	Gardner–Webb	24–36	11–13	T-6th	Big South Tournament
2023	Gardner–Webb	31–25	15–12	T-3rd	Big South Tournament
2024	Gardner–Webb	22–31	9–15	7th	
2025	Gardner–Webb	17–36	6–18	9th	
2026	Gardner–Webb	25–30	10–14	7th	
Gardner–Webb:		156–189	78–85		
Total:		265–315–1 NCAA			
National champion Postseason invitational champion Conference regular season champion Conference regular season and conference tournament champion Division regular season champion Division regular season and conference tournament champion Conference tournament champion

== See also ==
- List of current NCAA Division I baseball coaches
