= Dan Pepicelli =

American baseball coach and former outfielder

Current position
- Title: Head coach
- Team: Cornell
- Conference: Ivy League
- Record: 124–215–1 (.366)

Biographical details
- Born: May 18, 1967 (age 59); Schenectady, New York, U.S.

Playing career
- 1986–1987: Mohawk Valley C. C.
- 1989: Cortland
- 1990: Oneonta
- Position: Outfielder

Coaching career (HC unless noted)
- 1988: Mohawk Valley C. C. (asst.)
- 1996–1998: Hartwick (asst.)
- 1999–2000: Hartwick
- 2001–2009: St. John Fisher
- 2010–2015: Clemson (asst.)
- 2016–present: Cornell

Head coaching record
- Overall: 324–352–2 (.479)
- Tournaments: NCAA: 0–0

Daniel James Pepicelli (born May 18, 1967) is an American baseball coach and former outfielder, who is the current head baseball coach of the Cornell Big Red. He played college baseball at Mohawk Valley Community College, Cortland and Oneonta from 1986 to 1990. He served as the head coach of the Hartwick Hawks (1999–2000) and St. John Fisher Cardinals (2001–2009).

== Coaching career ==
Pepicelli lead St. John Fisher College for 9 years, compiling a 200–136–1 record.

On October 5, 2009, Pepicelli left St. John Fisher so join the coaching staff of the Clemson Tigers baseball team.

On August 6, 2015, Pepicelli was named the head coach of the Cornell Big Red baseball program.

== Head coaching record ==
Record table
Season	Team	Overall	Conference	Standing	Postseason
Hartwick Hawks (Empire 8) (1999–2000)
1999	Hartwick				
2000	Hartwick				
Hartwick:		0–0			
St. John Fisher Cardinals (Empire 8) (2001–2009)
2001	St. John Fisher	19–14			
2002	St. John Fisher	15–19			
2003	St. John Fisher	16–16	4–4	T-2nd	
2004	St. John Fisher	27–14	4–4	3rd	
2005	St. John Fisher	22–15	5–3	T-2nd	
2006	St. John Fisher	26–15	9–7	3rd	
2007	St. John Fisher	28–13	7–5	T-2nd	
2008	St. John Fisher	25–14–1	9–7	3rd	
2009	St. John Fisher	22–17	8–8	3rd	
St. John Fisher:		200–137–1 (.593)	46–38 (.548)		
Cornell Big Red (Ivy League) (2016–present)
2016	Cornell	14–24	7–13	4th (Lou Gehrig)	
2017	Cornell	21–17	9–11	3rd (Lou Gehrig)	
2018	Cornell	14–22–1	9–12	6th	
2019	Cornell	14–24	8–13	T-7th	
2020	Cornell	1–8	0–0		Season canceled due to COVID-19
2021	Cornell	0–0	0–0		Ivy League opted-out of the season
2022	Cornell	11–25	5–16	7th	
2023	Cornell	9–26	8–13	7th	
2024	Cornell	17–21	13–10	3rd	Ivy League Tournament
2025	Cornell	12–22	7–14	T-7th	
2026	Cornell	11–26	8–13	T-6th	
Cornell:		124–215–1 (.366)	74–115 (.392)		
Total:		324–352–2 (.479)			
National champion Postseason invitational champion Conference regular season champion Conference regular season and conference tournament champion Division regular season champion Division regular season and conference tournament champion Conference tournament champion

== See also ==
- List of current NCAA Division I baseball coaches
