= Rob DiToma =

American baseball player and coach (born 1983)

Current position
- Title: Head coach
- Team: San Francisco
- Conference: West Coast
- Record: 65–93

Biographical details
- Born: September 25, 1983 (age 42)

Playing career
- 2002–2005: Mercy College (NY)
- Position: Second baseman

Coaching career (HC unless noted)
- 2006–2007: Manhattanville College (asst)
- 2008: Temple (asst)
- 2009: Siena (asst)
- 2010–2013: Iona (asst)
- 2014–2019: Fordham (asst)
- 2020–2022: Fairleigh Dickinson
- 2023–present: San Francisco

Head coaching record
- Overall: 102–160
- Tournaments: NCAA: 0–0

Robert DiToma (born September 25, 1983) is an American baseball coach and former second baseman, who is the current head baseball coach of the San Francisco Dons. DiToma played college baseball at Mercy College in New York from 2002 to 2005 for coach Bill Sullivan. He served as the head coach of the Fairleigh Dickinson Knights (2020–2022).

== Playing career ==
As a freshman at Mercy College in 2002, DiToma had a 12 doubles and 30 walks, both which ranked in the top 10 for Mercy records.

In the 2004 season as a junior, DiToma had 58 hits, while hitting 12 doubles. He was named a 2nd team All-New York Collegiate Athletic Conference performer in 2004.

== Coaching career ==
DiToma began his coaching career as an assistant at Manhattanville College. DiToma later coached for Temple University. After a single season at Temple, DiToma was named the hitting coach for the Siena College. Following the 2009 season, DiToma joined the staff of the Iona Gaels baseball program. On July 23, 2013, DiToma was named an assistant at Fordham University.

On June 20, 2019, DiToma was named the head coach of the Fairleigh Dickinson Knights baseball program.

On June 15, 2022, DiToma left the Knights to become the head baseball coach of the San Francisco Dons.

Statistics overview
Season	Team	Overall	Conference	Standing	Postseason
Fairleigh Dickinson Knights (Northeast Conference) (2020–2022)
2020	Fairleigh Dickinson	4–9	0–0		Season canceled due to COVID-19
2021	Fairleigh Dickinson	9–28	8–22	T-6th	
2022	Fairleigh Dickinson	24–30	16–11	4th	
Fairleigh Dickinson:		37–67	24–33		
San Francisco Dons (West Coast Conference) (2023–present)
2023	San Francisco	18–29	8–19	T–8th	
2025	San Francisco	26–30	9–15	6th	WCC tournament
San Francisco:		65–93	21–54		
Total:		102–160			
National champion Postseason invitational champion Conference regular season champion Conference regular season and conference tournament champion Division regular season champion Division regular season and conference tournament champion Conference tournament champion

== See also ==
- List of current NCAA Division I baseball coaches
