= Brock Ungricht =

American college baseball coach

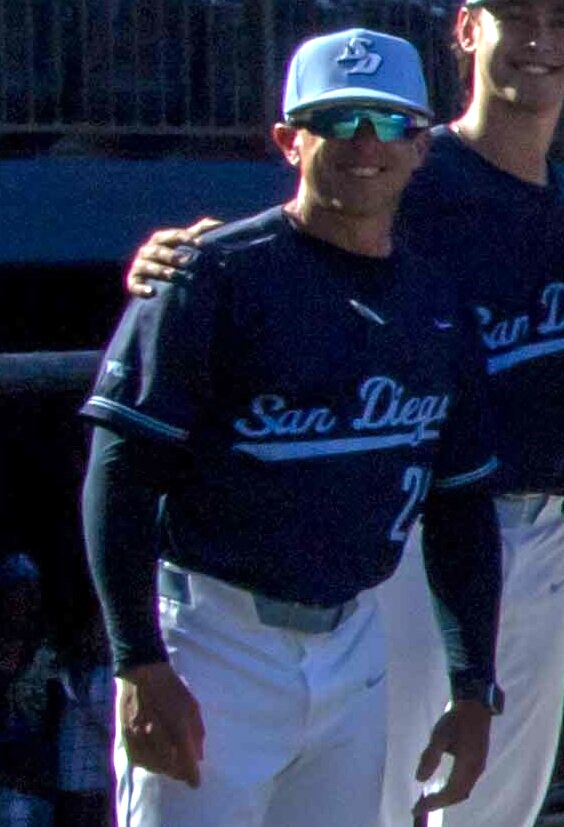
- Ungricht with San Diego in 2024

Current position
- Title: Head coach
- Team: San Diego
- Conference: WCC
- Record: 150–119–2 (.557)

Biographical details
- Born: December 31, 1984 (age 41)
- Education: San Diego State University

Playing career
- 2004–2006: San Diego State
- 2006: GCL Yankees
- 2007: Chico Outlaws
- Position: First baseman

Coaching career (HC unless noted)
- 2011–2016: Stanford (Assistant)
- 2017–2018: St. Louis Cardinals (Southern California Area Scout)
- 2019–2021: San Diego (Hitting Coach/Recruiting Coord.)
- 2022–present: San Diego

Head coaching record
- Overall: 150–119–2 (.557)
- Tournaments: West Coast Conference Tournament: 10–3; NCAA Division 1 Tournament: 2–4

Accomplishments and honors

Championships
- 2 West Coast Conference Championship - 2022, 2024; 2 West Coast Conference regular season- 2024, 2025

Awards
- 2× WCC Coach of the Year (2024, 2025)

Brock Ungricht (born December 31, 1984) is an American college baseball coach who is the head coach of the San Diego Toreros baseball team at the University of San Diego (USD). He was the hitting coach and recruiting coordinator at San Diego from 2019 to 2021. Prior to San Diego, Ungricht was a scout for the St. Louis Cardinals from 2017–2018 and an assistant coach at Stanford from 2011-2016.

== Playing career ==
Brock Ungricht played three years of college baseball at San Diego State from 2004 to 2006. In 2005, he played collegiate summer baseball with the Orleans Cardinals of the Cape Cod Baseball League. He was selected by the New York Yankees in the 30th round of the 2006 Major League Baseball draft. Ungricht played for the GCL Yankees in 2006 and the Chico Outlaws in 2007 before retiring from professional baseball.

== Head coaching record ==
Record table
Season	Team	Overall	Conference	Standing	Postseason
San Diego Toreros (West Coast Conference) (2022–present)
2022	San Diego	37–20	17–10	T–2nd	NCAA regional
2023	San Diego	24–24–1	17–10	T–2nd	WCC tournament
2024	San Diego	41–15	20–4	1st	NCAA regional
2025	San Diego	28–30	19–5	1st	WCC tournament
2026	San Diego	20–30–1	12–14–1	8th	
San Diego:		150–119–2 (.557)	85–43–1 (.663)		
Total:		150–119–2 (.557)			
National champion Postseason invitational champion Conference regular season champion Conference regular season and conference tournament champion Division regular season champion Division regular season and conference tournament champion Conference tournament champion
