= Matt Tyner =

American baseball coach

Biographical details
- Born: November 7, 1958 (age 67); Decatur, Illinois, U.S.

Playing career
- 1977–1980: Miami (FL)
- 1980: Miami Orioles
- 1981: Hagerstown Suns
- 1982–1983: Charlotte O's
- 1983: Hagerstown Suns
- Position: Third baseman / Outfielder

Coaching career (HC unless noted)
- 1993–1997, 2009–2011: Butler (asst.)
- 2012–2013: Bellarmine
- 2014–2017: Richmond (asst.)
- 2018–2026: Towson

Head coaching record
- Overall: 206–353
- Tournaments: NCAA DII: 4–2

Accomplishments and honors

Championships
- GLVC Championship (2013); GLVC Tournament (2013)

Matthew A. Tyner (born November 7, 1958) is an American baseball coach and former outfielder and third baseman, who is the former head baseball coach of the Towson Tigers. He played college baseball at the University of Miami for coach Ron Fraser from 1977 to 1980 and played in Minor League Baseball (MiLB) for 4 seasons from 1980 to 1983. He served as the head coach of the Bellarmine Knights (2012–2013).

== Playing career ==
Tyner attended the University of Miami, to play college baseball for the Miami Hurricanes baseball team. Tyner helped the Hurricanes to 3 consecutive berths in the College World Series from 1978 to 1980. He was drafted in the 9th round of the 1980 Major League Baseball draft by the Baltimore Orioles. Tyner played three seasons in the Orioles system before a series of elbow injuries forced him to retire.

== Coaching career ==
Tyner became a coach with the Butler Bulldogs baseball program in 1993. Tyner left the program in 1997. After spending a decade with the Indiana Bulls, Tyner returned to Butler as an assistant in 2009.

On June 14, 2011, Tyner was named the head coach of the Bellarmine Knights baseball program. Tyner went 60–46 in two seasons with the Knights. He led the team to a 2013 Great Lakes Valley Conference (GLVC) regular season and tournament championship. The Knights went 4–2 in the Midwest Regional.

In 2014, Tyner was hired as an assistant for the Richmond Spiders baseball program.

On June 22, 2017, Tyner left Richmond to accept the head coaching position of the Towson Tigers baseball program.

== Head coaching record ==
Record table
Season	Team	Overall	Conference	Standing	Postseason
Bellarmine Knights (Great Lakes Valley Conference) (2012–2013)
2012	Bellarmine	27–23	19–15	4th (East)	Great West Tournament
2013	Bellarmine	33–23	20–13	3rd (East)	NCAA Regional
Bellarmine:		60–46	39–28		
Towson Tigers (Colonial Athletic Association) (2018–2026)
2018	Towson	13–42	6–18	8th	
2019	Towson	14–39	7–17	9th	
2020	Towson	7–8	0–0		Season canceled due to COVID-19
2021	Towson	21–36	11–12	2nd (North)	CAA Tournament
2022	Towson	14–39	4–19	9th	
2023	Towson	19–37	7–23	10th	
2024	Towson	15–39	5–20	12th	
2025	Towson	21–35	11–16	T–8th	
2026	Towson	22–32	9–21	10th	
Towson:		146–307	60–146		
Total:		206–353			
National champion Postseason invitational champion Conference regular season champion Conference regular season and conference tournament champion Division regular season champion Division regular season and conference tournament champion Conference tournament champion

== See also ==
- List of current NCAA Division I baseball coaches
