= Liam Bowen =

American baseball player and coach

Current position
- Title: Head coach
- Team: Towson
- Conference: CAA
- Record: 0–0

Playing career
- 2003–2006: Macalester College
- Position: Pitcher

Coaching career (HC unless noted)
- 2007–2010: St. Mary's (MD) (asst)
- 2011: Lincoln Memorial (GA)
- 2012–2019: UMBC (asst.)
- 2019–2026: UMBC
- 2027–present: Towson

Head coaching record
- Overall: 149–181
- Tournaments: NCAA: 0–0

Accomplishments and honors

Awards
- America East Coach of the Year: 2026

Liam Bowen is an American college baseball coach and former player, who is the current head baseball coach of the Towson Tigers.

== Playing career ==
Bowen attended Montgomery Blair High School in Silver Spring, Maryland. Upon graduation, Bowen enrolled at Macalester College in St. Paul, Minnesota. Bowen pitched 4 seasons for the Scots.

As a freshman in 2003, Bowen made 4 relief appearances pitching 3.1 innings and striking out 2 batters.

In 2004 as a sophomore, Bowen took on the ace role of the team's pitching staff. He led the team with 3 wins with a team low 4.19 ERA. He also led the team with 49 strikeouts.

As a junior in 2005, Bowen pitched a team-high 59 innings, 11 starts, 4 complete games and 43 strikeouts.

In 2006, Bowen went 6–2 with a 5.18 ERA.

== Coaching career ==
Upon graduation, Bowen accepted a position at St. Mary's College of Maryland as a pitching coach. He was at St. Mary's for 4 years, dropping the team ERA by 3 runs during his tenure. In 2011, Bowen became a graduate assistant at Lincoln Memorial University.

On September 7, 2011, Bowen was named a volunteer assistant coach for the UMBC Retrievers baseball team. On May 1, 2019, Bowen was named the interim head coach for the Retrievers when Bob Mumma resigned.

On May 22, 2019, Bowen was promoted to head coach of the Retrievers.

On June 12, 2026, Bowen was hired by the Towson Tigers baseball team as their new head coach, replacing the retiring Matt Tyner.

== Head coaching record ==
Record table
Season	Team	Overall	Conference	Standing	Postseason
UMBC Retrievers (America East Conference) (2019–2026)
2019	UMBC	2–9	0–5	7th	
2020	UMBC	3–10	0–0		Season canceled due to COVID-19
2021	UMBC	17–26	12–26	4th (Division B)	
2022	UMBC	23–32	11–19	4th (Division B)	America East Tournament
2023	UMBC	30–27	16–8	2nd	America East Tournament
2024	UMBC	27–25	14–10	2nd	America East Tournament
2025	UMBC	18–28	8–16	6th	America East Tournament
2026	UMBC	29–24	15–9	2nd	America East Tournament
UMBC:		149–181	76–88		
Total:		149–181			
National champion Postseason invitational champion Conference regular season champion Conference regular season and conference tournament champion Division regular season champion Division regular season and conference tournament champion Conference tournament champion
