= Greg Mamula =

American baseball coach

Current position
- Title: Head coach
- Team: Delaware
- Conference: Conference USA
- Record: 108–115

Biographical details
- Born: DuBois, Pennsylvania, U.S.

Playing career
- 1995–1998: St. Bonaventure
- Position: Infielder

Coaching career (HC unless noted)
- 1999–2001: Shippensburg (Asst)
- 2002–2006: Delaware (P/RC)
- 2007–2009: West Chester
- 2010–2015: Cincinnati (H/IF)
- 2016–2022: Florida Atlantic (H/IF/RC)
- 2023–present: Delaware

Head coaching record
- Overall: 232–160
- Tournaments: NCAA D2 11–6 NCAA: 0–0 CAA:2–4 PSAC: 6–4

Accomplishments and honors

Championships
- PSAC Regular Season (2009); PSAC Conference Tournament (2009)

Awards
- DII World Series (2009) PSAC COY (2009) Atlantic Region COY (2009)

Greg Mamula is a baseball coach and former infielder, who is the current head baseball coach of the Delaware Fightin' Blue Hens. He played college baseball at St. Bonaventure from 1995 to 1998.

== Playing career ==
Mamula grew up in DuBois, Pennsylvania, where he attended DuBois Area Senior High School. Mamula would go on to play college baseball for the St. Bonaventure Bonnies.

== Coaching career ==
In June 2022, Mamula was named the head coach of the Delaware Fightin' Blue Hens.

== Head coaching record ==
Record table
Season	Team	Overall	Conference	Standing	Postseason
West Chester Golden Rams (PSAC) (2007–2009)
2007	West Chester	33–17	13–7		NCAA Regionals
2008	West Chester	45–16	11–9		NCAA Regionals
2009	West Chester	46–12	21–3		NCAA Division 2 World Series
West Chester:		124–45	45–19		
Delaware Fightin' Blue Hens (Colonial Athletic Association) (2023–2025)
2023	Delaware	30–29	17–13	5th	CAA Tournament
2024	Delaware	31–26	16–11	4th	CAA Tournament
2025	Delaware	28–25	12–15	7th	
Delaware Fightin' Blue Hens (Conference USA) (2026–present)
2026	Delaware	19–35	7–23	12th	
Delaware:		108–115	52–62		
Total:		232–160			
National champion Postseason invitational champion Conference regular season champion Conference regular season and conference tournament champion Division regular season champion Division regular season and conference tournament champion Conference tournament champion
