= 2026 UConn Huskies baseball team =

American college baseball season

2026 UConn Huskies baseball

Big East regular season co-champions
- Conference: Big East Conference
- Record: 32–26 (15–6 Big East)
- Head coach: Jim Penders (23rd season)
- Assistant coaches: Jeff Hourigan (15th season); Joshua McDonald (15th season); Chris Podeszwa (23rd season)
- Home stadium: Elliot Ballpark

2026 Big East Conference baseball standings
	Conf.				Overall
Team	W		L	PCT	W		L	PCT
UConn ‍†‍‍	15	–	6	.714	32	–	24	.571
St. John's ‍†‍‡‍^{y}	15	–	6	.714	30	–	24	.556
Xavier ‍†‍‍	15	–	6	.714	27	–	28	.491
Creighton ‍‍‍	13	–	8	.619	29	–	24	.547
Georgetown ‍‍‍	9	–	12	.429	28	–	28	.500
Butler ‍‍‍	9	–	12	.429	20	–	34	.370
Villanova ‍‍‍	5	–	16	.238	19	–	30	.388
Seton Hall ‍‍‍	3	–	18	.143	16	–	30	.348
† – Conference champion ‡ – Tournament champion y – Invited to the NCAA tournament As of May 17, 2026; Rankings from D1Baseball

The 2026 UConn Huskies baseball team represents the University of Connecticut in the 2026 NCAA Division I baseball season. The Huskies play their home games at Elliot Ballpark on campus in Storrs, Connecticut. The team is coached by Jim Penders, in his 23rd season at UConn. They play as members of the Big East Conference.

The Huskies completed the regular season with a 32–24 record, including 15–6 in the Big East. They finished in a three-way tie for first place, their sixth straight year with at least a share of the Big East regular season title. Penders earned his 800th win on May 3, 2026 against East Tennessee State. UConn entered the 2026 Big East Conference baseball tournament as the second seed, having lost a series to top-seeded St. John's and won the series against third-seeded Xavier. In the Tournament, the Huskies were eliminated in two games.

== Previous Season ==
The Huskies finished the regular season with a 17–4 conference record, 38–21 overall, claiming a share of the Big East title. They entered the 2025 Big East Conference baseball tournament as the second seed, as Creighton claimed a tiebreaker from an early season series. UConn finished the tournament 2–2 and was not included in the NCAA Tournament field.

== Personnel ==
=== Roster ===
2026 Connecticut Huskies roster
Pitchers: 10 - Drew Smith - Sophomore; 12 - Sean Finn - Junior; 13 - Charlie West - Junior; 15 - Brady Ericson - Freshman; 18 - Charlie Hale - Junior; 20 - Evan Hamberger - Senior; 22 - Garret Garbinski - (redshirt) Junior; 24 - Matt McDowell - Freshman; 25 - Ryan Tatar - Freshman; 26 - Joe Pitts - (redshirt) Sophomore; 27 - Tristan Aasland - Junior; 30 - Frank Spirito IV - (redshirt) Sophomore; 32 - Austin Trumpour - Graduate; 36 - Paxton Meyers - Graduate; 37 - Sam Hutchinson - Junior; 38 - JT Caruso - Junior; 39 - Kyle Peters - (redshirt) Sophomore; 40 - Joe Talarico - Junior; 41 - Greg Shaw III - Senior; 45 - Cayden Suchy - Sophomore; 46 - Rob Gilchrist - (redshirt) Junior; 46 - Oliver Pudvar - (redshirt) Junior; 48 - Justin Lessing - Graduate	Catchers: 5 - Steve Thomas - Graduate; 6 - Cam Righi - Freshman; 11 - Connor Lane - Sophomore; 42 - Gabriel Tirado - Sophomore; 54 - Chris Cancel - Sophomore; Outfielders: 1 - Chris Polemeni - (redshirt) Junior; 9 - Chase Taylor - Junior; 49 - Nater Wachter - Junior	Infielders: 2 - Tyler Minick - Junior; 3 - Rob Rispoli - (redshirt) Sophomore; 4 - Evan Menzel - Sophomore; 19 - Peyton Jemison - (redshirt) Sophomore; 21 - Logan Charboneau - Freshman; 31 - Jackson Marshall - Sophomore; 34 - Bryce Detwiler - Freshman; 43 - Maddix Dalena - (redshirt) Junior; Utility: 7 - Anthony Belisario - Sophomore

=== Coaches ===
2026 Connecticut Huskies baseball coaching staff
- 16 – Jim Penders – Head coach – 23rd season
- 29 – Jeff Hourigan – Assistant coach/Recruiting coordinator – 15th season
- 33 – Joshua MacDonald – Assistant coach – 15th season
- 14 – Chris Podeszwa – Volunteer assistant coach – 23rd season

== Schedule ==
Legend
	UConn win
	UConn loss
	Cancellation
**Bold**	UConn team member
*	Non-Conference game

2026 Connecticut Huskies baseball game log (32–24)
Regular season (32–24)

February (4–6)
Date	Opponent	Rank	Site/Stadium	Score	Win	Loss	Save	Attendance	Overall Record	BE Record
Feb 13	vs Nebraska*		Salt River Fields at Talking Stick • Scottsdale, AZ (MLB Desert Invitational)	**L** 2–12 ^{(7)}	Clark (1–0)	**West (0–1)**	None		0–1	
Feb 14	vs Kansas State*		Scottsdale Stadium • Scottsdale, AZ (MLB Desert Invitational)	**L** 3–7	Feser (1–0)	**Meyers (0–1)**	None	368	0–2	
Feb 15	vs Air Force*		Salt River Fields at Talking Stick • Scottsdale, AZ (MLB Desert Invitational)	**L** 6–12	Downing (1–0)	**Pudivar (0–1)**	Rhyne (1)	275	0–3	
Feb 17	at Arizona State*		Phoenix Municipal Stadium • Phoenix, AZ	**L** 7–17	Klecker (0–1)	**Aasland (0–1)**	None	2,834	0–4	
Feb 19	at Arizona*		Hi Corbett Field • Tucson, AZ	**W** 6–4 ^{(12)}	**Shaw III (1–0)**	Kling (0–1)	None	1,887	1–4	
Feb 20	at Arizona*		Hi Corbett Field • Tucson, AZ	**W** 4–0	**West (1–0)**	Kramkowski (0–1)	None	2,274	2–4	
Feb 21	at Arizona*		Hi Corbett Field • Tucson, AZ	**L** 4–5	Hicks (1–0)	**Garbinski (0–1)**	Brandt (1)	2,913	2–5	
Feb 22	at Arizona*		Hi Corbett Field • Tucson, AZ	**W** 11–2	**Pudvar (1–1)**	McKinney (0–2)	**Finn (2)**	3,129	3–5	
Feb 27	at UNC Wilmington*		Brooks Field • Wilmington, NC	**W** 5–2	**Hale (1–0)**	Capocci (0–1)	None	1,002	4–5	
Feb 28	at UNC Wilmington*		Brooks Field • Wilmington, NC	**L** 1–2	Ruh (2–0)	**Meyers (0–2)**	None	1,327	4–6	

March (11–9)
Date	Opponent	Rank	Site/Stadium	Score	Win	Loss	Save	Attendance	Overall Record	BE Record
Mar 1	at UNC Wilmington*		Brooks Field • Wilmington, NC	**L** 2–7	Williford (1–0)	**Finn (0–1)**	None	1,459	4–7	
Mar 4	New Haven*		Elliot Ballpark • Storrs, CT	**W** 9–4	**Aasland (1–1)**	Glickman (0–3)	None	350	5–7	
Mar 6	at Old Dominion*		Bud Metheny Ballpark • Norfolk, VA	**W** 4–2	**West (2–1)**	Kuskie (2–2)	**Meyers (2)**	143	6–7	
Mar 7	at Old Dominion*		Bud Metheny Ballpark • Norfolk, VA	**W** 14–3	**Shaw III (2–0)**	Gatti (0–2)	None	304	7–7	
Mar 8	at Old Dominion*		Bud Metheny Ballpark • Norfolk, VA	**L** 5–6	Tanton (1–0)	**Pudvair (1–2)**	Davis (2)	116	7–8	
Mar 10	Boston College*		Elliot Ballpark • Storrs, CT	**L** 19–26	Hard (2–1)	**Aasland (1–2)**	None	558	7–9	
Mar 14	at Portland*		Joe Etzel Field • Portland, OR	**W** 8–5	**Hale (2–0)**	Segal (0–1)	**Meyers (3)**	242	8–9	
Mar 14	at Portland*		Joe Etzel Field • Portland, OR	**L** 6–8	Swygart (2–0)	**Suchy (0–1)**	Via (2)	242 (DH)	8–10	
Mar 15	at Portland*		Joe Etzel Field • Portland, OR	**L** 3–5	Louis (1–1)	**Meyers (0–3)**	None	231	8–11	
Mar 17	at California*		Evans Diamond • Berkeley, CA	**W** 9–3	**Hale (3–0)**	Roach (1–1)	**Trumpour (1)**	407	9–11	
Mar 18	at Santa Clara*		Stephen Schott Stadium • Santa Clara, CA	**W** 12–5	**Shaw III (–0)**	Lazark (1–1)	None	387	10–11	
Mar 20	at San Jose State*		Excite Ballpark • San Jose, CA	**L** 6–16 ^{(10)}	Thomas (2–2)	**West (2–2)**	None	386	10–12	
Mar 21	vs San Diego State*		Excite Ballpark • San Jose, CA	**L** 4–6	Russell (3–1)	**Trumpour (0–1)**	None	251	10–13	
Mar 22	vs San Diego State*		Excite Ballpark • San Jose, CA	**W** 7–5	**Pudvar (2–2)**	Belardes (1–3)	**Hale (1)**	306	11–13	
Mar 22	at San Jose State*		Excite Ballpark • San Jose, CA	**W** 8–0	**Hale (4–0)**	Smith (1–3)	None	387	12–13	
Mar 25	Quinnipiac*		Elliot Ballpark • Storrs, CT	**L** 3–8	Hiller (1–1)	**Trumpour (0–2)**	None	290	12–14	
Mar 27	Xavier		Elliot Ballpark • Storrs, CT	**W** 3–1	**West (3–2)**	Piech (3–3)	**Shaw III (1)**	289	13–14	1–0
Mar 28	Xavier		Elliot Ballpark • Storrs, CT	**W** 8–0	**Suchy (1–1)**	Vasiliou (0–1)	None	279	14–14	2–0
Mar 29	Xavier		Elliot Ballpark • Storrs, CT	**L** 1–6	Chronister (1–2)	**Pudvar (2–3)**	Helsel (3)	437	14–15	2–1
Mar 31	at Northeastern*		Parsons Field • Brookline, MA	**W** 21–5 ^{(7)}	**Talarico (1–0)**	Cropper (0–1)	None	193	15–15	

April (11–5)
Date	Opponent	Rank	Site/Stadium	Score	Win	Loss	Save	Attendance	Overall Record	BE Record
Apr 2	Creighton		Elliot Ballpark • Storrs, CT	**L** 1–3	Adams (2–1)	**West (3–3)**	Burke (2)	301	15–16	2–2
Apr 3	Creighton		Elliot Ballpark • Storrs, CT	**W** 11–2	**Suchy (2–1)**	Pineau (3–1)	None	413	16–16	3–2
Apr 4	Creighton		Elliot Ballpark • Storrs, CT	**W** 11–9	**Shaw III (4–0)**	Curtin (0–3)	None	521	17–16	4–2
Apr 7	at Bryant*		Conaty Park • Smithfield, RI	**W** 6–2	**Meyers (1–3)**	Mulhol (0–1)	None	142	18–16	
Apr 10	at Butler		Bulldog Park • Indianapolis, IN	**L** 4–5	Hagen (2–0)	**Meyers (1–4)**	None	237	18–17	4–3
Apr 11	at Butler		Bulldog Park • Indianapolis, IN	**W** 3–1	**Suchy** (3–1)	Winders (2–3)	None	448	19–17	5–3
Apr 12	at Butler		Bulldog Park • Indianapolis, IN	**W** 13–0 ^{(7)}	**Purdar** (3–3)	Buckle (2–6)	None	250	20–17	6–3
Apr 15	at No. 24 Boston College*		Eddie Pellagrini Diamond • Brighton, MA	**L** 5–8	Kipp (1–3)	**Gilchrist** (0–1)	Mitchell (1)	179	20–18	
Apr 17	St. John's		Elliot Ballpark • Storrs, CT	**L** 0–4	O'Leary (5–3)	**West (3–4)**	None	910	20–19	6–4
Apr 18	St. John's		Elliot Ballpark • Storrs, CT	**L** 5–6	Hoeckel (1–1)	**Shaw III (4–1)**	Frede (3)	918	20–20	6–5
Apr 18	St. John's		Elliot Ballpark • Storrs, CT	**W** 10–0 ^{(7)}	**Pudvar (3–3)**	Mowad (2–4)	None	1,308	21–20	7–5
Apr 21	Rhode Island*		Dunkin' Donuts Park • Hartford, CT	**W** 9–5	**Hale (5–0)**	Kopetski (1–2)	**Meyers (4)**	986	22–20	
Apr 24	at Georgetown		Capital One Park • Tysons, VA	**W** 14–2	**West (4–4)**	Raab (2–4)	None	217	23–20	8–5
Apr 25	at Georgetown		Capital One Park • Tysons, VA	**W** 22–4	**Suchy (4–1)**	Seid (5–4)	None	117	24–20	9–5
Apr 26	at Georgetown		Capital One Park • Tysons, VA	**W** 3–2	**Pudvar (5–3)**	Rucker (0–5)	**Hale (2)**	222	25–20	10–5
Apr 28	at Rutgers*		Bainton Field • Piscataway, New Jersey	**W** 5–4	**Hale (6–0)**	Kane (1–2)	**Meyers (5)**	427	26–20	

May (6–4)
Date	Opponent	Rank	Site/Stadium	Score	Win	Loss	Save	Attendance	Overall Record	BE Record
May 1	East Tennessee State*		Elliot Ballpark • Storrs, CT	**L** 7–14	Scott (3–4)	**West (4–5)**	None	426	26–21	
May 2	East Tennessee State*		Elliot Ballpark • Storrs, CT	**L** 1–6	Bell (5–2)	**Suchy (4–2)**	Curless (4)	810	26–22	
May 3	East Tennessee State*		Elliot Ballpark • Storrs, CT	**W** 4–3	**Pudvar (6–3)**	Jones (3–3)	**Shaw III (2)**	610	27–22	
May 8	at Seton Hall		Owen T. Carroll Field • South Orange, NJ	**W** 4–3	**West (5–5)**	Svenson (2–6)	**Meyers (6)**	145	28–22	11–5
May 9	at Seton Hall		Owen T. Carroll Field • South Orange, NJ	**W** 13–1	**Hale (7–0)**	Kuhn (1–3)	None	117	29–22	12–5
May 10	at Seton Hall		Owen T. Carroll Field • South Orange, NJ	**W** 7–3	**Pudvar (7–3)**	Christopher (4–5)	**Shaw III (3)**	234	30–22	13–5
May 12	Northeastern*		Elliot Ballpark • Storrs, CT	**L** 6–10	McSweeney (2–1)	**Hamberger (0–1)**	Rogovic	612	30–23	
May 14	Villanova		Elliot Ballpark • Storrs, CT	**W** 6–5	**West (6–5)**	Podgorski (1–4)	**Shaw III (4)**	469	31–23	14–5
May 15	Villanova		Elliot Ballpark • Storrs, CT	**W** 8–0	**Suchy (5–2)**	Kelley (2–8)	None		32–23	15–5
May 16	Villanova		Elliot Ballpark • Storrs, CT	**L** 6–9	Moore (5–0)	**Pudvar (7–4)**	None	1,081	32–24	15–6

Post-Season

Big East Tournament (0–2)
Date	Opponent	Rank	Site/Stadium	Score	Win	Loss	Save	Attendance	Overall Record	BET Record
May 20	(3) Xavier	(2)	Prasco Park • Mason, OH	**L** 1–5	Piech (8–3)	**West (6–6)**	None		32–25	0–1
May 21	(4) Creighton	(2)	Prasco Park • Mason, OH	**L** 4–7	Mager (3–1)	**Suchy (5–3)**	Wendt (1)	3,423	32–26	0–2

Rankings from D1Baseball. Parentheses indicate tournament seedings.

== Rankings ==
Ranking movements Legend: ██ Increase in ranking ██ Decrease in ranking — = Not ranked RV = Received votes
	Week																
Poll	Pre	1	2	3	4	5	6	7	8	9	10	11	12	13	14	15	Final
Coaches'	RV	RV*															
Baseball America	—	—															
NCBWA†	RV	—															
D1Baseball	—	—															
Perfect Game	—	—															

† NCBWA ranks 30 teams in their preseason poll, but only ranks 25 teams weekly during the season.
* A new poll was not released for this week, so for comparison purposes, the previous week's ranking is inserted in this week's slot.
