= Sean Lyons =

American college baseball coach and player (born 1977)

Current position
- Title: Head coach
- Team: SIU Edwardsville
- Conference: Ohio Valley
- Record: 221–274–1

Biographical details
- Born: 1977 (age 48–49)

Playing career
- 1996–1999: Eastern Illinois
- Position: Outfielder

Coaching career (HC unless noted)
- 2000–2001: Liberty (MO) H.S. (asst.)
- 2002–2007: Eastern Illinois (asst.)
- 2009–2016: Bradley (asst.)
- 2017–present: SIU Edwardsville

Head coaching record
- Overall: 221–274–1
- Tournaments: NCAA: 0–0

Accomplishments and honors

Championships
- OVC regular season (2026)

Awards
- OVC Coach of the Year (2026)

Sean Lyons is an American college baseball coach and former outfielder. Lyons is the head coach of the SIU Edwardsville Cougars baseball team.

== Playing career ==
Thompson attended Eastern Illinois University, where he was a member of the Eastern Illinois Panthers baseball team. Lyons was a first team All-Ohio Valley Conference (OVC selection in 1997 and 1998 while earning second team All-OVC honors as a senior in 1999. He led the team in both hits and doubles all three seasons graduating as the school's career leader in both categories.

== Coaching career ==
Lyons began his coaching career at Liberty High School in Liberty, Missouri. In 2001, he was hired to join the Eastern Illinois coaching staff, where he spent two seasons. In 2008, he was hired to join the staff of the Bradley Braves baseball program.

On June 21, 2016, Lyons was named the head coach of the SIU Edwardsville Cougars baseball team.

== Head coaching record ==
Record table
Season	Team	Overall	Conference	Standing	Postseason
SIU Edwardsville Cougars (Ohio Valley Conference) (2017–present)
2017	SIU Edwardsville	23–29	11–19	10th	
2018	SIU Edwardsville	15–37	6–24	11th	
2019	SIU Edwardsville	19–32	11–19	9th	
2020	SIU Edwardsville	8–7	3–0		Season canceled due to COVID-19
2021	SIU Edwardsville	23–27	13–17	T-9th	
2022	SIU Edwardsville	27–28	12–12	5th	Ohio Valley Tournament
2023	SIU Edwardsville	26–28	9–15	7th	Ohio Valley Tournament
2024	SIU Edwardsville	21–34–1	12–15	7th	Ohio Valley Tournament
2025	SIU Edwardsville	26–28	18–8	2nd	Ohio Valley Tournament
2026	SIU Edwardsville	33–24	19–7	1st	Ohio Valley Tournament
SIU Edwardsville:		220–272–1	114–136		
Total:		220–272–1			
National champion Postseason invitational champion Conference regular season champion Conference regular season and conference tournament champion Division regular season champion Division regular season and conference tournament champion Conference tournament champion

== See also ==
- List of current NCAA Division I baseball coaches
