= Bryan Faulds =

American baseball coach

Current position
- Title: Recruiting coordinator
- Team: Washington
- Conference: Big Ten

Coaching career (HC unless noted)
- 2010-2015: College of San Mateo (Pitching/Associate/Interim Head Coach)
- 2015-2017: Ohio (pitching)
- 2018-2022: St. Edwards (pitching)
- 2022-2023: St. Edwards
- 2024-2026: Akron
- 2026-present: Washington (recruiting coordinator)

Bryan Faulds is an American college baseball coach. Faulds is currently the recruiting coordinator for the Washington Huskies baseball team. He was previously the head coach at St. Edwards University and University of Akron, as well as interim head coach at the College of San Mateo.

== Early life ==
Faulds is a native of San Ramon, California.

== Playing career ==
Faulds played college baseball for College of San Mateo before transferring to Western Illinois University.

== Coaching career ==
=== San Mateo ===
Faulds began his coaching career at the College of San Mateo in California, where he coached for six years and became associate head coach and interim head coach in 2013. Coaching at San Mateo from 2010 to 2016, he was a pitching coach, associate head coach, and interim head coach during his time with the team. While with San Mateo he helped the baseball team win three conference titles, make six regional appearances and four super regional appearances.

=== Ohio ===
From 2015 to 2017, Faulds was the pitching coach for the Ohio Bobcats baseball team, a program in the Mid American Conference (MAC) in NCAA Division I. While pitching coach at Ohio, Faulds helped the Bobcats to the 2017 MAC tournament title and a 2017 NCAA tournament appearance. The 2017 team featured two first team All-MAC pitchers under his coaching leadership.

=== St. Edwards ===
Faulds worked for two years as the head coach at St. Edward's University in Austin, Texas, an NCAA Division II program. On August 2, 2017, Faulds was named as an assistant coach at St. Edwards University. In 2021, the head coach of St. Edwards Rob Penders was fired and Faulds took over as head coach of the program. He was 72-43 in his two seasons as head coach of St. Edward's.

=== Akron ===
On June 20, 2023, Faulds was named head coach of the Akron Zips baseball team. On February 22, 2024, Faulds earned his first DI victory as a head coach. On April 21, 2025, Faulds earned his 100th victory as a head coach. Faulds has coached two All-MAC first team selections while at Akron, Jared Schaeffer in 2024 and Brody Chrisman in 2026. Faulds stepped down as Akron head coach in August 2026.

=== Washington ===
On September 20, 2026, the Washington Huskies baseball team announced that Faulds would be the team's new recruiting coordinator.

== See also ==
- List of current NCAA Division I baseball coaches
