= Rich Witten =

American baseball player and coach (born 1988)

Biographical details
- Born: July 12, 1988 (age 38); Danville, Kentucky, U.S.

Playing career
- 2008–2012: Coastal Carolina
- Position: Catcher

Coaching career (HC unless noted)
- 2014: Miami (FL) (Vol)
- 2015–2017: Winthrop (H/C)
- 2018–2022: VCU (H/IF/RC)
- 2023–2026: FIU

Administrative career (AD unless noted)
- 2013: UCF (DoBO)

Head coaching record
- Overall: 98–126
- Tournaments: NCAA: 0–0

Richard Witten (born July 12, 1988) is an American baseball coach and former catcher, who was the head baseball coach of the FIU Panthers. He played college baseball at Coastal Carolina.

== Playing career ==
Witten attended Danville High School in Danville, Kentucky and played college baseball at Coastal Carolina.

== Coaching career ==
Witten began his coaching career as a volunteer assistant coach at Miami (FL). In 2015, Witten became an assistant coach at Winthrop. Following a 3-year stint as an assistant with the Eagles, he took an assistant position with the VCU Rams.

On June 23, 2022, Witten was named the head coach of the FIU Panthers.

== Head coaching record ==
Record table
Season	Team	Overall	Conference	Standing	Postseason
FIU Panthers (Conference USA) (2023–2026)
2023	FIU	21–34	8–22	T-9th	
2024	FIU	27–30	11–13	6th	
2025	FIU	31–27	13–13	6th	C-USA tournament
2026	FIU	19–35	10–20	10th	
FIU:		98–126	42–68		
Total:		98–126			
National champion Postseason invitational champion Conference regular season champion Conference regular season and conference tournament champion Division regular season champion Division regular season and conference tournament champion Conference tournament champion
