= 2026 Coastal Athletic Association baseball tournament =

American college baseball tournament

- Teams: 6
- Format: modified Double-elimination tournament
- Finals site: Brooks Field; Wilmington, North Carolina
- Champions: Northeastern (3rd title)
- Winning coach: Mike Glavine (2nd title)
- MVP: Andrew Wertz (Northeastern)
- Television: FloSports

2026 Coastal Athletic Association baseball standings
	Conf.				Overall
Team	W		L	PCT	W		L	PCT
Campbell ‍†‍‍	26	–	4	.867	39	–	15	.722
Northeastern ‍‍‡‍^{y}	22	–	8	.733	34	–	19	.642
Monmouth ‍‍‍	20	–	10	.667	29	–	21	.580
Charleston ‍‍‍	18	–	12	.600	28	–	26	.519
UNC Wilmington ‍‍‍	16	–	14	.533	28	–	26	.519
Hofstra ‍‍‍	14	–	16	.467	20	–	27	.426
Stony Brook ‍‍‍	13	–	17	.433	21	–	30	.412
William & Mary ‍‍‍	12	–	18	.400	21	–	32	.396
Elon ‍‍‍	10	–	20	.333	20	–	33	.377
Towson ‍‍‍	9	–	21	.300	22	–	32	.407
North Carolina A&T ‍‍‍	5	–	25	.167	14	–	38	.269
† – Conference champion ‡ – Tournament champion y – Invited to the NCAA Tournament; As of May 17, 2026; Rankings from D1Baseball

The 2026 Coastal Athletic Association baseball tournament was held at Brooks Field in Wilmington, North Carolina, from May 20 through 24. The Northeastern Huskies won the championship game against the Campbell Fighting Camels and earned the conference's automatic bid to the 2026 NCAA Division I baseball tournament.

== Seeding and format ==
Continuing the format adopted in 2012, the top six finishers from the regular season competed in the modified double-elimination tournament in which each round is reseeded so that the top remaining seed plays the lowest remaining seed.

== Bracket ==
Upper round 1	Upper round 2	Upper final	Final
1	Campbell	3
4	Charleston	0	6	UNC Wilmington	1
5	Hofstra	13^{(7)}	1	Campbell	5
5	Hofstra	3
2	Northeastern	0
3	Monmouth	0	5	Hofstra	6
6	UNC Wilmington	5
1	Campbell	4	2
2	Northeastern	7	3
Lower round 1	Lower round 2	Lower round 3	Lower final
2	Northeastern	5
2	Northeastern	7	5	Hofstra	4
3	Monmouth	1	6	UNC Wilmington	3
4	Charleston	2	6	UNC Wilmington	6
3	Monmouth	7

== Schedule ==
Game	Time*	Matchup^{#}	Score	Notes	Reference
Wednesday, May 20
1	12:00 pm	No. 4 College of Charleston vs No. 5 Hofstra	0−13^{(7)}		
2	4:00 pm	No. 3 Monmouth vs No. 6 UNC Wilmington	0−5		
Thursday, May 21
3	11:00 am	No. 4 College of Charleston vs No. 3 Monmouth	2−7	College of Charleston Eliminated	
4	3:00 pm	No. 1 Campbell vs No. 6 UNC Wilmington	3−1		
5	7:00 pm	No. 2 Northeastern vs No. 5 Hofstra	0−6		
Friday, May 22
6	5:00 pm	No. 3 Monmouth vs No. 6 UNC Wilmington	1−6	Monmouth Eliminated	
7	8:45 pm	No. 6 UNC Wilmington vs No. 2 Northeastern	3−7	UNC Wilmington Eliminated	
Saturday, May 23
8	11:00 am	No. 1 Campbell vs No. 5 Hofstra	5−3		
9	1:00 pm	No. 2 Northeastern vs No. 5 Hofstra	5−4	Hofstra Eliminated	
10	5:00 pm	No. 1 Campbell vs No. 2 Northeastern	4−7		
Sunday, May 24
11	1:00 pm	No. 1 Campbell vs No. 2 Northeastern	2−3	Northeastern wins CAA championship	
*Game times in EDT. # – Rankings denote tournament seed.

== All–Tournament Team ==
Player	Team
Carlos Lugo	Campbell
Jonah Oster	Campbell
David Rossow	Campbell
Carlos Martinez	Hofstra
Gabriel Melara	Hofstra
Harrison Feinberg	Northeastern
Ryan Gerety	Northeastern
Luc Rising	Northeastern
**Andrew Wertz**	Northeastern
Cooper Allen	UNCW
Mason Ruh	UNCW

MVP in bold
