= 2026 Mid-American Conference baseball tournament =

American collegiate baseball tournament

- Teams: 6
- Format: Double-elimination
- Finals site: ForeFront Field; Avon, Ohio
- Champions: Northern Illinois (1st title)
- Winning coach: Ryan Copeland (1st title)
- MVP: Max Vaisvila (Northern Illinois)
- Television: ESPN+

2026 Mid-American Conference baseball standings
	Conf.				Overall
Team	W		L	PCT	W		L	PCT
Miami (OH) ‍†‍‍	25	–	8	.758	38	–	15	.717
Kent State ‍‍‍	24	–	9	.727	39	–	13	.750
Toledo ‍‍‍	21	–	12	.636	29	–	27	.518
Northern Illinois ‍‍‡‍^{y}	21	–	12	.636	31	–	17	.646
Western Michigan ‍‍‍	20	–	13	.606	26	–	23	.531
Ball State ‍‍‍	18	–	15	.545	23	–	28	.451
Central Michigan ‍‍‍	13	–	10	.565	22	–	29	.431
UMass ‍‍‍	13	–	20	.394	18	–	29	.383
Eastern Michigan ‍‍‍	12	–	21	.364	19	–	34	.358
Bowling Green ‍‍‍	12	–	21	.364	17	–	34	.333
Akron ‍‍‍	11	–	22	.333	20	–	34	.370
Ohio ‍‍‍	8	–	25	.242	11	–	43	.204
† – Conference champion ‡ – Tournament champion y – Invited to the NCAA Tournament; As of May 17, 2026; Rankings from D1Baseball

The 2026 Mid-American Conference baseball tournament is a postseason baseball tournament for the Mid-American Conference for the 2026 NCAA Division I baseball season, held on May 20–24 at ForeFront Field in Avon, Ohio. The winner will earn the conference's automatic bid to the 2026 NCAA Division I baseball tournament.

== Seeding and format ==
The top six finishers of the league's twelve teams qualified for the double-elimination tournament. Teams were seeded based on conference winning percentage, with the first tiebreaker being head-to-head record.

Seed	School	Conference record	Tiebreaker
1	Miami (OH)	25–8	—
2	Kent State	24–9	—
3	Toledo	21–12	2–1 vs. NIU
4	Northern Illinois	21–12	1–2 vs. Toledo
5	Western Michigan	20–13	—
6	Ball State	18–15	—

== Bracket ==
Upper round 1	Upper round 2	Upper final	Final
Game 4
Game 1	1	Miami (OH)	5
3	Toledo	8	4	Northern Illinois	6^{(15)}	Game 7
6	Ball State	2	4	Northern Illinois	10
Game 5	3	Toledo	3
Game 2	3	Toledo	8
4	Northern Illinois	11^{(7)}	2	Kent State	0
5	Western Michigan	0
4	Northern Illinois	5	−
3	Toledo	1	−
Lower round 1	Lower round 2	Lower round 3	Lower final
Game 9
Game 8	2	Kent State	2
Game 6	5	Western Michigan	1	3	Toledo	5
Game 3	2	Kent State	3	2	Kent State	6
6	Ball State	6	1	Miami (OH)	1
5	Western Michigan	8

== Schedule ==
Game	Time*	Matchup^{#}	Score	Notes	Reference
Wednesday, May 20
1	12:30 p.m.	No. 3 Toledo vs. No. 6 Ball State	8−2		
2	6:00 p.m.	No. 4 Northern Illinois vs. No. 5 Western Michigan	11−0^{(7)}		
Thursday, May 21
3	10:00 a.m.	No. 6 Ball State vs. No. 5 Western Michigan	6−8	Ball State eliminated	
4	2:00 p.m.	No. 1 Miami(OH) vs. No. 4 Northern Illinois	5−6^{(15)}		
5	8:10 p.m.	No. 2 Kent State vs. No. 3 Toledo	0−8		
Friday, May 22
6	9:00 am	No. 1 Miami (OH) vs. No. 2 Kent State	1−3	Miami (OH) eliminated	
7	1:00 pm	No. 2 Kent State vs. No. 5 Western Michigan	6−1	Western Michigan eliminated	
8	4:45 pm	No. 3 Toledo vs. No. 4 Northern Illinois	3−10		
Saturday, May 23
9	12:30 pm	No. 2 Kent State vs. No. 3 Toledo	2−5	Kent State eliminated	
10	6:00 pm	No. 4 Northern Illinois vs. No. 3 Toledo	5−1	MAC Tournament Championship	

== All–Tournament Team ==
Player	Team
Ciaran Caughey	Kent State
Alejandro Covas	Kent State
Gavin Baldwin	Northern Illinois
Cooper Cohn	Northern Illinois
Carter Cox	Northern Illinois
Cole Smith	Northern Illinois
**Max Vaisvila**	Northern Illinois
Michael Fliss	Toledo
Nathan Leininger	Toledo
Troy Sudbrook	Toledo

MVP in bold
