= 2026 West Coast Conference baseball tournament =

- Teams: 6
- Format: Single-elimination/Double-elimination
- Finals site: Scottsdale Stadium; Scottsdale, Arizona
- Champions: Saint Mary's (3rd title)
- Winning coach: Eric Valenzuela (3rd title)
- MVP: Ian Armstrong (Saint Mary's)
- Television: ESPN+

2026 West Coast Conference baseball standings
	Conf.						Overall
Team	W		L		T	PCT	W		L		T	PCT
Gonzaga ‍†‍‍	22	–	5	–	0	.815	35	–	17	–	0	.673
Pacific ‍‍‍	15	–	11	–	1	.574	23	–	28	–	1	.452
San Francisco ‍‍‍	15	–	12	–	0	.556	24	–	28	–	0	.462
Pepperdine ‍‍‍	15	–	12	–	0	.556	21	–	32	–	0	.396
Saint Mary's ‍‍‡‍^{y}	15	–	12	–	0	.556	30	–	24	–	0	.556
Santa Clara ‍‍‍	13	–	14	–	0	.481	25	–	28	–	0	.472
Portland ‍‍‍	13	–	14	–	0	.481	27	–	25	–	0	.519
San Diego ‍‍‍	12	–	14	–	1	.463	20	–	30	–	1	.402
Seattle ‍‍‍	11	–	16	–	0	.407	17	–	31	–	0	.354
Loyola Marymount ‍‍‍	3	–	24	–	0	.111	12	–	44	–	0	.214
† – Conference champion ‡ – Tournament champion y – Invited to the NCAA Tournament; As of May 17, 2026; Rankings from D1Baseball

The 2026 West Coast Conference baseball tournament was held from May 20 through 23 at Scottsdale Stadium in Scottsdale, Arizona, Arizona. The top six regular season finishers of the conference's nine teams met in the tournament, with the top 2 teams receiving a bye to the double-elimination rounds.

The Saint Mary's Gaels won the tournament.

== Seeding and format ==
The top six finishers of the league's nine teams qualify for the conference tournament. Teams are seeded based on conference winning percentage, with the first tiebreaker being head-to-head record.

== Bracket ==
Upper round 1
3	San Francisco	10
6	Santa Clara	4
4	Pepperdine	2
5	Saint Mary's	9

Upper round 2
1	Gonzaga	4
5	Saint Mary's	13
2	Pacific	8
3	San Francisco	4
Lower round 2
1	Gonzaga	5
3	San Francisco	6

Upper final
5	Saint Mary's	10
2	Pacific	7
Lower final
3	San Francisco	10
2	Pacific	6

Final
5	Saint Mary's	8	7
3	San Francisco	9	6

== Schedule ==
Game	Time*	Matchup^{#}	Score	Notes	Reference
Wednesday, May 20
1	2:00 pm	No. 6 Santa Clara vs No. 3 San Francisco	4–10	Santa Clara Eliminated	
2	7:00 pm	No. 5 Saint Mary's vs No. 4 Pepperdine	9–2	Pepperdine Eliminated	
Thursday, May 21
3	2:00 pm	No. 5 Saint Mary's vs No. 1 Gonzaga	13–4		
4	7:00 pm	No. 3 San Francisco vs No. 2 Pacific	4–8		
Friday, May 22
5	10:00 am	No. 1 Gonzaga vs. vs No. 3 San Francisco		Elimination Game	
6	2:00 pm	No. 5 Saint Mary's vs No. 2 Pacific			
7	7:00 pm	Game 5 Winner vs Game 6 Loser		Elimination Game	
Saturday, May 23
8	1:00 pm	Game 6 Winner vs Game 7 Winner			
9	50 minutes after Game 8 (if necessary)	Game 8 Winner vs Game 8 Loser		Elimination Game (if necessary)	
