= Joey Hammond =

American baseball coach and utility player

Current position
- Title: Head coach
- Team: High Point
- Conference: Big South
- Record: 154–133 (.537)

Biographical details
- Born: October 27, 1977 (age 49); Frederick, Maryland, U.S.

Playing career
- 1996–1998: Charlotte
- 1998: Delmarva Shorebirds
- 1998–2001: Frederick Keys
- 1998: Bluefield Orioles
- 2001–2005: Bowie Baysox
- 2002: Rochester Red Wings
- 2003–2004, 2007: Ottawa Lynx
- 2006–2008: Reading Phillies
- 2008: Lehigh Valley IronPigs
- Position: Utility player

Coaching career (HC unless noted)
- 2010–2014: Westchester Country Day School
- 2015–2021: Wake Forest (H/OF)
- 2022–present: High Point

Head coaching record
- Overall: 154–133 (.537)
- Tournaments: Big South: 7–6 (.538); NCAA: 1–2 (.333)

Accomplishments and honors

Championships
- Big South tournament (2024); Big South regular season (2026)

Awards
- First Team All-Conference USA (1997); Big South Coach of the Year (2026)

Joseph Sidney Hammond (born October 27, 1977) is an American baseball coach and former utility player, who is the current head baseball coach of the High Point Panthers. He played college baseball at Charlotte for head coach Loren Hibbs from 1996 to 1998 before playing professionally from 1998 to 2008.

== Playing career ==
Hammond attended Governor Thomas Johnson High School and played college baseball at Charlotte.

== Coaching career ==
Hammond began his coaching career at Westchester Country Day School. He then became and assistant coach at Wake Forest.

On June 17, 2021, Hammond was named the head coach of the High Point Panthers.

== Head coaching record ==
Record table
Season	Team	Overall	Conference	Standing	Postseason
High Point Panthers (Big South Conference) (2022–present)
2022	High Point	23–33	14–10	4th	Big South Tournament
2023	High Point	20–34	12–15	T-6th	
2024	High Point	35–27	17–7	2nd	NCAA Regional
2025	High Point	39–19	18–6	2nd	Big South Tournament
2026	High Point	37–20	17–7	1st	Big South Tournament
High Point:		154–133 (.537)	78–45 (.634)		
Total:		154–133 (.537)			
National champion Postseason invitational champion Conference regular season champion Conference regular season and conference tournament champion Division regular season champion Division regular season and conference tournament champion Conference tournament champion
