= 2026 Big East Conference baseball tournament =

American college baseball tournament

- Teams: 4
- Format: Double-elimination tournament
- Finals site: Prasco Park; Mason, Ohio
- Champions: St. John's (11th title)
- MVP: Rocco Gump (St. John's)
- Television: ESPN+

2026 Big East Conference baseball standings
	Conf.				Overall
Team	W		L	PCT	W		L	PCT
St. John's ‍†‍‡‍^{y}	15	–	6	.714	36	–	26	.581
UConn ‍†‍‍	15	–	6	.714	32	–	26	.552
Xavier ‍†‍‍	15	–	6	.714	28	–	30	.483
Creighton ‍‍‍	13	–	8	.619	31	–	26	.544
Georgetown ‍‍‍	9	–	12	.429	28	–	28	.500
Butler ‍‍‍	9	–	12	.429	20	–	34	.370
Villanova ‍‍‍	5	–	16	.238	19	–	30	.388
Seton Hall ‍‍‍	3	–	18	.143	16	–	30	.348
† – Conference champion ‡ – Tournament champion y – Invited to the NCAA tournament As of June 30, 2026; Rankings from D1Baseball

The 2026 Big East Conference Baseball Tournament was held at Prasco Park in Mason, Ohio, from May 20 through May 23. The event, held at the end of the conference regular season, determined the champion of the Big East Conference for the 2026 season. The winner of the double-elimination tournament received the conference's automatic bid to the 2026 NCAA Division I baseball tournament. The St. John's Red Storm won the tournament with a 5–3 win over the Creighton Bluejays on May 24, 2026. This was the 11th conference tournament championship for St. John's, with the team's third baseman Rocco Gump receiving the 2026 Jack Kaiser Award as the tournament's most outstanding player.

== Format and seeding ==
The tournament used a double-elimination format and featured the top four finishers of the Big East's eight teams from the conference's round robin regular season. St. John's claimed the top seed and UConn the second seed over tiebreaker with tri-champion Xavier, who earned the third seed.

Team	W	L	Pct.	GB	Seed	Tiebreaker
St. John's	15	6	.714	—	1	4–2 vs. UConn and Xavier
UConn	15	6	.714	—	2	3–3 vs. St. John's and Xavier
Xavier	15	6	.714	—	3	2–4 vs. St. John's and UConn
Creighton	13	8	.619	2	4	
Georgetown	9	12	.429	6	—	
Butler	9	12	.429	6	—	
Villanova	5	16	.238	10	—	
Seton Hall	3	18	.143	12	—	

== Bracket ==
First Round
1	St. John's	4
4	Creighton	2
3	Xavier	5
2	UConn	1
Lower round 1
4	Creighton	7
2	UConn	4

Semi-Finals
1	St. John's	17
3	Xavier	6
Lower final
4	Creighton	7
3	Xavier	4

Finals
1	St. John's	5	–
4	Creighton	3	–

== Schedule ==
Game	Time*	Matchup^{#}	Score	Notes	Reference
Thursday, May 21
1	12:00 pm	No. 4 Creighton vs. No. 1 St. John's	2−4		
2	4:00 p.m.	No. 3 Xavier vs. No. 2 UConn	4−2		
3	7:30 p.m.	No. 4 Creighton vs. No. 2 UConn	7−4	UConn eliminated	
Saturday, May 23
4	2:00 p.m.	No. 1 St. John's vs. No. 3 Xavier	17−6		
5	6:00 p.m.	No. 4 Creighton vs. No. 3 Xavier	7−4	Xavier eliminated	
Sunday, May 24
6	9:00 a.m.	No. 1 St. John's vs. No. 4 Creighton	5−3	St. John's wins Big East tournament	
*Game times in EDT. # – Rankings denote tournament seed.
