= 2025 West Coast Conference baseball tournament =

- Teams: 6
- Format: Single-elimination/Double-elimination
- Finals site: Las Vegas Ballpark; Las Vegas, Nevada
- Champions: Saint Mary's (2nd title)
- Winning coach: Eric Valenzuela (2nd title)
- MVP: Eddie Madrigal (Saint Mary's)
- Television: ESPN+

2025 West Coast Conference baseball standings
	Conf.				Overall
Team	W		L	PCT	W		L	PCT
San Diego ‍†‍‍	19	–	5	.792	28	–	30	.483
Gonzaga ‍‍‍	16	–	8	.667	26	–	27	.491
Saint Mary's ‍‍‡‍^{y}	15	–	9	.625	36	–	26	.581
Loyola Marymount ‍‍‍	14	–	10	.583	29	–	29	.500
Portland ‍‍‍	13	–	11	.542	22	–	30	.423
San Francisco ‍‍‍	9	–	15	.375	26	–	30	.464
Pacific ‍‍‍	8	–	16	.333	20	–	36	.357
Santa Clara ‍‍‍	7	–	17	.292	20	–	30	.400
Pepperdine ‍‍‍	7	–	17	.292	12	–	42	.222
† – Conference champion ‡ – Tournament champion y – Invited to the NCAA Tournament; As of June 1, 2025; Rankings from D1Baseball

The 2025 West Coast Conference baseball tournament was held from May 21 through 24 at Las Vegas Ballpark in Las Vegas, Nevada. The top six regular season finishers of the conference's nine teams met in the tournament, with the top 2 teams receiving a bye to the double-elimination rounds. The tournament winner, the St. Mary's Gaels, earned the league's automatic bid to the 2025 NCAA Division I baseball tournament.

== Seeding and format ==
The top six finishers of the league's nine teams qualify for the conference tournament. Teams are seeded based on conference winning percentage, with the first tiebreaker being head-to-head record.

== Bracket ==
Upper round 1
3	Saint Mary's	9
6	San Francisco	4
4	Loyola Marymount	12
5	Portland	8

Upper round 2
1	San Diego	3
4	Loyola Marymount	8
2	Gonzaga	6
3	St. Mary's	14
Lower round 2
1	San Diego	16
2	Gonzaga	7

Upper final
4	Loyola Marymount	11
3	St. Mary's	18
Lower final
4	Loyola Marymount	8
1	San Diego	14

Final
3	St. Mary's	13	9
1	San Diego	16 ^{(14)}	8

== Schedule ==
Game	Time*	Matchup^{#}	Score	Notes	Reference
Wednesday, May 21
1	2:00 pm	No. 6 San Francisco vs No. 3 Saint Mary's	3−9	San Francisco Eliminated	
2	6:00 pm	No. 5 Portland vs No. 4 Loyola Marymount	8−12	Portland Eliminated	
Thursday, May 22
3	2:00 pm	No. 4 Loyola Marymount vs No. 1 San Diego	8−3		
4	6:00 pm	No. 3 Saint Mary's vs No. 2 Gonzaga	14−6		
Friday, May 23
5	12:00 pm	No. 2 Gonzaga vs No. 1 San Diego	7-16	Gonzaga Eliminated	
6	4:05 pm	No. 4 Loyola Marymount vs No. 3 Saint Mary's	11-18		
7	8:10 pm	No. 4 Loyola Marymount vs No. 1 San Diego	8-14	Loyola Marymount Eliminated	
Saturday, May 24
8	1:00 pm	No. 3 Saint Mary's vs No. 1 San Diego	13-16		
9	7:15 pm	No. 3 Saint Mary's vs No. 1 San Diego	9-8	San Diego eliminated	

== All–Tournament Team ==
Player	Team
Beau Ankeney	Loyola Marymount
Nate Savoie	Loyola Marymount
Jack Gurevitch	San Diego
Aden Howard	San Diego
Rex Watson	San Diego
Daniel Guevara Castro	Saint Mary's
Dylan Delvecchio	Saint Mary's
**Eddie Madrigal**	Saint Mary's
Jared Mettam	Saint Mary's
Ryan Pierce	Saint Mary's

MVP in bold
