= Queens Royals baseball =

Queens Royals
- 2026 Queens Royals baseball team
- University: Queens University of Charlotte
- Head coach: James Cullinane (1st season)
- Conference: Atlantic Sun Conference; Graphite Division
- Location: Charlotte, North Carolina
- Home stadium: Stick Williams Dream Baseball Field
- Nickname: Royals
- Colors: Navy blue and vegas gold

The Queens Royals baseball team is the varsity intercollegiate athletic team of the Queens University of Charlotte in Charlotte, North Carolina, United States. The team competes in the National Collegiate Athletic Association's Division I and is a member of the Atlantic Sun Conference since 2022. They will become full members in the 2026 season after finishing the four-year NCAA Division I reclassification period.
