= Manny Roman =

American college baseball coach

Current position
- Title: Head coach
- Team: Fairleigh Dickinson
- Conference: NEC
- Record: 73–88–1 (.454)

Biographical details
- Born: 1988 or 1989 (age 37–38); Carolina, Puerto Rico

Playing career
- 2008–2011: Keystone
- Position: Pitcher

Coaching career (HC unless noted)
- 2012: Marywood (V)
- 2014–2015: Lackawanna (P/RC)
- 2016: Monroe (P)
- 2017: Raritan Valley
- 2018–2021: Monroe (P)
- 2022: Fairleigh Dickinson (P)
- 2023–present: Fairleigh Dickinson

Head coaching record
- Overall: 73–88–1 (.454) 4–25–0 (.138) (NJCAA)
- Tournaments: 0–0

Accomplishments and honors

Awards
- NEC Coach of the Year (2026)

Emmanuel Roman-Castillo (born 1988 or 1989) is a Puerto Rican baseball coach and former pitcher, who is the current head baseball coach of the Fairleigh Dickinson Knights. He played college baseball at Keystone College from 2008 to 2011. He was also the head baseball coach of the Raritan Valley Golden Lions (2017).

== Coaching career ==
On June 16, 2022, Roman was promoted from assistant coach to head coach of the Fairleigh Dickinson.

== Head coaching record ==
Record table
Season	Team	Overall	Conference	Standing	Postseason
Raritan Valley Golden Lions (Garden State Athletic Conference) (2017)
2017	Raritan Valley	4–25	1–9	10th	
Raritan Valley:		4–25	1–9		
Fairleigh Dickinson Knights (Northeast Conference) (2023–present)
2023	Fairleigh Dickinson	31–21–1	20–10	3rd	Northeast Tournament
2024	Fairleigh Dickinson	26–30	18–14	6th	Northeast Tournament
2025	Fairleigh Dickinson	16–37	16–14	6th	
Fairleigh Dickinson:		73–88–1	54–38		
Total:		73–88–1			
National champion Postseason invitational champion Conference regular season champion Conference regular season and conference tournament champion Division regular season champion Division regular season and conference tournament champion Conference tournament champion
