= 2026 Horizon League baseball tournament =

- Teams: 5
- Format: Double-elimination
- Finals site: Nischwitz Stadium; Fairborn, Ohio
- Champions: Milwaukee (5th title)
- Winning coach: Shaun Wegner (1st title)
- MVP: Joey Spence (Milwaukee)
- Television: ESPN+

2026 Horizon League baseball standings
	Conf.				Overall
Team	W		L	PCT	W		L	PCT
Wright State ‍†‍‍	17	–	7	.708	25	–	26	.490
Milwaukee ‍‍‡‍^{y}	14	–	10	.583	22	–	31	.415
Northern Kentucky ‍‍‍	12	–	12	.500	24	–	28	.462
Youngstown State ‍‍‍	12	–	12	.500	15	–	38	.283
Oakland ‍‍‍	5	–	19	.208	10	–	40	.200
† – Conference champion ‡ – Tournament champion y – Invited to the NCAA Tournament; As of May 17, 2026; Rankings from D1Baseball

The 2026 Horizon League baseball tournament will be held from May 20 through 23 at Nischwitz Stadium in Fairborn, Ohio. All five teams in the league qualify for the double-elimination tournament. The champion will earn an automatic bid to the 2026 NCAA Division I baseball tournament. Defending champion Wright State holds the most titles with 11.

== Seeding and format ==
All of the league's five teams qualify for the tournament. Teams are seeded based on conference winning percentage, with the first tiebreaker being head-to-head record. The two lowest seeds will play a single-elimination play-in game. The remaining teams and the play-in winner then play a double-elimination tournament.

== Bracket ==
Play-In Game
4	Youngstown State	3
5	Oakland	10

Quarterfinals
1	Wright State	7
5	Oakland	5
2	Milwaukee	14
3	Northern Kentucky	2
Lower round 2
3	Northern Kentucky	3
5	Oakland	5

Semifinals
1	Wright State	1
2	Milwaukee	4
Lower final
1	Wright State	5
5	Oakland	11

Finals
2	Milwaukee	5	-
5	Oakland	4	-

== Schedule ==
Game	Time*	Matchup^{#}	Score	Notes	Reference
Wednesday, May 20
1	5:00 pm	No. 5 Oakland vs. No. 4 Youngstown State	10–3	Youngstown State Eliminated	
Thursday, May 21
2	11:00 am	No. 3 Northern Kentucky vs. No. 2 Milwaukee	2–14		
3	3:00 pm	No. 5 Oakland vs. No. 1 Wright State	5–7		
4	7:00 pm	No. 5 Oakland vs. No. 3 Northern Kentucky	5–3	Northern Kentucky eliminated	
Friday, May 22
5	9:00 am	No. 2 Milwaukee vs. No. 1 Wright State	4–1		
Saturday, May 23
6	TBD	No. 5 Oakland vs. No. 1 Wright State		Loser eliminated	
7	TBD	No. 2 Milwaukee vs. Winner Game 6		Championship Game	
8	TBD	Winner Game 7 vs. Loser Game 7		If necessary	
