= 2026 Virginia Cavaliers baseball team =

American college baseball season

2026 Virginia Cavaliers baseball

NCAA Hattiesburg Regional, 1–2
- Conference: Atlantic Coast Conference
- Record: 37–23 (14–16 ACC)
- Head coach: Chris Pollard (1st season)
- Hitting coach: Eric Tyler (1st season)
- Pitching coach: Brady Kirkpatrick (1st season)
- Home stadium: Davenport Field

2026 Atlantic Coast Conference baseball standings
	Conf.						Overall
Team	W		L		T	PCT	W		L		T	PCT
No. 10 Georgia Tech ‍†‍‡‍^{y}	25	–	5	–	0	.833	50	–	11	–	0	.820
No. 2 North Carolina ‍‍‍^{y}	22	–	8	–	0	.733	54	–	14	–	1	.790
No. 18 Florida State ‍‍‍^{y}	19	–	11	–	0	.633	40	–	19	–	0	.678
Boston College ‍‍‍^{y}	17	–	13	–	0	.567	40	–	24	–	0	.625
Wake Forest ‍‍‍^{y}	16	–	14	–	0	.533	39	–	21	–	0	.650
Miami (FL) ‍‍‍^{y}	16	–	14	–	0	.533	39	–	20	–	0	.661
Virginia Tech ‍‍‍^{y}	15	–	15	–	0	.500	30	–	26	–	0	.536
Virginia ‍‍‍^{y}	14	–	16	–	0	.467	37	–	23	–	0	.617
NC State ‍‍‍^{y}	14	–	16	–	0	.467	32	–	24	–	0	.571
Louisville ‍‍‍	13	–	17	–	0	.433	30	–	27	–	0	.526
Notre Dame ‍‍‍	13	–	17	–	0	.433	31	–	22	–	0	.585
Stanford ‍‍‍	13	–	17	–	0	.433	28	–	26	–	0	.519
California ‍‍‍	12	–	18	–	0	.400	29	–	26	–	0	.527
Pittsburgh ‍‍‍	11	–	19	–	0	.367	33	–	24	–	0	.579
Clemson ‍‍‍	10	–	20	–	0	.333	31	–	26	–	0	.544
Duke ‍‍‍	10	–	20	–	0	.333	26	–	31	–	0	.456
† – Conference champion ‡ – Tournament champion y – Invited to the NCAA Tournament; As of June 23, 2026; Rankings from D1Baseball

The 2026 Virginia Cavaliers baseball team represents the University of Virginia in the 2026 NCAA Division I baseball season.

The Cavaliers play their home games at Davenport Field at Disharoon Park in Charlottesville, Virginia. It is Chris Pollard's first season as head coach of the Cavaliers. The team is a member of the Atlantic Coast Conference.

== Previous Season ==
Last season, under the leadership of Brian O'Connor, the team went 32–18 overall, and 16–11 in ACC Conference play. The Cavaliers were eliminated from the ACC tournament by Boston College and missed the NCAA tournament for the first time since 2019.

Following the season, O'Connor left to take over the head coaching position at Mississippi State. On June 10, 2025, Virginia announced the hiring of Duke head coach and Amherst County native Chris Pollard as O'Connor's replacement.

== Preseason ==
=== Coaches poll ===
ACC coaches poll
Predicted finish	Team	Votes (1st place)
1	Georgia Tech	237 (7)
2	North Carolina	236 (6)
3	Florida State	221 (1)
4	Louisville	196
5	Clemson	185 (2)
6	NC State	169
7	Virginia	165
8	Miami	159
9	Wake Forest	145
10	Stanford	99
11	Virginia Tech	89
12	Notre Dame	87
13	Duke	67
14	Pittsburgh	45
15	California	41
16	Boston College	35

== Roster ==
2026 Virginia Cavaliers baseball team
Players
Coaches

#	Pos.	Name	B/T	Height	Weight	Year	Home town
0	C	Will Broderick	L/R	6 ft 1 in (1.85 m)	190 lb (86 kg)	So	(Texas) San Antonio
1	INF	Noah Murray	R/R	5 ft 10 in (1.78 m)	170 lb (77 kg)	Fr	(Virginia) Crozet
2	RHP	Matt Augustin	R/R	6 ft 3 in (1.91 m)	215 lb (98 kg)	Jr	(New Jersey) Cherry Hill
3	UTL	Noah Jouras	R/R	6 ft 0 in (1.83 m)	200 lb (91 kg)	Gr	(Illinois) Western Springs
4	OF	Griffin Enis	R/R	6 ft 1 in (1.85 m)	200 lb (91 kg)	Fr	(Mississippi) Corinth
5	INF	Kyle Johnson	R/L	6 ft 1 in (1.85 m)	205 lb (93 kg)	Jr	(Virginia) Leesburg
6	INF	RJ Holmes	R/R	6 ft 1 in (1.85 m)	190 lb (86 kg)	Fr	(California) Menifee
7	INF	Jayden Stroman	S/R	6 ft 1 in (1.85 m)	197 lb (89 kg)	Jr	(New York (state)) Medford
8	C	Thomas O'Connell	L/R	5 ft 10 in (1.78 m)	190 lb (86 kg)	Jr	(Connecticut) Sharon
9	LHP	Henry Zatkowski	L/L	6 ft 2 in (1.88 m)	190 lb (86 kg)	So	(Maryland) Clarksville
10	RHP	Kevin Jaxel	R/R	6 ft 5 in (1.96 m)	220 lb (100 kg)	Sr	(New York (state)) Congers
12	RHP	Charlie Oschell	R/R	6 ft 5 in (1.96 m)	225 lb (102 kg)	Jr	(Pennsylvania) Phoenixville
13	OF	Zach Jackson	L/R	6 ft 1 in (1.85 m)	170 lb (77 kg)	So	(Georgia (country)) Smyrna
15	OF	Will Mahala	L/R	6 ft 2 in (1.88 m)	195 lb (88 kg)	Fr	(New Jersey) Far Hills
16	RHP	Jake Weatherspoon	R/R	6 ft 2 in (1.88 m)	210 lb (95 kg)	Jr	(Florida) Melbourne
18	INF	Sam Harris	L/L	6 ft 5 in (1.96 m)	220 lb (100 kg)	Jr	(Iowa) Urbandale
19	C	Aiden Harris	R/R	6 ft 4 in (1.93 m)	240 lb (109 kg)	So	(Virginia) Midlothian
20	INF	Noah Yoder	R/R	6 ft 6 in (1.98 m)	235 lb (107 kg)	Fr	(Virginia) Mechanicsville
21	INF	Eric Becker	L/R	6 ft 3 in (1.91 m)	190 lb (86 kg)	Jr	(New York (state)) Thiells
22	RHP	Joe Colucci	R/R	6 ft 5 in (1.96 m)	220 lb (100 kg)	Sr	(Virginia) Purcellville
23	RHP	John Paone	R/R	6 ft 3 in (1.91 m)	210 lb (95 kg)	Fr	(Massachusetts) Lexington
25	INF	Joe Tiroly	R/R	6 ft 0 in (1.83 m)	200 lb (91 kg)	Jr	(Pennsylvania) Yardley
27	RHP	Drew Koenen	R/R	6 ft 3 in (1.91 m)	235 lb (107 kg)	Jr	(Illinois) Park Ridge
28	RHP	Lucas Hartman	R/R	5 ft 10 in (1.78 m)	211 lb (96 kg)	Gr	(Florida) Bradenton
29	OF	AJ Gracia	L/L	6 ft 3 in (1.91 m)	195 lb (88 kg)	Jr	(New Jersey) Monroe
30	LHP	Brendan Cowen	L/L	6 ft 4 in (1.93 m)	200 lb (91 kg)	So	(Virginia) Leesburg
32	OF	LJ Edwards	L/L	6 ft 1 in (1.85 m)	205 lb (93 kg)	Fr	(Florida) Lake Helen
33	C	Bryce Neely	R/R	5 ft 11 in (1.8 m)	190 lb (86 kg)	Fr	(Virginia) Midlothian
34	OF	Harrison Didawick	L/L	6 ft 4 in (1.93 m)	215 lb (98 kg)	Sr	(Virginia) Chesapeake
35	RHP	Michael Yeager	R/R	6 ft 3 in (1.91 m)	215 lb (98 kg)	So	(Connecticut) Greenwich
36	RHP	Christopher Worley	R/R	6 ft 1 in (1.85 m)	205 lb (93 kg)	Fr	(Michigan) Grand Blanc
37	LHP	Tommy Roldan	L/L	6 ft 1 in (1.85 m)	210 lb (95 kg)	Jr	(Maryland) Poolesville
38	LHP	Dean Kampschror	L/L	6 ft 5 in (1.96 m)	215 lb (98 kg)	Gr	(Virginia) Falls Church
39	RHP	Ryan Prior	R/R	6 ft 3 in (1.91 m)	215 lb (98 kg)	Fr	(New Jersey) Sea Girt
40	RHP	Tyler Kapa	R/R	6 ft 2 in (1.88 m)	195 lb (88 kg)	Gr	(Michigan) Waterford
41	UTL	Thomas Stewart	R/R	6 ft 2 in (1.88 m)	190 lb (86 kg)	Fr	(Colorado) Lakewood
43	RHP	Ben Shulman	R/R	6 ft 5 in (1.96 m)	220 lb (100 kg)	Fr	(New York (state)) Chappaqua
44	INF	Antonio Perrotta	L/L	6 ft 4 in (1.93 m)	230 lb (104 kg)	Jr	(Maryland) Rockville
46	RHP	Christian Lucarelli	R/R	6 ft 3 in (1.91 m)	210 lb (95 kg)	Fr	(Pennsylvania) Beaver Falls
47	RHP	Nate Bassett	R/R	6 ft 3 in (1.91 m)	210 lb (95 kg)	Jr	(Virginia) Bristow
51	LHP	Max Stammel	L/L	6 ft 3 in (1.91 m)	205 lb (93 kg)	So	(Texas) Dallas

Head coach

Chris Pollard

Assistant coach(es)

Brady Kirkpatrick
Derek Simmons
Eric Tyler

Legend

- (C) Team captain
- (S) Suspended
- (I) Ineligible
- Injured
- Current redshirt

Roster
Last update: February 17, 2026

== Rankings ==
Ranking movements Legend: ██ Increase in ranking ██ Decrease in ranking — = Not ranked RV = Received votes
	Week																	
Poll	Pre	1	2	3	4	5	6	7	8	9	10	11	12	13	14	15	16	Final
Coaches'	22	22*	RV	RV	16	12	11	14	14	12	12	24	25	RV	—	RV	RV*	
Baseball America	14	14	12	11	9	9	9	19	25	23	24	—	—	—	—	—*	—*	
NCBWA†	24	24	24	25	18	12	11	19	20	19	14	23	22	RV	RV	RV*	RV	
D1Baseball	—	—	—	—	14	9	9	10	13	9	10	23	23	—	—	—	—*	
Perfect Game	14	14	14	15	10	9	9	12	17	16	17	24	24	—	—	—*	—*	

† NCBWA ranks 30 teams in their preseason poll, but only ranks 25 teams weekly during the season.
* A new poll was not released for this week, so for comparison purposes, the previous week's ranking is inserted in this week's slot.

== Schedule ==
2026 Virginia Cavaliers baseball game log (37–23)
Regular season (35–20)

February (9–1)
Date	TV	Opponent	Rank	Stadium	Score	Win	Loss	Save	Attendance	Overall	ACC
February 13	ACCNX	Wagner*		Davenport Field; Charlottesville, VA	W 13–7	Hartman (1–0)	Steventon (0–1)	None	3,318	1–0	—
February 14	ACCNX	Wagner*; Double Header		Davenport Field	W 25–10	Stammel (1–0)	Brandt (0–1)	None	3,615	2–0	—
February 14	ACCNX	Wagner*; Double Header		Davenport Field	W 31–8	Koenen (1–0)	Townsend (0–1)	None	3,141	3–0	–
February 17	ACCNX	VMI*		Davenport Field	W 5–2	Jaxel (1–0)	Driscoll (0–1)	Kapa (1)	3,202	4–0	–
February 20		vs. Monmouth*		Melching Field; DeLand, FL	W 21–8 (8)	Jaxel (2–0)	Mealy (0–1)	Kapa (2)	739	5–0	–
February 21		at Stetson		Melching Field	L 5-6	Coppersmith (1-0)	Kapa (0-1)	None	1,178	5-1	-
February 22		vs. North Dakota State*		Melching Field	W 5-4	Hartman (2-0)	Hudson (0-1)	None	275	6-1	-
February 24	ACCNX	George Washington*		Davenport Field	W 11-0 (7)	Lucarelli (1-0)	Murphy (0-1)	None	3,057	7-1	-
February 27	ACCNX	VCU*		Davenport Field	W 5-3	Zatkowski (1-0)	Peters (1-1)	Kapa (3)	3,358	8-1	-
February 28	ACCNX	VCU*		Davenport Field	'W 7-6 (11)	Kapa (1-1)	Campbell (0-1)	None	3,859	9-1	-

March (14–6)
Date	TV	Opponent	Rank	Stadium	Score	Win	Loss	Save	Attendance	Overall	ACC
March 1	ESPN+	at VCU*		The Diamond; Richmond, VA	W 5-3	Paone (1-0)	DiGiacomo (0-2)	None	1,413	10-1	-
March 3	ESPN+	at Charlotte*		Hayes Stadium; Charlotte, NC	L 0-14	Oxborrow (1-0)	Yeager (0-1)	None	1,012	10-2	-
March 4	ESPN+	vs. Charlotte*		Atrium Health Ballpark; Kannapolis, NC	W 8-1	Hartman (3-0)	Jones (1-2)	None	1,152	11-2	-
March 6	ACCNX	at No. 8 North Carolina		Boshamer Stadium; Chapel Hill, NC	W 13-3 (7)	Zatkowski (2-0)	Decaro (3-1)	None	3,848	12-2	1-0
March 7 (DH Game 1)	ACCNX	at No. 8 North Carolina		Boshamer Stadium	W 9-2	Stammel (1-0)	Lynch (1-1)	None	3,504	13-2	2-0
March 7 (DH Game 2)	ACCNX	at No. 8 North Carolina		Boshamer Stadium	L 7-8 (12)	Matthijs (1-0)	Lucarelli (1-1)	None	2,283	13-3	2-1
March 10	ACCNX	William & Mary*	No. 14	Davenport Field	W 9–7	Hartman (4–0)	McCarthy (0–1)	Kapa (3)	3,388	14–3	-
March 13	ACCNX	Virginia Tech	No. 14	Davenport Field	W 11–6	Zatkowski (3–0)	Yagesh (1–1)	None	4,078	15–3	3–1
March 14	ACCNX	Virginia Tech	No. 14	Davenport Field	W 10-5	Stammel (2-0)	Renfrow (0-3)	None	4,519	16-3	4-1
March 15	ACCNX	Virginia Tech	No. 14	Davenport Field	L 3–6	Stieg (1–1)	Paone (1–1)	Crowl (1)	4,111	16–4	4–2
March 17	ACCNX	Georgetown*	No. 9	Davenport Field	W 6–4	Jaxel (4–0)	Rucker (0–2)	Kapa (4)	3,019	17–4	-
March 18	ESPN+	at Liberty*	No. 9	Liberty Baseball Stadium; Lynchburg, VA	W 14-12	Augustin (1-0)	Decker-Petty (1-3)	None	1,076	18-4	-
March 20	ACCNX	No. 24 Wake Forest	No. 9	Davenport Field	W 10–6	Zatkowski (4–0)	Morningstar (2–3)	None	3,762	19–4	5–2
March 21	ACCNX	No. 24 Wake Forest	No. 9	Davenport Field	L 4–13	Levonas (5–1)	Stammel (2–1)	None	4,261	19–5	5–3
March 22	ACCN	No. 24 Wake Forest	No. 9	Davenport Field	W 14–4 (8)	Yoder (1–0)	Jones (1–1)	None	3,993	20–5	6–3
March 24	ACCNX	vs. Maryland*	No. 9	Virginia Credit Union Stadium; Fredericksburg, VA	W 16-6 (8)	Augustin (2-0)	Bailey (0-2)	Kapa (5)	2,305	21-5	-
March 27	ACCNX	at Boston College	No. 9	Eddie Pellagrini Diamond; Chestnut Hill, MA	L 3–5	Colarusso (2–1)	Johnson (0–1)	Gonzalez (1)	400	21–6	6–4
March 28	ACCNX	at Boston College	No. 9	Eddie Pellagrini Diamond	L 0–17 (7)	Mudd (2–2)	Stammel (2–2)	None	1,128	21–7	6–5
March 29	ACCNX	at Boston College	No. 9	Eddie Pellagrini Diamond	W 3–1	Hartman (5–0)	Soares (0–1)	Kapa (6)	2,563	22–7	7–5
March 31	ACCNX	Old Dominion*	No. 10	Davenport Field	W 16–2 (7)	Yoder (2–0)	Hubbell (0–1)	None	3,707	23–7	-

April (7–9)
Date	TV	Opponent	Rank	Stadium	Score	Win	Loss	Save	Attendance	Overall	ACC
April 2	ACCN	No. 7 Florida State	No. 10	Davenport Field	W 4–3	Zatkowski (5–0)	Mendes (6–2)	Kapa (7)	4,341	24–7	8–5
April 3	ACCNX	No. 7 Florida State	No. 10	Davenport Field	L 2–5	Beard (3–0)	Stammel (2–3)	Abraham (4)	5,141	24–8	8–6
April 4	ACCNX	No. 7 Florida State	No. 10	Davenport Field	L 3–9	Moore (5–1)	Paone (1–2)	None	4,707	24–9	8–7
April 7	ACCNX	James Madison*	No. 13	Davenport Field	L 7–8 (10)	McGrath (2–1)	Kapa (1–2)	Madden (1)	3,992	24–10	-
April 10	ACCNX	at Notre Dame	No. 13	Frank Eck Stadium; South Bend, IN	W 8-4	Hartman (6-0)	Uber (4-2)	None	489	25-10	9-7
April 11	ACCNX	at Notre Dame	No. 13	Frank Eck Stadium	L 3–5	Redel (4–2)	Stammel (2–4)	Jaisie (1)	1,014	25–11	9–8
April 12	ACCNX	at Notre Dame	No. 13	Frank Eck Stadium	W 20–5 (8)	Hartman (7–0)	Singleton (0–2)	None	745	26–11	10–8
April 14	ESPN+	at VCU*	No. 9	The Diamond	L 2–6	Newman (3–1)	Yeager (0–2)	None	982	26–12	-
April 16	ACCN	Clemson	No. 9	Davenport Field	W 6–4	Zatkowski (6–0)	Knaak (2–4)	Kapa (8)	3,671	27–12	11–8
April 17	ACCNX	Clemson	No. 9	Davenport Field	L 1–5	Sharman (5–1)	Jaxel (4–1)	None	4,216	27–13	11–9
April 18	ACCNX	Clemson	No. 9	Davenport Field	W 5–4	Hartman (8–0)	Nelson (1–3)	Kapa (9)	5,077	28–13	12–9
April 22	ACCNX	Liberty*	No. 10	Davenport Field	W 5–4	Stewart (1–0)	Potts (2–2)	Kapa (10)	3,539	29–13	-
April 24	ACCNX	at Pittsburgh	No. 10	Charles L. Cost Field; Pittsburgh, PA	L 5–7	Kriebel (2–1)	Hartman (8–1)	Smink (3)	381	29–14	12–10
April 25	ACCNX	at Pittsburgh	No. 10	Charles L. Cost Field	L 0–11 (7)	Beruvides Jr. (1–0)	Johnson (0–2)	None	477	29–15	12–11
April 26	ACCNX	at Pittsburgh	No. 10	Charles L. Cost Field	L 3–7	Gray (4–0)	Paone (1–3)	Leslie (1)	377	29–16	12–12
April 28	ACCNX	George Mason*	No. 23	Davenport Field	W 5–1	Hartman (9–1)	Kaler (1–2)	Kapa (11)	3,288	30–16	-
April 29	ACCNX	Norfolk State*	No. 23	Davenport Field	Canceled (inclement weather)						

May (5–4)
Date	TV	Opponent	Rank	Stadium	Score	Win	Loss	Save	Attendance	Overall	ACC
May 3	ACCNX	Radford*; Double Header	No. 23	Davenport Field	W 11–1 (7)	Johnson (1–2)	Lefevers (5–2)	None	4,085	31–16	-
May 3	ACCNX	Radford*; Double Header	No. 23	Davenport Field	W 14–5	Stammel (3–4)	Steinhaus (1–4)	None	4,176	32–16	-
May 8	ACCNX	California	No. 23	Davenport Field	L 4–7	de la Torre (5–5)	Zatkowski (6–1)	Clark (4)	3,960	32–17	12–13
May 9	ACCNX	California	No. 23	Davenport Field	W 2–1	Kapa (2–2)	Colombara (0–2)	None	4,285	33–17	13–13
May 10	ACCNX	California	No. 23	Davenport Field	L 7–8	Clark (3–3)	Hartman (9–2)	Roach (1)	3,839	33–18	13–14
May 12	ACCNX	Richmond*		Davenport Field	W 16–6 (8)	Hartman (10–2)	Morris (0–1)	None	3,655	34–18	-
May 14	ACCNX	at Louisville		Jim Patterson Stadium; Louisville, KY	W 8–3	Zatkowski (7–1)	Eberle (3–4)	None	2,681	35–18	14–14
May 15	ACCNX	at Louisville		Jim Patterson Stadium	L 2–12 (8)	Hartman (4–2)	Paone (1–4)	None	3,235	35–19	14–15
May 16	ACCNX	at Louisville		Jim Patterson Stadium	L 5–10	Murphy (1–2)	Johnson (1–3)	England (1)	2,782	35–20	14–16

Postseason (2–3)

ACC tournament (1–1)
Date	TV	Opponent	Rank	Stadium	Score	Win	Loss	Save	Attendance	Overall	ACCT
May 20	ACCN	vs. (16) Duke	(8)	Truist Field; Charlotte, NC	W 6–4	Zatkowski (8–1)	Weaver (4–9)	Hartman (1)	1,186	36–20	1–0
May 21	ACCN	vs. (1) No. 3 Georgia Tech	(8)	Truist Field	L 10–16	Patel (4–0)	Stammel (3–5)	None	2,906	36–21	1–1

Hattiesburg Regional (1–2)
Date	TV	Opponent	Rank	Stadium	Score	Win	Loss	Save	Attendance	Overall	NCAAT
May 29	ESPN+	vs. (3) No. 21 Jacksonville State	(2)	Pete Taylor Park; Hattiesburg, MS	L 7–15	McDougall (5–0)	Zatkowski (8–2)	None	5,331	36–22	0–1
May 30	ESPN+	vs. (1) No. 9 Southern Miss	(2)	Pete Taylor Park	W 15–11 (10)	Stammel (4–5)	Crabtree (2–3)	None	5,331	37–22	1–1
May 31	ESPN+	vs. (3) No. 21 Jacksonville State	(2)	Pete Taylor Park	L 6–7	Cash (9–2)	Stammel (4–6)	Sibley (1)	5,331	37–23	1–2

Legend: = Win = Loss = Canceled
Bold =Virginia team member
Rankings are based on the team's current ranking in the D1Baseball poll or NCAA tournament seeding for postseason play.
