= 2026 Conference USA baseball tournament =

- Teams: 9
- Format: Pool play
- Finals site: Mickey Dunn Stadium; Kennesaw, GA
- Champions: Jacksonville State (1st title)
- Winning coach: Steve Bieser (1st title)
- MVP: Sam Richardson (Jacksonville State)
- Television: ESPN+, CBS Sports Network (final only)

2026 Conference USA baseball standings
| | Conf. | | | | Overall |
| Team | W | | L | PCT | W | | L | PCT |
|---|---|---|---|---|---|---|---|---|
| Jacksonville State ‍†‍‡‍^{y} | 23 | – | 7 | .767 | 42 | – | 13 | .764 |
| Liberty ‍‍‍^{y} | 21 | – | 9 | .700 | 38 | – | 18 | .679 |
| Missouri State ‍‍‍^{y} | 20 | – | 10 | .667 | 32 | – | 18 | .640 |
| Dallas Baptist ‍‍‍ | 19 | – | 11 | .633 | 31 | – | 24 | .564 |
| Louisiana Tech ‍‍‍ | 19 | – | 11 | .633 | 33 | – | 23 | .589 |
| Western Kentucky ‍‍‍ | 14 | – | 16 | .467 | 29 | – | 26 | .527 |
| Kennesaw State ‍‍‍ | 13 | – | 17 | .433 | 25 | – | 26 | .490 |
| Sam Houston ‍‍‍ | 13 | – | 17 | .433 | 24 | – | 32 | .429 |
| Middle Tennessee ‍‍‍ | 12 | – | 18 | .400 | 26 | – | 29 | .473 |
| FIU ‍‍‍ | 10 | – | 20 | .333 | 19 | – | 35 | .352 |
| New Mexico State ‍‍‍ | 9 | – | 21 | .300 | 18 | – | 34 | .346 |
| Delaware ‍‍‍ | 7 | – | 23 | .233 | 19 | – | 35 | .352 |
† – Conference champion ‡ – Tournament champion y – Invited to the NCAA Tournament; As of May 17, 2026; Rankings from D1Baseball

The 2026 Conference USA baseball tournament will be held from May 20 through 24 at the newly-built Mickey Dunn Stadium in Kennesaw, GA. The top nine regular season finishers of the conference's ten teams will meet in the pool play tournament, and will be split into three pools of 3 teams each, before the top 4 seeds by pool record will advance to single elimination semifinals and championship game. This format is a departure from recent tournaments, which featured 8-team double-elimination brackets.

== Seeding and format ==
The top nine finishers of the league's twelve teams qualify for the pool play tournament. Teams are seeded based on conference winning percentage, with the first tiebreaker being head-to-head record.

== Pool Play ==
=== Pool A ===
| Pos | Team | Pld | W | L | RF | RA | RD | PCT | Qualification |
|---|---|---|---|---|---|---|---|---|---|
| 1 | No. 1 Jacksonville State | 2 | 2 | 0 | 21 | 14 | +7 | 1.000 | Advance to Playoff round |
| 2 | No. 6 Western Kentucky | 2 | 1 | 1 | 19 | 14 | +5 | .500 | Eliminated |
| 3 | No. 9 Middle Tennessee | 2 | 0 | 2 | 5 | 17 | −12 | .000 | Eliminated |

=== Pool B ===
| Pos | Team | Pld | W | L | RF | RA | RD | PCT | Qualification |
|---|---|---|---|---|---|---|---|---|---|
| 1 | No. 2 Liberty | 2 | 2 | 0 | 16 | 4 | +12 | 1.000 | Advance to Playoff round |
| 2 | No. 8 Sam Houston | 2 | 1 | 1 | 18 | 23 | −5 | .500 | Eliminated |
| 3 | No. 5 Louisiana Tech | 2 | 0 | 2 | 13 | 20 | −7 | .000 | Eliminated |

=== Pool C ===
| Pos | Team | Pld | W | L | RF | RA | RD | PCT | Qualification |
|---|---|---|---|---|---|---|---|---|---|
| 1 | No. 3 Missouri State | 2 | 2 | 0 | 15 | 12 | +3 | 1.000 | Advance to Playoff round |
| 2 | No. 4 Dallas Baptist | 2 | 1 | 1 | 14 | 9 | +5 | .500 | Advance to Playoff round |
| 3 | No. 7 Kennesaw State | 2 | 0 | 2 | 4 | 12 | −8 | .000 | Eliminated |

== Championship Round ==
Semifinals
2 | Liberty | 7
3 | Missouri State | 5
1 | Jacksonville State | 6
4 | Dallas Baptist | 5

Championship
2 | Liberty | 0
1 | Jacksonville State | 10(7)

== Schedule ==
| Game | Time | Matchup | Score | Notes | Reference |
(Pool Play) Wednesday, May 20
| 1 | 10:00 am | No. 8 Sam Houston vs. No. 5 Louisiana Tech | 14–13 | | |
| 2 | 1:30 pm | No. 7 Kennesaw State vs. No. 4 Dallas Baptist | 0–6 | | |
| 3 | 5:00 pm | No. 9 Middle Tennessee vs. No. 6 Western Kentucky | 2–8 | | |
(Pool Play) Thursday, May 21
| 4 | 10:00 am | No. 2 Liberty vs. No. 8 Sam Houston | 10–4 | | |
| 5 | 4:10 pm | No. 3 Missouri State vs. No. 7 Kennesaw State | 6–4 | | |
| 6 | 8:00 pm | No. 1 Jacksonville State vs. No. 9 Middle Tennessee | 9–3 | | |
(Pool Play) Friday, May 22
| 7 | 9:00 am | No. 5 Louisiana Tech vs. No. 2 Liberty | 0–6 | Liberty advances to Championship Round | |
| 8 | 12:30 pm | No. 6 Western Kentucky vs. No. 1 Jacksonville State | 11–12 | Jacksonville State advances to Championship Round | |
| 9 | 4:00 pm | No. 4 Dallas Baptist vs. No. 3 Missouri State | 8–9 | Both teams advance to Championship Round | |
Saturday, May 23
| 10 | 1:30 pm | No. 1 Jacksonville State vs. No. 4 Dallas Baptist | 6–5 | Dallas Baptist Eliminated | |
| 11 | 6:50 pm | No. 2 Liberty vs. No. 3 Missouri State | 7–5 (Note: Game suspended due to lightning and resumed on May 24 at 10:00 am) | Missouri State Eliminated | |
Sunday, May 24
| 12 | 1:00 pm | No. 1 Jacksonville State vs. No. 2 Liberty | 10–0 (F/7) | Jacksonville State wins CUSA championship | |

All times Eastern
