= 2026 Liberty Flames baseball team =

American college baseball season

2026 Liberty Flames baseball

Athens Regional, 2–2
- Conference: Conference USA
- Record: 43–21 (21–9 C-USA)
- Head coach: Bradley LeCroy (2nd season)
- Assistant coach: Andrew Cox (2nd season)
- Hitting coach: Matt Williams (3rd season)
- Pitching coach: Keller Bradford (1st season)
- Home stadium: Liberty Baseball Stadium

2026 Conference USA baseball standings
| | Conf. | | | | Overall |
| Team | W | | L | PCT | W | | L | PCT |
|---|---|---|---|---|---|---|---|---|
| No. 21 Jacksonville State ‍†‍‡‍^{y} | 23 | – | 7 | .767 | 42 | – | 13 | .764 |
| Liberty ‍‍‍^{y} | 21 | – | 9 | .700 | 38 | – | 18 | .679 |
| Missouri State ‍‍‍^{y} | 20 | – | 10 | .667 | 32 | – | 18 | .640 |
| Dallas Baptist ‍‍‍ | 19 | – | 11 | .633 | 31 | – | 24 | .564 |
| Louisiana Tech ‍‍‍ | 19 | – | 11 | .633 | 33 | – | 23 | .589 |
| Western Kentucky ‍‍‍ | 14 | – | 16 | .467 | 29 | – | 26 | .527 |
| Kennesaw State ‍‍‍ | 13 | – | 17 | .433 | 25 | – | 26 | .490 |
| Sam Houston ‍‍‍ | 13 | – | 17 | .433 | 24 | – | 32 | .429 |
| Middle Tennessee ‍‍‍ | 12 | – | 18 | .400 | 26 | – | 29 | .473 |
| FIU ‍‍‍ | 10 | – | 20 | .333 | 19 | – | 35 | .352 |
| New Mexico State ‍‍‍ | 9 | – | 21 | .300 | 18 | – | 34 | .346 |
| Delaware ‍‍‍ | 7 | – | 23 | .233 | 19 | – | 35 | .352 |
† – Conference champion ‡ – Tournament champion y – Invited to the NCAA Tournament; As of May 17, 2026; Rankings from D1Baseball

The 2026 Liberty Flames baseball team represented Liberty University during the 2026 NCAA Division I baseball season. The Flames played their home games at Liberty Baseball Stadium as members of Conference USA They were led by second-year head coach Bradley LeCroy.

== Previous season ==
The Flames are coming off a 30–27 (10–17) season. The Flames went 0–2 as the eight seed in the 2025 Conference USA baseball tournament.

== Preseason ==
=== Coaches poll ===
The coaches poll was released on January 29, 2026. Liberty was selected to finish seventh in the conference.

Coaches' Poll
| Predicted finish | Team | Points |
|---|---|---|
| 1 | Dallas Baptist | 144 (9) |
| 2 | Louisiana Tech | 111 (1) |
| 3 | Kennesaw State | 108 |
| 4 | Jacksonville State | 102 (1) |
| 5 | Western Kentucky | 97 |
| 6 | Missouri State | 90 |
| 7 | Liberty | 85 |
| 8 | FIU | 56 |
| 9 | New Mexico State | 45 (1) |
| 10 | Middle Tennessee | 38 |
| 11 | Delaware | 37 |
| 12 | Sam Houston | 26 |

=== Awards and honors ===
==== Preseason CUSA awards and honors ====
Preseason All-CUSA Team
| Player | No. | Position | Class | Designation |
| Tanner Marsh | 00 | INF | Yr | First Team |

== Personnel ==
=== Starters ===
Lineup
| Pos. | No. | Player. | Year |
|---|---|---|---|
| C | 20 | Lance Trippel | Senior |
| 1B | 9 | Eli Thomas | Freshman |
| 2B | 3 | Bradke Lohry | Senior |
| 3B | 10 | Jack Lutz | Freshman |
| SS | 1 | Jevin Relaford | Senior |
| LF | 18 | Jake Kulikowski | Junior |
| CF | 27 | Ryan Pruitt | Senior |
| RF | 6 | Jacob Green | Senior |
| DH | 26 | Nathan Earley | Senior |

Weekend pitching rotation
| Day | No. | Player. | Year |
|---|---|---|---|
| Friday | 19 | Michael Senay | Freshman |
| Saturday | 44 | Edwin Alicea | Junior |
| Sunday | 32 | Landen Yorek | Senior |

== Schedule ==
2026 Liberty Flames baseball game log (43–21)
Regular season (38–18)

February (6–3)
| Date | TV | Opponent | Rank | Stadium | Score | Win | Loss | Save | Attendance | Overall | C-USA |
|---|---|---|---|---|---|---|---|---|---|---|---|
| February 13 | ESPN+ | at The Citadel* | | Joseph P. Riley Jr. Park; Charleston, SC | **W** 7–3 | **Blair** (1–0) | Holmes (0–1) | None | 687 | 1–0 | — |
| February 14 | ESPN+ | at The Citadel* | | Joseph P. Riley Jr. Park | **L** 3–4 | Gibson (1–0) | Decker-Petty (0–1) | None | 739 | 1–1 | — |
| February 15 | ESPN+ | at The Citadel* | | Joseph P. Riley Jr. Park | **W** 5–4 | **Zayac** (1–0) | Brown (0–1) | None | 523 | 2–1 | — |
| February 20 | ESPN+ | No. 25 West Virginia* | | Liberty Baseball Stadium; Lynchburg, VA | **L** 0–12 | Cole (1–0) | **Blair** (1–1) | None | 1,370 | 2–2 | — |
| February 21 | ESPN+ | No. 25 West Virginia* | | Liberty Baseball Stadium | **L** 0–2 | Yehl (1–0) | **Lucas** (0–1) | Perez (2) | 2,390 | 2–3 | — |
| February 21 | ESPN+ | No. 25 West Virginia* | | Liberty Baseball Stadium | **W** 4–1 | **Zayac** (2–0) | Montesa (1–1) | **Potts** (1) | 2,390 | 3–3 | — |
| February 25 | ESPN+ | High Point* | | Liberty Baseball Stadium | **W** 9–3 | **Smith** (1–0) | Silverste (0–2) | None | 740 | 4–3 | — |
| February 27 | ESPN+ | Hofstra* | | Liberty Baseball Stadium | **W** 7–2 | **Blair** (2–1) | Hamilton (0–2) | **Swink** (1) | 797 | 5–3 | — |
| February 28 | ESPN+ | Hofstra* | | Liberty Baseball Stadium | **W** 13–2 ^{(7)} | **Lucas** (1–1) | Lacourcie (0–1) | None | 1,116 | 6–3 | — |

March (13–6)
| Date | TV | Opponent | Rank | Stadium | Score | Win | Loss | Save | Attendance | Overall | C-USA |
|---|---|---|---|---|---|---|---|---|---|---|---|
| March 1 | ESPN+ | Hofstra* | | Liberty Baseball Stadium | **W** 10–7 | **August** (1–0) | Sanderoff (0–1) | None | 909 | 7–3 | — |
| March 3 | ESPN+ | at High Point* | | George S. Erath Field; High Point, NC | **W** 8–0 | **Harrington** (1–0) | Wells (0–1) | None | 201 | 8–3 | — |
| March 6 | ESPN+ | Harvard* | | Liberty Baseball Stadium | **W** 9–3 | **Blair** (3–1) | Colasante (0–3) | None | 1,142 | 9–3 | — |
| March 7 | ESPN+ | Harvard* | | Liberty Baseball Stadium | **W** 11–7 | **Swink** (1–0) | Smith (0–1) | None | 1,033 | 10–3 | — |
| March 8 | ESPN+ | Harvard* | | Liberty Baseball Stadium | **W** 5–4 | **Decker-Petty** (1–1) | Sams (0–1) | None | 852 | 11–3 | — |
| March 10 | ESPN+ | at UNC Greensboro* | | UNCG Baseball Stadium; Greensboro, NC | **W** 12–10 | **Dietrich** (1–0) | Hester (0–2) | **August** (1) | 201 | 12–3 | — |
| March 13 | ESPN+ | Missouri State | | Liberty Baseball Stadium | **L** 3–4 | Ash (1–0) | **Swink** (1–1) | Charlton (2) | 847 | 12–4 | 0–1 |
| March 14 | ESPN+ | Missouri State | | Liberty Baseball Stadium | **L** 11–12 | Wade (1–1) | **Decker-Petty** (1–2) | Charlton (3) | 873 | 12–5 | 0–2 |
| March 15 | ESPN+ | Missouri State | | Liberty Baseball Stadium | **W** 9–3 | **Zayac** (3–0) | Slater (2–2) | **Harrington** (1) | 715 | 13–5 | 1–2 |
| March 17 | ACCNX | at No. 24 Wake Forest* | | David F. Couch Ballpark; Winston–Salem, NC | **L** 0–11 ^{(7)} | Bagwell (2–0) | **Potts** (0–1) | None | 1,911 | 13–6 | — |
| March 18 | ESPN+ | No. 9 Virginia* | | Liberty Baseball Stadium | **L** 12–14 | Augustin (1–0) | **Decker-Petty** (1–3) | None | 1,076 | 13–7 | — |
| March 20 | ESPN+ | at Kennesaw State | | Fred Stillwell Stadium; Kennesaw, GA | **W** 2–0 ^{(10)} | **August** (2–0) | Cain (2–1) | **Swink** (2) | 709 | 14–7 | 2–2 |
| March 21 | ESPN+ | at Kennesaw State | | Fred Stillwell Stadium | **W** 11–5 | **Potts** (1–1) | Summerville (0–1) | **Harrington** (2) | 634 | 15–7 | 3–2 |
| March 22 | ESPN+ | at Kennesaw State | | Fred Stillwell Stadium | **L** 3–4 | Powell (4–1) | **Swink** (1–2) | None | 548 | 15–8 | 3–3 |
| March 24 | ESPN+ | UNC Greensboro* | | Liberty Baseball Stadium | **L** 6–7 | Colucci (1–0) | **Decker-Petty** (1–4) | Dear (1) | | 15–9 | — |
| March 27 | ESPN+ | FIU | | Liberty Baseball Stadium | **W** 4–3 | **Blair** (4–1) | Prince (2–1) | **Swink** (3) | 894 | 16–9 | 4–3 |
| March 28 | ESPN+ | FIU | | Liberty Baseball Stadium | **W** 7–1 | **Lucas** (2–1) | Enrique (4–1) | None | 1,018 | 17–9 | 5–3 |
| March 29 | ESPN+ | FIU | | Liberty Baseball Stadium | **W** 13–0 ^{(7)} | **Zayac** (4–0) | Mlodzinski (2–5) | None | 793 | 18–9 | 6–3 |
| March 31 | ACCNX | at NC State* | | Doak Field; Raleigh, NC | **W** 7–5 | **August** (3–0) | Heintz (0–1) | **Harrington** (3) | 2,907 | 19–9 | — |

April (13–4)
| Date | TV | Opponent | Rank | Stadium | Score | Win | Loss | Save | Attendance | Overall | C-USA |
|---|---|---|---|---|---|---|---|---|---|---|---|
| April 2 | ESPN+ | at Western Kentucky | | Nick Denes Field; Bowling Green, KY | **W** 8–3 | **Potts** (2–1) | Serup (0–3) | **Harrington** (4) | 325 | 20–9 | 7–3 |
| April 3 | ESPN+ | at Western Kentucky | | Nick Denes Field | **W** 6–2 | **Blair** (5–1) | Robertson (1–2) | None | 359 | 21–9 | 8–3 |
| April 4 | | at Western Kentucky | | Nick Denes Field | **W** 6–5 | **Decker-Petty** (2–4) | Lawson (2–2) | **Harrington** (5) | 235 | 22–9 | 9–3 |
| April 7 | ACCNX | Virginia Tech* | | English Field; Blacksburg, VA | **W** 11–4 | **Evans** (1–0) | Roe (2–1) | None | 749 | 23–9 | — |
| April 10 | ESPN+ | Jacksonville State | | Liberty Baseball Stadium | **L** 4–8 | McDougall (3–0) | **Blair** (5–2) | Sleeper (2) | 2,090 | 23–10 | 9–4 |
| April 11 | ESPN+ | Jacksonville State | | Liberty Baseball Stadium | **W** 7–6 | **Harrington** (2–0) | Hutto (3–3) | None | 1,717 | 24–10 | 10–4 |
| April 12 | ESPN+ | Jacksonville State | | Liberty Baseball Stadium | **W** 4–2 | **Zayac** (5–0) | Cash (4–2) | **Harrington** (6) | 1,120 | 25–10 | 11–4 |
| April 14 | ACCNX | at Duke* | | Jack Coombs Field; Durham, NC | **W** 17–7 | **Evans** (2–0) | Bryan (1–2) | None | 548 | 26–10 | — |
| April 16 | ESPN+ | at Dallas Baptist | | Horner Ballpark; Dallas, TX | **W** 17–3 ^{(8)} | **Blair** (6–2) | Watt (5–2) | None | 1,628 | 27–10 | 12–4 |
| April 17 | ESPN+ | at Dallas Baptist | | Horner Ballpark | **L** 6–7 | Luzarraga (2–0) | **Harrington** (2–1) | Kroll (8) | 900 | 27–11 | 12–5 |
| April 18 | ESPN+ | at Dallas Baptist | | Horner Ballpark | **W** 9–8 | **August** (4–0) | Jenkins (2–3) | **Harrington** (7) | 1,051 | 28–11 | 13–5 |
| April 21 | ESPN+ | Duke* | | Liberty Baseball Stadium | **W** 13–10 | **Evans** (3–0) | DiGiacomo (1–1) | None | 1,456 | 29–11 | — |
| April 22 | ACCNX | at No. 10 Virginia* | | Davenport Field; Charlottesville, VA | **L** 4–5 | Stewart (1–0) | **Potts** (2–2) | Kapa (10) | 3,539 | 29–12 | — |
| April 24 | ESPN+ | Delaware | | Liberty Baseball Stadium | **L** 4–5 | Callaway (5–0) | **Blair** (6–3) | McLaughlin (1) | 1,502 | 29–13 | 13–6 |
| April 25 | ESPN+ | Delaware | | Liberty Baseball Stadium | **W** 11–5 | **Lucas** (3–1) | Marose (1–5) | **Dahlman** (1) | 1,115 | 30–13 | 14–6 |
| April 26 | ESPN+ | Delaware | | Liberty Baseball Stadium | **W** 14–4 ^{(8)} | **Zayac** (6–0) | Bryan (0–1) | None | 1,002 | 31–13 | 15–6 |
| April 28 | ESPN+ | Charlotte* | | Liberty Baseball Stadium | **W** 12–2 | **Evans** (4–0) | Jones (2–3) | None | 951 | 32–13 | — |

May (6–5)
| Date | TV | Opponent | Rank | Stadium | Score | Win | Loss | Save | Attendance | Overall | C-USA |
|---|---|---|---|---|---|---|---|---|---|---|---|
| May 1 | ESPN+ | at New Mexico State | | Presley Askew Field; Las Cruces, NM | **W** 15–4 | **Swink** (2–2) | Sneddon (1–4) | None | 762 | 33–13 | 16–6 |
| May 2 | ESPN+ | at New Mexico State | | Presley Askew Field | **W** 9–7 | **August** (5–0) | Ramos (1–1) | **Harrington** (8) | 341 | 34–13 | 17–6 |
| May 3 | ESPN+ | at New Mexico State | | Presley Askew Field | **W** 7–4 | **Zayac** (7–0) | Price (3–4) | **Harrington** (9) | 388 | 35–13 | 18–6 |
| May 6 | ESPN+ | Virginia Tech* | | Liberty Baseball Stadium | **L** 4–8 | Grim (2–4) | **Dahlman** (0–1) | None | 1,452 | 35–14 | — |
| May 8 | ESPN+ | Louisiana Tech | | Liberty Baseball Stadium | **L** 3–9 | Nichols (2–2) | **Blair** (6–4) | Allen (4) | 1,541 | 35–15 | 18–7 |
| May 9 | ESPN+ | Louisiana Tech | | Liberty Baseball Stadium | **L** 6–9 | Rowan (5–3) | **Lucas** (3–2) | Fisher (5) | 1,328 | 35–16 | 18–8 |
| May 10 | ESPN+ | Louisiana Tech | | Liberty Baseball Stadium | **W** 3–2 | **Zayac** (8–0) | Fontenot (0–3) | **Harrington** (10) | 1,044 | 36–16 | 19–8 |
| May 12 | | Wake Forest* | | Liberty Baseball Stadium | **L** 5–7 | Bosch (1–1) | **Dahlman** (0–2) | Bowie (2) | 1,505 | 36–17 | — |
| May 14 | ESPN+ | at Middle Tennessee | | Reese Smith Jr. Field; Murfreesboro, TN | **L** 1–8 | Horn Jr. (4–5) | **Blair** (6–5) | None | 927 | 36–18 | 19–9 |
| May 15 | ESPN+ | at Middle Tennessee | | Reese Smith Jr. Field | **W** 10–2 | **Swink** (3–2) | Alderman (2–4) | None | 904 | 37–18 | 20–9 |
| May 16 | ESPN+ | at Middle Tennessee | | Reese Smith Jr. Field | **W** 8–7 | **August** (6–0) | Beranek (1–3) | **Harrington** (11) | 949 | 38–18 | 21–9 |

Postseason (5–3)

C-USA tournament (3–1)
| Date | TV | Opponent | Seed | Stadium | Score | Win | Loss | Save | Attendance | Overall | C-USAT |
|---|---|---|---|---|---|---|---|---|---|---|---|
| May 21 | ESPN+ | vs. (8) Sam Houston | (2) | Mickey Dunn Stadium; Kennesaw, GA | **W** 10–4 | **Blair** (7–5) | Hickman (2–4) | **Harrington** (12) | | 39–18 | 1–0 |
| May 22 | ESPN+ | vs. (5) Louisiana Tech | (2) | Mickey Dunn Stadium | **W** 6–0 | **Potts** (3–2) | Rowan (6–4) | None | | 40–18 | 2–0 |
| May 23 | ESPN+ | vs. (3) Missouri State | (2) | Mickey Dunn Stadium | **W** 7–5 | **Zayac** (9–0) | Lucas (6–5) | **Harrington** (13) | 605 | 41–18 | 3–0 |
| May 24 | CBSSN | vs. (1) Jacksonville State | (2) | Mickey Dunn Stadium | **L** 0–10 ^{(7)} | Files (2–0) | **Swink** (3–3) | None | 552 | 41–19 | 3–1 |

Athens Regional (2–2)
| Date | TV | Opponent | Seed | Stadium | Score | Win | Loss | Save | Attendance | Overall | NCAAT |
|---|---|---|---|---|---|---|---|---|---|---|---|
| May 29 | ESPN+ | vs. (2) Boston College | (3) | Foley Field; Athens, GA | **W** 4–3 | **August** (7–0) | Soares (1–3) | **Harrington** (14) | 2,781 | 42–19 | 1–0 |
| May 30 | ESPN+ | at (1) No. 3 Georgia | (3) | Foley Field | **L** 2–6 | Scott (7–0) | **Zayac** (9–1) | Byrd (7) | 3,633 | 42–20 | 1–1 |
| May 31 | ESPN+ | vs. (2) Boston College | (3) | Foley Field | **W** 8–3 | **Potts** (4–2) | Miller (2–4) | None | 2,867 | 43–20 | 2–1 |
| May 31 | ESPN+ | at (1) No. 3 Georgia | (3) | Foley Field | **L** 1–6 | Aoki (9–1) | **Harrington** (2–2) | Brown (2) | 3,633 | 43–21 | 2–2 |

Legend: = Win = Loss = Canceled
**Bold** = Liberty team member
Rankings are based on the team's current ranking in the D1Baseball poll or NCAA tournament seeding for postseason play.

== Rankings ==
Ranking movements Legend: ██ Increase in ranking ██ Decrease in ranking — = Not ranked RV = Received votes
| | Week | | | | | | | | | | | | | | | | | |
| Poll | Pre | 1 | 2 | 3 | 4 | 5 | 6 | 7 | 8 | 9 | 10 | 11 | 12 | 13 | 14 | 15 | 16 | Final |
|---|---|---|---|---|---|---|---|---|---|---|---|---|---|---|---|---|---|---|
| Coaches' | — | —* | — | — | — | — | — | — | — | — | RV | — | RV | — | — | — | —* | |
| Baseball America | — | — | — | — | — | — | — | — | — | 25 | 25 | — | — | — | — | —* | —* | |
| NCBWA† | — | — | — | — | — | — | — | — | — | — | RV | RV | RV | RV | RV | RV* | RV | |
| D1Baseball | — | — | — | — | — | — | — | — | — | — | — | — | — | — | — | — | —* | |
| Perfect Game | — | — | — | — | — | — | — | — | — | — | — | 25 | 25 | — | — | —* | —* | |

† NCBWA ranks 30 teams in their preseason poll, but only ranks 25 teams weekly during the season.
* A new poll was not released for this week, so for comparison purposes, the previous week's ranking is inserted in this week's slot.
