= 2026 Clemson Tigers baseball team =

American college baseball season

2026 Clemson Tigers baseball
- Conference: Atlantic Coast Conference
- Record: 31–26 (10–20 ACC)
- Head coach: Erik Bakich (4th season)
- Assistant coaches: Nick Schnabel (4th season); Jimmy Belanger (4th season); Griffin Mazur (4th season)
- Home stadium: Doug Kingsmore Stadium

2026 Atlantic Coast Conference baseball standings
	Conf.						Overall
Team	W		L		T	PCT	W		L		T	PCT
No. 2 Georgia Tech ‍†‍‡‍^{y}	25	–	5	–	0	.833	45	–	9	–	0	.833
No. 4 North Carolina ‍‍‍^{y}	22	–	8	–	0	.733	43	–	10	–	1	.806
No. 12 Florida State ‍‍‍^{y}	19	–	11	–	0	.633	38	–	16	–	0	.704
Boston College ‍‍‍^{y}	17	–	13	–	0	.567	36	–	20	–	0	.643
Wake Forest ‍‍‍^{y}	16	–	14	–	0	.533	38	–	18	–	0	.679
Miami (FL) ‍‍‍^{y}	16	–	14	–	0	.533	36	–	17	–	0	.679
Virginia Tech ‍‍‍^{y}	15	–	15	–	0	.500	29	–	23	–	0	.558
Virginia ‍‍‍^{y}	14	–	16	–	0	.467	36	–	20	–	0	.643
NC State ‍‍‍^{y}	14	–	16	–	0	.467	32	–	21	–	0	.604
Louisville ‍‍‍	13	–	17	–	0	.433	30	–	26	–	0	.536
Notre Dame ‍‍‍	13	–	17	–	0	.433	30	–	21	–	0	.588
Stanford ‍‍‍	13	–	17	–	0	.433	28	–	25	–	0	.528
California ‍‍‍	12	–	18	–	0	.400	29	–	26	–	0	.527
Pittsburgh ‍‍‍	11	–	19	–	0	.367	30	–	23	–	0	.566
Clemson ‍‍‍	10	–	20	–	0	.333	31	–	25	–	0	.554
Duke ‍‍‍	10	–	20	–	0	.333	25	–	31	–	0	.446
† – Conference champion ‡ – Tournament champion y – Invited to the NCAA Tournament; As of May 17, 2026; Rankings from D1Baseball

The 2026 Clemson Tigers baseball team was the varsity intercollegiate baseball team that represented Clemson University during the 2026 NCAA Division I baseball season. The Tigers competed in the Atlantic Coast Conference (ACC) and were led by fourth-year head coach Erik Bakich. Clemson played its home games at Doug Kingsmore Stadium on campus in Clemson, South Carolina.

The Tigers began the season with a sweep of Army in a four game series. They followed that with a sweep of Charlotte and a defeat of Presbyterian to win their first nine straight games. They were ranked fifteenth in the D1Baseball Poll after the wins. The streak was broken at South Carolina in a rivalry loss. Clemson went on to win the next to games against South Carolina to take the series. Clemson continued their winning ways with a defeat of Michigan State and a sweep of La Salle to rise to eleventh in the rankings with a record of 15–1. They lost to Georgia Southern in a neutral site game before opening the ACC season with a 1–2 series loss against fourth-ranked Georgia Tech. After mid-week road defeats of College of Charleston and The Citadel, the Tigers were swept at Notre Dame. This loss saw them fall out of the rankings for the first time this season. They lost to fifteenth-ranked Coastal Carolina and had a 1–2 series loss to Miami (FL) to end March. Their fortunes didn't turn around much in April as they only won one ACC series in the month, at Stanford. They lost series to sixth-ranked North Carolina, at ninth-ranked Virginia, and at Louisville. A 3–1 record in mid-week games, saw the Tigers go 7–9 in the month. The team began May on a high note, winning their first ACC series in a month, defeating twentieth-ranked Boston College two games to one. They followed that with a defeat of eighth-ranked Coastal Carolina in Conway. The results proved to be a blip instead of a trend as the Tigers lost their next series against fourteenth-ranked Florida State, their final mid-week game against USC Upstate, and their final series of the season at Virginia Tech.

The Tigers finished the season 31–26 and 10–20 in ACC play to finish in a tie for fifteenth place. They were the fifteenth seed in the ACC tournament and were defeated in the first round by tenth-seed Notre Dame. Their fifteenth place finish was the lowest in program history. They were not invited to the NCAA tournament, breaking a streak of qualifying for three straight seasons. Their twenty-six losses were the most in during the tenure of head coach Erik Bakich.

== Previous season ==
The Tigers finished the ACC regular season 41–15 and 18–12 in ACC play to finish in fifth place, just one game back of first. They were the fifth seed in the ACC tournament and earned a bye into the Second Round in the new tournament format. There they defeated twelfth-seed Virginia Tech 6–1. In the Quarterfinals, they faced fourth-seed NC State who had swept the Tigers during the regular season. Clemson executed its revenge, winning 7–6. They defeated first-seed Georgia Tech in the Semifinals, and prevailed 9–4. They qualified for their second ACC final in three years, but fell to third-seed North Carolina 14–4. They received an at-large bid to the NCAA tournament and were selected as the eleventh-overall seed. They hosted a regional and were placed in the Baton Rouge Super Regional. The Tigers won their opening game against USC Upstate 7–3. They lost their next game against West Virginia 9–6. They faced Kentucky in an elimination game and lost 16–4 to end their season. The Tigers finished with a final record of 45–18. Their 45 total wins were the most since 2018.

== Personnel ==
=== Roster ===
2026 Clemson Tigers baseball team
Players
Coaches

#	Pos.	Name	B/T	Height	Weight	Year	Home town
00	RHP	Drew Titsworth	L/R	6 ft 3 in (1.91 m)	215 lb (98 kg)	Jr	Frankenmuth, Michigan
1	OF	Bryce Clavon	R/R	5 ft 10 in (1.78 m)	195 lb (88 kg)	So	Stockbridge, Georgia
2	OF	Briggs Sullivan	R/R	6 ft 2 in (1.88 m)	190 lb (86 kg)	RS Fr	Mount Pleasant, South Carolina
3	OF	Ty Dalley	L/R	6 ft 3 in (1.91 m)	210 lb (95 kg)	Sr	Vidalia, Georgia
4	INF	Tryston McCladdie	L/R	5 ft 11 in (1.8 m)	190 lb (86 kg)	Jr	Harlem, Georgia
5	OF	Jack Crighton	R/R	6 ft 3 in (1.91 m)	200 lb (91 kg)	Sr	Rochester Hills, Michigan
6	C	Ty Marshall	S/R	5 ft 9 in (1.75 m)	185 lb (84 kg)	Jr	Cayce, South Carolina
8	INF	Tyler Lichtenberger	L/R	6 ft 0 in (1.83 m)	195 lb (88 kg)	So	Boca Raton, Florida
9	C	Jacob Jarrell	R/R	6 ft 0 in (1.83 m)	220 lb (100 kg)	Sr	Florence, South Carolina
10	INF	Jason Fultz Jr.	R/R	6 ft 0 in (1.83 m)	215 lb (98 kg)	Fr	Harborcreek, Pennsylvania
12	RHP	Hayden Simmerson	R/R	6 ft 2 in (1.88 m)	205 lb (93 kg)	Jr	Salisbury, North Carolina
13	INF	Collin Priest	L/R	6 ft 3 in (1.91 m)	260 lb (118 kg)	Jr	Mount Dora, Florida
15	INF	Jackson Taylor	L/R	6 ft 4 in (1.93 m)	195 lb (88 kg)	Fr	Marietta, Georgia
16	INF	Luke Gaffney	R/R	6 ft 1 in (1.85 m)	235 lb (107 kg)	RS Jr	Danville, Kentucky
18	RHP	Ariston Veasey	R/R	6 ft 1 in (1.85 m)	185 lb (84 kg)	Jr	Peachtree City, Georgia
19	RHP	Aidan Knaak	R/R	6 ft 1 in (1.85 m)	215 lb (98 kg)	Jr	Fort Myers, Florida
20	RHP	Nathan Dvorsky	R/R	6 ft 1 in (1.85 m)	195 lb (88 kg)	Sr	Suwanee, Georgia
21	INF	Jay Dillard	R/R	5 ft 9 in (1.75 m)	175 lb (79 kg)	RS Jr	Anderson, South Carolina
23	INF	Jarren Purify	R/R	5 ft 10 in (1.78 m)	190 lb (86 kg)	Jr	Detroit, Michigan
24	RHP	Joe Allen	R/R	6 ft 3 in (1.91 m)	220 lb (100 kg)	Sr	Hampton Falls, New Hampshire
25	LHP	Nick Frusco	L/L	6 ft 4 in (1.93 m)	200 lb (91 kg)	Fr	Miller Place, New York
26	OF	Jackson Moore	L/R	5 ft 9 in (1.75 m)	185 lb (84 kg)	Fr	Hartsville, South Carolina
27	LHP	Dan Margolies	R/L	6 ft 1 in (1.85 m)	175 lb (79 kg)	Fr	Cheshire, Connecticut
29	LHP	Michael Sharman	R/L	6 ft 1 in (1.85 m)	180 lb (82 kg)	RS Sr	Woodstock, Georgia
30	RHP	Luke Kissenberth	R/R	6 ft 0 in (1.83 m)	180 lb (82 kg)	Gr	Greenville, South Carolina
31	LHP	Jacob McGovern	L/L	6 ft 1 in (1.85 m)	195 lb (88 kg)	Jr	Seneca, South Carolina
32	LHP	Brendon Bennett	L/L	6 ft 1 in (1.85 m)	220 lb (100 kg)	RS Fr	Novi, Michigan
33	LHP	Justin LeGuernic	R/L	6 ft 4 in (1.93 m)	210 lb (95 kg)	Jr	Dix Hills, New York
35	LHP	Noah Samol	L/L	6 ft 7 in (2.01 m)	245 lb (111 kg)	RS Jr	Mason, Ohio
36	RHP	Dane Moehler	R/R	6 ft 2 in (1.88 m)	210 lb (95 kg)	RS Fr	Marietta, Georgia
37	RHP	Danny Nelson	R/R	6 ft 1 in (1.85 m)	185 lb (84 kg)	Fr	Hershey, Pennsylvania
39	RHP	Peyton Miller	R/R	6 ft 4 in (1.93 m)	205 lb (93 kg)	Fr	Phoenix, Maryland
40	RHP	Landon Fowler	R/R	6 ft 3 in (1.91 m)	210 lb (95 kg)	Fr	Easley, South Carolina
43	LHP	Jake Morris	L/L	6 ft 6 in (1.98 m)	230 lb (104 kg)	Fr	Lugoff, South Carolina
44	RHP	Dylan Harrison	L/R	6 ft 5 in (1.96 m)	215 lb (98 kg)	Fr	Fontana, California
47	RHP	Eston Simpson	R/R	6 ft 5 in (1.96 m)	195 lb (88 kg)	Fr	Jefferson, Georgia
49	RHP	Chance Fitzgerald	R/R	6 ft 1 in (1.85 m)	215 lb (98 kg)	Jr	Sanford, Florida
93	RHP	Dion Brown	R/R	5 ft 10 in (1.78 m)	155 lb (70 kg)	So	York, South Carolina
96	LHP	Talan Bell	L/L	5 ft 10 in (1.78 m)	185 lb (84 kg)	So	Oviedo, Florida
99	C	Nate Savoie	R/R	6 ft 0 in (1.83 m)	215 lb (98 kg)	So	Fontana, California

Head coach

- Erik Bakich (East Carolina)

Assistant coach(es)

- Nick Schnabel (East Carolina)
- Jimmy Belanger (Louisville)
- Griffin Mazur (UC Irvine)

Legend

- (C) Team captain
- (S) Suspended
- (I) Ineligible
- Injured
- Current redshirt

Roster
Last update: February 24, 2026

== Schedule ==
Legend
	Clemson win
	Clemson loss
	Cancellation
**Bold**	Clemson team member
*	Non-Conference game
†	Make-Up Game

2026 Clemson Tigers baseball game log (31–26)
Regular season (31–25)

February (9–1)
Date	Opponent	Rank	Site/stadium	Score	Win	Loss	Save	Attendance	Overall record	ACC record
Feb 13	Army*	No. 19	Doug Kingsmore Stadium • Clemson, SC	**W** 3–2	**Allen** (1–0)	Vanderhave (0–1)	None	5,893	1–0	–
Feb 14 (DH 1)	Army*	No. 19	Doug Kingsmore Stadium • Clemson, SC	**W** 10–0 (8)	**Sharman** (1–0)	Penswick (0–1)	None	6,599	2–0	–
Feb 14 (DH 2)	Army*	No. 19	Doug Kingsmore Stadium • Clemson, SC	**W** 7–0	**LeGuernic** (1–0)	Reavey (0–1)	None	6,599	3–0	–
Feb 17	Charlotte*	No. 19	Doug Kingsmore Stadium • Clemson, SC	**W** 11–1 (7)	**Simpson** (1–0)	Kribbs (0–2)	None	4,923	4–0	–
Feb 20	Bryant*	No. 19	Doug Kingsmore Stadium • Clemson, SC	**W** 9–3	**Allen** (2–0)	Birchard (0–1)	None	5,235	5–0	–
Feb 21	Bryant*	No. 19	Doug Kingsmore Stadium • Clemson, SC	**W** 5–3	**Sharman** (2–0)	Scudder (0–1)	**Nelson** (1)	5,312	6–0	–
Feb 22	Bryant*	No. 19	Doug Kingsmore Stadium • Clemson, SC	**W** 7–5	**Titsworth** (1–0)	T. Davis (1–1)	**Allen** (1)	4,684	7–0	–
Feb 24	Presbyterian*	No. 15	Doug Kingsmore Stadium • Clemson, SC	**W** 6–2	**Simpson** (2–0)	Meredith (0–1)	None	4,389	8–0	–
Feb 27	at South Carolina*	No. 15	Founders Park • Columbia, SC (Rivalry)	**L** 0–7	Gunther (2–0)	**Knaak** (0–1)	None	8,242	8–1	–
Feb 28	vs South Carolina*	No. 15	Segra Park • Columbia, SC	**W** 4–1	**Sharman** (3–0)	Phillips (1–1)	None	8,480	9–1	–

March (10–9)
Date	Opponent	Rank	Site/stadium	Score	Win	Loss	Save	Attendance	Overall record	ACC record
Mar 1	South Carolina*	No. 15	Doug Kingsmore Stadium • Clemson, SC	**W** 7–2	**Titsworth** (2–0)	Goodman (0–2)	None	6,678	10–1	—
Mar 4	vs Michigan State*	No. 14	Fluor Field • Greenville, SC	**W** 12–1 (7)	**Simpson** (3–0)	Grundman (0–2)	None	3,204	11–1	—
Mar 6	La Salle*	No. 14	Doug Kingsmore Stadium • Clemson, SC	**W** 14–1	**Harrison** (1–0)	MacDonnell (2–1)	**LeGuernic** (1)	4,812	12–1	—
Mar 7 (DH 1)	La Salle*	No. 14	Doug Kingsmore Stadium • Clemson, SC	**W** 6–4	**Sharman** (4–0)	Terry (0–1)	**Nelson** (2)	5,690	13–1	—
Mar 7 (DH 2)	La Salle*	No. 14	Doug Kingsmore Stadium • Clemson, SC	**W** 16–4 (7)	**Titsworth** (3–0)	Rodriguez (0–1)	None	5,690	14–1	—
Mar 8	La Salle*	No. 14	Doug Kingsmore Stadium • Clemson, SC	**W** 16–3 (7)	**Brown** (1–0)	Brown (0–1)	None	4,188	15–1	—
Mar 10	vs Georgia Southern*	No. 11	SRP Park • North Augusta, SC	**L** 1–6	Mason (2–0)	**Simpson** (3–1)	None	5,921	15–2	—
Mar 12	No. 4 Georgia Tech	No. 11	Doug Kingsmore Stadium • Clemson, SC	**L** 0–10 (7)	McKee (3–0)	**Knaak** (0–2)	None	4,437	15–3	0–1
Mar 13	No. 4 Georgia Tech	No. 11	Doug Kingsmore Stadium • Clemson, SC	**L** 3–9	Patel (2–0)	**Sharman** (4–1)	None	4,522	15–4	0–2
Mar 14	No. 4 Georgia Tech	No. 11	Doug Kingsmore Stadium • Clemson, SC	**W** 13–7	**Brown** (2–0)	Blakely (1–1)	None	5,085	16–4	1–2
Mar 17	at College of Charleston*	No. 19	CofC Baseball Stadium at Patriots Point • Mount Pleasant, SC	**W** 3–1	**Samol** (1–0)	Bryant (1–2)	**Simmerson** (1)	1,680	17–4	—
Mar 18	at The Citadel*	No. 19	Joseph P. Riley, Jr. Park • Charleston, SC	**W** 9–3	**Simpson** (4–1)	Bowers (0–2)	None	5,298	18–4	—
Mar 20	at Notre Dame	No. 19	Frank Eck Stadium • Notre Dame, IN	**L** 0–6	Radel (3–1)	**Knaak** (0–3)	None	703	18–5	1–3
Mar 21	at Notre Dame	No. 19	Frank Eck Stadium • Notre Dame, IN	**L** 7–8	Thurmond (1–1)	**Nelson** (0–1)	None	1,270	18–6	1–4
Mar 22	at Notre Dame	No. 19	Frank Eck Stadium • Notre Dame, IN	**L** 4–7	Uber (4–0)	**Titsworth** (3–1)	None	743	18–7	1–5
Mar 24	No. 15 Coastal Carolina*		Doug Kingsmore Stadium • Clemson, SC	**L** 9–11	Horn (3–0)	**Nelson** (0–2)	None	4,934	18–8	—
Mar 26	Miami (FL)		Doug Kingsmore Stadium • Clemson, SC	**L** 3–8 (10)	Bilka (2–0)	**Brown** (2–1)	None	4,689	18–9	1–6
Mar 27	Miami (FL)		Doug Kingsmore Stadium • Clemson, SC	**W** 7–6	**Nelson** (1–2)	Coats (4–1)	**LeGuernic** (2)	4,853	19–9	2–6
Mar 28	Miami (FL)		Doug Kingsmore Stadium • Clemson, SC	**L** 6–8	Colleara (2–1)	**Titsworth** (3–2)	None	5,728	19–10	2–7

April (7–9)
Date	Opponent	Rank	Site/stadium	Score	Win	Loss	Save	Attendance	Overall record	ACC record
Apr 1	vs Wake Forest*		Truist Field • Charlotte, NC	**L** 4–15 (7)	Harsch (1–0)	**Harrison** (1–1)	None	3,934	19–11	—
Apr 3	at Stanford		Klein Field at Sunken Diamond • Stanford, CA	**W** 9–3	**Knaak** (1–3)	Dugan (1–3)	**Simmerson** (2)	1,522	20–11	3–7
Apr 4	at Stanford		Klein Field at Sunken Diamond • Stanford, CA	**L** 4–5	Gomez (3–0)	**LeGuernic** (1–1)	Moore (2)	2,025	20–12	3–8
Apr 5	at Stanford		Klein Field at Sunken Diamond • Stanford, CA	**W** 12–5	**Harrison** (2–1)	Erspamer (0–2)	None	1,383	21–12	4–8
Apr 6	at Santa Clara*		Stephen Schott Stadium • Santa Clara, CA	**W** 6–4	**Allen** (3–0)	Meyn (1–3)	**LeGuernic** (3)	513	22–12	—
Apr 10	No. 6 North Carolina		Doug Kingsmore Stadium • Clemson, SC	**W** 9–5	**Knaak** (2–3)	DeCaro (5–2)	**Simmerson** (3)	5,345	23–12	5–8
Apr 11	No. 6 North Carolina		Doug Kingsmore Stadium • Clemson, SC	**L** 4–6 (14)	Glauber (4–0)	**Harrison** (2–2)	None	5,188	23–13	5–9
Apr 12	No. 6 North Carolina		Doug Kingsmore Stadium • Clemson, SC	**L** 5–12	Boaz (3–0)	**Titsworth** (3–3)	None	4,467	23–14	5–10
Apr 14	at Charlotte*		Truist Field • Charlotte, NC	**W** 7–3	**LeGuernic** (2–1)	Perez (0–1)	None	1,774	24–14	—
Apr 16	at No. 9 Virginia		Davenport Field at Disharoon Park • Charlottesville, VA	**L** 4–6	Zatkowski (6–0)	**Knaak** (2–4)	Kapa (8)	3,671	24–15	5–11
Apr 17	at No. 9 Virginia		Davenport Field at Disharoon Park • Charlottesville, VA	**W** 5–1	**Sharman** (5–1)	Jaxel (4–1)	None	4,216	25–15	6–11
Apr 18	at No. 9 Virginia		Davenport Field at Disharoon Park • Charlottesville, VA	**L** 4–5	Hartman (8–0)	**Nelson** (1–3)	Kapa (9)	5,077	25–16	6–12
Apr 21	USC Upstate*		Doug Kingsmore Stadium • Clemson, SC	**W** 7–2	**LeGuernic** (3–1)	Hemmerling (0–3)	None	4,589	26–16	—
Apr 24	at Louisville		Jim Patterson Stadium • Louisville, KY	**L** 10–13	Danilowicz (4–2)	**Knaak** (2–5)	None	3,084	26–17	6–13
Apr 25	at Louisville		Jim Patterson Stadium • Louisville, KY	**L** 6–11	Brown (4–2)	**Simmerson** (0–1)	None	3,214	26–18	6–14
Apr 26	at Louisville		Jim Patterson Stadium • Louisville, KY	**L** 5–7	Hoyt (1–0)	**LeGuernic** (3–2)	None	2,940	26–19	6–15

May (5–6)
Date	Opponent	Rank	Site/stadium	Score	Win	Loss	Save	Attendance	Overall record	ACC record
May 1	No. 20 Boston College		Doug Kingsmore Stadium • Clemson, SC	**L** 4–8	Colarusso (5–2)	**Moehler** (0–1)	Gonzalez (3)	4,743	26–20	6–16
May 2	No. 20 Boston College		Doug Kingsmore Stadium • Clemson, SC	**W** 14–4 (7)	**Sharman** (6–1)	Miller (2–1)	None	4,527	27–20	7–16
May 3	No. 20 Boston College		Doug Kingsmore Stadium • Clemson, SC	**W** 4–3	**Simmerson** (1–1)	Soares (1–2)	None	4,334	28–20	8–16
May 5	at No. 8 Coastal Carolina*		Springs Brooks Stadium • Conway, SC	**W** 8–4	**Titsworth** (4–3)	Smallets (0–2)	None	6,103	29–20	—
May 8	No. 14 Florida State		Doug Kingsmore Stadium • Clemson, SC	**L** 4–8	Mendes (9–3)	**Moehler** (0–2)	Manca (1)	5,051	29–21	8–17
May 9	No. 14 Florida State		Doug Kingsmore Stadium • Clemson, SC	**W** 4–3	**Nelson** (2–3)	Mebil (1–2)	**Simmerson** (4)	5,036	30–21	9–17
May 10	No. 14 Florida State		Doug Kingsmore Stadium • Clemson, SC	**L** 3–6	Moore (6–1)	**Knaak** (2–6)	Purcell (3)	4,877	30–22	9–18
May 12	at USC Upstate*		Fifth Third Park • Spartanburg, SC	**L** 3–6	Bianchini (2–2)	**Harrison** (2–3)	None	3,456	30–23	—
May 14	at Virginia Tech		English Field • Blacksburg, VA	**L** 1–5	Renfrow (5–4)	**Moehler** (0–3)	None	476	30–24	9–19
May 15	at Virginia Tech		English Field • Blacksburg, VA	**L** 1–2	Grim (4–4)	**Simmerson** (1–2)	None	738	30–25	9–20
May 16	at Virginia Tech		English Field • Blacksburg, VA	**W** 10–8	**LeGuernic** (4–2)	Stieg (2–4)	**Miller** (1)	1,022	31–25	10–20

Postseason (0–1)

ACC Tournament (0–1)
Date	Time	Opponent	Seed/Rank	Site/stadium	Score	Win	Loss	Save	Attendance	Overall record	Tournament record
May 19	5:00 p.m.	vs. (10) Notre Dame	(15)	Truist Field • Charlotte, NC	**L** 4–5	Radel (8–3)	**Sharman** (6–2)	Rooney (6)	3,721	31–26	0–1

Note: All rankings shown are from D1Baseball Poll.

== Roster moves ==
=== 2025 MLB draft ===
The Tigers had two players drafted in the 2025 MLB draft.

Player	Position	Round	Overall	MLB Team
Cam Cannarella	Outfield	2	43	Miami Marlins
Lucas Mahlstedt	Right Handed Pitcher	7	199	Los Angeles Angels

==== Other departures ====
Other Departures
Name	B/T	Number	Pos.	Height	Weight	Year	Hometown	Reason for departure
Lleyton Lackey	S/L	1	OF	5'6"	160	Junior	Evans, Georgia	Transferred to Lenoir–Rhyne
Hideki Prather	R/R	2	C	5'10"	195	Freshman	Oakland, California	Transferred to California
Andrew Ciufo	R/R	5	INF	6'0"	200	Graduate Student	Medford, New York	Graduated
Dominic Listi	L/L	6	OF	5'11"	205	Graduate Student	Crystal Lake, Illinois	Graduated
Josh Paino	R/R	8	INF	5'11"	200	Graduate Student	Temecula, California	Graduated
Steele Burd	R/R	11	C	6'0"	210	Freshman	Hilton Head Island, South Carolina	Transferred to State College of Florida, Manatee–Sarasota
Hudson Lee	R/L	12	LHP	6'4"	230	(redshirt) Sophomore	Roebuck, South Carolina	Transferred to South Carolina
B.J. Bailey	L/L	13	LHP	6'3"	180	(redshirt) Senior	Woodruff, South Carolina	Graduated
Reed Garris	R/R	15	RHP	6'0"	215	Senior	Mount Pleasant, South Carolina	Graduated
Josh Castellani	L/R	17	INF	6'4"	210	Freshman	St. Petersburg, Florida	Transferred to State College of Florida, Manatee–Sarasota
T.P. Wentworth	L/L	18	OF	6'3"	230	Freshman	Ripon, California	Transferred to Oklahoma State
Anthony Wilkie	R/R	22	RHP	6'5"	225	Freshman	Gainesville, Florida	Transferred to Florida SouthWestern
Luke Brown	R/R	25	RHP	6'7"	205	Sophomore	Apex, North Carolina	Entered transfer portal
Casey Tallent	R/R	26	RHP	6'0"	225	(redshirt) Junior	Hartwell, Georgia	Graduated
Tristan Bissetta	L/L	27	OF	6'1"	225	(redshirt) Junior	Greenville, South Carolina	Transferred to Ole Miss
Jackson Cole	L/L	37	LHP	6'2"	190	Freshman	Boiling Springs, South Carolina	Transferred to The Citadel
Ethan Darden	L/L	39	LHP	6'0"	175	Junior	Rock Hill, South Carolina	Transferred to Texas A&M
Brodey Conn	L/R	40	INF	6'1"	205	(redshirt) Sophomore	Clemson, South Carolina	—
Cannon Feazell	R/R	41	RHP	6'1"	195	Freshman	Windermere, Florida	—
Michael Gillen	R/R	42	RHP	6'2"	220	Junior	Rochelle Park, New Jersey	Transferred to UCF
Chayce Kieck	R/R	45	RHP	6'1"	185	Freshman	Jacksonville, Florida	Transferred to Northwestern
Austin Jacobs	R/R	48	INF	6'0"	175	Freshman	Geneva, Florida	Transferred to UCF
Owen Anchors	L/L	55	OF	6'2"	190	Freshman	Dunwoody, Georgia	—

=== Incoming transfers ===
Incoming transfers
Name	B/T	Number	Pos.	Height	Weight	Year	Hometown	Previous school
Bryce Clavon	R/R	1	OF	5'10"	195	Sophomore	Stockbridge, Georgia	Georgia
Ty Dalley	L/R	3	OF	6'3"	210	Senior	Vidalia, Georgia	Mercer
Tyler Lichtenberger	L/R	8	INF	6'0"	195	Sophomore	Boca Raton, Florida	Appalachian State
Hayden Simmerson	R/R	12	RHP	6'2"	205	Junior	Salisbury, North Carolina	Catawaba
Ariston Veasey	R/R	18	RHP	6'1"	185	Junior	Peachtree City, Georgia	Alabama
Michael Sharman	R/L	29	LHP	6'1"	180	(redshirt) Senior	Woodstock, Georgia	Tennessee
Nate Savoie	R/R	99	C/OF	6'0"	215	Sophomore	Fontana, California	Loyola Marymount

=== Incoming recruits ===
Incoming Recruits
Name	B/T	Number	Pos.	Height	Weight	Hometown	High School
Jason Fultz Jr.	R/R	10	INF	6'0"	215	Harborcreek, Pennsylvania	P27 Academy
Jackson Taylor	L/R	15	INF	6'4"	195	Marietta, Georgia	Walton
Nick Frusco	L/L	25	LHP	6'4"	200	Miller Place, New York	Miller Place
Jackson Moore	L/R	26	OF	5'9"	185	Hartsville, South Carolina	Hartsville
Dan Margolies	R/L	27	LHP	6'1"	175	Cheshire, Connecticut	Cheshire Academy
Danny Nelson	R/R	37	RHP	6'1"	185	Hershey, Pennsylvania	Hershey
Peyton Miller	R/R	39	RHP	6'4"	205	Phoenix, Maryland	IMG Academy
Landon Fowler	R/R	40	RHP	6'3"	210	Easley, South Carolina	Powdersville
Jake Morris	L/L	43	LHP	6'6"	230	Lugoff, South Carolina	Lugoff-Elgin
Dylan Harrison	L/R	44	RHP	6'5"	215	Fontana, California	Summit
Eston Simpson	R/R	47	RHP	6'5"	195	Jefferson, Georgia	Jefferson County

== Rankings ==
Ranking movements Legend: ██ Increase in ranking ██ Decrease in ranking — = Not ranked RV = Received votes
	Week																
Poll	Pre	1	2	3	4	5	6	7	8	9	10	11	12	13	14	15	Final
Coaches'	17	17*	11	12	9	17	RV	—	—	—	—	—	—	—	—	—	—
Baseball America	20	18	14	15	12	14	24	—	—	—	—	—	—	—	—	—	—
NCBWA†	17	15	12	10	8	15	24	RV	RV	RV	—	—	—	—	—	—	—
D1Baseball	19	19	15	14	11	19	—	—	—	—	—	—	—	—	—	—	—
Perfect Game	20	19	19	19	11	19	—	—	—	—	—	—	—	—	—	—	—

† NCBWA ranks 30 teams in their preseason poll, but only ranks 25 teams weekly during the season.
* A new poll was not released for this week, so for comparison purposes, the previous week's ranking is inserted in this week's slot.
