= Eric Becker (baseball) =

American baseball player (born 2005)

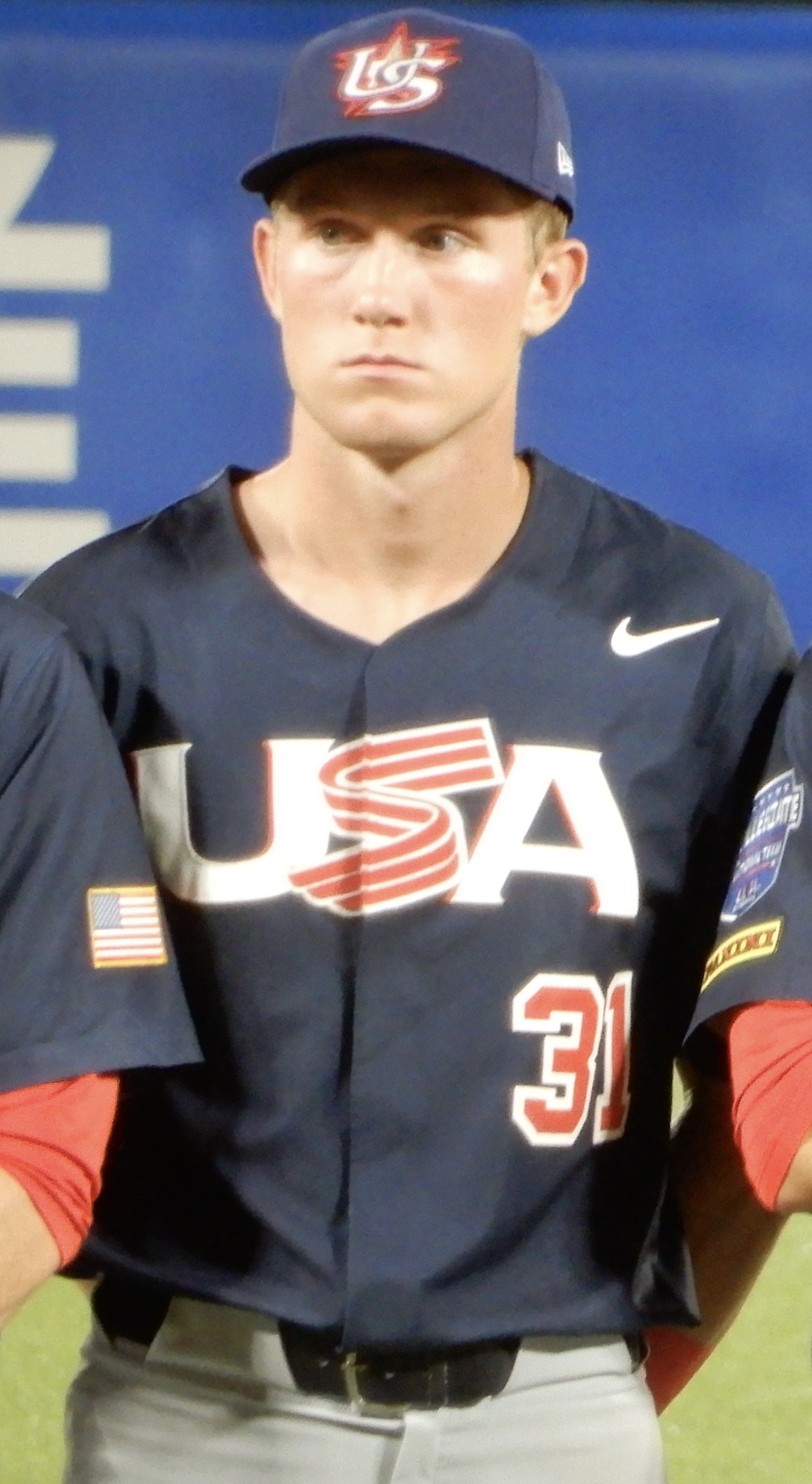
- Becker in 2025

Cincinnati Reds
- Shortstop
- Born: April 28, 2005 (age 21); Suffern, New York, U.S.
- Bats: Left Throws: Right
- Stats at Baseball Reference

Eric Thomas Becker (born April 28, 2005) is an American professional baseball shortstop in the Cincinnati Reds organization.

== Career ==
Becker attended Don Bosco Preparatory High School in Ramsey, New Jersey. He committed to the University of Virginia to play college baseball.

Prior to his freshman year at Virginia in 2023, Becker played collegiate summer baseball for the Vermont Lake Monsters. As a freshman in 2024, he started 39 of 45 games he played at second and third base, hitting .362/.468/.669 with eight home runs and 46 runs batted in (RBI). After the season, he played summer ball for the Kalamazoo Growlers in the Northwoods League.

As a sophomore in 2025, Becker started 50 games at shortstop and hit .368/.453/.617 with nine home runs and 52 home runs. After the season, he entered the transfer portal but withdrew and returned to Virginia for his junior season in 2026. During the summer he played for the Harwich Mariners in the Cape Cod Baseball League. Becker entered the 2026 season as the Cavaliers starting shortstop.

Becker is a top prospect for the 2026 Major League Baseball draft.

== Personal life ==
Eric's brother, Nick, is a shortstop in the Seattle Mariners organization.
