= 2026 NCAA Division I baseball rankings =

2026 NCAA Division I baseball season
- Duration: February 13, 2026 – June 22, 2026
- Number of teams: 300

Tournament
- Duration: May 29–June 22, 2026

College World Series
- Champions: Oklahoma (3rd title)
- Runners-up: North Carolina (13th CWS Appearance)
- Winning coach: Skip Johnson (1st title)
- MOP: Jaxon Willits (Oklahoma)

Seasons
- ← 2025 2027 →

The following human polls make up the 2026 NCAA Division I men's baseball rankings. The USA Today Coaches Poll is voted on by a panel of 31 Division I baseball coaches. The Baseball America poll is voted on by staff members of the Baseball America magazine. These polls, along with the D1Baseball poll and the Perfect Game poll rank the top 25 teams nationally. The National Collegiate Baseball Writers Association rank the top 30 teams nationally.

== Legend ==
	Increase in ranking
	Decrease in ranking
	Not ranked previous week
Italics	Number of first place votes
(#-#)	Win-loss record
т	Tied with team above or below also with this symbol

== USA Today Coaches Poll ==
	Preseason Feb 3	Week 2 Feb 23	Week 3 Mar 2	Week 4 Mar 9	Week 5 Mar 16	Week 6 Mar 23	Week 7 Mar 30	Week 8 Apr 6	Week 9 Apr 13	Week 10 Apr 20	Week 11 Apr 27	Week 12 May 4	Week 13 May 11	Week 14 May 18	Week 15 May 25	Final June 23	
1.	LSU (15)	LSU (8–0) (14)	UCLA (9–2) (21)	UCLA (13–2) (22)	UCLA (17–2) (26)	UCLA (21–2) (29)	UCLA (25–2) (30)	UCLA (29–2) (30)	UCLA (33–2) (30)	UCLA (36–3) (30)	UCLA (39–4) (29)	UCLA (43–4) (30)	UCLA (46–5) (30)	UCLA (48–6) (28)	UCLA (51–6) (26)	Oklahoma (43–23)	1.
2.	UCLA (14)	UCLA (6–1) (15)	LSU (11–1) (4)	Texas (15–0) (7)	Texas (18–1) (4)	Texas (20–3)	Texas (23–4)	Texas (26–5)	Georgia Tech (30–5)	North Carolina (33–7–1)	North Carolina (36–7–1)	North Carolina (37–9–1)	North Carolina (40–9–1)	North Carolina (43–10–1)	Georgia Tech (48–9) (4)	North Carolina (54–14–1)	2.
3.	Texas	Texas (7–0)	Texas (11–0) (5)	Mississippi State (13–2)	Georgia Tech (17–3)	Georgia Tech (19–5)	Georgia Tech (22–5)	Georgia Tech (26–5)	North Carolina (30–6–1)	Georgia Tech (32–7)	Georgia Tech (36–7) (1)	Georgia Tech (39–8)	Georgia Tech (42–8)	Georgia Tech (45–9) (1)	Georgia (46–12)	Georgia (53–14)	3.
4.	Georgia Tech	Georgia Tech (8–0)	Mississippi State (11–1)	Georgia Tech (14–2)	Auburn (17–2)	Mississippi State (20–4)	Mississippi State (24–4)	Georgia (27–6)	Texas (27–7)	Texas (30–8)	Texas (32–9)	Texas (35–10)	Georgia (41–11)	Georgia (43–12) (1)	North Carolina (45–11–1)	West Virginia (47–17)	4.
5.	Arkansas	Mississippi State (8–0) (1)	Georgia Tech (11–1)	Auburn (13–2)	Georgia (17–4)	Auburn (19–4)	Georgia (23–6)	North Carolina (27–5–1)	Georgia (29–8)	Georgia (32–9)	Georgia (34–11)	Georgia (38–11)	Texas (37–12)	Texas (40–12)	Texas (40–13)	Texas (46–15)	5.
6.	Mississippi State (1)	Arkansas (6–1)	North Carolina (11–1)	Arkansas (12–4)	Mississippi State (16–4)	Arkansas (18–7)	North Carolina (24–4–1)	Florida State (24–7)	Oregon State (28–7)	Oregon State (30–8)	Oregon State (33–9)	Auburn (32–14)	Auburn (35–15)	Auburn (36–18)	Auburn (38–19)	Alabama (42–21)	6.
7.	Coastal Carolina	Auburn (6–1)	Auburn (9–2)	Southern Miss (14–2)	Arkansas (14–6)	Georgia (20–5)	Florida State (21–6)	Oregon State (24–6)	Texas A&M (27–7)	Texas A&M (31–7)	Texas A&M (33–8)	Texas A&M (35–10)	Oregon State (40–11)	Oregon State (43–12)	Southern Miss (44–15)	Ole Miss (41–23)	7.
8.	North Carolina	North Carolina (6–1)	Florida (11–1)	Georgia (15–3)	Oklahoma (17–3)	Florida State (19–4)	USC (26–3)	Mississippi State (25–7)	Coastal Carolina (26–9)	Florida State (28–11)	Auburn (30–13)	Oregon State (36–11)	Florida State (36–15)	Florida State (38–16)	Oregon State (43–12)	Troy (39–32)	8.
9.	Auburn	Georgia (6–1)	Arkansas (9–3)	Clemson (15–1)	Florida State (16–3)	Oklahoma (19–5)	Oregon State (21–5)	Alabama (25–8)	USC (30–7)	Auburn (27–12)	Mississippi State (34–10)	Kansas (37–11)	Southern Miss (37–14)	Texas A&M (39–13)	Florida State (38–17)	Auburn (42–22)	9.
10.	TCU	Florida (7–1)	Georgia (10–2)	NC State (14–2)	North Carolina (17–3–1)	USC (24–1) (1)	Oregon (23–5)	USC (27–6)	Florida State (24–11)	Coastal Carolina (28–11)	Coastal Carolina (30–13)	Coastal Carolina (33–14)	Texas A&M (37–12)	Southern Miss (40–14)	Texas A&M (39–14)	UCLA (52–8)	10.
11.	Louisville	Clemson (7–0)	Southern Miss (10–1)	Oklahoma (14–2)	USC (19–1)	Virginia (20–5)	Auburn (20–7)	Coastal Carolina (23–8)	Auburn (24–11)	Mississippi State (30–10)	Kansas (33–11)	Mississippi State (36–12)	West Virginia (35–12)	West Virginia (37–13)	West Virginia (39–14)	Georgia Tech (50–11)	11.
12.	Oregon State	Southern Miss (6–1)	Clemson (10–1)	Wake Forest (15–1)	Virginia (16–4)	North Carolina (20–4–1)	West Virginia (19–5)	Auburn (22–9)	Virginia (26–11)	Virginia (28–13)	Florida State (29–14)	Florida State (33–14)	Mississippi State (38–14)	Oregon (38–15)	Oregon (40–16)	Kansas (45–18)	12.
13.	Georgia	Coastal Carolina (5–2)	NC State (10–1)	LSU (12–5)	NC State (16–4)	Southern Miss (19–5)	Southern Miss (21–7)	Southern Miss (23–9)	Alabama (26–11)	Oklahoma (27–12)	Southern Miss (31–13)	Southern Miss (34–14)	USC (41–12)	Arkansas (36–19)	Arkansas (39–20)	Mississippi State (43–19)	13.
14.	Florida State	Oklahoma (7–0)	Oklahoma (10–2)	North Carolina (13–3–1)	Florida (18–3)	Oregon State (17–5)	Virginia (22–7)	Virginia (24–9)	Oklahoma (24–11)	West Virginia (27–9)	Oregon (32–11)	Oregon (35–12)	Arkansas (34–18)	Mississippi State (39–16)	Florida (39–19)	Oregon (43–18)	14.
15.	Tennessee	NC State (5–1)	Florida State (8–2)	Florida State (13–2)	Southern Miss (16–4)	NC State (18–6)	Oklahoma (19–8)	Texas A&M (25–6)	West Virginia (24–11)	Alabama (28–13)	Oklahoma (29–14)	West Virginia (31–12)	Oregon (36–14)	Alabama (37–18)	Kansas (42–16)	USC (48–18)	15.
16.	Florida	Miami (FL) (9–0)	Wake Forest (11–1)	Virginia (13–3)	Oregon State (14–4)	West Virginia (16–4)	Arkansas (19–10)т	UCF (20–9)	Mississippi State (26–10)	Nebraska (31–9)т	Nebraska (33–11)	USC (37–12)	Alabama (35–17)	Kansas (39–16)	Alabama (37–19)	Texas A&M (41–16)	16.
17.	Clemson	Florida State (4–2)	Coastal Carolina (7–4)	Oregon State (10–4)	Clemson (16–4)	Oregon (19–4)	Alabama (22–7)т	Nebraska (26–6)	Arkansas (24–13)	Kansas (29–11)т	USC (34–11)	Arizona State (33–15)	Kansas (37–15)	Florida (37–18)	Mississippi State (40–17)	Southern Miss (44–17)	17.
18.	Vanderbilt	Oregon State (4–3)	Oregon State (6–4)	Florida (14–3)	Kentucky (18–2)	Kentucky (19–4)т	Coastal Carolina (20–7)	Oklahoma (21–10)	Florida (27–10)	Ole Miss (29–12)	Ole Miss (31–14)	Arkansas (32–17)	Coastal Carolina (34–17)	Nebraska (41–14)	Nebraska (42–15)	Florida State (40–19)	18.
19.	NC State	Tennessee (5–2)	Tennessee (8–3)	USC (15–0) (1)	Oregon (17–3)	Ole Miss (19–6)т	Florida (23–6)	West Virginia (21–7)	Oregon (26–10)	Southern Miss (28–12)	Boston College (33–14)	Alabama (32–16)	Ole Miss (34–18)	USC (42–14)	USC (43–15)	Florida (41–21)	19.
20.	Southern Miss	Wake Forest (6–1)	Texas A&M (10–1)	Texas A&M (14–1)	Coastal Carolina (13–6)	Coastal Carolina (16–7)	Texas A&M (22–5)	Oregon (24–8)	Southern Miss (25–11)	Boston College (31–12)	West Virginia (28–12)	Florida (31–17)	Florida (34–18)	Ole Miss (36–20)	Ole Miss (36–21)	Oregon State (45–14)	20.
21.	Miami (FL)	Ole Miss (8–0)	TCU (6–5)т	Tennessee (12–4)	Texas A&M (16–3)	Tennessee (17–7)	Nebraska (22–6)	Arizona State (23–9)	Kansas (26–10)	Oregon (28–11)	Arizona State (31–14)	Oklahoma (30–16)	Nebraska (37–14)	Oklahoma State (36–19)	Oklahoma State (37–20)	Arkansas (41–22)	21.
22.	Virginia	Vanderbilt (6–2)т	Miami (FL) (10–2)т	Kentucky (14–2)	West Virginia (13–4)	Arizona State (17–6)	Kentucky (21–6)	Arkansas (20–13)	Arizona State (26–11)	Florida (28–13)	Arkansas (29–16)	Boston College (35–16)	Arizona State (34–17)	Arizona State (36–18)	Arizona State (37–19)	Nebraska (43–17)	22.
23.	Oregon	Texas A&M (7–0)т	Oregon (10–1)	TCU (9–6)	Tennessee (14–6)	Alabama (18–7)	NC State (18–10)	NC State (21–11)	Ole Miss (26–11)	USC (30–11)	Alabama (29–16)	Ole Miss (32–17)	Oklahoma State (33–18)	Cincinnati (37–19)	Jacksonville State (46–13)	Cal Poly (39–24)	23.
24.	Arizona	Oregon (8–0)	Kentucky (9–2)	Ole Miss (15–2)	Ole Miss (16–5)	Texas A&M (18–5)	Arizona State (20–8)	Florida (24–9)	Boston College (26–12)	Arkansas (26–15)	Virginia (29–16)	Nebraska (34–14)	Boston College (36–17)	Coastal Carolina (36–19)	Cincinnati (37–20)	St. John's (36–26)	24.
25.	Wake Forest	TCU (2–5)	USC (11–0)	Coastal Carolina (9–6)	Wake Forest (15–5)	Florida (19–6)	Boston College (20–9)	Boston College (22–11)	Nebraska (27–9)	Arizona State (28–13)	Florida (29–16)	Virginia (32–16)	Jacksonville State (40–11)	Tennessee (37–19)	Tennessee (38–20)	Little Rock (39–28)	25.
	Preseason Feb 3	Week 2 Feb 23	Week 3 Mar 2	Week 4 Mar 9	Week 5 Mar 16	Week 6 Mar 23	Week 7 Mar 30	Week 8 Apr 6	Week 9 Apr 13	Week 10 Apr 20	Week 11 Apr 27	Week 12 May 4	Week 13 May 11	Week 14 May 18	Week 15 May 25	Final June 23	
		Dropped: No. 11 Louisville; No. 22 Virginia; No. 24 Arizona	Dropped: No. 21 Ole Miss; No. 22 Vanderbilt	Dropped: No. 21 Miami (FL); No. 23 Oregon	Dropped: No. 13 LSU; No. 23 TCU	Dropped: No. 17 Clemson; No. 25 Wake Forest	Dropped: No. 18 Ole Miss; No. 21 Tennessee	Dropped: No. 22 Kentucky	Dropped: No. 16 UCF; No. 23 NC State	None	None	None	Dropped: No. 21 Oklahoma; No. 25 Virginia	Dropped: No. 24 Boston College; No. 25 Jacksonville State	Dropped: No. 24 Coastal Carolina	Dropped: No. 21 Oklahoma State; No. 22 Arizona State; No. 23 Jacksonville State; No. 24 Cincinnati; No. 25 Tennessee	

== Baseball America ==
	Preseason Jan 19	Week 1 Feb 16	Week 2 Feb 23	Week 3 Mar 2	Week 4 Mar 9	Week 5 Mar 16	Week 6 Mar 23	Week 7 Mar 30	Week 8 Apr 6	Week 9 Apr 13	Week 10 Apr 20	Week 11 Apr 27	Week 12 May 4	Week 13 May 11	Week 14 May 18	Final June 23	
1.	UCLA	UCLA (2–1)	UCLA (6–1)	UCLA (9–2)	UCLA (13–2)	UCLA (17–2)	UCLA (21–2)	UCLA (25–2)	UCLA (29–2)	UCLA (33–2)	UCLA (36–3)	UCLA (39–4)	UCLA (43–4)	UCLA (46–5)	UCLA (48–6)	Oklahoma (43–23)	1.
2.	LSU	LSU (3–0)	LSU (8–0)	LSU (11–1)	Mississippi State (14–2)	Texas (18–1)	Texas (20–3)	Texas (23–4)	Texas (26–5)	Georgia Tech (30–5)	North Carolina (33–7–1)	North Carolina (36–8–1)	North Carolina (37–9–1)	North Carolina (40–9–1)	Georgia Tech (45–9)	North Carolina (54–14–1)	2.
3.	Mississippi State	Mississippi State (3–0)	Mississippi State (8–0)	Mississippi State (11–1)	Texas (15–0)	Georgia Tech (17–3)	Georgia Tech (19–5)	Georgia Tech (22–5)	Georgia Tech (26–5)	North Carolina (30–6–1)	Texas (30–8)	Texas (32–9)	Texas (35–10)	Georgia Tech (42–8)	North Carolina (43–10–1)	Georgia (53–14)	3.
4.	Georgia Tech	Georgia Tech (3–0)	Georgia Tech (8–0)	Georgia Tech (11–1)	Georgia Tech (14–2)	Auburn (17–2)	Georgia (20–5)	Georgia (23–6)	Georgia (27–6)	Texas (27–7)	Georgia Tech (32–7)	Georgia Tech (36–7)	Georgia Tech (39–8)	Auburn (35–15)	Georgia (43–12)	West Virginia (47–17)	4.
5.	Auburn	Auburn (3–0)	Auburn (6–1)	Texas (11–0)	Auburn (13–2)	Arkansas (14–6)	Arkansas (18–7)	Mississippi State (24–4)	Florida State (24–7)	Oregon State (28–7)	Oregon State (30–8)	Oregon State (33–9)	Auburn (32–14)	Georgia (41–11)	Texas (40–12)	Texas (46–15)	5.
6.	Georgia	North Carolina (3–0)	Texas (7–0)	Auburn (9–2)	Georgia (15–3)	Georgia (17–4)	Auburn (19–4)	Florida State (21–6)	North Carolina (27–5–1)	Auburn (24–11)	Auburn (27–12)	Auburn (30–13)	Georgia (38–11)	Texas (37–12)	Auburn (36–18)	Alabama (42–21)	6.
7.	North Carolina	Texas (3–0)	North Carolina (6–1–1)	North Carolina (11–1–1)	Oklahoma (14–2)	Oklahoma (17–3)	Oklahoma (19–5)	North Carolina (24–4–1)	Oregon State (24–6)	Florida (27–10)	Georgia (32–9)	Georgia (34–11)	Oregon State (36–11)	Oregon State (39–11)	Oregon State (43–12)	Ole Miss (41–23)	7.
8.	Texas	TCU (2–1)	Georgia (6–1)	Georgia (10–2)	Arkansas (12–4)	Mississippi State (16–4)	Mississippi State (20–4)	Oregon State (21–5)	Alabama (26–8)	Georgia (29–8)	Texas A&M (31–7)	Texas A&M (33–8)	Coastal Carolina (33–14)	Southern Miss (37–14)	Southern Miss (40–14)	Troy (39–32)	8.
9.	TCU	Georgia (2–1)	Arkansas (6–1)	Arkansas (9–3)	Virginia (13–3)	Virginia (16–4)	Virginia (20–5)	USC (26–3)	Mississippi State (25–7)	Texas A&M (27–7)	Oklahoma (27–12)	Coastal Carolina (30–13)	Kansas (37–11)	Florida (34–18)	Florida (37–18)	Auburn (42–22)	9.
10.	Arkansas	Arkansas (2–1)	Oklahoma (7–0)	Oklahoma (10–2)	Southern Miss (14–2)	Florida State (16–3)	Florida State (19–4)	Alabama (22–7)	Auburn (22–9)	USC (30–7)	Coastal Carolina (28–11)	Mississippi State (34–10)	Mississippi State (36–12)	Arkansas (34–18)	Arkansas (36–19)	Georgia Tech (50–11)	10.
11.	Coastal Carolina	Coastal Carolina (3–0)	Ole Miss (8–0)	Virginia (10–1)	North Carolina (13–3–1)	North Carolina (17–3–1)	North Carolina (20–4–1)	Auburn (20–7)	USC (27–6)	Oklahoma (24–11)	Florida State (28–11)	Kansas (33–11)	Texas A&M (35–10)	Florida State (36–15)	Florida State (37–16)	UCLA (52–8)	11.
12.	Florida State	Florida State (2–0)	Virginia (6–1)	Southern Miss (10–1)	Clemson (15–1)	NC State (16–4)	USC (24–1)	Oklahoma (19–8)	Southern Miss (23–9)	Coastal Carolina (26–9)	Florida (28–13)	Oklahoma (29–14)	Southern Miss (34–14)	Mississippi State (38–14)	West Virginia (37–13)	Kansas (45–18)	12.
13.	Tennessee	Tennessee (3–0)	TCU (2–5)	TCU (6–5)	LSU (12–5)	USC (19–1)	Oregon State (17–5)	West Virginia (19–5)	Oklahoma (21–10)	Florida State (24–11)	Mississippi State (30–10)	Southern Miss (31–13)	Florida (31–17)	West Virginia (35–12)	Texas A&M (39–13)	Oregon (43–18)	13.
14.	Virginia	Virginia (3–0)	Clemson (7–0)	Florida (11–1)	TCU (9–6)	Clemson (16–4)	NC State (18–6)	Florida (23–6)	Coastal Carolina (23–8)	Arkansas (24–13)	West Virginia (27–9)	Boston College (33–14)	Arkansas (32–17)	USC (41–12)	Kansas (39–16)	Mississippi State (43–19)	14.
15.	Oregon State	Oklahoma (3–0)	NC State (5–1)	Clemson (10–1)	NC State (14–2)	Oregon State (14–4)	West Virginia (16–4)	Arkansas (19–10)	NC State (21–11)	NC State (24–12)	Kansas (29–11)	Florida (29–16)	Florida State (33–14)	Texas A&M (37–12)	Alabama (37–18)	USC (48–18)	15.
16.	Ole Miss	Ole Miss (3–0)	Coastal Carolina (5–2)	NC State (10–1)	Ole Miss (15–2)	Southern Miss (16–4)	Southern Miss (19–5)	Southern Miss (21–7)	Texas A&M (25–6)	Alabama (26–11)	Southern Miss (28–12)	Arkansas (29–16)	Oklahoma (30–16)	Kansas (37–15)	Mississippi State (39–16)	Florida (41–21)	16.
17.	Vanderbilt	Oregon State (2–1)	Florida State (4–2)	Ole Miss (10–2)	Florida State (13–2)	Florida (18–3)	Ole Miss (19–6)	Oregon (23–5)	UCF (20–9)	Mississippi State (26–10)	Boston College (31–12)	Florida State (29–14)	USC (37–12)	Coastal Carolina (34–17)	Cincinnati (37–19)	Texas A&M (41–16)	17.
18.	Louisville	Clemson (3–0)	Southern Miss (6–1)	Florida State (8–2)	Wake Forest (15–1)	West Virginia (13–4)	Arizona State (17–6)	Coastal Carolina (20–7)	West Virginia (21–7)	West Virginia (24–8)	Arkansas (26–15)	Nebraska (33–11)	West Virginia (31–12)	Cincinnati (35–18)	Oregon (38–15)	Florida State (40–19)	18.
19.	Oklahoma	NC State (2–0)	Tennessee (5–2)	Tennessee (8–3)	Texas A&M (14–1)	Ole Miss (16–5)	Oregon (19–4)	Virginia (22–7)	Arizona State (23–9)	Kansas (26–10)	Alabama (28–13)	USC (34–11)	Arizona State (33–15)	Alabama (35–17)	Oklahoma State (36–19)	Cal Poly (39–24)	19.
20.	Clemson	West Virginia (3–0)	West Virginia (5–1)	Texas A&M (10–1)	USC (15–0)	Kentucky (18–2)	Tennessee (17–7)	NC State (18–10)	Nebraska (26–6)	Southern Miss (25–11)	Nebraska (31–9)	West Virginia (28–12)	Cincinnati (33–17)	Oklahoma (31–18)	Tennessee (37–19)	St. John's (36–26)	20.
21.	West Virginia	Southern Miss (2–1)	Texas A&M (7–0)	West Virginia (8–2)	Tennessee (12–4)	Texas A&M (16–3)	Kentucky (19–4)	Boston College (20–9)	Florida (21–10)	Arizona State (26–11)	USC (30–11)	Arizona State (31–14)	Boston College (35–16)	Oklahoma State (33–18)	Nebraska (41–14)	Little Rock (39–28)	21.
22.	Florida	Texas A&M (3–0)	Miami (FL) (9–0)	USC (11–0)	West Virginia (10–3)	Arkansas State (15–6)	Alabama (18–7)	Arizona State (20–8)	Arkansas (20–13)	Boston College (26–12)	Ole Miss (29–12)	Ole Miss (31–14)	Alabama (32–16)	Ole Miss (34–18)	USC (42–14)	Oregon State (45–14)	22.
23.	Southern Miss	Miami (FL) (3–0)	Florida (7–1)	Miami (FL) (10–2)	Oregon State (10–4)	Tennessee (14–6)	Coastal Carolina (15–8)	Texas A&M (22–5)	Boston College (22–11)	Virginia (26–11)	Arizona State (28–13)	Cincinnati (28–17)	Oregon (35–12)	Oregon (36–14)	UC Santa Barbara (37–16)	Arkansas (41–22)	23.
24.	East Carolina	Florida (2–1)	Oregon State (4–3)	Coastal Carolina (7–4)	UTSA (13–2)	Arizona State (14–5)	Clemson (18–7)	Nebraska (22–6)	Jacksonville State (27–6)	Ole Miss (26–11)	Virginia (28–13)	Tennessee (29–15)	Jacksonville State (38–10)	Tennessee (34–18)	Arizona State (36–18)	Southern Miss (44–17)	24.
25.	Miami (FL)	Kentucky (3–0)	Vanderbilt (6–2)	Oregon State (6–4)	Florida (14–3)	Oregon (17–3)	Cincinnati (19–7)	Kentucky (21–6)	Virginia (24–9)	Liberty (25–10)	Liberty (28–11)	Alabama (29–16)	Oklahoma State (31–17)	UC Santa Barbara (34–15)	Ole Miss (36–20)	Oklahoma State (39–22)	25.
	Preseason Jan 19	Week 1 Feb 16	Week 2 Feb 23	Week 3 Mar 2	Week 4 Mar 9	Week 5 Mar 16	Week 6 Mar 23	Week 7 Mar 30	Week 8 Apr 6	Week 9 Apr 13	Week 10 Apr 20	Week 11 Apr 27	Week 12 May 4	Week 13 May 11	Week 14 May 18	Final June 23	
		Dropped: No. 17 Vanderbilt; No. 18 Louisville; No. 24 East Carolina	Dropped: No. 25 Kentucky	Dropped: No. 25 Vanderbilt	Dropped: No. 23 Miami (FL); No. 24 Coastal Carolina	Dropped: No. 13 LSU; No. 14 TCU; No. 18 Wake Forest; No. 24 UTSA	Dropped: No. 17 Florida; No. 21 Texas A&M; No. 22 Arkansas State	Dropped: No. 17 Ole Miss; No. 20 Tennessee; No. 24 Clemson; No. 25 Cincinnati	Dropped: No. 17 Oregon; No. 25 Kentucky	Dropped: No. 17 UCF; No. 20 Nebraska; No. 24 Jacksonville State	Dropped: No. 15 NC State	Dropped: No. 24 Virginia; No. 25 Liberty	Dropped: No. 18 Nebraska; No. 22 Ole Miss; No. 24 Tennessee	Dropped: No. 19 Arizona State; No. 21 Boston College; No. 24 Jacksonville State	Dropped: No. 17 Coastal Carolina; No. 20 Oklahoma	Dropped: No. 17 Cincinnati; No. 18 Oregon; No. 20 Tennessee; No. 21 Nebraska; No. 23 UC Santa Barbara; No. 24 Arizona State	

== Perfect Game ==
	Preseason Jan 8	Week 1 Feb 16	Week 2 Feb 23	Week 3 Mar 2	Week 4 Mar 9	Week 5 Mar 16	Week 6 Mar 23	Week 7 Mar 30	Week 8 Apr 6	Week 9 Apr 13	Week 10 Apr 20	Week 11 Apr 27	Week 12 May 4	Week 13 May 11	Week 14 May 18	Final June 25	
1.	LSU	LSU (3–0)	LSU (8–0)	UCLA (9–2)	UCLA (13–2)	UCLA (17–2)	UCLA (21–2)	UCLA (25–2)	UCLA (29–2)	UCLA (33–2)	UCLA (36–3)	UCLA (39–4)	UCLA (43–4)	UCLA (46–5)	UCLA (48–6)	Oklahoma (43–23)	1.
2.	Georgia Tech	Georgia Tech (3–0)	Georgia Tech (8–0)	LSU (11–1)	Texas (15–0)	Texas (18–1)	Texas (20–3)	Texas (23–4)	Georgia Tech (26–5)	Georgia Tech (30–5)	North Carolina (33–7–1)	North Carolina (36–8–1)	North Carolina (37–9–1)	North Carolina (40–9–1)	North Carolina (43–10–1)	North Carolina (54–14–1)	2.
3.	Tennessee	Tennessee (3–0)	UCLA (6–1)	Georgia Tech (11–1)	Georgia Tech (14–2)	Georgia Tech (17–3)	Georgia Tech (19–5)	Georgia Tech (22–5)	Texas (26–5)	North Carolina (30–6–1)	Texas (30–8)	Georgia Tech (36–7)	Georgia Tech (39–8)	Georgia Tech (42–8)	Georgia Tech (45–9)	Georgia (53–14)	3.
4.	Arkansas	Arkansas (2–1)	Arkansas (6–1)	Mississippi State (11–1)	Mississippi State (14–2)	Auburn (17–2)	Arkansas (18–7)	Mississippi State (24–4)	Georgia (27–6)	Texas (27–7)	Georgia Tech (32–7)	Texas (32–9)	Texas (35–10)	Georgia (41–11)	Georgia (43–12)	West Virginia (47–17)	4.
5.	UCLA	UCLA (2–1)	Mississippi State (8–0)	Texas (11–0)	Auburn (13–2)	Arkansas (14–6)	USC (24–1)	Georgia (23–6)	Florida State (24–7)	Georgia (29–8)	Georgia (32–9)	Georgia (34–11)	Georgia (38–11)	Auburn (31–15)	Texas (40–12)	Texas (46–15)	5.
6.	Mississippi State	Mississippi State (3–0)	Texas (7–0)	Auburn (9–2)	Southern Miss (14–2)	Georgia (17–4)	Mississippi State (20–4)	Florida State (22–5)	North Carolina (27–5–1)	Oregon State (28–7)	Oregon State (30–8)	Oregon State (33–9)	Auburn (32–14)	Texas (37–12)	West Virginia (37–13)	Troy (39–32)	6.
7.	Oregon State	Oregon State (2–1)	Auburn (6–1)	Florida (11–1)	Arkansas (12–4)	Mississippi State (16–4)	Auburn (19–4)	USC (26–3)	Alabama (25–8)	Coastal Carolina (26–9)	Auburn (27–12)	Auburn (30–13)	Coastal Carolina (34–13)	West Virginia (35–12)	Florida State (38–16)	Alabama (42–21)	7.
8.	Texas	Texas (3–0)	Florida (7–1)	Southern Miss (10–1)	Georgia (15–3)	Oklahoma (17–3)	Georgia (20–5)	North Carolina (24–4–1)	Mississippi State (25–7)	Alabama (26–11)	Florida State (28–11)	Texas A&M (33–8)	Oregon (35–12)	Florida State (36–15)	Auburn (36–18)	Ole Miss (41–23)	8.
9.	Florida State	Florida State (2–0)	Oregon (8–0)	Arkansas (9–3)	Oklahoma (14–2)	Virginia (16–4)	Virginia (20–5)	Oregon State (21–5)	Oregon State (24–6)	USC (30–7)	Texas A&M (31–7)	Mississippi State (34–10)	Kansas (37–11)	Oregon State (40–11)	Oregon State (43–12)	Auburn (42–22)	9.
10.	Auburn	Auburn (3–0)	Southern Miss (6–1)	Oregon (10–1)	Virginia (13–3)	USC (19–1)	Florida State (19–4)	Oregon (23–5)	Coastal Carolina (23–8)	Auburn (24–11)	Coastal Carolina (28–11)	Coastal Carolina (30–13)	Oregon State (36–11)	Southern Miss (37–14)	Southern Miss (40–14)	Oregon (43–18)	10.
11.	TCU	TCU (2–1)	Georgia (6–1)	North Carolina (11–1–1)	Clemson (15–1)	Florida State (16–3)	Oklahoma (19–5)	West Virginia (19–5)	USC (27–6)	Florida (27–10)	West Virginia (27–9)	Oregon (32–11)	Texas A&M (35–10)	Oregon (36–14)	Oregon (38–15)	Mississippi State (43–19)	11.
12.	Florida	Florida (2–1)	Oklahoma (7–0)	Georgia (10–2)	USC (15–0)	Southern Miss (16–4)	Southern Miss (19–5)	Virginia (22–7)	Auburn (22–9)	Florida State (24–11)	Mississippi State (30–10)	Kansas (33–11)	Mississippi State (36–12)	Coastal Carolina (34–17)	Texas A&M (39–13)	Kansas (45–18)	12.
13.	Oregon	Oregon (4–0)	Tennessee (5–2)	Oklahoma (10–2)	NC State (14–2)	Oregon (17–3)	Oregon (19–4)	Southern Miss (21–7)	UCF (20–9)	West Virginia (24–8)	Boston College (31–12)	Boston College (33–14)	Southern Miss (34–14)	Texas A&M (37–12)	Alabama (37–18)	USC (48–18)	13.
14.	Virginia	Virginia (3–0)	Virginia (6–1)	NC State (10–1)	Oregon (12–3)	NC State (16–4)	North Carolina (20–4–1)	Coastal Carolina (20–7)	Nebraska (26–6)	Texas A&M (27–7)	Nebraska (31–9)	Nebraska (33–11)	Florida State (33–14)	Alabama (35–17)	Florida (37–18)	Cal Poly (39–24)	14.
15.	Georgia	Georgia (2–1)	Florida State (4–2)	Virginia (10–1)	Florida State (13–2)	North Carolina (17–3–1)	Oregon State (17–5)	Alabama (22–7)	Southern Miss (23–9)	Mississippi State (26–10)	Alabama (28–13)	Southern Miss (31–13)	West Virginia (31–12)	Mississippi State (38–14)	Nebraska (41–14)	Little Rock (39–28)	15.
16.	Louisville	Coastal Carolina (3–0)	Oregon State (4–3)	Florida State (8–2)	Wake Forest (15–1)	Kentucky (18–2)	NC State (18–6)	Florida (23–6)	West Virginia (21–7)	Virginia (26–11)	Oregon (28–11)	Florida State (29–14)	Arizona State (33–15)	USC (41–12)	Kansas (39–16)	St. John's (36–26)	16.
17.	Coastal Carolina	North Carolina (3–0)	North Carolina (6–1–1)	Tennessee (8–3)	LSU (12–5)	Florida (18–3)	Arizona State (17–6)	Auburn (20–7)	Virginia (24–9)	Oregon (26–10)	Virginia (28–13)	West Virginia (28–12)	Alabama (32–16)	Kansas (37–15)	Arkansas (36–19)	UCLA (52–8)	17.
18.	North Carolina	Southern Miss (2–1)	Coastal Carolina (5–2)	UTSA (10–1)	UTSA (13–2)	Oregon State (14–4)	West Virginia (16–4)	Arizona State (20–8)	Arizona State (23–9)	Arizona State (26–11)	Kansas (29–11)	Arizona State (31–14)	Boston College (35–16)	Florida (34–18)	Mississippi State (39–16)	Georgia Tech (50–11)	18.
19.	Vanderbilt	Clemson (3–0)	Clemson (7–0)	Clemson (10–1)	Tennessee (12–4)	Clemson (16–4)	Ole Miss (19–6)	Arkansas (19–10)	Texas A&M (25–6)	Boston College (26–10)	Ole Miss (29–12)	USC (34–11)	USC (37–12)	Nebraska (37–14)	USC (42–14)	Florida (41–21)	19.
20.	Clemson	NC State (2–0)	NC State (5–1)	USC (11–0)	North Carolina (13–3–1)	West Virginia (13–4)	Kentucky (19–4)	Nebraska (22–6)	Oregon (24–8)	Miami (FL) (27–9)	Florida (28–13)	Miami (FL) (32–12)	Florida (31–17)	Cincinnati (35–18)	Cincinnati (37–19)	Southern Miss (44–17)	20.
21.	UC Santa Barbara	Miami (FL) (3–0)	Miami (FL) (9–0)	Oregon State (6–4)	Oregon State (10–4)	Tennessee (14–6)	Tennessee (17–7)	Oklahoma (19–8)	Jacksonville State (27–6)	Kansas (26–10)	Arizona State (28–13)	Alabama (29–16)	Nebraska (34–14)	Arkansas (34–18)	Oklahoma State (36–19)	Florida State (40–19)	21.
22.	NC State	Oklahoma (3–0)	Vanderbilt (6–2)	UC Santa Barbara (8–2)	UC Santa Barbara (12–2)	Louisiana (15–5)	Nebraska (18–6)	UCF (18–8)	Florida (24–9)	Nebraska (27–9)	Southern Miss (28–12)	Ole Miss (31–14)	Cincinnati (32–17)	Boston College (36–17)	Coastal Carolina (36–19)	Texas A&M (41–16)	22.
23.	Southern Miss	Louisville (1–2)	UTSA (7–0)	Wake Forest (11–1)	Florida (14–3)	Wake Forest (15–5)	South Florida (20–4)	Jacksonville State (24–5)	Missouri State (21–9)	Missouri State (24–10)	Missouri State (26–11)	Florida (29–16)	Arkansas (32–17)	Oklahoma State (33–18)	Mercer (43–13)	Nebraska (43–17)	23.
24.	Miami (FL)	Vanderbilt (1–2)	UC Santa Barbara (4–2)	West Virginia (8–2)	Kentucky (14–2)	Kansas State (15–5)	Coastal Carolina (16–7)	Boston College (20–9)	Miami (FL) (24–8)	UCF (20–12)	USC (30–11)	Virginia (29–16)	Virginia (32–16)	Ole Miss (34–18)	Arizona State (36–18)	Arkansas (41–22)	24.
25.	East Carolina	UC Santa Barbara (1–2)	USC (7–0)	Kentucky (9–2)	West Virginia (10–3)	South Florida (17–3)	Jacksonville State (21–4)	Texas A&M (22–5)	Boston College (22–11)	Ole Miss (26–11)	Miami (FL) (29–11)	Liberty (31–13)	Liberty (35–13)	Arizona State (34–17)	Tennessee (37–19)	Tennessee (38–22)	25.
	Preseason Jan 8	Week 1 Feb 16	Week 2 Feb 23	Week 3 Mar 2	Week 4 Mar 9	Week 5 Mar 16	Week 6 Mar 23	Week 7 Mar 30	Week 8 Apr 6	Week 9 Apr 13	Week 10 Apr 20	Week 11 Apr 27	Week 12 May 4	Week 13 May 11	Week 14 May 18	Final June 25	
		Dropped: No. 25 East Carolina	Dropped: No. 11 TCU; No. 23 Louisville	Dropped: No. 18 Coastal Carolina; No. 21 Miami (FL); No. 22 Vanderbilt	None	Dropped: No. 17 LSU; No. 18 UTSA; No. 22 UC Santa Barbara	Dropped: No. 17 Florida; No. 19 Clemson; No. 22 Louisiana; No. 23 Wake Forest; No. 24 Kansas State	Dropped: No. 16 NC State; No. 19 Ole Miss; No. 20 Kentucky; No. 21 Tennessee; No. 23 South Florida	Dropped: No. 19 Arkansas; No. 21 Oklahoma	Dropped: No. 15 Southern Miss; No. 21 Jacksonville State	Dropped: No. 24 UCF	Dropped: No. 23 Missouri State	Dropped: No. 20 Miami (FL); No. 22 Ole Miss	Dropped: No. 24 Virginia; No. 25 Liberty	Dropped: No. 22 Boston College; No. 24 Ole Miss	Dropped: No. 9 Oregon State; No. 20 Cincinnati; No. 21 Oklahoma State; No. 22 Coastal Carolina; No. 23 Mercer; No. 24 Arizona State	

== NCBWA ==
	Preseason Feb 9	Week 1 Feb 16	Week 2 Feb 23	Week 3 Mar 2	Week 4 Mar 9	Week 5 Mar 16	Week 6 Mar 23	Week 7 Mar 30	Week 8 Apr 6	Week 9 Apr 13	Week 10 Apr 20	Week 11 Apr 27	Week 12 May 4	Week 13 May 11	Week 14 May 18	Week 15 June 2	Final June 23	
1.	LSU	LSU (3–0)	LSU (8–0)	UCLA (9–2)	UCLA (13–2)	UCLA (17–2)	UCLA (21–2)	UCLA (25–2)	UCLA (29–2)	UCLA (33–2)	UCLA (36–3)	UCLA (39–3)	UCLA (43–4)	UCLA (46–5)	UCLA (48–6)	Georgia (49–12)	Oklahoma (43–23)	1.
2.	UCLA	Texas (3–0)	UCLA (6–1)	LSU (11–1)	Texas (15–0)	Texas (18–1)	Texas (20–3)	Texas (23–4)	Texas (26–5)	Georgia Tech (30–5)	North Carolina (33–7–1)	North Carolina (36–8–1)	North Carolina (37–9–1)	North Carolina (40–9–1)	Georgia Tech (45–9)	North Carolina (48–11–1)	North Carolina (54–14–1)	2.
3.	Texas	UCLA (2–1)	Texas (7–0)	Texas (11–0)	Mississippi State (14–2)	Georgia Tech (17–3)	Georgia Tech (19–5)	Georgia Tech (22–5)	Georgia Tech (26–5)	North Carolina (30–6–1)	Georgia Tech (32–7)	Georgia Tech (36–7)	Georgia Tech (39–8)	Georgia Tech (42–8)	North Carolina (43–10–1)	Texas (43–13)	Georgia (53–14)	3.
4.	Georgia Tech	Georgia Tech (3–0)	Georgia Tech (8–0)	Georgia Tech (11–1)	Georgia Tech (14–2)	Auburn (17–2)	Mississippi State (20–4)	Mississippi State (23–4)	Georgia (27–6)	Texas (27–7)	Texas (30–8)	Texas (32–9)	Texas (35–10)	Georgia (41–11)	Georgia (43–12)	Auburn (42–20)	West Virginia (47–17)	4.
5.	Arkansas	Mississippi State (3–0)	Mississippi State (8–0)	Mississippi State (11–1)	Auburn (13–2)	Arkansas (14–6)	Auburn (19–4)	Georgia (23–6)	North Carolina (27–5–1)	Oregon State (28–7)	Georgia (32–9)	Oregon State (33–9)	Georgia (38–11)	Auburn (35–15)	Texas (40–12)	West Virginia (43–15)	Texas (46–15)	5.
6.	Mississippi State	Coastal Carolina (3–0)	Arkansas (6–1)	North Carolina (11–1–1)	Arkansas (12–4)	Mississippi State (16–4)	Arkansas (18–7)	North Carolina (24–4–1)	Florida State (24–7)	Georgia (29–8)	Oregon State (30–8)	Georgia (34–11)	Auburn (32–14)	Oregon State (40–11)	Oregon State (43–12)	Oregon (42–16)	Troy (39–32)	6.
7.	Coastal Carolina	Auburn (3–0)	Auburn (6–1)	Auburn (9–2)	Southern Miss (14–2)	Georgia (17–4)	Georgia (20–5)	Florida State (21–6)	Oregon State (24–6)	Coastal Carolina (26–9)	Florida State (28–11)	Texas A&M (31–8)	Oregon State (36–11)	Texas (37–12)	Auburn (36–18)	Mississippi State (43–17)	Alabama (42–21)	7.
8.	Auburn	Arkansas (2–1)	North Carolina (6–1–1)	Arkansas (9–3)	Clemson (15–1)	Oklahoma (17–3)	Florida State (19–4)	Oregon State (21–5)	Mississippi State (25–7)	USC (30–7)	Texas A&M (31–7)	Auburn (30–13)	Coastal Carolina (33–14)	Southern Miss (37–14)	Southern Miss (40–14)	Kansas (45–16)	Ole Miss (41–23)	8.
9.	TCU	North Carolina (3–0)	Georgia (6–1)	Florida (11–1)	LSU (12–5)	North Carolina (17–3–1)	North Carolina (20–4–1)	USC (26–3)	Alabama (25–8)	Florida State (24–11)	Coastal Carolina (28–11)	Mississippi State (34–10)	Kansas (37–11)	West Virginia (35–12)	West Virginia (37–13)	Alabama (40–19)	Auburn (42–22)	9.
10.	Louisville	TCU (2–1)	Coastal Carolina (5–2)	Clemson (10–1)	Georgia (15–3)	Florida State (16–3)	Oklahoma (19–5)	Southern Miss (21–7)	Coastal Carolina (23–8)	Texas A&M (27–7)	West Virginia (27–9)	Coastal Carolina (30–13)	Texas A&M (35–10)	Florida State (36–15)	Florida State (38–16)	USC (47–16)	Mississippi State (43–19)	10.
11.	Oregon State	Florida State (2–0)	Florida (7–1)	Southern Miss (10–1)	Oklahoma (14–2)	Southern Miss (16–4)	Virginia (20–5)	West Virginia (19–5)	Southern Miss (23–9)	West Virginia (24–8)	Auburn (27–12)	Kansas (33–11)	Mississippi State (36–12)	Texas A&M (37–12)	Texas A&M (39–13)	Georgia Tech (50–11)	Oregon (43–18)	11.
12.	North Carolina	Tennessee (3–0)	Clemson (7–0)	Georgia (10–2)	North Carolina (13–3–1)	Virginia (16–4)	USC (24–1)	Auburn (20–7)	Auburn (22–9)	Auburn (24–11)	Oklahoma (27–12)	Southern Miss (31–13)	Southern Miss (34–14)	Arkansas (34–18)	Oregon (38–15)	UCLA (52–8)	Kansas (45–18)	12.
13.	Georgia	Oregon State (2–1)	Oklahoma (7–0)	NC State (10–1)	Wake Forest (15–1)	NC State (16–4)	Southern Miss (19–5)	Coastal Carolina (20–7)	USC (27–6)	Florida (27–10)	Mississippi State (30–10)	Florida State (29–14)	Florida State (33–14)	Mississippi State (38–14)	Arkansas (36–19)	Ole Miss (39–21)	Georgia Tech (50–11)	13.
14.	Florida State	Georgia (2–1)	Southern Miss (6–1)	Oklahoma (10–2)	NC State (14–2)	Florida (18–3)	Oregon State (17–5)	Oregon (23–5)	Nebraska (26–6)	Oklahoma (24–11)	Virginia (28–13)	Oregon (32–11)	West Virginia (31–12)	USC (41–12)	Kansas (39–16)	Oklahoma (35–22)	USC (48–18)	14.
15.	Tennessee	Clemson (3–0)	NC State (5–1)	Florida State (8–2)	Florida State (13–2)	Clemson (16–4)	West Virginia (16–4)	Arkansas (19–10)	West Virginia (21–7)	Mississippi State (26–10)	Alabama (28–13)	Oklahoma (29–14)	Oregon (35–12)	Oregon (36–14)	Alabama (37–18)	Troy (36–30)	UCLA (52–8)	15.
16.	Florida	Florida (2–1)	Miami (FL) (9–0)	Coastal Carolina (7–4)	Florida (14–3)	Oregon State (14–4)	Coastal Carolina (16–7)	Oklahoma (19–8)	Texas A&M (25–6)	Alabama (26–11)	Southern Miss (28–12)	West Virginia (28–12)	Arkansas (32–17)	Coastal Carolina (34–17)	Mississippi State (39–16)	Texas A&M (41–16)	Texas A&M (41–16)	16.
17.	Clemson	NC State (2–0)	Florida State (4–2)	Wake Forest (11–1)	Texas A&M (14–1)	USC (19–1)	NC State (18–6)	Alabama (22–7)	UCF (20–9)	Southern Miss (25–11)	Kansas (29–11)	Nebraska (33–11)	USC (36–12)	Kansas (37–15)	Florida (37–18)	Florida (41–21)	Florida (41–21)	17.
18.	Vanderbilt	Kentucky (3–0)	Texas A&M (7–0)	Texas A&M (10–1)	Virginia (13–3)	Coastal Carolina (13–6)	Oregon (19–4)	Florida (23–6)	Florida (24–9)	Arkansas (24–13)	Oregon (28–11)	Ole Miss (31–14)	Alabama (32–16)	Alabama (35–17)	USC (42–14)	Cal Poly (39–22)	Little Rock (39–28)	18.
19.	NC State	Oklahoma (3–0)	Oregon State (4–3)	Tennessee (8–3)	Oregon State (10–4)	Kentucky (18–2)	Kentucky (19–4)	Virginia (22–7)	Oklahoma (21–10)	Virginia (26–11)	Ole Miss (29–12)	Arkansas (29–16)	Arizona State (31–14)	Florida (34–18)	Nebraska (41–14)	Little Rock (39–26)	Cal Poly (39–24)	19.
20.	Southern Miss	Miami (FL) (3–0)	Tennessee (5–2)	TCU (6–5)	USC (15–0)	LSU (14–7)	Ole Miss (19–6)	Nebraska (22–6)	Virginia (24–9)	Oregon (26–10)	Nebraska (31–9)	USC (34–11)	Oklahoma (30–16)	Ole Miss (34–18)	Oklahoma State (36–19)	St. John's (36–24)	Florida State (40–19)	20.
21.	Kentucky	Louisville (1–2)	West Virginia (6–0)	West Virginia (8–2)	TCU (9–6)	West Virginia (13–4)	Arizona State (17–6)	Texas A&M (22–5)	Arizona State (23–9)	Arizona State (26–11)	Arkansas (26–15)	Boston College (33–14)	Florida (31–17)	Nebraska (37–14)	Ole Miss (36–20)	Florida State (40–19)	St. John's (36–26)	21.
22.	Miami (FL)	Southern Miss (2–1)	Wake Forest (6–1)	Oregon State (6–4)	Coastal Carolina (9–6)	Oregon (17–3)	Florida (19–6)	Arizona State (20–8)	Oregon (24–8)	Ole Miss (26–11)	Boston College (31–12)	Arizona State (31–14)	Virginia (32–16)	Oklahoma State (33–17)	Coastal Carolina (36–19)	Oregon State (45–14)	Arkansas (41–22)	22.
23.	Arizona	West Virginia (3–0)	TCU (2–5)	Miami (FL) (10–2)	West Virginia (10–3)	Texas A&M (16–3)	Tennessee (17–7)	Kentucky (21–6)	Arkansas (20–13)	Kansas (26–10)	USC (30–11)	Virginia (29–16)	Ole Miss (32–17)	Arizona State (34–17)	Arizona State (36–18)	Arkansas (41–22)	Southern Miss (44–17)	23.
24.	Virginia	Virginia (3–0)	Virginia (6–1)	Oregon (10–1)	Tennessee (12–4)	Wake Forest (15–5)	Clemson (18–7)	Jacksonville State (24–5)	Jacksonville State (27–6)	Nebraska (27–9)	Florida (28–13)	Alabama (29–16)	Jacksonville State (38–10)	Jacksonville State (40–11)	Tennessee (36–19)	Southern Miss (44–17)	Oregon State (45–14)	24.
25.	Wake Forest	Texas A&M (3–0)	Ole Miss (8–0)	Virginia (10–1)	Kentucky (14–2)	Louisiana (15–5)	Alabama (18–7)	Boston College (20–9)	Boston College (22–11)	Boston College (26–12)	Arizona State (28–13)	Jacksonville State (36–9)	Boston College (35–16)	Boston College (36–17)	Jacksonville State (42–13)	Kentucky (33–23)	Nebraska (43–17)	25.
	Preseason Feb 9	Week 1 Feb 16	Week 2 Feb 23	Week 3 Mar 2	Week 4 Mar 9	Week 5 Mar 16	Week 6 Mar 23	Week 7 Mar 30	Week 8 Apr 6	Week 9 Apr 13	Week 10 Apr 20	Week 11 Apr 27	Week 12 May 4	Week 13 May 11	Week 14 May 18	Week 15 June 2	Final June 23	
		Dropped: No. 18 Vanderbilt; No. 23 Arizona; No. 25 Wake Forest	Dropped: No. 18 Kentucky; No. 21 Louisville	Dropped: No. 25 Ole Miss	Dropped: No. 23 Miami (FL); No. 24 Oregon	Dropped: No. 21 TCU; No. 24 Tennessee	Dropped: No. 20 LSU; No. 23 Texas A&M; No. 24 Wake Forest; No. 25 Louisiana	Dropped: No. 17 NC State; No. 20 Ole Miss; No. 23 Tennessee; No. 24 Clemson	Dropped: No. 23 Kentucky	Dropped: No. 17 UCF; No. 24 Jacksonville State	None	Dropped: No. 24 Florida	Dropped: No. 17 Nebraska	Dropped: No. 20 Oklahoma; No. 22 Virginia	Dropped: No. 25 Boston College	Dropped: No. 18 Nebraska; No. 20 Oklahoma State; No. 22 Arizona State; No. 23 Jacksonville State; No. 24 Tennessee; No. 25 Coastal Carolina	Dropped: No. 25 Kentucky	

The Preseason poll ranked the top 30 teams in the nation. Teams not listed above are: 26. Texas A&M; 27. West Virginia; 28. Ole Miss; 29. East Carolina; 30. Oregon

== D1Baseball ==
	Preseason Jan 12	Week 1 Feb 16	Week 2 Feb 23	Week 3 Mar 2	Week 4 Mar 9	Week 5 Mar 16	Week 6 Mar 23	Week 7 Mar 30	Week 8 Apr 6	Week 9 Apr 13	Week 10 Apr 20	Week 11 Apr 27	Week 12 May 4	Week 13 May 11	Week 14 May 18	Week 15 May 26	Final June 23	
1.	UCLA	UCLA (2–1)	UCLA (6–1)	UCLA (9–2)	UCLA (13–2)	UCLA (17–2)	UCLA (21–2)	UCLA (25–2)	UCLA (29–2)	UCLA (33–2)	UCLA (36–3)	UCLA (39–4)	UCLA (43–4)	UCLA (46–5)	UCLA (48–6)	UCLA (51–6)	Oklahoma (43–23)	1.
2.	LSU	LSU (3–0)	LSU (8–0)	LSU (11–1)	Texas (15–0)	Texas (18–1)	Texas (20–3)	Texas (23–4)	Texas (26–5)	Georgia Tech (30–5)	North Carolina (33–7–1)	North Carolina (36–8–1)	North Carolina (37–9–1)	North Carolina (40–9–1)	North Carolina (43–10–1)	Georgia Tech (48–9)	North Carolina (54–14–1)	2.
3.	Texas	Texas (3–0)	Texas (7–0)	Texas (11–0)	Mississippi State (14–2)	Georgia Tech (17–3)	Georgia Tech (19–5)	Georgia Tech (22–5)	Georgia Tech (26–5)	North Carolina (30–6–1)	Georgia Tech (32–7)	Georgia Tech (36–7)	Georgia Tech (39–8)	Georgia Tech (42–8)	Georgia Tech (45–9)	Georgia (46–12)	Georgia (53–14)	3.
4.	Mississippi State	Mississippi State (3–0)	Mississippi State (8–0)	Mississippi State (11–1)	Georgia Tech (14–2)	Arkansas (14–6)	Arkansas (18–7)	Mississippi State (24–4)	Georgia (27–6)	Texas (27–7)	Texas (30–8)	Texas (32–9)	Texas (35–10)	Georgia (41–11)	Georgia (43–12)	North Carolina (45–11–1)	West Virginia (47–17)	4.
5.	Georgia Tech	Georgia Tech (3–0)	Georgia Tech (8–0)	Georgia Tech (11–1)	Arkansas (12–4)	Auburn (17–2)	Auburn (19–4)	Georgia (23–6)	Florida State (24–7)	Georgia (29–8)	Georgia (32–9)	Georgia (34–11)	Georgia (38–11)	Auburn (35–15)	Texas (40–12)	Auburn (38–19)	Texas (46–15)	5.
6.	Coastal Carolina	Coastal Carolina (3–0)	Arkansas (6–1)	Arkansas (9–3)	Auburn (13–2)	Mississippi State (16–4)	Mississippi State (20–4)	North Carolina (24–4–1)	North Carolina (27–5–1)	Oregon State (28–7)	Oregon State (30–8)	Oregon State (33–9)	Auburn (32–14)	Texas (37–12)	Auburn (36–18)	Texas (40–13)	Alabama (42–21)	6.
7.	Arkansas	TCU (2–1)	Auburn (6–1)	Auburn (9–2)	Southern Miss (14–2)	Georgia (17–4)	Georgia (20–5)	Florida State (21–6)	Oregon State (24–6)	Coastal Carolina (26–9)	Texas A&M (31–7)	Texas A&M (33–8)	Kansas (37–11)	Oregon State (40–11)	Oregon State (43–12)	Southern Miss (44–15)	Ole Miss (41–23)	7.
8.	Louisville	Arkansas (2–1)	North Carolina (6–1–1)	North Carolina (11–1–1)	Georgia (15–3)	Oklahoma (17–3)	Oklahoma (19–5)	Southern Miss (21–7)	Alabama (25–8)	Florida State (24–11)	Florida State (28–11)	Auburn (30–13)	Coastal Carolina (33–14)	Southern Miss (37–14)	Southern Miss (40–14)	Oregon State (43–12)	Troy (39–32)	8.
9.	Auburn	Auburn (3–0)	Coastal Carolina (5–2)	Florida (11–1)	Oklahoma (14–2)	Virginia (16–4)	Virginia (20–5)	Oregon State (21–5)	Mississippi State (25–7)	Virginia (26–11)	Coastal Carolina (28–11)	Coastal Carolina (30–13)	Texas A&M (35–10)	West Virginia (35–12)	West Virginia (37–13)	West Virginia (39–14)	Auburn (42–22)	9.
10.	TCU	North Carolina (3–0)	Florida (7–1)	Southern Miss (10–1)	NC State (14–2)	NC State (16–4)	Florida State (19–4)	Virginia (22–7)	Southern Miss (23–9)	Texas A&M (27–7)	Virginia (28–13)	Mississippi State (34–10)	Oregon State (36–11)	Texas A&M (37–12)	Texas A&M (39–13)	Florida (39–19)	Georgia Tech (50–11)	10.
11.	North Carolina	Oregon State (2–1)	Georgia (6–1)	Georgia (10–2)	Clemson (15–1)	Florida State (16–3)	Southern Miss (19–5)	Oklahoma (19–8)	Coastal Carolina (23–8)	Alabama (26–11)	Auburn (27–12)	Kansas (33–11)	Mississippi State (36–12)	Florida State (36–15)	Florida State (38–16)	Texas A&M (39–14)	UCLA (52–8)	11.
12.	Oregon State	Florida (2–1)	Southern Miss (6–1)	Oklahoma (10–2)	Wake Forest (15–1)	Southern Miss (16–4)	USC (24–1)	USC (26–3)	UCF (20–9)	USC (30–7)	West Virginia (27–9)	Southern Miss (31–13)	Southern Miss (34–14)	Arkansas (34–18)	Arkansas (36–19)	Florida State (38–17)	Kansas (45–18)	12.
13.	Florida	Tennessee (3–0)	Oklahoma (7–0)	NC State (10–1)	LSU (12–5)	USC (19–1)	North Carolina (20–4–1)	West Virginia (19–5)	Virginia (24–9)	Auburn (24–11)	Alabama (28–13)	Oregon (32–11)	Oregon (35–12)	Mississippi State (38–14)	Kansas (39–16)	Kansas (42–16)	Oregon (43–18)	13.
14.	Tennessee	Georgia (2–1)	NC State (5–1)	Clemson (10–1)	Virginia (13–3)	North Carolina (17–3–1)	NC State (18–6)	Coastal Carolina (20–7)	USC (27–6)	Oklahoma (24–11)	Oklahoma (27–12)	Florida State (29–14)	Florida State (33–14)	Kansas (37–15)	Oregon (38–15)	Arkansas (39–20)	Mississippi State (43–19)	14.
15.	Georgia	Louisville (1–2)	Clemson (7–0)	Wake Forest (11–1)	North Carolina (13–3–1)	Kentucky (18–2)	Coastal Carolina (16–7)	Oregon (23–5)	Auburn (22–9)	West Virginia (24–8)	Mississippi State (30–10)	Oklahoma (29–14)	West Virginia (31–12)	Ole Miss (34–18)	Alabama (37–18)	Oregon (40–16)	USC (48–18)	15.
16.	Florida State	Florida State (2–0)	Wake Forest (6–1)	Coastal Carolina (7–4)	Coastal Carolina (9–6)	Coastal Carolina (13–6)	Oregon State (17–5)	Alabama (22–7)	Oklahoma (21–10)	Arkansas (24–13)	Kansas (29–11)	Nebraska (33–11)	Arizona State (33–15)	Oregon (36–14)	Mississippi State (39–16)	Alabama (37–19)	Florida (41–21)	16.
17.	NC State	NC State (2–0)	Miami (FL) (9–0)	TCU (6–5)	TCU (9–6)	Oregon State (14–4)	West Virginia (16–4)	Arkansas (19–10)	West Virginia (21–7)	Mississippi State (26–10)	Ole Miss (29–12)	Ole Miss (31–14)	Arkansas (32–17)	USC (41–12)	Ole Miss (36–20)	Mississippi State (40–17)	Texas A&M (41–16)	17.
18.	Kentucky	Kentucky (3–0)	TCU (2–5)	Oregon State (6–4)	Oregon State (10–4)	Florida (18–3)	Ole Miss (19–6)	Auburn (20–7)	Texas A&M (25–6)	Kansas (26–10)	Southern Miss (28–12)	West Virginia (28–12)	USC (37–12)	Alabama (35–17)	Florida (37–18)	Ole Miss (36–21)	Florida State (40–19)	18.
19.	Clemson	Clemson (3–0)	Oregon State (4–3)	Tennessee (8–3)	Tennessee (12–4)	Clemson (16–4)	Kentucky (19–4)	Nebraska (22–6)	Nebraska (26–6)	Oregon (26–10)	Oregon (28–11)	Arizona State (31–14)	Alabama (32–16)	Florida (34–18)	Oklahoma State (36–19)	Oklahoma State (37–20)	Cal Poly (39–24)	19.
20.	Southern Miss	Southern Miss (2–1)	Tennessee (5–2)	Florida State (8–2)	Florida State (13–2)	West Virginia (13–4)	Oregon (19–4)	Texas A&M (22–5)	Arizona State (23–9)	Florida (27–10)	Nebraska (31–9)	Boston College (33–14)	Ole Miss (32–17)	Coastal Carolina (34–17)	Nebraska (41–14)	Nebraska (42–15)	St. John's (36–26)	20.
21.	Wake Forest	Oklahoma (3–0)	Florida State (4–2)	Kentucky (9–2)	Kentucky (14–2)	Oregon (17–3)	Tennessee (17–7)	Florida (23–6)	Oregon (24–8)	UCF (20–12)	Florida (28–13)	USC (34–11)	Florida (31–17)	Oklahoma State (33–18)	Arizona State (36–18)	Jacksonville State (46–13)	Little Rock (39–28)	21.
22.	Miami (FL)	Wake Forest (2–1)	Kentucky (5–2)	Texas A&M (10–1)	Texas A&M (14–1)	Tennessee (14–6)	Arizona State (17–6)	Boston College (20–9)	Arkansas (20–13)	Southern Miss (25–11)	Boston College (31–12)	Arkansas (29–16)	Boston College (35–16)	Arizona State (34–17)	Cincinnati (37–19)	Arizona State (37–19)	Oregon State (45–14)	22.
23.	Vanderbilt	Miami (FL) (3–0)	Texas A&M (7–0)	West Virginia (8–2)	Florida (14–3)	Texas A&M (16–3)	Notre Dame (14–6)	UCF (18–8)	Boston College (22–11)	Arizona State (26–12)	USC (30–11)	Virginia (29–16)	Virginia (32–16)	Boston College (36–17)	Tennessee (37–19)	Tennessee (38–20)	Arkansas (41–22)	23.
24.	Arizona	Texas A&M (3–0)	West Virginia (5–1)	Miami (FL) (10–2)	UTSA (13–2)	Wake Forest (15–5)	Nebraska (18–6)	Kentucky (21–6)	LSU (22–11)	Boston College (26–12)	Arkansas (26–15)	Alabama (29–16)	Oklahoma (30–16)	Nebraska (37–14)	Coastal Carolina (36–19)	Cincinnati (37–20)	Southern Miss (44–17)	24.
25.	Texas A&M	West Virginia (3–0)	Ole Miss (8–0)	UTSA (10–1)	USC (15–0)	Louisiana (15–5)	Texas A&M (18–5)	Arizona State (20–8)	Ole Miss (22–11)	Ole Miss (26–11)	Arizona State (28–13)	Florida (29–16)	Nebraska (34–14)	Cincinnati (35–18)	USC (42–14)	Louisiana (39–23)	Oklahoma State (39–22)	25.
	Preseason Jan 12	Week 1 Feb 16	Week 2 Feb 23	Week 3 Mar 2	Week 4 Mar 9	Week 5 Mar 16	Week 6 Mar 23	Week 7 Mar 30	Week 8 Apr 6	Week 9 Apr 13	Week 10 Apr 20	Week 11 Apr 27	Week 12 May 4	Week 13 May 11	Week 14 May 18	Week 15 May 26	Final June 23	
		Dropped: No. 23 Vanderbilt; No. 24 Arizona	Dropped: No. 15 Louisville	Dropped: No. 25 Ole Miss	Dropped: No. 23 West Virginia; No. 24 Miami (FL)	Dropped: No. 13 LSU; No. 17 TCU; No. 24 UTSA	Dropped: No. 18 Florida; No. 19 Clemson; No. 24 Wake Forest; No. 25 Louisiana	Dropped: No. 14 NC State; No. 18 Ole Miss; No. 21 Tennessee; No. 23 Notre Dame	Dropped: No. 21 Florida; No. 24 Kentucky	Dropped: No. 19 Nebraska; No. 24 LSU	Dropped: No. 21 UCF	None	None	Dropped: No. 23 Virginia; No. 24 Oklahoma	Dropped: No. 23 Boston College	Dropped: No. 24 Coastal Carolina; No. 25 USC	Dropped: No. 20 Nebraska; No. 21 Jacksonville State; No. 22 Arizona State; No. 23 Tennessee; No. 24 Cincinnati; No. 25 Louisiana	
