= 2026 Virginia Tech Hokies baseball team =

American college baseball season

2026 Virginia Tech Hokies baseball

NCAA Los Angeles Regional, 0–2
- Conference: Atlantic Coast Conference
- Record: 30–26 (15–15 ACC)
- Head coach: John Szefc (9th season)
- Assistant coach: Tyler Hanson (7th season)
- Hitting coach: Kurt Elbin (5th season)
- Pitching coach: Doug Willey (1st season)
- Home stadium: English Field

2026 Atlantic Coast Conference baseball standings
	Conf.						Overall
Team	W		L		T	PCT	W		L		T	PCT
No. 2 Georgia Tech ‍†‍‡‍^{y}	25	–	5	–	0	.833	45	–	9	–	0	.833
No. 4 North Carolina ‍‍‍^{y}	22	–	8	–	0	.733	43	–	10	–	1	.806
No. 12 Florida State ‍‍‍^{y}	19	–	11	–	0	.633	38	–	16	–	0	.704
Boston College ‍‍‍^{y}	17	–	13	–	0	.567	36	–	20	–	0	.643
Wake Forest ‍‍‍^{y}	16	–	14	–	0	.533	38	–	18	–	0	.679
Miami (FL) ‍‍‍^{y}	16	–	14	–	0	.533	36	–	17	–	0	.679
Virginia Tech ‍‍‍^{y}	15	–	15	–	0	.500	29	–	23	–	0	.558
Virginia ‍‍‍^{y}	14	–	16	–	0	.467	36	–	20	–	0	.643
NC State ‍‍‍^{y}	14	–	16	–	0	.467	32	–	21	–	0	.604
Louisville ‍‍‍	13	–	17	–	0	.433	30	–	26	–	0	.536
Notre Dame ‍‍‍	13	–	17	–	0	.433	30	–	21	–	0	.588
Stanford ‍‍‍	13	–	17	–	0	.433	28	–	25	–	0	.528
California ‍‍‍	12	–	18	–	0	.400	29	–	26	–	0	.527
Pittsburgh ‍‍‍	11	–	19	–	0	.367	30	–	23	–	0	.566
Clemson ‍‍‍	10	–	20	–	0	.333	31	–	25	–	0	.554
Duke ‍‍‍	10	–	20	–	0	.333	25	–	31	–	0	.446
† – Conference champion ‡ – Tournament champion y – Invited to the NCAA Tournament; As of May 17, 2026; Rankings from D1Baseball

The 2026 Virginia Tech Hokies baseball team represents Virginia Tech during the 2026 NCAA Division I baseball season. The Hokies play their home games at English Field as a member of the Atlantic Coast Conference. They are be led by ninth-year head coach John Szefc.

== Previous season ==
The Hokies are coming off a 31–25 (12–18) season, where they went 1–1 in the 2025 Atlantic Coast Conference baseball tournament. The Hokies did not earn an at-large berth into the 2025 NCAA Division I baseball tournament.

== Preseason ==
=== Coaches poll ===
The coaches poll was released on January 29, 2026. Virginia Tech was selected to finish eleventh in the conference.

ACC coaches poll
Predicted finish	Team	Votes (1st place)
1	Georgia Tech	237 (7)
2	North Carolina	236 (6)
3	Florida State	221 (1)
4	Louisville	196
5	Clemson	185 (2)
6	NC State	169
7	Virginia	165
8	Miami	159
9	Wake Forest	145
10	Stanford	99
11	Virginia Tech	89
12	Notre Dame	87
13	Duke	67
14	Pittsburgh	45
15	California	41
16	Boston College	35

== Schedule ==
2026 Virginia Tech Hokies baseball game log (30–26)
Regular season: 29–23 (Home: 19–10; Away: 10–10; Neutral: 0–3)

February: 7–3 (Home: 6–1; Away: 1–0; Neutral: 0–2)
Date	TV	Opponent	Rank	Stadium	Score	Win	Loss	Save	Attendance	Overall	ACC
February 13	ACCNX	William & Mary*		E.R. English Field; Blacksburg, VA	**W** 9–2	**Crowl** (1–0)	Seneker (0–1)	None	917	1–0	—
February 14	ACCNX	William & Mary*		E.R. English Field	**W** 8–7	**Craytor** (1–0)	Jernigan (0–1)	None	1,642	2–0	—
February 15	ACCNX	William & Mary*		E.R. English Field	**W** 8–2	**Weber** (1–0)	Richwine (0–1)	None	1,139	3–0	—
February 17	ACCNX	ETSU*		E.R. English Field	**W** 7–5	**Swift** (1–0)	Costarelli (0–1)	**Yagesh** (1)	893	4–0	—
February 20	ACCNX	Rutgers*		E.R. English Field; Blacksburg, VA	**L** 1–16^{8}	Mazza (1–1)	**Renfrow** (0–1)	None	1,052	4–1	—
February 21	ACCNX	Rutgers*		E.R. English Field	**W** 9–8^{10}	**Yagesh** (1–0)	Savinon (0–1)	None	1,254	5–1	—
February 22	ACCNX	Rutgers*		E.R. English Field	**W** 4–3	**Smith** (1–0)	Sand (1–1)	**Craytor** (1)	894	6–1	—
February 24	ESPN+	at James Madison*		Veterans Memorial Park; Harrisonburg, VA	**W** 5–4	**Roe** (1–0)	Bauer (0–2)	**Smith** (1)	422	7–1	—
Amegy Bank College Baseball Series
February 27	FloSports	vs. No. 23 Texas A&M*		Globe Life Field; Arlington, TX	**L** 0–10^{7}	Sdao (2–0)	**Renfrow** (0–2)	None	7,181	7–2	—
February 28	FloSports	vs. No. 4 Mississippi State*		Globe Life Field	**L** 8–15	Valincius (3–0)	**Stieg** (0–1)	None	13,097	7–3	—

March: 7–10 (Home: 4–4; Away: 3–5; Neutral: 0–1)
Date	TV	Opponent	Rank	Stadium	Score	Win	Loss	Save	Attendance	Overall	ACC
Amegy Bank College Baseball Series
March 1	FloSports	vs. Tennessee*		Globe Life Field	**L** 1–3	Hindy (1–0)	**Grim** (0–1)	Krenzel (1)	8,903	7–4	—
March 3	ACCNX	Marshall*		E.R. English Field	**L** 4–13	Landen (1–1)	**Weber** (1–1)	Krenzel (1)	747	7–5	—
March 6	ACCNX	at No. 5 Georgia Tech		Russ Chandler Stadium; Atlanta, GA	**L** 1–16^{7}	Ballard (2–0)	**Grim** (0–2)	None	2,521	7–6	0–1
March 7	ACCNX	at No. 5 Georgia Tech		Russ Chandler Stadium	**L** 5–14	Gaudette (1–0)	**Swift** (1–1)	None	3,341	7–7	0–2
March 8	ACCNX	at No. 5 Georgia Tech		Russ Chandler Stadium	**W** 9–6	**Craytor** (2–0)	Buursemma (0–1)	**Crowl** (1)	2,010	8–7	1–2
Commonwealth Clash
March 13	ACCNX	at No. 14 Virginia		Davenport Field; Charlottesville, VA	**L** 6–11	Zatkowski (3–0)	**Yagesh** (1–1)	None	4,078	8–8	1–3
March 14	ACCNX	at No. 14 Virginia		Davenport Field	**L** 5-10	Stammel (2-0)	**Renfrow** (0-3)	None	4,519	8-9	1-4
March 15	ACCNX	at No. 14 Virginia		Davenport Field	**W** 6–3	**Stieg** (1–1)	Paone (1–1)	**Crowl** (2)	4,111	9–9	2–4
March 18	ACCNX	VCU*		E.R. English Field	**W** 11–8	**Roe** (2–0)	Nystrom (0–1)	**Crowl** (3)	633	10–9	—
March 20	ACCNX	Duke		E.R. English Field	**W** 7–1	Yagesh (2–1)	Weaver (4–2)	None	581	11–9	3–4
March 21	ACCNX	Duke		E.R. English Field	**L** 6–8	Dean (4–0)	**Crowl** (1–1)	None	1,063	11–10	3–5
March 22	ACCNX	Duke		E.R. English Field	**W** 7–6	**Craytor** (3–0)	O'Connell (0–1)	None	984	12–10	4–5
March 24	ESPN+	at ETSU*		Thomas Stadium; Johnson City, TN	**L** 4–9	Scott (2–0)	**Exum** (0–1)	Grass (1)	1,092	12–11	—
March 27	ACCNX	Stanford		E.R. English Field	**L** 7–9	O'Harran (2–1)	**Eisenreich** (0–1)	Moore (1)	251	12–12	4–6
March 28	ACCNX	Stanford		E.R. English Field	**W** 10–2	**Renfrow** (1–3)	Garewal (0–1)	None	881	13–12	5–6
March 29	ACCNX	Stanford		E.R. English Field	**L** 3–6	Moore (4–1)	**Crowl** (1–2)	None	741	13–13	5–7
New River Valley Series
March 31	ESPN+	at Radford*		Carter Memorial Stadium; Radford, VA	**W** 13–5	**Exum** (1–1)	Noonan (1–1)	None	438	14–13	—

April: 9–7 (Home: 6–3; Away: 3–4; Neutral: 0–0)
Date	TV	Opponent	Rank	Stadium	Score	Win	Loss	Save	Attendance	Overall	ACC
April 3	ACCNX	at No. 25 Miami (FL)		Alex Rodriguez Park; Coral Gables, FL	**L** 1–19^{7}	Evans (6–1)	**Yagesh** (2–2)	None	3,009	14–14	5–8
April 4	ACCNX	at No. 25 Miami (FL)		Alex Rodriguez Park	**L** 6–8	Bouchard (5–2)	**Spiegel** (0–1)	None	2,952	14–15	5–9
April 5	ACCNX	at No. 25 Miami (FL)		Alex Rodriguez Park	**W** 6–3	**Velasquez** (2–2)	Fitzpatrick (1–3)	None	209	15–15	6–9
April 7	ACCNX	Liberty		E.R. English Field	**L** 4–11	Evans (1–0)	**Roe** (2–1)	None	749	15–16	—
April 10	ACCNX	at No. 23 Boston College		Eddie Pellagrini Diamond; Brighton, MA	**W** 9–8	**Roe** (3–1)	Kipp (0–3)	None	750	16–16	7–9
April 11	ACCN	at No. 23 Boston College		Fenway Park; Boston, MA	**L** 7–8	Kwiatkowski (4–0)	**Grimm** (0–3)	Soares (3)	3,213	16–17	7–10
April 12	ACCNX	at No. 23 Boston College		Eddie Pellagrini Diamond	**L** 2–6	Mudd (4–0)	**Stieg** (2–2)	None	1,863	16–18	7–11
New River Valley Series
April 14	ACCNX	Radford*		E.R. English Field	**W** 14–0^{7}	**Grim** (1–3)	Milleville (1–1)	None	1,034	17–18	—
April 17	ACCNX	Pitt		E.R. English Field	**W** 11–6	**Renfrow** (4–2)	Doganiero (5–2)	**Craytor** (2)	1,192	18–18	8–11
April 18	ACCNX	Pitt		E.R. English Field	**L** 4–5	Smink (3–0)	**Eisenreich** (0–2)	None	1,327	18–19	8–12
April 19	ACCNX	Pitt		E.R. English Field	**W** 6–5	**Craytor** (4–0)	Luczak (1–1)	None	561	19–19	9–12
April 21	ESPN+	at VCU*		The Diamond; Richmond, VA	**W** 8–6	**Robertson** (1–0)	Clover (0–3)	**Roe** (1)	384	20–19	—
April 24	ACCNX	NC State		E.R. English Field	**W** 4–0	**Renfrow** (3–4)	Andrews (3–3)	None	765	21–19	10–12
April 25	ACCNX	NC State		E.R. English Field	**L** 7–14	Garino (3–2)	**Grim** (1–4)	None	747	21–20	10–13
April 26	ACCNX	NC State		E.R. English Field	**W** 5–4	**Crowl** (2–2)	Harris (1–1)	**Swift** (1)	813	22–20	11–13
April 28	ACCNX	James Madison*		E.R. English Field	**W** 14–1^{7}	**Roe** (4–1)	Horvath (2–1)	None	994	23–20	—

May: 6–3 (Home: 3–2; Away: 3–1; Neutral: 0–0)
Date	TV	Opponent	Rank	Stadium	Score	Win	Loss	Save	Attendance	Overall	ACC
May 1	ACCNX	at California		Evans Diamond; Berkeley, CA	**W** 9–1	**Renfrow** (4–4)	de la Torre (4–5)	None	397	24–20	12–13
May 2	ACCNX	at California		Evans Diamond	**W** 6–2	**Eisenreich** (1–2)	Eddy (6–3)	**Crowl** (4)	538	25–20	13–13
May 3	ACCNX	at California		Evans Diamond	**L** 4–9	Foley (4–3)	**Stieg** (2–3)	None	537	25–21	13–14
May 6	ESPN+	at Liberty*		Worthington Field; Lynchburg, VA	**W** 8-4	**Grim** (2-4)	Dahlman (0-1)	None	1,452	26-21	—
May 9	ACCNX	UNCG*		E.R. English Field	**L** 13-18	Dear (2-2)	**Yagesh** (2-3)	Horton (5)	1,027	26-22	—
May 10	ACCNX	UNCG*		E.R. English Field	**W** 11-9	**Grim** (3-4)	Shuey (2-6)	**Swift** (2)	1,021	27-22	—
May 12	ESPN+	at Marshall*		Jack Cook Field; Huntington, WV	**Canceled**						
May 14	ACCNX	Clemson		E.R. English Field	**W** 5-1	**Renfrow** (5-4)	Moehler (0-3)	None	476	28-22	14-14
May 15	ACCNX	Clemson		E.R. English Field	**W** 2-1	**Grim** (4-4)	Simmerson (1-2)	None	738	29-22	15-14
May 16	ACCNX	Clemson		E.R. English Field	**L** 8-10	LeGuernic (4-2)	**Stieg** (2-4)	Miller (1)	1,022	29-23	15-15

Postseason: 1–3 (Home: 0–0; Away: 0–1; Neutral: 1–2)

ACC tournament: 1–1 (Home: 0–0; Away: 0–0; Neutral: 1–1)
Date	TV	Opponent	Rank	Stadium	Score	Win	Loss	Save	Attendance	Overall	ACCT Record
May 20	ACCN	vs. (10) Notre Dame	(7)	Truist Field; Charlotte, NC	**W** 17–10	**Eisenreich** (2–2)	Uber (4–3)	None	3,913	30–23	1–0
May 16	ACCNX	vs. (2) North Carolina	(7)	Truist Field	**L** 4–10	Glauber (9–0)	**Stieg** (2–5)	None		30–24	1–1

Los Angeles Regional: 0–2 (Home: 0–0; Away: 0–1; Neutral: 0–1)
Date	TV	Opponent	Rank	Stadium	Score	Win	Loss	Save	Attendance	Overall	Regional Record
May 29	ESPN+	vs. (3) Cal Poly	(2)	Jackie Robinson Stadium; Los Angeles, CA	**L** 2–6	Naess (8–4)	**Eisenreich** (2–3)	Bonn (1)	1,680	30–25	0–1
May 30	ESPNU	vs. (1) No. 1 UCLA	(2)	Jackie Robinson Stadium	**L** 5–6	Hawk (7–3)	**Grim** (4–5)	None	1,680	30–26	0–2

Legend: = Win = Loss = Canceled
Bold = Virginia Tech team member
Rankings are based on the team's current ranking in the D1Baseball poll.

Schedule Notes

== Rankings ==
Ranking movements Legend: ██ Increase in ranking ██ Decrease in ranking — = Not ranked RV = Received votes
	Week																	
Poll	Pre	1	2	3	4	5	6	7	8	9	10	11	12	13	14	15	16	Final
Coaches'	—	—*	—	—	—	—	—	—	—	—	—	—	—	—	—	—	—*	
Baseball America	—	—	—	—	—	—	—	—	—	—	—	—	—	—	—	—*	—*	
NCBWA†	—	—	—	—	—	—	—	—	—	—	—	—	—	RV	—	—*	—	
D1Baseball	—	—	—	—	—	—	—	—	—	—	—	—	—	—	—	—	—*	
Perfect Game	—	—	—	—	—	—	—	—	—	—	—	—	—	—	—	—*	—*	

† NCBWA ranks 30 teams in their preseason poll, but only ranks 25 teams weekly during the season.
* A new poll was not released for this week, so for comparison purposes, the previous week's ranking is inserted in this week's slot.
