= 2026 Louisville Cardinals baseball team =

American college baseball season

2026 Louisville Cardinals baseball
- Conference: Atlantic Coast Conference
- Record: 30–27 (13–17 ACC)
- Head coach: Dan McDonnell (20th season)
- Assistant coaches: Roger Williams (20th season); Eric Snider (12th season); Adam Vrable (12th season)
- Home stadium: Jim Patterson Stadium

2026 Atlantic Coast Conference baseball standings
	Conf.						Overall
Team	W		L		T	PCT	W		L		T	PCT
No. 2 Georgia Tech ‍†‍‡‍^{y}	25	–	5	–	0	.833	45	–	9	–	0	.833
No. 4 North Carolina ‍‍‍^{y}	22	–	8	–	0	.733	43	–	10	–	1	.806
No. 12 Florida State ‍‍‍^{y}	19	–	11	–	0	.633	38	–	16	–	0	.704
Boston College ‍‍‍^{y}	17	–	13	–	0	.567	36	–	20	–	0	.643
Wake Forest ‍‍‍^{y}	16	–	14	–	0	.533	38	–	18	–	0	.679
Miami (FL) ‍‍‍^{y}	16	–	14	–	0	.533	36	–	17	–	0	.679
Virginia Tech ‍‍‍^{y}	15	–	15	–	0	.500	29	–	23	–	0	.558
Virginia ‍‍‍^{y}	14	–	16	–	0	.467	36	–	20	–	0	.643
NC State ‍‍‍^{y}	14	–	16	–	0	.467	32	–	21	–	0	.604
Louisville ‍‍‍	13	–	17	–	0	.433	30	–	26	–	0	.536
Notre Dame ‍‍‍	13	–	17	–	0	.433	30	–	21	–	0	.588
Stanford ‍‍‍	13	–	17	–	0	.433	28	–	25	–	0	.528
California ‍‍‍	12	–	18	–	0	.400	29	–	26	–	0	.527
Pittsburgh ‍‍‍	11	–	19	–	0	.367	30	–	23	–	0	.566
Clemson ‍‍‍	10	–	20	–	0	.333	31	–	25	–	0	.554
Duke ‍‍‍	10	–	20	–	0	.333	25	–	31	–	0	.446
† – Conference champion ‡ – Tournament champion y – Invited to the NCAA Tournament; As of May 17, 2026; Rankings from D1Baseball

The 2026 Louisville Cardinals baseball team represents the University of Louisville during the 2026 NCAA Division I baseball season. The Cardinals play their home games at Jim Patterson Stadium as a member of the Atlantic Coast Conference. They are led by head coach Dan McDonnell, in his 20th year at Louisville.

Sophomore Tague Davis set the school record for single-season home runs with his 26th against Clemson. Against Miami, Davis tied and then broke the ACC single-season home run record with his 31st and 32nd of the season, breaking the record in just 51 games vs the previous record of 61 games.

== Previous season ==
The 2025 Louisville Cardinals baseball team finished the season 40–22 with a 15–15 conference record. For the first time since 2022, Louisville received a bid to play in the NCAA Tournament. The Cardinals received the 2 seed in the Nashville Regional hosted by the No. 1 overall seed Vanderbilt Commodores. Louisville swept the regional and advanced to host the Louisville Super Regional against the Miami Hurricanes. Louisville won the series 2–1 and advanced to the 2025 Men's College World Series for the programs sixth appearance and first since 2019. Louisville advanced to the national semifinals where they lost to Coastal Carolina.

== 2025 MLB Draft ==
The Cardinals had six players drafted in the 2025 MLB draft for its most since the 2021 MLB draft.

Player	Position	Round	Overall	MLB Team
Patrick Forbes	Pitcher	1	29	Arizona Diamondbacks
Jake Munroe	Third baseman	4	109	Los Angeles Angels
Peter Kussow	Pitcher	4	133	New York Mets
Matt Klein	Catcher	6	167	Colorado Rockies
Tucker Biven	Pitcher	13	381	Washington Nationals
Eddie King Jr.	Outfielder	16	473	Pittsburgh Pirates
Justin West	Pitcher	18	554	New York Yankees

== Schedule and results ==
2026 Louisville Cardinals baseball game log (27–24)
Regular season (27–24)

February (6–4)

Date	Time (ET)	TV	Opponent	Rank	Stadium	Score	Win	Loss	Save	Attendance	Overall	ACC
February 13	3:00 p.m.	ACCNX	Michigan State*	No. 8	Jim Patterson Stadium; Louisville, KY	**L** 3–4	Higgins (1–0)	**Murphy** (0–1)	Szczepanski (1)	1,744	0–1	–
February 14	1:00 p.m.	ACCNX	Michigan State*	No. 8	Jim Patterson Stadium; Louisville, KY	**L** 4–13	Chambers (1–0)	**Bean** (0–1)	None	1,494	0–2	–
February 15	1:00 p.m.	ACCNX	Michigan State*	No. 8	Jim Patterson Stadium; Louisville, KY	**W** 9–1	**Danilowicz** (1–0)	Pikur (0–1)	None	546	1–2	–
February 17	3:00 p.m.	ACCNX	Xavier*	No. 15	Jim Patterson Stadium; Louisville, KY	**W** 23–11	**Starke** (1–0)	Chronister (0–1)	**Hartman** (1)	932	2–2	–
Amegy Bank College Baseball Series
February 20	4:00 p.m.	FloSports	vs. Nebraska*	No. 15	Globe Life Field; Arlington, TX	**W** 4–2	**Brown** (1–0)	Clark (1–1)	**England** (1)		3–2	–
February 21	12:00 p.m.	FloSports	vs. Michigan*	No. 15	Globe Life Field; Arlington, TX	**L** 5–8	Montgomery (2–0)	**Bean** (0–2)	DeVooght (3)		3–3	–
February 22	11:30 a.m.	FloSports	vs. No. 9 Auburn*	No. 15	Globe Life Field; Arlington, TX	**L** 6–10	Petrovic (2–0)	**Danilowicz** (1–1)	Brewer (2)		3–4	–
February 25	2:30 p.m.	ACCNX	Eastern Kentucky*		Jim Patterson Stadium; Louisville, KY	**W** 6–5	**Schweitzer** (1–0)	Briese (0–1)	**England** (2)	575	4–4	–
February 27	3:00 p.m.	ACCNX	Central Michigan*		Jim Patterson Stadium; Louisville, KY	**W** 16–2^{(7)}	**Eberle** (1–0)	Bailey (0–2)	None	1,547	5–4	–
February 28	1:00 p.m.	ACCNX	Central Michigan*		Jim Patterson Stadium; Louisville, KY	**W** 9–8	**Shannon** (1–0)	Potts (0–1)	None	2,132	6–4	–

March (12–7)

Date	Time (ET)	TV	Opponent	Rank	Stadium	Score	Win	Loss	Save	Attendance	Overall	ACC
March 1	1:00 p.m.	ACCNX	Central Michigan*		Jim Patterson Stadium; Louisville, KY	**W** 7–5	**Brown** (2–0)	Campau (0–1)	**England** (3)	815	7–4	–
March 3	3:00 p.m.	ACCNX	Morehead State*		Jim Patterson Stadium; Louisville, KY	**L** 5–13	Owens (2–0)	**Hartman** (0–1)	None	413	7–5	–
March 6	3:00 p.m.	ACCNX	Seton Hall*		Jim Patterson Stadium; Louisville, KY	**W** 16–1^{(7)}	**Eberle** (2–0)	Svenson (0–1)	None	1,357	8–5	–
March 7	1:00 p.m.	ACCNX	Seton Hall*		Jim Patterson Stadium; Louisville, KY	**W** 13–3^{(8)}	**Danilowicz** (2–1)	Barroqueiro (0–3)	None	406	9–5	–
March 8	1:00 p.m.	ACCNX	Seton Hall*		Jim Patterson Stadium; Louisville, KY	**W** 6–2	**Bean** (1–2)	Christopher (1–1)	None	1,205	10–5	–
March 10	3:00 p.m.	ACCNX	Marshall*		Jim Patterson Stadium; Louisville, KY	**W** 16–5^{(7)}	**Ballard** (1–0)	Jackson (0–2)	None	717	11–5	–
March 11	11:00 a.m.	ACCNX	Marshall*		Jim Patterson Stadium; Louisville, KY	**W** 18–8^{(7)}	**Hartman** (1–1)	Albright (1–2)	None	412	12–5	–
March 13	6:00 p.m.	ACCNX	Notre Dame		Jim Patterson Stadium; Louisville, KY	**L** 11–14	Jaisle (1–0)	**Shannon** (1–1)	None	2,788	12–6	0–1
March 14	6:00 p.m.	ACCNX	Notre Dame		Jim Patterson Stadium; Louisville, KY	**W** 8–7	**England** (1–0)	Hirsch (2–1)	None	2,899	13–6	1–1
March 15	1:00 p.m.	ACCNX	Notre Dame		Jim Patterson Stadium; Louisville, KY	**W** 21–12	**Vorster** (1–0)	Thurmond (0–1)	None	2,920	14–6	2–1
March 18	4:00 p.m.	ACCNX	Northern Kentucky*		Jim Patterson Stadium; Louisville, KY	**W** 16–1^{(7)}	**Hartman** (2–1)	Parnell (0–1)	None	417	15–6	–
March 20	8:00 p.m.	ACCN	at No. 14 North Carolina		Boshamer Stadium; Chapel Hill, NC	**L** 1–11^{(8)}	DeCaro (5–1)	**Eberle** (2–1)	None	2,699	15–7	2–2
March 21	2:00 p.m.	ACCNX	at No. 14 North Carolina		Boshamer Stadium; Chapel Hill, NC	**W** 2–0	**Danilowicz** (3–1)	Lynch (2–2)	**England** (4)	3,376	16–7	3–2
March 22	1:00 p.m.	ACCNX	at No. 14 North Carolina		Boshamer Stadium; Chapel Hill, NC	**L** 6–7	Glauber (2–0)	**Karbowski** (0–1)	Matthijs (2)	3,231	16–8	3–3
March 24	7:00 p.m.	ESPN+	at Western Kentucky*		Nick Denes Field; Bowling Green, KY	**L** 5–10	Samuels (1–0)	**Brown** (2–1)	None	1,694	16–9	–
March 27	6:00 p.m.	ACCNX	Pittsburgh		Jim Patterson Stadium; Louisville, KY	**L** 3–4	Gray (3–0)	**England** (1–1)	None	2,769	16–10	3–4
March 28	2:00 p.m.	ACCNX	Pittsburgh		Jim Patterson Stadium; Louisville, KY	**W** 8–5	**Hartman** (3–1)	Spizzoucco (2–1)	**Bean** (1)	2,827	17–10	4–4
March 29	1:00 p.m.	ACCNX	Pittsburgh		Jim Patterson Stadium; Louisville, KY	**L** 7–13	Lafferty (4–2)	**Shannon** (1–2)	Smink (2)	3,000	17–11	4–5
March 31	1:00 p.m.		vs. Eastern Kentucky*		Legends Field; Lexington, KY	**W** 17–7^{(7)}	**Schlageter** (1–0)	Stockham (0–4)	None	102	18–11	—

April (8–9)

Date	Time (ET)	TV	Opponent	Rank	Stadium	Score	Win	Loss	Save	Attendance	Overall	ACC
April 2	8:00 p.m.	ACCN	at Duke		Jack Coombs Field; Durham, NC	**L** 3–6	Lemke (1–2)	**Eberle** (2–2)	Hedrick (1)	595	18–12	4–6
April 3	6:00 p.m.	ACCN	at Duke		Jack Coombs Field; Durham, NC	**L** 8–10	Dean (5–0)	**Michael** (0–1)	None	913	18–13	4–7
April 4	12:00 p.m.	ACCNX	at Duke		Jack Coombs Field; Durham, NC	**W** 9–4	**Brown** (3–1)	Leon (2–2)	None	1,096	19–13	5–7
April 7	5:30 p.m.	SECN	at Kentucky*		Kentucky Proud Park; Lexington, KY	**L** 2–4	Boone (2–0)	**Brown** (3–2)	Bennett (6)	3,694	19–14	—
April 10	6:00 p.m.	ACCNX	Stanford		Jim Patterson Stadium; Louisville, KY	**L** 2–12	Peterson (2–1)	**Danilowicz** (3–2)	None	3,489	19–15	5–8
April 11	2:00 p.m.	ACCNX	Stanford		Jim Patterson Stadium; Louisville, KY	**W** 10–0^{(7)}	**Eberle** (3–2)	Garewal (0–2)	None	3,043	20–15	6–8
April 12	1:00 p.m.	ACCN	Stanford		Jim Patterson Stadium; Louisville, KY	**L** 4–6	Moore (6–1)	**England** (1–2)	None	2,902	20–16	6–9
April 14	6:00 p.m.	ACCNX	Western Kentucky*		Jim Patterson Stadium; Louisville, KY	**W** 7–3	**Bean** (2–2)	Lyles (1–1)	None	923	21–16	—
April 17	9:00 p.m.	ACCNX	at California		Evans Diamond; Berkeley, CA	**L** 5–8	De La Torre (3–4)	**Schweitzer** (1–1)	Foley (1)	888	21–17	6–10
April 18	5:00 p.m.	ACCNX	at California		Evans Diamond; Berkeley, CA	**L** 5–6	Eddy (6–2)	**Eberle** (3–3)	Foley (2)	476	21–18	6–11
April 19	4:00 p.m.	ACCNX	at California		Evans Diamond; Berkeley, CA	**W 8–5**	**Shannon** (2–2)	Mackowiak (0–1)	**Starke** (1)	858	22–18	7–11
April 21	7:00 p.m.	ACCN	Kentucky*		Jim Patterson Stadium; Louisville, KY	**W** 14–10	**England** (2–2)	Bennett (1–3)	**Michael** (1)	4,444	23–18	—
April 24	6:00 p.m.	ACCNX	Clemson		Jim Patterson Stadium; Louisville, KY	**W** 13–10	**Danilowicz** (4–2)	Knaak (2–5)	None	3,084	24–18	8–11
April 25	7:00 p.m.	ACCN	Clemson		Jim Patterson Stadium; Louisville, KY	**W** 11–6	**Brown** (4–2)	Simmerson (0–1)	None	3,214	25–18	9–11
April 26	2:00 p.m.	ACCN	Clemson		Jim Patterson Stadium; Louisville, KY	**W** 7–5^{(10)}	**Hoyt** (1–0)	Leguernic (3–2)	None	2,940	26–18	10–11
April 28	6:00 p.m.	ACCNX	Indiana*		Jim Patterson Stadium; Louisville, KY	**L** 6–10	Linn (4–0)	**Bean** (2–3)	None	2,861	26–19	—
April 30	7:00 p.m.	ACCN	at Wake Forest		David F. Couch Ballpark; Winston-Salem, NC	**L** 8–9^{(10)}	Ray (2–0)	**Michael** (0–2)	None	2,693	26–20	10–12

May (1–4)

Date	Time (ET)	TV	Opponent	Rank	Stadium	Score	Win	Loss	Save	Attendance	Overall	ACC
May 1	6:00 p.m.	ACCNX	at Wake Forest		David F. Couch Ballpark; Winston-Salem, NC	**L** 5–6	Harsch (2–2)	**Shannon** (2–3)	None	2,428	26–21	10–13
May 2	1:00 p.m.	ACCNX	at Wake Forest		David F. Couch Ballpark; Winston-Salem, NC	**L** 5–7	Johnston (1–0)	**Murphy** (0–2)	Bowie (1)	2,386	26–22	10–14
May 5	6:00 p.m.	ESPN2	at Vanderbilt*		Hawkins Field; Nashville, TN	**L** 6–12	Shorey (1–0)	**Hartman** (3–2)		3,100	26–23	10–14
May 7	7:00 p.m.	ACCNX	at Miami		Alex Rodriguez Park at Mark Light Field; Coral Gables, FL	**L** 8–13	Evans (9–3)	**Starke** (1–1)		3,064	26–24	10–15
May 8	7:00 p.m.	ACCNX	at Miami		Alex Rodriguez Park at Mark Light Field; Coral Gables, FL	**W** 16–9	**England** (3–2)	Bilka (2–1)		2,715	27–24	11–15
May 9	2:00 p.m.	ACCNX	at Miami		Alex Rodriguez Park at Mark Light Field; Coral Gables, FL						–	–
May 12	6:00 p.m.	ACCNX	Bellarmine*		Jim Patterson Stadium; Louisville, KY						–	—
May 14	6:00 p.m.	ACCNX	Virginia		Jim Patterson Stadium; Louisville, KY						–	–
May 15	6:00 p.m.	ACCNX	Virginia		Jim Patterson Stadium; Louisville, KY						–	–
May 16	1:00 p.m.	ACCNX	Virginia		Jim Patterson Stadium; Louisville, KY						–	–

Legend: = Win = Loss = Canceled
Bold = Louisville team member * Non-conference game

== Rankings ==
Ranking movements Legend: ██ Increase in ranking ██ Decrease in ranking — = Not ranked RV = Received votes
	Week																
Poll	Pre	1	2	3	4	5	6	7	8	9	10	11	12	13	14	15	Final
Coaches'	11	11*	RV	RV	RV	RV	RV	RV	—	—	—	—	—				
Baseball America	18	—	—	—	—	—	—	—	—	—	—	—	—				
NCBWA†	10	21	RV	RV	RV	RV	RV	RV	RV	—	—	—	—				
D1Baseball	8	15	—	—	—	—	—	—	—	—	—	—	—				
Perfect Game	16	23	—	—	—	—	—	—	—	—	—	—	—				

† NCBWA ranks 30 teams in their preseason poll, but only ranks 25 teams weekly during the season.
* A new poll was not released for this week, so for comparison purposes, the previous week's ranking is inserted in this week's slot.
