= 2026 California Golden Bears baseball team =

American college baseball season

2026 California Golden Bears baseball
- Conference: Atlantic Coast Conference
- Record: 29–26 (12–18 ACC)
- Head coach: Mike Neu (9th season)
- Assistant coaches: Chris Bodishbaugh (4th season); Chad Highberger (6th season)
- Hitting coach: Brett Wallace
- Home stadium: Evans Diamond

2026 Atlantic Coast Conference baseball standings
	Conf.						Overall
Team	W		L		T	PCT	W		L		T	PCT
No. 3 Georgia Tech ‍†‍‍	25	–	5	–	0	.833	45	–	9	–	0	.833
No. 2 North Carolina ‍‍‍	22	–	8	–	0	.733	43	–	10	–	1	.806
No. 11 Florida State ‍‍‍	19	–	11	–	0	.633	38	–	16	–	0	.704
Boston College ‍‍‍	17	–	13	–	0	.567	36	–	20	–	0	.643
Wake Forest ‍‍‍	16	–	14	–	0	.533	38	–	18	–	0	.679
Miami (FL) ‍‍‍	16	–	14	–	0	.533	36	–	17	–	0	.679
Virginia Tech ‍‍‍	15	–	15	–	0	.500	29	–	23	–	0	.558
Virginia ‍‍‍	14	–	16	–	0	.467	35	–	20	–	0	.636
NC State ‍‍‍	14	–	16	–	0	.467	32	–	21	–	0	.604
Louisville ‍‍‍	13	–	17	–	0	.433	30	–	26	–	0	.536
Notre Dame ‍‍‍	13	–	17	–	0	.433	30	–	21	–	0	.588
Stanford ‍‍‍	13	–	17	–	0	.433	28	–	25	–	0	.528
California ‍‍‍	12	–	18	–	0	.400	29	–	26	–	0	.527
Pittsburgh ‍‍‍	11	–	19	–	0	.367	30	–	23	–	0	.566
Clemson ‍‍‍	10	–	20	–	0	.333	31	–	25	–	0	.554
Duke ‍‍‍	10	–	20	–	0	.333	25	–	30	–	0	.455
† – Conference champion ‡ – Tournament champion y – Invited to the NCAA Tournament; As of May 17, 2026; Rankings from D1Baseball

The 2026 California Golden Bears baseball team represents the University of California, Berkeley in the 2026 NCAA Division I baseball season. The Golden Bears play their home games at Evans Diamond. This will be their second season as a member of the Atlantic Coast Conference (ACC) and will be led by Mike Neu in his 9th season at Cal.

== Previous season ==
The 2025 California Golden Bears baseball team posted a 24–31 (9–21) season record, good for last place in the ACC. As a 16th seed in the ACC Tournament, they would beat 9th seed Miami (FL) in 8th inning in the First Round, 8th seed Wake Forest in the Second Round, but would lose to top (1st) seed Georgia Tech in the Quarterfinals ending their season after they didn't get an invite to the NCAA Tournament.

== Preseason ==
=== Coaches poll ===
ACC coaches poll
Predicted finish	Team	Votes (1st place)
1	Georgia Tech	237 (7)
2	North Carolina	236 (6)
3	Florida State	221 (1)
4	Louisville	196
5	Clemson	185 (2)
6	NC State	169
7	Virginia	165
8	Miami	159
9	Wake Forest	145
10	Stanford	99
11	Virginia Tech	89
12	Notre Dame	87
13	Duke	67
14	Pittsburgh	45
15	California	41
16	Boston College	35

== Roster ==
2026 California Golden Bears roster
Pitchers	Catchers Infielders	Outfielders	Two Way Players

=== Coaches ===
2026 California Golden Bears baseball coaching staff
- Mike Neu – Head coach – 9th season
- Chris Bodishbaugh – Pitching/Assistant coach – 4th season
- Brett Wallace – Hitting/Assistant coach – 2nd season
- Anthony Gilich – Assistant coach – 1st season

Note: Season counter accounts for all stints at California.

== Personnel ==
=== Starters ===
Opening Night Lineup
Pos.	No.	Player.	Year
--			
--			
--			
--			
--			
--			
--			
--			
--			

Weekend pitching rotation
Day	No.	Player.	Year
Friday			
Saturday			
Sunday			

== Offseason ==
=== 2025 MLB draft ===
2025 MLB draft class
Round	Pick	Overall pick	Player	Position	MLB team

== Schedule and results ==
2026 California Golden Bears baseball game log (Overall: 13–6; Conference: 0–2); (Home: 9–2; Away: 4–4)
Regular season (13–6)
February (7–3)
(Home; 3–1; Away: 4–2)

Date Time	Opponent	Rank	TV	Venue	Score	Win	Loss	Save	Attendance	Overall record	ACC record
February 13	Santa Clara*		ACCNX	Evans Diamond; Berkeley, CA	2–13	Bayles	**de la Torre**	—	648	0–1	–
February 14	Santa Clara*		ACCNX	Evans Diamond	5–4	**Clark**	Lanz	—	728	1–1	–
February 14	Santa Clara*		ACCNX	Evans Diamond	4–3	**Lopez**	Schreiber	—	728	2–1	–
February 16	at Santa Clara*		ESPN+	Stephen Schott Stadium; Santa Clara, CA	4–10	Chow	**Russell**	—	480	2–2	–
February 20	at UC Irvine*		ESPN+	Anteater Ballpark; Irvine, CA	3–5	Hansen	**de la Torre**	Rodgers	1,031	2–3	–
February 21	at UC Irvine*		ESPN+	Anteater Ballpark	11–2	**Foley**	Ojeda	**Espinoza**	984	3–3	–
February 22	at UC Irvine*		ESPN+	Anteater Ballpark	4–2	**Eddy**	Castles	**Kreis**	894	4–3	–
February 24	UC Davis*		ACCNX	Evans Diamond	Cancelled due to inclement weather					4–3	–
February 25	at UC Davis*		ESPN+	Dobbins Stadium; Davis, CA	7–2	**Grove**	Speights	—	512	5–3	–
February 27	Sacramento State*		ACCNX	Evans Diamond	5–4	**Clark**	Marton	—	592	6–3	–
February 28	at Sacramento State*		WAC International	John Smith Field; Sacramento, CA	8–2	**Foley**	Wilson	**Otto**	591	7–3	–

March (6–3)
(Home; 6–1; Away: 0–2)

Date Time	Opponent	Rank	TV	Venue	Score	Win	Loss	Save	Attendance	Overall record	ACC record
March 1	Sacramento State*		ACCNX	Evans Diamond	3–2	**Eddy**	Timothy	**Clark**	601	8–3	–
March 4	Cal State Bakersfield*		ACCNX	Evans Diamond	15–6	**Roach**	Myers		280	9–3	–
March 6	San Diego*		ACCNX	Evans Diamond	11–1	**de la Torre**	Gutierrez		388	10–3	–
March 7	San Diego*		ACCNX	Evans Diamond	15–9	**Kreis**	Piper		524	11–3	–
March 7	San Diego*		ACCNX	Evans Diamond	9–1	**Otto**	Palencia		524	12–3	–
March 8	San Diego*		ACCNX	Evans Diamond	5–2	**Eddy**	Deschryver	**Colombara**	524	13–3	–
March 10	at San Jose State*		Mountain West Network	Excite Ballpark; San Jose, CA	2–3	Duke	**Kreis**		388	13–4	–
March 13	No. 15 North Carolina		ACCNX	Evans Diamond	1–8	DeCaro	**de la Torre**	Glauber	605	13–5	0–1
March 14	No. 15 North Carolina		ACCNX	Evans Diamond	2–6	Lynch	**Foley**		672	13–6	0–2
March 15	No. 15 North Carolina		ACCNX	Evans Diamond	2–10	McDuffie	**Eddy**		674	13–7	0–3
March 17	UConn*		ACCNX	Evans Diamond						–	–
March 20	at Boston College			Pellagrini Diamond; Boston, MA						–	–
March 21	at Boston College			Pellagrini Diamond						–	–
March 22	at Boston College			Pellagrini Diamond						–	–
March 27	at Wake Forest			David F. Couch Ballpark; Winston-Salem, NC						–	–
March 28	at Wake Forest			David F. Couch Ballpark						–	–
March 29	at Wake Forest			David F. Couch Ballpark						–	–
March 31	Saint Mary's*		ACCNX	Evans Diamond						–	–

April (0–0)
(Home; 0–0; Away: 0–0)

Date Time	Opponent	Rank	TV	Venue	Score	Win	Loss	Save	Attendance	Overall record	ACC record

May (0–0)
(Home; 0–0; Away: 0–0)

Date Time	Opponent	Rank	TV	Venue	Score	Win	Loss	Save	Attendance	Overall record	ACC record

Postseason (0-0)
ACC Tournament (0-0)

Date Time	Opponent	Rank	TV	Venue	Score	Win	Loss	Save	Attendance	Overall record	Tournament record

"#" represents ranking. All rankings from D1 Baseball Poll on the date of the contest.
"()" represents postseason seeding in the ACC Tournament or NCAA Regional, respectively.
= Win, = Loss, = Canceled/Postponed
Bold = **California Golden Bears team member**
* = Non-Conference Game
Schedule Source:

== Rankings ==
Ranking movements Legend: ██ Increase in ranking ██ Decrease in ranking — = Not ranked RV = Received votes
	Week																
Poll	Pre	1	2	3	4	5	6	7	8	9	10	11	12	13	14	15	Final
Coaches'	—	—*	—	—	RV	—											
Baseball America	—	—	—	—	—	—											
NCBWA†	—	—	—	—	RV	—											
D1Baseball	—	—	—	—	—	—											
Perfect Game	—	—	—	—	—	—											

† NCBWA ranks 30 teams in their preseason poll, but only ranks 25 teams weekly during the season.
* A new poll was not released for this week, so for comparison purposes, the previous week's ranking is inserted in this week's slot.
