= 2026 Georgia Tech Yellow Jackets baseball team =

American college baseball season

2026 Georgia Tech Yellow Jackets baseball

ACC regular season and tournament champions

Atlanta Regional, 2–2
- Conference: Atlantic Coast Conference

Ranking
- Coaches: No. 11
- D1Baseball.com: No. 10
- Record: 50–11 (25–5 ACC)
- Head coach: James Ramsey (1st season)
- Home stadium: Russ Chandler Stadium

2026 Atlantic Coast Conference baseball standings
	Conf.						Overall
Team	W		L		T	PCT	W		L		T	PCT
No. 10 Georgia Tech ‍†‍‡‍^{y}	25	–	5	–	0	.833	50	–	11	–	0	.820
No. 2 North Carolina ‍‍‍^{y}	22	–	8	–	0	.733	54	–	14	–	1	.790
No. 18 Florida State ‍‍‍^{y}	19	–	11	–	0	.633	40	–	19	–	0	.678
Boston College ‍‍‍^{y}	17	–	13	–	0	.567	40	–	24	–	0	.625
Wake Forest ‍‍‍^{y}	16	–	14	–	0	.533	39	–	21	–	0	.650
Miami (FL) ‍‍‍^{y}	16	–	14	–	0	.533	39	–	20	–	0	.661
Virginia Tech ‍‍‍^{y}	15	–	15	–	0	.500	30	–	26	–	0	.536
Virginia ‍‍‍^{y}	14	–	16	–	0	.467	37	–	23	–	0	.617
NC State ‍‍‍^{y}	14	–	16	–	0	.467	32	–	24	–	0	.571
Louisville ‍‍‍	13	–	17	–	0	.433	30	–	27	–	0	.526
Notre Dame ‍‍‍	13	–	17	–	0	.433	31	–	22	–	0	.585
Stanford ‍‍‍	13	–	17	–	0	.433	28	–	26	–	0	.519
California ‍‍‍	12	–	18	–	0	.400	29	–	26	–	0	.527
Pittsburgh ‍‍‍	11	–	19	–	0	.367	33	–	24	–	0	.579
Clemson ‍‍‍	10	–	20	–	0	.333	31	–	26	–	0	.544
Duke ‍‍‍	10	–	20	–	0	.333	26	–	31	–	0	.456
† – Conference champion ‡ – Tournament champion y – Invited to the NCAA Tournament; As of June 23, 2026; Rankings from D1Baseball

The 2026 Georgia Tech Yellow Jackets baseball team represented Georgia Tech during the 2026 NCAA Division I baseball season. The Yellow Jackets played their home games at Russ Chandler Stadium as a member of the Atlantic Coast Conference. They were led by head coach James Ramsey.

== Previous season ==
The 2025 Georgia Tech Yellow Jackets finished with an overall record of 41-19 and a conference record of 19-11 in the ACC. They won the ACC regular season baseball title before being eliminated in the Oxford Regional by Ole Miss.

== Personnel ==
=== Roster ===
2026 Georgia Tech Yellow Jackets roster
Pitchers: 15 - Cooper Underwood - Freshman; 16 - Charlie Wilcox - Freshman; 18 - Caden Gaudette - (redshirt) Junior; 20 - Caden Spivey - Senior; 21 - Carson Ballard - (redshirt) Junior; 22 - Tate McKee - Junior; 24 - Jackson Blakely - Sophomore; 26 - Jamie Vicens - Freshman; 29 - Mason Patel - Graduate; 31 - Justin Shadek - (redshirt) Sophomore; 32 - Brett Barfield - Senior; 35 - Jake Lankie - (redshirt) Sophomore; 37 - Dylan Loy - Junior; 43 - Dimitri Angelakos - (redshirt) Freshman; 49 - Kayden Campbell - Senior; 54 - Riley Hasenstab - (redshirt) Freshman; 55 - Adam McKelvey - Sophomore; 99 - Porter Buursema - Junior	Catchers: 5 - Dominic Stephenson - Fresman; 19 - Nathanael Coupet - (redshirt) Sophomore; 25 - Vahn Lackey - Junior; Infielders: 0 - Michael Dee - Freshman; 2 - Jarren Advincula - Junior; 3 - Carson Kerce - Junior; 10 - Kent Schmidt - Junior; 11 - Ryan Zuckerman - Junior; 39 - Tyler Neises - Junior	Outfielders: 1 - Parker Brosius - Senior; 8 - Drew Burress - Junior; 9 - Coleman Lewis - Freshman; Utility: 4 - Alex Hernandez (RHP/UTL) - Sophomore; 6 - Caleb Daniel (OF/UTL) - Sophomore; 7 - Will Baker (INF/UTL) - Sophomore; 14 - Cade Brown (OF/INF) - Sophomore; 34 - Drew Rodgers (C/INF) - Sophomore; 41 - Judson Hartwell (INF/OF) - Freshman

=== Coaching staff ===
2026 Georgia Tech Yellow Jackets coaching staff
Name	Position	Seasons at Georgia Tech	Alma Mater
James Ramsey	Head coach	8	Florida State (2012)
Matt Taylor	Assistant coach	3	Columbus State (2017)
Josh Schulman	Assistant coach	2	Texas A&M (2017)

== Schedule ==
2026 Georgia Tech Yellow Jackets baseball game log (50–11)
Regular season: 45–9 (Home: 30–4; Away: 13–5; Neutral: 2–0)

February: 10–1 (Home: 9–1; Away: 1–0; Neutral: 0–0)
Date	TV	Opponent	Rank	Stadium	Score	Win	Loss	Save	Attendance	Overall	ACC
February 13	ACCNX	Bowling Green*	No. 5	Russ Chandler Stadium; Atlanta, GA	W 11–5	McKee (1–0)	Turner (0–1)	None	2,613	1–0	—
February 14 (Note: Part of a doubleheader.)	ACCNX	Bowling Green*	No. 5	Russ Chandler Stadium	W 27–4	Patel (1–0)	Sova (0–1)	None	2,419	2–0	—
February 14	ACCNX	Bowling Green*	No. 5	Russ Chandler Stadium	W 12–2^{7}	Campbell (1–0)	Heffernan (0–1)	None	2,523	3–0	—
February 17	ESPN+	at Georgia Southern*	No. 5	J. I. Clements Stadium; Statesboro, GA	W 25–1	Blakely (1–0)	Holder (0–2)	None	3,387	4–0	—
February 20	ACCNX	Stony Brook*	No. 5	Russ Chandler Stadium	W 14–5	Campbell (2–0)	Panariello (0–1)	None		5–0	—
February 20	ACCNX	Stony Brook*	No. 5	Russ Chandler Stadium	W 10–5^{7}			None	2,319	6–0	—
February 21	ACCNX	Stony Brook*	No. 5	Russ Chandler Stadium	W 6–5^{10}	Ballard (1–0)	Rizzo (0–1)	None	2,212	7–0	—
February 22	ACCNX	Stony Brook*	No. 5	Russ Chandler Stadium	W 21–3^{7}	Underwood (1–0)	Rizzo (0–2)	None	2,011	8–0	—
February 24	ACCNX	Georgia State*	No. 5	Russ Chandler Stadium	L 4–9	Cooper (1–0)	Campbell (2–1)	Bartkoski (2)	2,119	8–1	—
February 27	ACCNX	Northwestern*	No. 5	Russ Chandler Stadium	W 17–3^{7}	McKee (2–0)	Hliboki (1–2)	None	2,213	9–1	—
February 28	ACCNX	Northwestern*	No. 5	Russ Chandler Stadium	W 13–3^{7}	Loy (1–0)	Weaver (0–1)	Lankie (1)	3,720	10–1	—

March: 13–4 (Home: 8–1; Away: 4–3; Neutral: 1–0)
Date	TV	Opponent	Rank	Stadium	Score	Win	Loss	Save	Attendance	Overall	ACC
March 1	ACCNX	Northwestern*	No. 5	Russ Chandler Stadium	W 14–6	Shadek (1–0)	Kouser (1–2)	None	2,010	11–1	—
March 3	ESPN+	at Georgia State*	No. 5	Gwinnett Field; Lawrenceville, GA	W 4–1	Angelakos (1–0)	Roberts (0–1)	Spivey (1)	539	12–1	—
March 6	ACCNX	Virginia Tech	No. 5	Russ Chandler Stadium	W 16–1^{7}	Ballard (2–0)	Grim (0–2)	None	2,521	13–1	1–0
March 7	ACCNX	Virginia Tech	No. 5	Russ Chandler Stadium	W 14–5	Gaudette (1–0)	Swift (1–1)	None	3,341	14–1	2–0
March 8	ACCNX	Virginia Tech	No. 5	Russ Chandler Stadium	L 6–9	Craytor (2–0)	Buursemma (0–1)	Crowl (1)	2,010	14–2	2–1
March 10	ACCNX	West Georgia*	No. 4	Russ Chandler Stadium	W 14–0^{7}	McKelvey (1–0)	Torres (0–3)	None	2,121	15–2	—
March 12	ACCN	at No. 11 Clemson	No. 4	Doug Kingsmore Stadium; Clemson, SC	W 10–0^{7}	McKee (3–0)	Knaak (0–2)	None	4,437	16–2	3–1
March 13	ACCN	at No. 11 Clemson	No. 4	Doug Kingsmore Stadium	W 9–3	Patel (2–0)	Sharman (4–1)	None	4,522	17–2	4–1
March 14	ACCNX	at No. 11 Clemson	No. 4	Doug Kingsmore Stadium	L 7–13	Brown (2–0)	Blakely (1–1)	None	5,085	17–3	4–2
March 17	SECN+	at No. 5 Auburn*	No. 3	Plainsman Park; Auburn, AL	L 2–9	Alvarez (3–1)	Angelakos (1–1)	None	6,498	17–4	—
March 20	ACCNX	at Pitt	No. 3	Charles L. Cost Field; Pittsburgh, PA	W 11–9	McKelvey (2–0)	Leslie (2–1)	Patel (1)	N/A	18–4	5–2
March 21	ACCNX	at Pitt	No. 3	Charles L. Cost Field	L 9–14	McAuliff (3–1)	Loy (1–1)	Smink (1)	560	18–5	5–3
March 22	ACCNX	at Pitt	No. 3	Charles L. Cost Field	W 12–4^{7}	Blakely (2–1)	Lafferty (3–2)	None	525	19–5	6–3
March 27	ACCNX	No. 14 NC State	No. 3	Russ Chandler Stadium	W 3–1	McKee (4–0)	Marohn (4–1)	Patel (2)	2,314	20–5	7–3
March 28	ACCN	No. 14 NC State	No. 3	Russ Chandler Stadium	W 6–4	Gaudette (2–0)	Nance (1–1)	Barfield (1)	2,864	21–5	8–3
March 29	ACCN	No. 14 NC State	No. 3	Russ Chandler Stadium	W 10–0^{8}	Blakely (3–1)	Consiglio (2–2)	None	2,987	22–5	9–3
March 31	ESPN2	No. 18 Auburn*	No. 3	Russ Chandler Stadium	W 13–3^{8}	Loy (2–1)	Chatterton (2–1)	None	4,033	23–5	—

April: 14–3 (Home: 8–1; Away: 5–2; Neutral: 1–0)
Date	TV	Opponent	Rank	Stadium	Score	Win	Loss	Save	Attendance	Overall	ACC
April 2	ACCNX	at California	No. 3	Evans Diamond; Berkeley, CA	W 17–2^{7}	McKee (5–0)	Espinosa (1–1)	None	395	24–5	10–3
April 3	ACCNX	at California	No. 3	Evans Diamond	W 7–3	Barfield (2–0)	de la Torre (1–4)	None	986	25–5	11–3
April 4	ACCNX	at California	No. 3	Evans Diamond	W 9–3	Blakely (4–1)	Eddy (4–2)	None	715	26–5	12–3
April 7	ACCNX	Kennesaw State*	No. 3	Russ Chandler Stadium	W 11–4	Ballard (3–0)	Summerville (0–2)	None	2,986	27–5	—
April 9	ACCN	No. 5 Florida State	No. 3	Russ Chandler Stadium	W 4–3	McKee (6–0)	Abraham (1–1)	Patel (3)	4,045	28–5	13–3
April 10	ACCN	No. 5 Florida State	No. 3	Russ Chandler Stadium	W 8–3	Gaudette (3–0)	Beard (3–1)	Loy (1)	4,214	29–5	14–3
April 11	ACCNX	No. 5 Florida State	No. 3	Russ Chandler Stadium	W 17–3	Blakely (5–1)	Stokes (0–1)	None	4,326	30–5	15–3
April 14	ACCNX	Georgia Southern*	No. 2	Russ Chandler Stadium	W 13–9	Ballard (4–0)	Garrett (0–7)	None	2,652	31–5	—
April 17	ACCNX	at No. 3 North Carolina	No. 2	Boshamer Stadium; Chapel Hill, NC	L 2–5	DeCaro (6–2)	McKee (6–1)	McDuffie (3)	4,357	31–6	15–4
April 18	ACCN	at No. 3 North Carolina	No. 2	Boshamer Stadium	L 4–14^{8}	Lynch (3–3)	Buursema (0–2)	None	3,604	31–7	15–5
April 19	ACCN	at No. 3 North Carolina	No. 2	Boshamer Stadium	W 5–2	Gaudette (4–0)	Boaz (3–1)	Patel (4)	3,759	32–7	16–5
Children's Healthcare of Atlanta Spring Baseball Classic
April 21	SECN	vs. No. 5 Georgia*	No. 3	Truist Park; Cumberland, GA	W 14–4^{7}	Ballard (5–0)	Farley (4–1)	None	20,000	33–7	—
April 24	ACCNX	Wake Forest	No. 3	Russ Chandler Stadium	W 6–5	McKee (7–1)	Levonas (8–3)	Patel (5)	3,486	34–7	17–5
April 25	ACCN	Wake Forest	No. 3	Russ Chandler Stadium	W 14–11	Underwood (2–0)	Bowie (1–2)	None	3,013	35–7	18–5
April 26	ACCNX	Wake Forest	No. 3	Russ Chandler Stadium	W 6–5	Loy (3–1)	Bosch (0–1)	Gaudette (1)	3,001	36–7	19–5
April 28	ESPN+	at Kennesaw State	No. 3	Fred Stillwell Stadium; Kennesaw, GA	W 10–7	Spivey (1–0)	Summerville (0–3)	Patel (6)	1,567	37–7	—

May: 8–2 (Home: 5–2; Away: 3–0; Neutral: 0–0)
Date	TV	Opponent	Rank	Stadium	Score	Win	Loss	Save	Attendance	Overall	ACC
May 1	ACCNX	Xavier*	No. 3	Russ Chandler Stadium	L 4–8	Murphy (3–0)	Gaudette (4–1)	None	2,863	37–8	—
May 2	ACCNX	Xavier*	No. 3	Russ Chandler Stadium	W 7–5	Barfield (3–0)	Bridenthal (1–1)	None	3,012	38–8	—
May 3	ACCNX	Xavier*	No. 3	Russ Chandler Stadium	W 14–6	Gaudette (5–1)	Vasiliou (1–2)	None	3,004	39–8	—
May 8	ACCNX	Duke	No. 3	Russ Chandler Stadium	W 10–9^{10}	Patel (3–0)	Boisvert (0–1)	None	3,384	40–8	20–5
May 9	ACCNX	Duke	No. 3	Russ Chandler Stadium	W 15–2^{7}	Ballard (6–0)	Weaver (4–7)	None	3,622	41–8	21–5
May 10	ACCNX	Duke	No. 3	Russ Chandler Stadium	W 14–1^{7}	Blakely (6–1)	Leon (2–4)	None	3,026	42–8	22–5
May 12	ACCNX	Mercer*	No. 3	Russ Chandler Stadium	L 9–12	Johnson (3–3)	Lankie (0–1)	Garnett (1)	3,001	42–9	—
May 14	ACCNX	at No. 23 Boston College	No. 3	Eddie Pellagrini Diamond; Chestnut Hill, MA	W 9–0	McKee (8–1)	Colarusso (5–3)	None	677	43–9	23–5
May 15	ACCNX	at No. 23 Boston College	No. 3	Eddie Pellagrini Diamond	W 14–1	Ballard (6–0)	Mudd (4–4)	Patel (7)	1,642	44–9	24–5
May 16	ACCN	at No. 23 Boston College	No. 3	Eddie Pellagrini Diamond	W 15–2^{7}	Blakely (7–1)	Miller (2–3)	None	2,828	45–9	25–5

Postseason: 5–2

ACC tournament: 3–0
Date	TV	Opponent	Rank	Stadium	Score	Win	Loss	Save	Attendance	Overall	ACCT Record
May 21	ACCN	vs. (8) Virginia	(1); No. 3	Truist Field; Charlotte, NC	W 16–10	Patel (4–0)	Stammel (3–5)	None	2,906	46–9	1–0
May 23	ACCN	vs. (5) Miami	(1); No. 3	Truist Field	W 9–3	Blakely (8–1)	Ciscar (5–4)	None	4,296	47–9	2–0
May 24	ESPN2	vs. No. 2 (2) North Carolina	(1); No. 3	Truist Field	W 13–6	Gaudette (6–1)	Boaz (3–3)	None	8,574	48–9	3–0

Atlanta Regional: 2–2
Date	TV	Opponent	Rank	Stadium	Score	Win	Loss	Save	Attendance	Overall	NCAAT Record
May 29	ACCN	vs. UIC	No. 2	Russ Chandler Stadium	W 22–5	Lankie (1–1)	Lei (8–5)	None	3,611	49–9	1–0
May 30	ESPN+	vs. Oklahoma	No. 2	Russ Chandler Stadium	W 9–3	McKee (9–1)	Mercurius (0–2)	None	3,774	50–9	2–0
May 31	ESPN+	vs. Oklahoma	No. 2	Russ Chandler Stadium	L 8–15	Jones (1–0)	Gaudette (6–2)	Mercurius (2)	3,833	50–10	2–1
June 1	ESPNU	vs. Oklahoma	No. 2	Russ Chandler Stadium	L 7–8^{10}	Cleveland (3–2)	McKee (9–2)	None	3,904	50–11	2–2

Legend: = Win = Loss = Canceled
Bold =Georgia Tech team member
Rankings are based on the team's current ranking in the D1Baseball poll.

Schedule Notes

== Rankings ==
Ranking movements Legend: ██ Increase in ranking ██ Decrease in ranking ( ) = First-place votes
	Week																	
Poll	Pre	1	2	3	4	5	6	7	8	9	10	11	12	13	14	15	16	Final
Coaches'	4	4*	4	5	4	3	3	3	3	2	3	3 (1)	3	3	3 (1)	2 (4)	2	11
Baseball America	4	4	4	4	4	3	3	3	3	2	4	4	4	3	2	2*	2*	10
NCBWA†	4	4	4	4	4	3	3	3	3	2	3	3	3	3	2	2*	11	13
D1Baseball	5	5	5	5	4	3	3	3	3	2	3	3	3	3	3	2	2 (4)*	10
Perfect Game	2	2	2	3	3	3	3	3	2	2	4	3	3	3	3	3*	3*	18

† NCBWA ranks 30 teams in their preseason poll, but only ranks 25 teams weekly during the season.
* A new poll was not released for this week, so for comparison purposes, the previous week's ranking is inserted in this week's slot.
