= 2026 Miami Hurricanes baseball team =

American college baseball season

2026 Miami Hurricanes baseball

NCAA Gainesville Regional
- Conference: Atlantic Coast Conference
- Record: 39–20 (16–14 ACC)
- Head coach: J.D. Arteaga (3rd season)
- Assistant coaches: Laz Gutierrez (3rd season); Chris Dominguez (2nd season); Jonathan Anderson (3rd season)
- Home stadium: Alex Rodriguez Park at Mark Light Field

2026 Atlantic Coast Conference baseball standings
	Conf.						Overall
Team	W		L		T	PCT	W		L		T	PCT
No. 2 Georgia Tech ‍†‍‡‍^{y}	25	–	5	–	0	.833	45	–	9	–	0	.833
No. 4 North Carolina ‍‍‍^{y}	22	–	8	–	0	.733	43	–	10	–	1	.806
No. 12 Florida State ‍‍‍^{y}	19	–	11	–	0	.633	38	–	16	–	0	.704
Boston College ‍‍‍^{y}	17	–	13	–	0	.567	36	–	20	–	0	.643
Wake Forest ‍‍‍^{y}	16	–	14	–	0	.533	38	–	18	–	0	.679
Miami (FL) ‍‍‍^{y}	16	–	14	–	0	.533	36	–	17	–	0	.679
Virginia Tech ‍‍‍^{y}	15	–	15	–	0	.500	29	–	23	–	0	.558
Virginia ‍‍‍^{y}	14	–	16	–	0	.467	36	–	20	–	0	.643
NC State ‍‍‍^{y}	14	–	16	–	0	.467	32	–	21	–	0	.604
Louisville ‍‍‍	13	–	17	–	0	.433	30	–	26	–	0	.536
Notre Dame ‍‍‍	13	–	17	–	0	.433	30	–	21	–	0	.588
Stanford ‍‍‍	13	–	17	–	0	.433	28	–	25	–	0	.528
California ‍‍‍	12	–	18	–	0	.400	29	–	26	–	0	.527
Pittsburgh ‍‍‍	11	–	19	–	0	.367	30	–	23	–	0	.566
Clemson ‍‍‍	10	–	20	–	0	.333	31	–	25	–	0	.554
Duke ‍‍‍	10	–	20	–	0	.333	25	–	31	–	0	.446
† – Conference champion ‡ – Tournament champion y – Invited to the NCAA Tournament; As of May 17, 2026; Rankings from D1Baseball

The 2026 Miami Hurricanes baseball team represent the University of Miami during the 2026 NCAA Division I baseball season. The Hurricanes play their home games at Alex Rodriguez Park at Mark Light Field as a member of the Atlantic Coast Conference (ACC). The Hurricanes are led by head coach J.D. Arteaga, who is in his 3rd season as head coach, and 24th season overall at Miami.

== Roster ==
2026 Miami Hurricanes roster
Pitchers	Catchers Infielders	Outfielders	Two Way Players

=== Coaches ===
2026 Miami Hurricanes baseball coaching staff
- J.D. Arteaga – Head coach – 3rd season
- Laz Gutierrez – Assistant coach – 3rd season
- Chris Dominguez – Assistant coach – 3rd season
- Jonathan Anderson – Assistant coach – 3rd season

Note: Season counter accounts for all stints at Miami (FL).

== Personnel ==
=== Starters ===
Opening Night Lineup
Pos.	No.	Player.	Year
LF			
CF			
SS			
DH			
1B			
RF			
3B			
C			
2B			

Weekend pitching rotation
Day	No.	Player.	Year
Friday			
Saturday			
Sunday			

== Schedule and results ==
2026 Miami Hurricans baseball game log
(Overall: 39–20; Conference: 16–14); (Home: 25–9; Away: 11–9; Neutral: 3–2)
Regular season (36–17)
February (10–2)
(Home; 9–2; Away: 1–0)

Date	Time	Opponent	Rank	TV	Venue	Score	Win	Loss	Save	Attendance	Overall record	ACC record
February 13	7:00 p.m.	Lehigh*	No. 22	ACCNX	Alex Rodriguez Park at Mark Light Field • Coral Gables, FL	**W** 13–2	**Ciscar** (1–0)	O'Hearen (0–1)	None	3,221	1–0	—
February 14	6:00 p.m.	Lehigh*	No. 22	ACCNX	Alex Rodriguez Park at Mark Light Field	**W** 17–11	**Coats** (1–0)	Leaman (0–1)	None		2–0	—
February 15	12:00 p.m.	Lehigh*	No. 22	ACCNX	Alex Rodriguez Park at Mark Light Field	**W** 27–3^{(7)}	**DeRias** (1–0)	O'Neill (0–1)	None	2,516	3–0	—
February 17	6:00 p.m.	UCF*	No. 23	ACCNX	Alex Rodriguez Park at Mark Light Field	**W** 8–7^{(13)}	**Bradley-Cooney** (1–0)	Kimball (0–1)	None		4–0	—
February 18	6:00 p.m.	Indiana State*	No. 23	ACCNX	Alex Rodriguez Park at Mark Light Field	**W** 6–2	**Evans** (1–0)	Small (0–1)	None	2,356	5–0	—
February 20	7:00 p.m.	Lafayette*	No. 23	ACCNX	Alex Rodriguez Park at Mark Light Field	**W** 15–2	**Ciscar** (2–0)	Helmick (0–1)	None	2,891	6–0	—
February 21	2:00 p.m.	Lafayette*	No. 23	ACCNX	Alex Rodriguez Park at Mark Light Field	**W** 14–4^{(7)}	**Evans** (2–0)	Deitelbaum (0–1)	None	2,361	7–0	—
February 21	6:00 p.m.	Lafayette*	No. 23	ACCNX	Alex Rodriguez Park at Mark Light Field	**W** 14–3^{(7)}	**Collera** (1–0)	Florio (0–1)	None	2,559	8–0	—
February 22	1:00 p.m.	Lafayette*	No. 23	ACCNX	Alex Rodriguez Park at Mark Light Field	**W** 30–5	**DeRias** (2–0)	Zaffiro (0–1)	None	2,441	9–0	—
February 25	6:30 p.m.	at Florida Atlantic*	No. 17		FAU Baseball Stadium • Boca Raton, FL	**W** 11–7	**Bilka** (1–0)	Boully (0–1)	None	1,091	10–0	—
February 27	7:00 p.m.	No. 10 Florida*	No. 17	ACCN	Alex Rodriguez Park at Mark Light Field	**L** 2–7	Barberi (2–1)	**Ciscar** (2–1)	None	3,555	10–1	—
February 28	6:00 p.m.	No. 10 Florida*	No. 17	ACCN	Alex Rodriguez Park at Mark Light Field	**L** 4–8	Reeth (2–0)	**Evans** (2–1)	None	3,555	10–2	—

March (12–5)
(Home; 7–2; Away: 5–3)

Date	Time	Opponent	Rank	TV	Venue	Score	Win	Loss	Save	Attendance	Overall record	ACC record
March 1	1:00 p.m.	No. 10 Florida*	No. 17	ACCN	Alex Rodriguez Park at Mark Light Field	Cancelled (rain)						
March 4	6:00 p.m.	Bethune–Cookman*	No. 24	ESPN+	Alex Rodriguez Park at Mark Light Field	**W** 5–2	**Dorn** (1–0)	Anselmo (0–1)	**Bilka** (1)	2,345	11–2	—
March 6	7:00 p.m.	Boston College	No. 24	ACCNX	Alex Rodriguez Park at Mark Light Field	**L** 7–8^{(11)}	Hard (1–1)	**Collera** (1–1)	None	2,818	11–3	0–1
March 7	7:00 p.m.	Boston College	No. 24	ACCNX	Alex Rodriguez Park at Mark Light Field	**W** 5–3	**Evans** (3–1)	Mudd (1–2)	**Bradley-Cooney** (1)	2,876	12–3	1–1
March 8	1:00 p.m.	Boston College	No. 24	ACCNX	Alex Rodriguez Park at Mark Light Field	**L** 5–9	Kwiatkowski (3–1)	**Durso** (0–1)	Kipp (1)	2,894	12–4	1–2
March 11	6:00 p.m.	at UCF*		ESPN+	John Euliano Park • Orlando, FL	**W** 9–5	**Coats** (2–0)	Murray (1–1)	None	3,012	13–4	—
March 13	6:00 p.m.	at Duke		ACCNX	Jack Coombs Field • Durham, NC	**L** 0–4	Weaver (4–1)	**Ciscar** (2–2)	O'Connell (4)	774	13–5	1–3
March 14	4:00 p.m.	at Duke		ACCNX	Jack Coombs Field	**W** 9–0	**Evans** (4–1)	Nochowitz (1–1)	None	968	14–5	2–3
March 15	11:00 a.m.	at Duke		ACCNX	Jack Coombs Field	**L** 10–20^{(7)}	Hedrick (2–0)	**Bradley-Cooney** (1–1)	None	753	14–6	2–4
March 18	6:00 p.m.	at FIU*			FIU Baseball Stadium • Miami, FL	**W** 10–3	**Dorn** (2–0)	Urena (0–2)	None	702	15–6	—
March 20	7:00 p.m.	Creighton*		ACCNX	Alex Rodriguez Park at Mark Light Field	**W** 9–4	**Glidewell** (2–0)	Adams (2–2)	None	2,659	16–6	—
March 21	6:00 p.m.	Creighton*		ACCNX	Alex Rodriguez Park at Mark Light Field	**W** 11–1^{(8)}	**Evans** (5–1)	Koosman (0–2)	None	2,667	17–6	—
March 22	1:00 p.m.	Creighton*		ACCNX	Alex Rodriguez Park at Mark Light Field	**W** 15–5^{(8)}	**Coats** (3–0)	Nissen (0–1)	None	2,842	18–6	—
March 24	6:00 p.m.	Florida Atlantic*			Alex Rodriguez Park at Mark Light Field	**W** 10–6	**Coats** (4–0)	Robinson (0–1)	None	2,783	19–6	—
March 26	7:00 p.m.	at Clemson		ACCN	Doug Kingsmore Stadium • Clemson, SC	**W** 8–3^{(10)}	**Bilka** (2–0)	Brown (2–1)	None	4,689	20–6	3–4
March 27	8:00 p.m.	at Clemson		ACCN	Doug Kingsmore Stadium	**L** 6–7	Nelson (1–2)	**Coats** (4–1)	LeGuernic (2)	4,853	20–7	3–5
March 28	3:00 p.m.	at Clemson		ACCNX	Doug Kingsmore Stadium	**W** 8–6	**Collera** (2–1)	Titsworth (3–2)	None	5,728	21–7	4–5
March 31	6:00 p.m.	Florida Gulf Coast*		ACCNX	Alex Rodriguez Park at Mark Light Field	**W** 12–4	**Dorn** (3–0)	Rogers (3–3)	None	2,742	22–7	—

April (10–5)
(Home; 7–4; Away: 3–1)

Date	Time	Opponent	Rank	TV	Venue	Score	Win	Loss	Save	Attendance	Overall record	ACC record
April 3	7:00 p.m.	Virginia Tech		ACCNX	Alex Rodriguez Park at Mark Light Field	**W** 19–1^{(7)}	**Evans** (6–1)	Yagesh (2–2)	None	3,009	23–7	5–5
April 4	6:00 p.m.	Virginia Tech		ACCNX	Alex Rodriguez Park at Mark Light Field	**W** 8–6	**Collera** (3–1)	Renfrow (1–4)	None	2,952	24–7	6–5
April 5	1:00 p.m.	Virginia Tech		ACCNX	Alex Rodriguez Park at Mark Light Field	**L** 3–6	Stieg (2–1)	**Ciscar** (2–3)	Crowl (4)	2,557	24–8	6–6
April 7	6:00 p.m.	FIU*			Alex Rodriguez Park at Mark Light Field	**W** 9–7	**Coats** (5–1)	Lastres (0–1)	**Bilka** (1)	3,276	25–8	—
April 10	7:00 p.m.	Wake Forest		ACCNX	Alex Rodriguez Park at Mark Light Field	**W** 3–1	**Evans** (7–1)	Levonas (7–2)	**Bilka** (2)	3,173	26–8	7–6
April 11	6:00 p.m.	Wake Forest		ACCNX	Alex Rodriguez Park at Mark Light Field	**L** 1–3	Dressler (5–1)	**Collera** (3–2)	Ray (1)	3,475	26–9	7–7
April 12	1:00 p.m.	Wake Forest		ACCNX	Alex Rodriguez Park at Mark Light Field	**W** 8–0	**Ciscar** (3–3)	Bagwell (2–1)	None	2,768	27–9	8–7
April 15	6:00 p.m.	South Florida*		ACCNX	Alex Rodriguez Park at Mark Light Field	**L** 2–4	Pontbriant (2–0)	**Coats** (5–2)	Sutton (8)	3,446	27–10	—
April 17	9:00 p.m.	at Stanford		ACCNX	Klein Field at Sunken Diamond • Palo Alto, CA	**W** 6–3	**Evans** (8–1)	Marsh (0–1)	None	1,503	28–10	9–7
April 18	5:00 p.m.	at Stanford		ACCNX	Klein Field at Sunken Diamond	**W** 4–3	**Dorn** (4–0)	Gomez (3–1)	**Bilka** (3)	1,741	29–10	10–7
April 19	4:00 p.m.	at Stanford		ACCNX	Klein Field at Sunken Diamond	**L** 6–14	Peterson (3–1)	**Santos-Olson** (0–1)	None	2,341	29–11	10–8
April 22	6:30 p.m.	at Florida Atlantic*		ESPN+	FAU Baseball Stadium	**W** 5–4	**Dorn** (5–0)	Murphy (1–5)	**Glidewell** (1)	922	30–11	—
April 24	7:00 p.m.	California		ACCNX	Alex Rodriguez Park at Mark Light Field	**L** 2–9	de la Torre (4–4)	**Evans** (8–2)	None	2,863	30–12	10–9
April 25	6:00 p.m.	California		ACCNX	Alex Rodriguez Park at Mark Light Field	**W** 4–3	**Glidewell** (3–0)	Clark (2–3)	None	3,194	31–12	11–9
April 26	1:00 p.m.	California		ACCNX	Alex Rodriguez Park at Mark Light Field	**W** 4–1	**Ciscar** (4–3)	Espinoza (2–2)	**Glidewell** (2)	3,528	32–12	12–9

May (4–5)
(Home; 2–1; Away: 2–4)

Date	Time	Opponent	Rank	TV	Venue	Score	Win	Loss	Save	Attendance	Overall record	ACC record
May 1	3:00 p.m.	at NC State		ACCNX	Doak Field • Raleigh, NC	**W** 12–9	**Lofgren** (1–0)	Garino (3–3)	**Glidewell** (3)	2,393	33–12	13–9
May 1	6:00 p.m.	at NC State		ACCNX	Doak Field	**L** 6–13	**Consiglio** (3–3)	Evans (8–3)	None	2,743	33–13	13–10
May 2	7:00 p.m.	at NC State		ESPN2	Doak Field	**L** 7–12	Nance (3–1)	**Braley-Cooney** (1–2)	None	2,652	33–14	13–11
May 5	6:00 p.m.	FIU*			Alex Rodriguez Park at Mark Light Field	**Canceled (poor field conditions)**						
May 7	7:00 p.m.	Louisville		ACCNX	Alex Rodriguez Park at Mark Light Field	**W** 13–8	**Evans** (9–3)	Starke (1–1)	None	3,064	34–14	14–11
May 8	7:00 p.m.	Louisville		ACCNX	Alex Rodriguez Park at Mark Light Field	**L** 9–16^{(11)}	England (3–2)	**Bilka** (2–1)	None	2,715	34–15	14–12
May 9	2:00 p.m.	Louisville		ACCNX	Alex Rodriguez Park at Mark Light Field	**W** 10–8	**Coats** (6–2)	Michael (0–3)	**Gildewell** (4)	2,901	35–15	15–12
May 14	6:00 p.m.	at No. 11 Florida State		ACCNX	Dick Howser Stadium • Tallahassee, FL	**L** 8–10	Coats (6–2)	**Michael** (0–3)	Glidewell (4)	2,901	35–16	15–13
May 15	6:00 p.m.	at No. 11 Florida State		ACCNX	Dick Howser Stadium	**L** 1–11^{(8)}	Beard (6–1)	**Collera** (3–3)	None	5,772	35–17	15–14
May 16	2:00 p.m.	at No. 11 Florida State		ACCNX	Dick Howser Stadium	**W** 7–4	**Ciscar** (5–3)	Moore (6–2)	**Glidewell** (5)	5,620	36–17	16–14

Postseason (3–3)
ACC Tournament (2–1)

Date	Time	Opponent	Rank	TV	Venue	Score	Win	Loss	Save	Attendance	Overall record	Tournament record
May 20	1:00 p.m.	vs. (12) Stanford	(5)	ACCN	Truist Field • Charlotte, NC	**W** 11–2	**Evans** (10–3)	Shaw (1–1)	None	3,588	37–17	1–0
May 21	7:00 p.m.	vs. (4) Boston College	(5)	ACCN	Truist Field	**W** 8–2	**Collera** (4–3)	Colarusso (5–4)	None	3,014	38–17	2–0
May 23	7:00 p.m.	vs. (1); No. 3 Georgia Tech	(5)	ACCN	Truist Field	**L** 3–9	Blakely (8–1)	**Ciscar** (5–4)	None	4,296	38–18	2–1

Gainesville Regional (1–2)

Date	Time	Opponent	Rank	TV	Venue	Score	Win	Loss	Save	Attendance	Overall record	Tournament record
May 29	6:00 p.m.	vs. (3) Troy	(2)	ACCN	Condron Ballpark • Gainesville, FL	**W** 10–5	**Glidewell** (4–0)	Egan (5–5)	None	3,543	39–18	1–0
May 30	8:00 p.m.	at (1) No. 10 Florida	(2)	ACCN	Condron Ballpark	**L** 10–22	Barberi (5–2)	**Durso** (0–2)	None	5,673	39–19	1–1
May 31	12:00 p.m.	vs. (3) Troy	(2)	ACCN	Condron Ballpark	**L** 6–9	Crotchfelt (7–2)	**Dorn** (5–2)	None		39–20	1–2

"#" represents ranking. All rankings from D1 Baseball Poll on the date of the contest.
"()" represents postseason seeding in the ACC Tournament or NCAA Regional, respectively.
Gametime is in EST
= Win, = Loss, = Canceled/Postponed
Bold = **Miami Hurricanes team member**
* = Non-Conference Game
Schedule Source:

== Rankings ==
Ranking movements Legend: ██ Increase in ranking ██ Decrease in ranking — = Not ranked RV = Received votes т = Tied with team above or below
	Week																	
Poll	Pre	1	2	3	4	5	6	7	8	9	10	11	12	13	14	15	16	Final
Coaches'	21	21*	16	21т	RV	—	—	—	RV	RV	RV	RV	RV	RV	RV	RV	RV*	
Baseball America	25	23	22	23	—	—	—	—	—	—	—	—	—	—	—	—*	—*	
NCBWA†	22	20	16	23	RV	RV	RV	RV	RV	RV	RV	RV	RV	RV	RV	RV*	RV	
D1Baseball	22	23	17	24	—	—	—	—	—	—	—	—	—	—	—	—*	—*	
Perfect Game	24	21	21	—	—	—	—	—	24	20	25	20	—	—	—	—*	—*	

† NCBWA ranks 30 teams in their preseason poll, but only ranks 25 teams weekly during the season.
* A new poll was not released for this week, so for comparison purposes, the previous week's ranking is inserted in this week's slot.
