= 2026 North Carolina Tar Heels baseball team =

Sports team

2026 North Carolina Tar Heels baseball

NCAA Chapel Hill Regional Champions NCAA Chapel Hill Super Regional Champions

College World Series, Runner-up
- Conference: Atlantic Coast Conference

Ranking
- Coaches: No. 2
- D1Baseball.com: No. 2
- Record: 54–14–1 (22–8 ACC)
- Head coach: Scott Forbes (6th season)
- Assistant coaches: Bryant Gaines (16th season); Jesse Wierzbicki (10th season); Scott Jackson (10th season); Jason Howell (6th season)
- Home stadium: Boshamer Stadium

2026 Atlantic Coast Conference baseball standings
	Conf.						Overall
Team	W		L		T	PCT	W		L		T	PCT
No. 10 Georgia Tech ‍†‍‡‍^{y}	25	–	5	–	0	.833	50	–	11	–	0	.820
No. 2 North Carolina ‍‍‍^{y}	22	–	8	–	0	.733	54	–	14	–	1	.790
No. 18 Florida State ‍‍‍^{y}	19	–	11	–	0	.633	40	–	19	–	0	.678
Boston College ‍‍‍^{y}	17	–	13	–	0	.567	40	–	24	–	0	.625
Wake Forest ‍‍‍^{y}	16	–	14	–	0	.533	39	–	21	–	0	.650
Miami (FL) ‍‍‍^{y}	16	–	14	–	0	.533	39	–	20	–	0	.661
Virginia Tech ‍‍‍^{y}	15	–	15	–	0	.500	30	–	26	–	0	.536
Virginia ‍‍‍^{y}	14	–	16	–	0	.467	37	–	23	–	0	.617
NC State ‍‍‍^{y}	14	–	16	–	0	.467	32	–	24	–	0	.571
Louisville ‍‍‍	13	–	17	–	0	.433	30	–	27	–	0	.526
Notre Dame ‍‍‍	13	–	17	–	0	.433	31	–	22	–	0	.585
Stanford ‍‍‍	13	–	17	–	0	.433	28	–	26	–	0	.519
California ‍‍‍	12	–	18	–	0	.400	29	–	26	–	0	.527
Pittsburgh ‍‍‍	11	–	19	–	0	.367	33	–	24	–	0	.579
Clemson ‍‍‍	10	–	20	–	0	.333	31	–	26	–	0	.544
Duke ‍‍‍	10	–	20	–	0	.333	26	–	31	–	0	.456
† – Conference champion ‡ – Tournament champion y – Invited to the NCAA Tournament; As of June 23, 2026; Rankings from D1Baseball

The 2026 North Carolina Tar Heels baseball team represented the University of North Carolina at Chapel Hill during the 2026 NCAA Division I baseball season. The Tar Heels played their home games at Boshamer Stadium in Chapel Hill, North Carolina. It was Scott Forbes' 6th season as head coach of the Tar Heels. The team was a member of the Atlantic Coast Conference.

== Previous season ==
Last season, the team went 46-15 overall, and 18-11 in ACC Conference play. They won the ACC Championship for the first time since 2022 when they defeated the Clemson Tigers 14-4 in the championship game at Durham Bulls Athletic Park. The Tar Heels received an invite to the NCAA Tournament, where they were the number 5 national seed. They hosted and won the Chapel Hill Regional during the tournament, before losing to the Arizona Wildcats in the Chapel Hill Super Regional.

== Personnel ==
=== Roster ===
Class Listing as reflected on GoHeels.com

2026 North Carolina Tar Heels roster
Pitchers: 10 – Tom Chmielewski – Graduate; 15 – Cameron Padgett – Senior; 17 – Talan Holiday – Freshman; 19 – Camron Seagraves – Sophomore; 24 – Matthew Matthijs – Senior; 26 – Kyle Percival – Senior; 27 – Caden Glauber – Freshman; 29 – Jason DeCaro – Junior; 31 – Olin Johnson – Junior; 35 – Jackson Rose – Freshman; 36 – Folger Boaz – Junior; 39 – Jake Cackovic – Freshman; 40 – Walker McDuffie – Sophomore; 41 – Justin Mabe – Freshman; 42 – Boston Flannery – Junior; 43 – Riley Leatherman – (redshirt) Freshman; 47 – Sean Hurley – Freshman; 49 – Amos Rich – Freshman; 51 – Tim Lawson – (redshirt) Freshman; 52 – Andrew Wallen – (redshirt) Freshman; 53 – Ryan Lynch – Sophomore	Catchers: 6 – Macon Winslow – Junior; 23 – Colin Hynek – Graduate; Infielders: 1 – Cooper Nicholson – Junior; 2 – Jake Schaffner – Junior; 3 – Lee Sowers – Sophomore; 5 – Gavin Gallaher – Junior; 11 – Matt McKnight – Freshman; 20 – AJ Terry – Freshman; 44 – Erik Paulson – Junior	Outfielders: 4 – Sawyer Black – Sophomore; 7 – Perry Hargett – Sophomore; 8 – Owen Hull – Junior; 14 – Michael Maginnis – Graduate; 18 – Carter French – Senior; 28 – Jaden Nunez – Freshman; Utility: 12 – Tyler Howe (OF/INF) – Freshman; 25 – Rom Kellis V (C/INF) – Senior

=== Coaching staff ===
2026 North Carolina Tar Heels coaching staff
Name	Position	Seasons	Alma mater
Scott Forbes	Head coach	6	NC Wesleyan (1998)
Bryant Gaines	Assistant Head Coach/Pitching Coach	16	North Carolina (2011)
Jesse Wierzbicki	Assistant Coach/Hitting Coach/Infielders & Catchers	10	North Carolina (2011)
Scott Jackson	Assistant Coach/Recruiting Coordinator	10	Campbell (1998)
Jason Howell	Director of Pitching Performance, Development and Analytics	6	North Carolina (2002)
Dave Arendas	Director of Baseball Operations	21	North Carolina (1990)

== Schedule and results ==
Legend
	Win
	Loss
	Postponement
**Bold**	North Carolina team member
*	Non-Conference game
†	Make-Up Game

2026 North Carolina Tar Heels Baseball Schedule & Results (54–14–1)
Regular Season (43–10–1)
February (10–1–1)

Date	Opponent	Rank	Site/Stadium	Score	Win	Loss	Save	Attendance	Overall Record	ACC Record
February 13	Indiana*	No. 11	Boshamer Stadium; Chapel Hill, NC	**W** 9–4	**DeCaro** (1–0)	Rivera (0–1)	None	3,168	1–0	–
February 14	Indiana*	No. 11	Boshamer Stadium	**W** 12–2^{7}	**Boaz** (1–0)	Bergman (0–1)	None	3,065	2–0	–
February 14	Indiana*	No. 11	Boshamer Stadium	**W** 4–3^{11}	**Chmielewski** (1–0)	Vogel (0–1)	None	2,928	3–0	–
February 17	Richmond*	No. 10	Boshamer Stadium	**W** 10–0^{7}	**Percival** (1–0)	Gruber (0–1)	None	2,646	4–0	–
February 18	Longwood*	No. 10	Boshamer Stadium	**W** 5–3	**McDuffie** (1–0)	Chadwell (0–1)	**Matthijs** (1)	2,548	5–0	–
February 20	at East Carolina*	No. 10	Clark–LeClair Stadium; Greenville, NC	**W** 10–0^{8}	**DeCaro** (2–0)	Norby (0–1)	None	5,728	6–0	–
February 21	vs. East Carolina*	No. 10	Durham Bulls Athletic Park; Durham, NC	**L** 3–10	Jenkins (1–0)	**McDuffie** (1–1)	None	6,397	6–1	–
February 22 (Note: Game suspended in the fifth inning due to inclement weather. The game ended in a tie.)	East Carolina*	No. 10	Boshamer Stadium	**T** 3–3^{5}	None	None	None	3,200	6–1–1	–
February 24	North Carolina A&T*	No. 8	Boshamer Stadium	**W** 9–1	**Glauber** (1–0)	Bright (1–2)	None	2,284	7–1–1	–
February 25	VCU*	No. 8	Boshamer Stadium	**W** 13–3^{7}	**Rose** (1–0)	DiGiacomo (0–1)	None	2,438	8–1–1	–
February 27	Le Moyne*	No. 8	Boshamer Stadium	**W** 16–3^{7}	**DeCaro** (3–0)	Petraitis (0–2)	None	2,396	9–1–1	–
February 28	Le Moyne*	No. 8	Boshamer Stadium	**W** 12–2^{7}	**Lynch** (1–0)	Earle (0–3)	None	3,494	10–1–1	–

March (15–3)

Date	Opponent	Rank	Site/Stadium	Score	Win	Loss	Save	Attendance	Overall Record	ACC Record
March 1	Le Moyne*	No. 8	Boshamer Stadium	**W** 21–1^{7}	**Boaz** (2–0)	Canale (0–1)	None	3,233	11–1–1	–
March 3	Elon*	No. 8	Boshamer Stadium	**W** 5–1	**McDuffie** (2–1)	Winebarger (0–1)	None	2,396	12–1–1	–
March 6	Virginia	No. 8	Boshamer Stadium	**L** 3–13^{7}	Zatkowski (2–0)	**DeCaro** (3–1)	None	3,848	12–2–1	0–1
March 7	Virginia	No. 8	Boshamer Stadium	**L** 2–9	Stammel (1–0)	**Lynch** (1–1)	None	3,504	12–3–1	0–2
March 7	Virginia	No. 8	Boshamer Stadium	**W** 8–7^{12}	**Matthijs** (1–0)	Lucarelli (1–1)	None	2,283	13–3–1	1–3
March 10	Bucknell*	No. 15	Boshamer Stadium	**W** 13–3^{7}	**McDuffie** (3–1)	Hawkins (0–2)	None	2,466	14–3–1	–
March 13	at California	No. 15	Evans Diamond; Berkeley, CA	**W** 8–1	**DeCaro** (4–1)	de la Torre (1–3)	**Glauber** (1)	605	15–3–1	2–2
March 14	at California	No. 15	Evans Diamond	**W** 6–2	**Lynch** (2–1)	Foley (2–1)	None	672	16–3–1	3–2
March 15	at California	No. 15	Evans Diamond	**W** 10–2	**McDuffie** (4–1)	Eddy (3–1)	None	674	17–3–1	4–2
March 18	UNC Greensboro*	No. 14	Boshamer Stadium	**W** 8–2	**Flannery** (1–0)	Horton (0–1)	None	2,526	18–3–1	–
March 20	Louisville	No. 14	Boshamer Stadium	**W** 11–1^{8}	**DeCaro** (5–1)	Eberle (2–1)	None	2,699	19–3–1	5–2
March 21	Louisville	No. 14	Boshamer Stadium	**L** 0–2	Danilowicz (3–1)	**Lynch** (2–2)	England (4)	3,376	20–4–1	5–3
March 22	Louisville	No. 14	Boshamer Stadium	**W** 7–6	**Glauber** (2–0)	Karbowski (0–1)	**Matthijs** (2)	3,231	21–4–1	6–3
March 24	vs. South Carolina*	No. 13	Truist Field; Charlotte, NC	**W** 9–1	**McDuffie** (5–1)	Chicoli (1–2)	None	2,960	22–4–1	–
March 28	at No. 23 Notre Dame	No. 13	Frank Eck Stadium; Notre Dame, IN	**W** 6–5	**Matthijs** (2–0)	Rooney (0–2)	**Glauber** (2)	1,258	23–4–1	7–3
March 28	at No. 23 Notre Dame	No. 13	Frank Eck Stadium	**W** 13–7	**McDuffie** (6–1)	Hirsch (2–2)	None	0	24–4–1	8–3
March 29	at No. 23 Notre Dame	No. 13	Frank Eck Stadium	**W** 15–10	**Seagraves** (1–0)	Uber (4–1)	**Glauber** (3)	916	25–4–1	9–3
March 31	Campbell*	No. 6	Boshamer Stadium	**W** 5–4^{14}	**Chmielewski** (2–0)	Lugo (0–1)	None	3,140	26–4–1	10–3

April (11–5)

Date	Opponent	Rank	Site/Stadium	Score	Win	Loss	Save	Attendance	Overall Record	ACC Record
April 2	No. 22 Boston College	No. 6	Boshamer Stadium	**L** 1–6	Colarusso (3–1)	**Lynch** (2–3)	Gonzalez (2)	3,031	26–5–1	10–4
April 3	No. 22 Boston College	No. 6	Boshamer Stadium	**W** 5–2	**Glauber** (3–0)	Mudd (2–3)	**McDuffie** (1)	3,381	26–5–1	11–4
April 4	No. 22 Boston College	No. 6	Boshamer Stadium	**W** 8–7	**Rose** (2–0)	Kipp (0–2)	**McDuffie** (2)	3,259	27–5–1	12–4
April 7	Charlotte*	No. 5	Boshamer Stadium	**W** 8–4	**Seagraves** (2–0)	Carson (2–1)	None	4,289	28–5–1	–
April 10	Clemson	No. 5	Doug Kingsmore Stadium; Clemson, SC	**L** 5–9	Knaak (2–3)	**DeCaro** (5–2)	Simmerson (3)	5,345	28–6–1	12–5
April 11	Clemson	No. 5	Doug Kingsmore Stadium	**W** 6–4^{14}	**Glauber** (4–0)	Harrison (2–2)	None	5,188	29–6–1	13–5
April 12	Clemson	No. 5	Boshamer Stadium	**W** 12–5	**Boaz** (3–0)	Titsworth (3–3)	None	4,467	30–6–1	14–5
April 14	UNC Wilmington*	No. 3	Boshamer Stadium	**W** 14–5	**Rose** (3–0)	Sobol (0–3)	None	3,161	31–6–1	–
April 17	No. 2 Georgia Tech	No. 3	Boshamer Stadium	**W** 5–2	**DeCaro** (6–2)	McKee (6–1)	**McDuffie** (3)	4,357	32–6–1	15–5
April 18	No. 2 Georgia Tech	No. 3	Boshamer Stadium	**W** 14–4^{8}	**Lynch** (3–3)	Buursema (0–2)	None	3,604	33–6–1	16–5
April 19	No. 2 Georgia Tech	No. 3	Boshamer Stadium	**L** 2–5	Gaudette (4–0)	**Boaz** (3–1)	Patel (4)	3,759	33–7–1	16–6
April 21	High Point*	No. 2	Boshamer Stadium	**W** 9–2	**Glauber** (5–0)	Silverstein (0–3)	None	3,279	34–7–1	–
April 23	at Duke	No. 2	Jack Coombs Field; Durham, NC	**W** 3–1	**DeCaro** (7–1)	Weaver (4–6)	**McDuffie** (4)	1,202	35–7–1	17–6
April 24	at Duke	No. 2	Jack Coombs Field	**L** 1–3	Lemke (2–4)	**Lynch** (3–4)	Dean (1)	1,716	35–8–1	17–7
April 25	at Duke	No. 2	Jack Coombs Field	**W** 22–5^{7}	**Glauber** (6–0)	Leon (2–3)	None	1,750	36–8–1	18–7
April 28	No. 9 Coastal Carolina*	No. 2	Boshamer Stadium	**L** 2–12	Parker (2–0)	**McDuffie** (6–2)	None	4,405	36–9–1	–
April 29	Queens*	No. 2	Boshamer Stadium	**Canceled**						

May (7–1)

Date	Opponent	Rank	Site/Stadium	Score	Win	Loss	Save	Attendance	Overall Record	ACC Record
May 3	Duke	No. 2	Boshamer Stadium	**W** 13–0^{7}	**DeCaro** (8–2)	Lemke (2–5)	None	4,004	37–9–1	19–7
May 6	Winthrop*	No. 2	Boshamer Stadium	**Canceled**						
May 8	Pittsburgh	No. 2	Boshamer Stadium	**W** 4–1	**DeCaro** (9–2)	Doganiero (5–4)	**Glauber** (4)	3,493	38–9–1	20–7
May 9	Pittsburgh	No. 2	Boshamer Stadium	**W** 12–2^{8}	**Lynch** (4–4)	Reiter (0–1)	None	3,262	39–9–1	21–7
May 10	Pittsburgh	No. 2	Boshamer Stadium	**W** 7–3	**Glauber** (7–0)	Lafferty (4–4)	**Rose** (1)	3,140	40–9–1	22–7
May 12	at UNC Wilmington*	No. 2	Brooks Field; Wilmington, NC	**W** 13–7	**Matthijs** (3–0)	Thornton (3–3)	**Chmielewski** (1)	3,010	41–9–1	–
May 14	at NC State	No. 2	Doak Field; Raleigh, NC	**W** 9–4	**DeCaro** (10–2)	Andrews (3–4)	**McDuffie** (5)	2,918	42–9–1	23–7
May 15	at NC State	No. 2	Doak Field	**W** 17–7^{7}	**Glauber** (8–0)	Consiglio (3–4)	None	3,238	43–9–1	24–7
May 16	at NC State	No. 2	Doak Field	**L** 2–7	Nance (4–2)	**Boaz** (3–2)	None	3,094	43–10–1	24–8

Postseason (11–4)
ACC Tournament (2–1)

Date	Opponent	Rank	Site/Stadium	Score	Win	Loss	Save	Attendance	Overall Record	ACCT Record
May 22	vs. (7) Virginia Tech	(2) No. 2	Truist Field	**W** 10–4	**Glauber** (9–0)	Stieg (2–5)	None	0	44–10–1	1–0
May 23	vs. (14) Pitt	(2) No. 2	Truist Field	**W** 13–5	**McDuffie** (7–2)	Doganiero (6–5)	None	6,313	45–10–1	2–0
May 24	vs. No. 3 (1) Georgia Tech	(2) No. 2	Truist Field	**L** 6–13	Gaudette (6–1)	**Boaz** (3–3)	None	8,574	45–11–1	2–1

NCAA Tournament: Chapel Hill Regional (3–0)

Date	Opponent	Rank	Site/Stadium	Score	Win	Loss	Save	Attendance	Overall Record	NCAAT Record
May 29	vs. (4) VCU	(1) No. 4	Boshamer Stadium	**W** 8–0	**Lynch** (5–4)	Steitz (7–4)	None	3,982	46–11–1	1–0
May 30	vs. (3) East Carolina	(1) No. 4	Boshamer Stadium	**W** 7–5	**Glauber** (10–0)	Hoagland (0–3)	**McDuffie** (6)	4,254	47–11–1	2–0
May 31	vs. (3) East Carolina	(1) No. 4	Boshamer Stadium	**W** 9–3	**Rose** (4–0)	Towers (7–4)	None	4,022	48–11–1	3–0

NCAA Tournament: Chapel Hill Super Regional (2–1)

Date	Opponent	Rank	Site/Stadium	Score	Win	Loss	Save	Attendance	Overall Record	NCAAT Record
June 5	vs. USC	(5) No. 4	Boshamer Stadium	**L** 5–9	Herrell (6–4)	**McDuffie** (7–3)	Johnson (1)	3,847	48–12–1	0–1
June 6	vs. USC	(5) No. 4	Boshamer Stadium	**W** 4–0	**DeCaro** (11–2)	Govel (10–3)	None	3,951	49–12–1	1–1
June 7	vs. USC	(5) No. 4	Boshamer Stadium	**W** 4–3	**McDuffie** (8–3)	Herrell (6–5)	None	3,913	50–12–1	2–1

NCAA Tournament: College World Series (4–2)

Date	Opponent	Rank	Site/Stadium	Score	Win	Loss	Save	Attendance	Overall Record	NCAAT Record
June 12	vs. No. 18 Ole Miss	(5) No. 4	Charles Schwab Field; Omaha, NE	**W** 6–2	**Glauber** (11–0)	Calhoun (5–4)	None	24,883	51–12–1	1–0
June 14	vs. (16) No. 9 West Virginia	(5) No. 4	Charles Schwab Field	**W** 5–2	**McDuffie** (9–3)	Yehl (9–3)	**Glauber** (5)	24,414	52–12–1	2–0
June 17	vs. (16) No. 9 West Virginia	(5) No. 4	Charles Schwab Field	**W** 12–7	**Rose** (5–0)	Cole (10–2)	None	23,572	53–12–1	3–0
June 20	vs. Oklahoma	(5) No. 4	Charles Schwab Field	**L** 3–9	Rager (7–3)	**DeCaro** (11–3)	None	24,707	53–13–1	3–1
June 21	vs. Oklahoma	(5) No. 4	Charles Schwab Field	**W** 6–2	**Glauber** (12–0)	X. Mercurius (1–3)	None	24,621	54–13–1	4–1
June 22	vs. Oklahoma	(5) No. 4	Charles Schwab Field	**L** 2–13	L. Mercuruius (7–7)	**Rose** (5–1)	None	23,248	54–14–1	4–2

=== Chapel Hill Super Regional ===
Hosted by North Carolina at Boshamer Stadium

Regional	Regional
**1**	**North Carolina**	**8**
4	VCU	0
**1**	**North Carolina**	**7**
3	East Carolina	5
**3**	**East Carolina**	**7^{14}**
2	Tennessee	3
Chapel Hill Regional – Boshamer Stadium
2	Tennessee	4
**4**	**VCU**	**5**
4	VCU	0
**3**	**East Carolina**	**10**
**1**	**Texas A&M**	**7**
4	Lamar	5
**1**	**Texas A&M**	**17**
3	Texas State	2
**3**	**Texas State**	**5**
2	USC	4
College Station Regional – Olsen Field at Blue Bell Park
4	Lamar	6
**2**	**USC**	**19**
**2**	**USC**	**15**
3	Texas State	4

Regional Final
**1**	**North Carolina**	**9**	–
3	East Carolina	3	–
1	Texas A&M	3	1
**2**	**USC**	**14**	**7**

Super Regional; June 5–7
**5**	**North Carolina**	5	**4**	**4**
USC	**9**	0	3

== Rankings ==
Ranking movements Legend: ██ Increase in ranking ██ Decrease in ranking
	Week																	
Poll	Pre	1	2	3	4	5	6	7	8	9	10	11	12	13	14	15	16	Final
Coaches'	8	8*	8	6	14	10	12	6	5	3	2	2	2	2	2	4	4*	2
Baseball America	7	6	7	7	11	11	11	7	6	3	2	2	2	2	3	3*	3*	2
NCBWA†	12	9	8	6	12	9	9	6	5	3	2	2	2	2	3	3*	2	2
D1Baseball	11	10	8	8	15	14	13	6	6	3	2	2	2	2	2	4	4*	2
Perfect Game	18	17	17	11	20	15	14	8	6	3	2	2	2	2	2	2*	2*	2

† NCBWA ranks 30 teams in their preseason poll, but only ranks 25 teams weekly during the season.
* A new poll was not released for this week, so for comparison purposes, the previous week's ranking is inserted in this week's slot.
