= Mike Neu (baseball) =

American baseball player (born 1978)

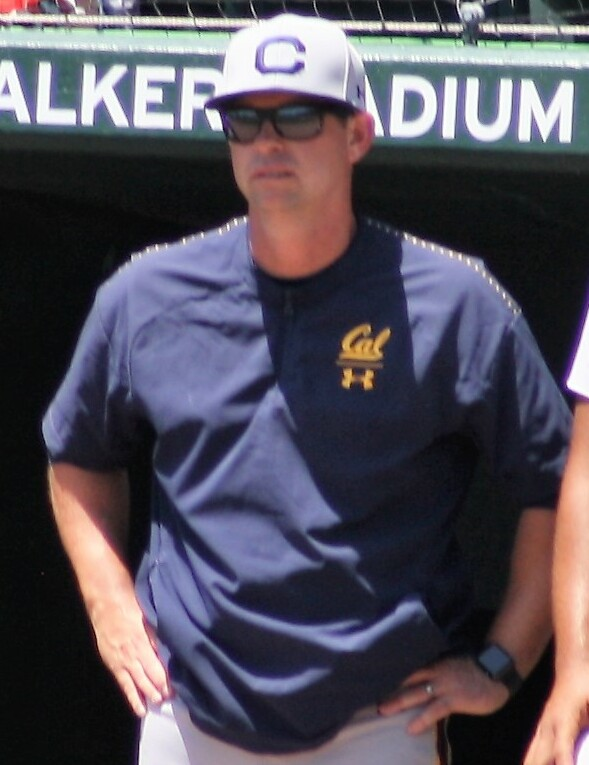
- Neu in 2019

California Golden Bears
- Pitcher
- Born: March 9, 1978 (age 48); Napa, California, U.S.
- Batted: Switch Threw: Right

MLB debut
- April 9, 2003, for the Oakland Athletics

Last MLB appearance
- June 11, 2004, for the Florida Marlins

MLB statistics
- Win–loss record: 0–0
- Earned run average: 3.72
- Strikeouts: 22
- Stats at Baseball Reference

Teams
- Oakland Athletics (2003); Florida Marlins (2004)

Michael David Neu (born March 9, 1978) is an American college baseball coach and former pitcher who is the current head baseball coach of the California Golden Bears. Neu played college baseball at the University of Miami for coach Jim Morris from 1997 to 1999 and played professionally in Major League Baseball (MLB) from 2003 to 2004. He has also served as the head coach for the Pacific Tigers from 2016 to 2017.

== Early life and college career ==
Raised in Napa, California, Neu attended Vintage High School where he set Monticello Empire League records for career wins (21) and strikeouts (196). As a senior in 1996, he was first-team All-State, All-Region and MEL Player of the Year with a 10–1 record, a 0.64 ERA and 121 strikeouts in 77.0 innings. Neu was also MEL Player of the Year as a junior.

As a player at the University of Miami, Neu had a stellar 1999 campaign and helped the Hurricanes capture the College World Series title with a 6–5 victory over Florida State University in the championship game. He finished the year 3–1 with a 2.94 ERA and tallied 110 strikeouts in 67.0 innings, earning Collegiate Baseball All-America honors. Neu led the nation in strikeouts per nine innings (14.8) and was selected to the All-College World Series team with three saves and appearances in all four of Miami's games at the CWS. Neu had transferred to Miami from Sacramento City College wherein 1998 he was the Northern California Pitcher of the Year, the Bay Valley Conference Pitcher of the Year, and a Junior College All-American while going 15–0 with a 1.44 ERA and 139 strikeouts in 108.0 innings. He was named MVP of the 1998 Cal State Championship Final Four after throwing 11.0 innings with no earned runs and notching a win and a save in the state tournament. In 1998 and 1999, he played collegiate summer baseball with the Brewster Whitecaps of the Cape Cod Baseball League.

Neu earned a master's degree in physical education from Ball State University in 2011.

== Playing career ==
Drafted out of the University of Miami in the 29th round of the 1999 Major League Baseball draft by the Cincinnati Reds, Neu spent 4 years in the Reds' organization making his way up to Triple-A, before he was claimed in the 2002 Rule 5 draft by the Oakland Athletics. Neu played 32 games for the Athletics in 2003 and had a 3.64 ERA. On December 13, 2003, he was traded to the Florida Marlins with Bill Murphy for Mark Redman. In 2004, Neu played for the Triple-A Albuquerque Isotopes, but struggled with a 6.57 ERA. In spring training 2005, he was released by the Marlins and on April 6, he signed with the Los Angeles Dodgers. Due to injuries, Neu did not appear in an MLB game for the Dodgers and became a free agent after the season.

== Coaching career ==
Neu was the head baseball coach at Diablo Valley College (DVC) from 2009 to 2011, leading his team to an 87–41 mark (.680) with two Big 8 Conference titles in three years. His 2011 squad was ranked No. 1 in Northern California and his pitching staff led all the California Community Colleges with a 2.13 team ERA. Prior to taking over the reins at DVC, Neu was the team's pitching coach for two seasons. Additionally, he spent time as an associate scout for both the Kansas City Royals and the Atlanta Braves before moving into the coaching ranks.

In four seasons as the pitching coach at the University of California, Berkeley from 2012 to 2015, Neu helped shape the Bears' pitching staff into one of the stronger units in the Pac-12 Conference as the Bears finished fourth in the conference in ERA in 2015 with a team ERA of just 3.03. With Neu's pitchers leading the way, the Bears pushed their way into the top-25 during the year and made their way to the finals of the Texas A&M Regional in the NCAA tournament.

Neu left Cal to become head coach at the University of the Pacific in Stockton, California, where he served for two seasons. On July 5, 2017, Neu was named head coach at Cal, taking over for the 2018 season.

=== Head coaching record ===
Record table
Season	Team	Overall	Conference	Standing	Postseason
Pacific Tigers (West Coast Conference) (2016–2017)
2016	Pacific	22–30	12–15	6th	
2017	Pacific	18–35	6–21	9th	
Pacific:		40–65	18–36		
California Golden Bears (Pac-12 Conference) (2018–2024)
2018	California	32–22	16–14	5th	
2019	California	32–20	17–11	4th	NCAA Regional
2020	California	5–11	0–0		Season canceled due to COVID-19
2021	California	29–26	15–15	7th	
2022	California	29–27	14–16	7th	
2023	California	24–28	12–18	T–8th	
2024	California	34–18	17-13	T–5th	Pac-12 Tournament
California:		185–152	91–87		
California Golden Bears (Atlantic Coast Conference) (2025–present)
2025	California	26–32	9–21	16th	ACC Tournament
2026	California	29–26	12–18	13th	ACC Tournament
California:		240–210	21–39		
Total:		280–275			
National champion Postseason invitational champion Conference regular season champion Conference regular season and conference tournament champion Division regular season champion Division regular season and conference tournament champion Conference tournament champion

== Personal life ==
Neu has a wife, Nicole, and two sons; Damon and Maddax.

== See also ==
- List of current NCAA Division I baseball coaches
