= 2026 Atlantic Coast Conference baseball tournament =

American college baseball tournament

- Teams: 16
- Format: Single Elimination
- Finals site: Truist Field; Charlotte, North Carolina
- Champions: Georgia Tech (10th title)
- Winning coach: James Ramsey (1st title)
- MVP: Ryan Zuckerman (Georgia Tech)
- Television: ACC Network

2026 Atlantic Coast Conference baseball standings
	Conf.						Overall
Team	W		L		T	PCT	W		L		T	PCT
No. 10 Georgia Tech ‍†‍‡‍^{y}	25	–	5	–	0	.833	50	–	11	–	0	.820
No. 2 North Carolina ‍‍‍^{y}	22	–	8	–	0	.733	54	–	14	–	1	.790
No. 18 Florida State ‍‍‍^{y}	19	–	11	–	0	.633	40	–	19	–	0	.678
Boston College ‍‍‍^{y}	17	–	13	–	0	.567	40	–	24	–	0	.625
Wake Forest ‍‍‍^{y}	16	–	14	–	0	.533	39	–	21	–	0	.650
Miami (FL) ‍‍‍^{y}	16	–	14	–	0	.533	39	–	20	–	0	.661
Virginia Tech ‍‍‍^{y}	15	–	15	–	0	.500	30	–	26	–	0	.536
Virginia ‍‍‍^{y}	14	–	16	–	0	.467	37	–	23	–	0	.617
NC State ‍‍‍^{y}	14	–	16	–	0	.467	32	–	24	–	0	.571
Louisville ‍‍‍	13	–	17	–	0	.433	30	–	27	–	0	.526
Notre Dame ‍‍‍	13	–	17	–	0	.433	31	–	22	–	0	.585
Stanford ‍‍‍	13	–	17	–	0	.433	28	–	26	–	0	.519
California ‍‍‍	12	–	18	–	0	.400	29	–	26	–	0	.527
Pittsburgh ‍‍‍	11	–	19	–	0	.367	33	–	24	–	0	.579
Clemson ‍‍‍	10	–	20	–	0	.333	31	–	26	–	0	.544
Duke ‍‍‍	10	–	20	–	0	.333	26	–	31	–	0	.456
† – Conference champion ‡ – Tournament champion y – Invited to the NCAA Tournament; As of June 23, 2026; Rankings from D1Baseball

The 2026 Atlantic Coast Conference baseball tournament was held May 19–24, 2026 at Truist Field in Charlotte, North Carolina. The annual tournament determined the conference champion of the NCAA Division I Atlantic Coast Conference for college baseball in the 2026 season.

The tournament has been held every year but two since 1973, with Clemson winning eleven championships prior to this, the most all-time. Georgia Tech won its tenth championship, defeating defending champion North Carolina, who have won nine championships. Florida State has won eight titles since its entry to the league in 1992. Recent entrants Virginia Tech, Boston College, Pittsburgh, Notre Dame and Louisville have never won the event.

== Seeding ==
All of the sixteen teams that participated in the 2026 season qualified for the tournament. Seeds one through four were awarded a bye into the Quarterfinals, while seeds five through eight received a bye into the Second Round. Ties were broken based on tiebreaking procedures described below.

Team	W	L	Pct.	GB	Seed	Tiebreaker
Georgia Tech	25	5	.833	-	1	
North Carolina	22	8	.733	3	2	
Florida State	19	11	.633	6	3	
Boston College	17	13	.567	8	4	
Miami	16	14	.533	9	5	2–1 against WF
Wake Forest	16	14	.533	9	6	1–2 against MIA
Virginia Tech	15	15	.500	10	7	
Virginia	14	16	.467	11	8	2–1 against UNC
NC State	14	16	.467	11	9	1–2 against UNC
Notre Dame	13	17	.433	12	10	4–2 against LOU and STAN
Louisville	13	17	.433	12	11	3–3 against ND and STAN
Stanford	13	17	.433	12	12	2–4 against ND and LOU
California	12	18	.400	13	13	
Pitt	11	19	.367	14	14	
Clemson	10	20	.333	15	15	1–2 against GT
Duke	10	20	.333	15	16	0–3 against GT

== Schedule and Results ==
=== Bracket ===
First Round
9	NC State	12
16	Duke	21
12	Stanford	11
13	California	4
10	Notre Dame	5
15	Clemson	4
11	Louisville	8
14	Pitt	16

Second Round
8	Virginia	6
16	Duke	4
5	Miami	11
12	Stanford	2
7	Virginia Tech	17
10	Notre Dame	10
6	Wake Forest	4
14	Pitt	7

Quarterfinals
1	Georgia Tech	16
8	Virginia	10
4	Boston College	2
5	Miami	8
2	North Carolina	10
7	Virginia Tech	4
3	Florida State	6
14	Pitt	8

Semifinals
1	Georgia Tech	9
5	Miami	3
2	North Carolina	13
14	Pitt	5

Final
1	Georgia Tech	13
2	North Carolina	6

=== Schedule ===
Game	Time*	Matchup^{#}	Score	Television	Attendance	Reference
Tuesday, May 19
1	9:00 a.m.	No. 16 Duke vs. No. 9 NC State	21–12	ACCN	2,296	
2	1:00 p.m.	No. 13 California vs. No. 12 Stanford	4–11	ACCN	2,455	
3	5:00 p.m.	No. 15 Clemson vs. No. 10 Notre Dame	4–5	ACCN	3,721	
4	9:00 p.m.	No. 14 Pittsburgh vs. No. 11 Louisville	16–8	ACCN	2,943	
Wednesday, May 20
5	9:00 a.m.	No. 16 Duke vs. No. 8 Virginia	4–6	ACCN	1,186	
6	1:00 p.m.	No. 12 Stanford vs. No. 5 Miami	2–11	ACCN	3,588	
7	5:00 p.m.	No. 10 Notre Dame vs. No. 7 Virginia Tech	10–17	ACCN	3,913	
8	9:00 p.m.	No. 14 Pittsburgh vs. No. 6 Wake Forest	7–4	ACCN	4,409	
Thursday, May 21
9	11:00 a.m.	No. 8 Virginia vs. No. 1 Georgia Tech	10–16	ACCN	2,906	
10	3:00 p.m.	No. 5 Miami vs. No. 4 Boston College	8–2	ACCN	3,014	
Friday, May 22
11	11:00 a.m.	No. 7 Virginia Tech vs. No. 2 North Carolina	4–10	ACCN		
12	3:00 p.m.	No. 14 Pittsburgh vs. No. 3 Florida State	8–6	ACCN		
Saturday, May 23
13	11:00 a.m.	No. 1 Georgia Tech vs. No. 5 Miami	9–3	ACCN		
14	3:00 p.m.	No. 2 North Carolina vs. No. 14 Pittsburgh	13–5	ACCN		
Championship – Sunday, May 24
Championship	12:00 p.m.	No. 1 Georgia Tech vs. No. 2 North Carolina	13–6	ESPN2		
*Game times in EDT. # – Rankings denote tournament seed.

=== Game Summaries ===
==== First Round ====
May 19; 9:00 a.m. ET; Game 1	(16) Duke	21–12	(9) NC State	Truist Field; Attendance: 2,296; Umpires: HP: Brian deBrauwere, 1B: Tim Rosso, 2B: Brandon Cooper, 3B: Brian Miller
May 19; 9:00 a.m. ET; Game 1	WP: Sammy Petrocelli (1–0)	Boxscore	LP: Ryder Garino (3–5)	Truist Field; Attendance: 2,296; Umpires: HP: Brian deBrauwere, 1B: Tim Rosso, 2B: Brandon Cooper, 3B: Brian Miller
May 19; 9:00 a.m. ET; Game 1	HR: K. Smith 2 (13)	Boxscore	HR: D. Bargo (7), T. Head (14), L. Nixon (9), W. Peifer (1)	Truist Field; Attendance: 2,296; Umpires: HP: Brian deBrauwere, 1B: Tim Rosso, 2B: Brandon Cooper, 3B: Brian Miller

May 19; 1:00 p.m. ET; Game 2	(13) California	4–11	(12) Stanford	Truist Field; Attendance: 2,455; Umpires: HP: Travis Godec, 1B: Brandon Henson, 2B: Joe Blumenauer, 3B: Linus Baker
May 19; 1:00 p.m. ET; Game 2	LP: Otto Espinoza (2–3)	Boxscore	WP: Aidan Keenan (1–3)	Truist Field; Attendance: 2,455; Umpires: HP: Travis Godec, 1B: Brandon Henson, 2B: Joe Blumenauer, 3B: Linus Baker
May 19; 1:00 p.m. ET; Game 2	HR: H. Prather (14), E. Kodama (1)	Boxscore	HR: J. Nati (8), C. Bates (9)	Truist Field; Attendance: 2,455; Umpires: HP: Travis Godec, 1B: Brandon Henson, 2B: Joe Blumenauer, 3B: Linus Baker

May 19; 5:00 p.m. ET; Game 3	(15) Clemson	4–5	(10) Notre Dame	Truist Field; Attendance: 3,721; Umpires: HP: Jose Matamoros, 1B: Jon Byrne, 2B: Ryan Clark, 3B: Travis Carlson
May 19; 5:00 p.m. ET; Game 3	LP: Michael Sharman (6–2)	Boxscore	WP: Jack Radel (8–3); Sv: Noah Rooney (6)	Truist Field; Attendance: 3,721; Umpires: HP: Jose Matamoros, 1B: Jon Byrne, 2B: Ryan Clark, 3B: Travis Carlson
May 19; 5:00 p.m. ET; Game 3	HR: T. Lichtenberger (2), B. Clavon (5), J. Jarrell (18)	Boxscore	HR: D. Berkland (16), B. Watters (10), J. Lee (13)	Truist Field; Attendance: 3,721; Umpires: HP: Jose Matamoros, 1B: Jon Byrne, 2B: Ryan Clark, 3B: Travis Carlson

May 19; 9:00 p.m. ET; Game 4	(14) Pittsburgh	16–8	(11) Louisville	Truist Field; Attendance: 2,943; Umpires: HP: Brandon Henson, 1B: Joe Blumenauer, 2B: Linus Baker, 3B: Travis Godec
May 19; 9:00 p.m. ET; Game 4	WP: David Leslie (3–5)	Boxscore	LP: Wyatt Danilowicz (4–3)	Truist Field; Attendance: 2,943; Umpires: HP: Brandon Henson, 1B: Joe Blumenauer, 2B: Linus Baker, 3B: Travis Godec
May 19; 9:00 p.m. ET; Game 4	HR: T. Fenderson 2 (6), M. Ligenza (5)	Boxscore		Truist Field; Attendance: 2,943; Umpires: HP: Brandon Henson, 1B: Joe Blumenauer, 2B: Linus Baker, 3B: Travis Godec

==== Second Round ====
May 20; 9:00 a.m. ET; Game 5	(16) Duke	4–6	(8) Virginia	Truist Field; Attendance: 1,186; Umpires: HP: Jon Byrne, 1B: Ryan Clark, 2B: Travis Carlson, 3B: Jose Matamoros
May 20; 9:00 a.m. ET; Game 5	LP: Aidan Weaver (4–9)	Boxscore	WP: Henry Zatowski (8–1); Sv: Lucas Hartman (1)	Truist Field; Attendance: 1,186; Umpires: HP: Jon Byrne, 1B: Ryan Clark, 2B: Travis Carlson, 3B: Jose Matamoros
May 20; 9:00 a.m. ET; Game 5	HR: T. Albright (4)	Boxscore	HR: J. Weatherspoon (5)	Truist Field; Attendance: 1,186; Umpires: HP: Jon Byrne, 1B: Ryan Clark, 2B: Travis Carlson, 3B: Jose Matamoros

May 20; 1:00 p.m. ET; Game 6	(12) Stanford	2–11	(5) Miami	Truist Field; Attendance: 3,588; Umpires: HP: Joseph Blumenauer, 1B: Linus Baker, 2B: Travis Godec, 3B: Brandon Henson
May 20; 1:00 p.m. ET; Game 6	LP: Andrew Shaw (1–1)	Boxscore	WP: Rob Evans (10–3)	Truist Field; Attendance: 3,588; Umpires: HP: Joseph Blumenauer, 1B: Linus Baker, 2B: Travis Godec, 3B: Brandon Henson
May 20; 1:00 p.m. ET; Game 6	HR: T. Tokheim (1)	Boxscore	HR: A. Alonzo (2)	Truist Field; Attendance: 3,588; Umpires: HP: Joseph Blumenauer, 1B: Linus Baker, 2B: Travis Godec, 3B: Brandon Henson

May 20; 5:00 p.m. ET; Game 7	(10) Notre Dame	10–17	(7) Virginia Tech	Truist Field; Attendance: 3,913; Umpires: HP: Tim Rosso, 1B: Brandon Cooper, 2B: Brian Miller, 3B: Brian deBrauwere
May 20; 5:00 p.m. ET; Game 7	LP: Ty Uber (4–3)	Boxscore	WP: Logan Eisenreich (2–2)	Truist Field; Attendance: 3,913; Umpires: HP: Tim Rosso, 1B: Brandon Cooper, 2B: Brian Miller, 3B: Brian deBrauwere
May 20; 5:00 p.m. ET; Game 7	HR: M. Quatrani (15), J. Zee (5)	Boxscore	HR: E. Ball 2 (15),	Truist Field; Attendance: 3,913; Umpires: HP: Tim Rosso, 1B: Brandon Cooper, 2B: Brian Miller, 3B: Brian deBrauwere

May 20; 9:00 p.m. ET; Game 8	(14) Pittsburgh	7–4	(6) Wake Forest	Truist Field; Attendance: 4,409; Umpires: HP: Ryan Clark, 1B: Travis Carlson, 2B: Jose Matamoro, 3B: Jon Byrne
May 20; 9:00 p.m. ET; Game 8	WP: Drew Lafferty (5–4); Sv: Eddie Smink (5)	Boxscore	LP: Rhys Bowie (1–3)	Truist Field; Attendance: 4,409; Umpires: HP: Ryan Clark, 1B: Travis Carlson, 2B: Jose Matamoro, 3B: Jon Byrne
May 20; 9:00 p.m. ET; Game 8		Boxscore	HR: D. Wentz (17)	Truist Field; Attendance: 4,409; Umpires: HP: Ryan Clark, 1B: Travis Carlson, 2B: Jose Matamoro, 3B: Jon Byrne

==== Quarterfinals ====
May 21; 11:00 a.m. ET; Game 9	(8) Virginia	10–16	(1) Georgia Tech	Truist Field; Attendance: 2,906; Umpires: HP: Brandon Cooper, 1B: Brian Miller, 2B: Brian deBrauwere, 3B: Tim Rosso
May 21; 11:00 a.m. ET; Game 9	LP: Max Stammel (3–5)	Boxscore	WP: Mason Pate; (4–0)	Truist Field; Attendance: 2,906; Umpires: HP: Brandon Cooper, 1B: Brian Miller, 2B: Brian deBrauwere, 3B: Tim Rosso
May 21; 11:00 a.m. ET; Game 9	HR: J. Tiroly (14), H. Didawick (9), A. Perrotta (5)	Boxscore	HR: C. Kerce 2 (10), V. Lackey 2 (17), P. Brosius (10)	Truist Field; Attendance: 2,906; Umpires: HP: Brandon Cooper, 1B: Brian Miller, 2B: Brian deBrauwere, 3B: Tim Rosso

May 21; 3:00 p.m. ET; Game 10	(5) Miami	8–2	(4) Boston College	Truist Field; Attendance: 3,014; Umpires: HP: Jose Matamoros, 1B: Jon Byrne, 2B: Travis Carlson, 3B: Ryan Clark
May 21; 3:00 p.m. ET; Game 10	WP: Lazaro Collera (4–3)		LP: A.J. Colarusso (5–4)	Truist Field; Attendance: 3,014; Umpires: HP: Jose Matamoros, 1B: Jon Byrne, 2B: Travis Carlson, 3B: Ryan Clark
May 21; 3:00 p.m. ET; Game 10	HR: A. Sosa (17), F. Peralta (1)			Truist Field; Attendance: 3,014; Umpires: HP: Jose Matamoros, 1B: Jon Byrne, 2B: Travis Carlson, 3B: Ryan Clark

May 22; 11:00 a.m. ET; Game 11	(7) Virginia Tech	4–10	(2) North Carolina	Truist Field; Umpires: HP: Brian deBrauwere, 1B: Brian Miller, 2B: Tim Rosso, 3B: Brandon Cooper
May 22; 11:00 a.m. ET; Game 11	LP: Griffin Stieg (2–5)		WP: Caden Glauber (9–0)	Truist Field; Umpires: HP: Brian deBrauwere, 1B: Brian Miller, 2B: Tim Rosso, 3B: Brandon Cooper
May 22; 11:00 a.m. ET; Game 11	HR: E. Gibson (7), H. Cooke (8), E. Ball (16)		HR: M. Winslow (10)	Truist Field; Umpires: HP: Brian deBrauwere, 1B: Brian Miller, 2B: Tim Rosso, 3B: Brandon Cooper

May 22; 3:00 p.m. ET; Game 12	(14) Pittsburgh	8–6	(3) Florida State	Truist Field; Umpires: HP: , 1B: , 2B: , 3B:

==== Semifinals ====
May 23; 11:00 a.m. ET; Game 13	(1) Georgia Tech	9–3	(5) Miami	Truist Field; Umpires: HP: , 1B: , 2B: , 3B:

May 23; 3:00 p.m. ET; Game 14	(2) North Carolina	13–5	(14) Pittsburgh	Truist Field; Umpires: HP: , 1B: , 2B: , 3B:

==== Championship game ====
ACC Championship
No. 2 North Carolina	vs.	No. 1 Georgia Tech

May 24, 2026 12:00 p.m. (EDT) at Truist Field in Charlotte, North Carolina
Team	1	2	3	4	5	6	7	8	9	R	H	E
No. 2 North Carolina	1	0	0	2	2	0	1	0	0	6	8	1
No. 1 Georgia Tech	0	1	5	0	0	2	3	2	X	13	14	2

== All Tournament Team ==
Position	Player	Team
1B	Kent Schmidt	Georgia Tech
2B	Trey Fenderson	Pitt
SS	Jake Schaffner	North Carolina
**3B**	**Ryan Zuckerman**	**Georgia Tech**
C	Vahn Lackey	Georgia Tech
DH	Kaden Smith	Duke
OF	Owen Hull	North Carolina
OF	Drew Burress	Georgia Tech
OF	Rom Kellis	North Carolina
P	David Leslie	Pitt
P	Jack Radel	Notre Dame

MVP in bold.
