= 2026 NC State Wolfpack baseball team =

2026 NCAA Division I baseball season of the NC State Wolfpack

Seasons

The 2026 NC State Wolfpack baseball team represents North Carolina State University in the 2026 NCAA Division I baseball season. The Wolfpack play their home games at Doak Field under 30th-year head coach Elliott Avent. They compete as members of the Atlantic Division of the Atlantic Coast Conference (ACC).

The Wolfpack entered the season coming off an appearance in the 2024 College World Series and a regional final appearance in 2025. Following a regular season marked by major pitching injuries and shifting roster adjustments, NC State finished the regular season 32–21 overall and 14–16 in ACC play. They capped off their regular season with a crucial 7–2 victory over No. 2 rival North Carolina to cement the No. 9 seed in the ACC Tournament.

== Preseason ==
In the preseason, NC State was highly regarded by national publications, checking in at No. 17 in the initial D1Baseball rankings. The season marked the historic 30th year at the helm for head coach Elliott Avent, who signed an extension in 2020 running through the 2026 campaign.

== Roster ==
2026 NC State Wolfpack roster
#	Player	Position	Bats/Throws	Class	Hometown	High School / Previous School
0	Luke Nixon	INF	L/R	Jr.	Wilmington, NC	New Hanover HS
1	Rett Johnson	OF	L/R	Fr.	Youngsville, NC	East Carolina Academy
2	Mikey Ryan	INF	R/R	So.	Luling, LA	Rummel HS
3	Christian Serrano	INF	R/R	Fr.	Fuquay-Varina, NC	Pro5 Baseball Academy
5	Sherman Johnson	INF/C	R/R	Jr.	Loganville, GA	Loganville HS
6	Dalton Bargo	UTL	L/R	Sr.	Omaha, NE	Westside HS
7	Brayden Fraasman	OF	R/R	Sr.	Okeana, OH	Ross HS
8	Ryder Garino	RHP	R/R	So.	Cherry Hill, NJ	Cherry Hill West HS
10	Truitt Manuel	RHP	R/R	R-Fr.	Fletcher, NC	West Henderson HS
11	Preston Bonn	C	L/R	R-Fr.	Lawrenceville, GA	Brookwood HS
13	Andrew Wiggins	OF	L/R	Jr.	Indianapolis, IN	Heritage Christian HS
14	Ty Head	OF	L/R	So.	Windermere, FL	Windermere HS
15	Drew Lanphere	C	R/R	Jr.	Donelson, TN	Donelson Christian Academy
16	Collins Black	RHP	R/R	So.	Charlotte, NC	Myers Park HS
17	Sam Harris	RHP	R/R	Fr.	Cary, NC	Broughton HS
18	Wyatt Peifer	INF	R/R	Sr.	Boyertown, PA	Boyertown Area HS
19	Heath Andrews	RHP	R/R	Jr.	Raleigh, NC	Sporting Goods Academy
20	Ryan Marohn	LHP	L/L	Jr.	Chantilly, VA	Freedom HS
22	Luke Hemric	LHP	R/L	Fr.	Apex, NC	Apex Friendship HS
23	Vincent DeCarlo	C	R/R	Fr.	Tampa, FL	Jesuite HS
24	Devin Mitchell	OF	R/R	Jr.	Edmond, OK	Edmond Santa Fe HS
25	Danny Heintz	RHP	R/R	Gr.	Cary, NC	Green Hope HS
27	Chris McHugh	INF	R/R	Jr.	Enfield, NY	Commack HS
28	Cooper Consiglio	LHP	L/L	Jr.	Palm Harbor, FL	IMG Academy
29	Julien Peissel	RHP	R/R	R-Jr.	Hickory, NC	Saint Stephens HS
30	Mikey Ragusa	RHP	R/R	Fr.	Coral Springs, FL	Cardinal Gibbons HS
33	Kaden Morris	RHP	R/R	R-Fr.	Fayetteville, NC	Cape Fear HS
34	Anderson Nance	RHP	R/R	So.	Eden, NC	John M. Morehead HS
36	Jacob Smith	RHP	R/R	Fr.	Winston-Salem, NC	Reagan HS
38	Landon Carr	RHP	R/R	R-Jr.	Waxhaw, NC	Cuthbertson HS
41	Jacob Dudan	RHP	L/R	Jr.	Huntersville, NC	Lake Norman Charter
47	Aiden Kitchings	RHP	R/R	Fr.	Braselton, GA	Rabun Gap Nacoochee
50	Brandon Novy	INF	R/R	So.	Holly Springs, NC	Pro5 Baseball Academy
99	Tristan Potts	LHP	L/L	So.	Waxhaw, NC	Cuthbertson HS

=== Coaching Staff ===
Name	Position	Seasion at NC State	Alma Mater
Elliott Avent	Head coach	30th	NC State (1978)
Chris Hart	Associate Head Coach	22nd	Florida State (2003)
Clint Chrysler	Pitching Coach	8th	Stetson (2009)
Bo Robinson	Assistant Coach	5th	Charlotte (1998)

== Season Overview ==
The 2026 campaign tested the Wolfpack's depth due to critical injuries across their pitching staff. Early in the conference schedule, the team lost both components of their elite weekend starting rotation—junior right-hander Jacob Dudan and junior left-hander Ryan Marohn—forcing head coach Elliott Avent to rely heavily on a highly active contingent of true freshmen relievers.

Despite these setbacks, individual standouts anchored the lineup. Outfielder Rett Johnson, infielder Luke Nixon, catcher/infielder Sherman Johnson, and outfielder Ty Head guided the offense through structural challenges. Sherman Johnson proved particularly dynamic down the final stretch, launching five home runs across the final seven regular season matchups.

Key moments of the regular season highlighted the team's high ceiling. The Wolfpack claimed an early marquee victory on March 3, defeating No. 16 Coastal Carolina 6–4. They also achieved a decisive season sweep over in-state rival East Carolina, culminating in an abbreviated 12–2, eight-inning run-rule victory in Raleigh on April 28.

In conference play, NC State opened their series against No. 11 Florida State with a 6–4 victory before dropping the final two contests. They faced additional hardship during a series sweep at the hands of No. 3 Georgia Tech and an ankle injury to starting shortstop Mikey Ryan during a weekend series against Virginia Tech, which opened opportunities for true freshman Christian Serrano.

Entering the regular season finale against archrival and No. 2 ranked North Carolina, the Wolfpack sat firmly on the NCAA Tournament bubble. After dropping the opening two games at Doak Field, NC State secured an emphatic 7–2 win in the Saturday finale. Driven by back-to-back home runs from Sherman Johnson and Chris McHugh, the victory solidified the program's postseason credentials and earned them the No. 9 seed in the conference tournament.

== Schedule and results ==
2026 NC State Wolfpack game log Regular season (32–21)

Date time, TV	Rank^{#}	Opponent^{#}	Result	Record	Site city, state
March 3		No. 16 Coastal Carolina*	W 6–4	{{{record}}}	Doak Field • Raleigh, NC {{{site_cityst}}}
March 13		Boston College	W 4–2	{{{record}}}	Doak Field • Raleigh, NC {{{site_cityst}}}
Mid-April		No. 11 Florida State	W 6–4	{{{record}}}	Doak Field • Raleigh, NC {{{site_cityst}}}
April 28		East Carolina*	W 12–2 (8)	{{{record}}}	Doak Field • Raleigh, NC {{{site_cityst}}}
May 14		No. 2 North Carolina			Doak Field • Raleigh, NC {{{site_cityst}}}
May 15		No. 2 North Carolina			Doak Field • Raleigh, NC {{{site_cityst}}}
May 16		No. 2 North Carolina	W 7–2	{{{record}}} (14–16)	Doak Field • Raleigh, NC {{{site_cityst}}}
Postseason
May 19; ACCN		vs. No. 16 (No. 8 seed) Duke			Truist Field • Charlotte, NC {{{site_cityst}}}
*Non-conference game. ^{#}Rankings from AP Poll. (#) Tournament seedings in parentheses.

== Awards and Honors ==
=== All-ACC Teams ===
Following the conclusion of the regular season, four members of the Wolfpack earned all-ACC honors:

- Rett Johnson (Fr., OF)
- Luke Nixon (Jr., INF)
- Sherman Johnson (Jr., INF)
- Ty Head (So., OF)
