= D1Baseball =

American baseball website

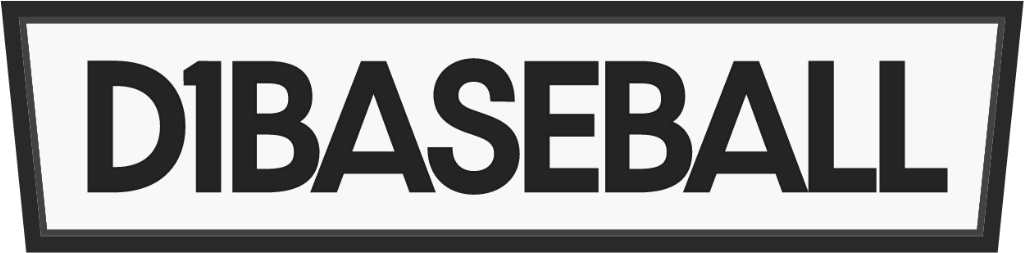
- Website type: Sports journalism
- Available in: English
- Founded: 2003; 23 years ago
- Owners: Aaron Fitt; Kyle Peterson; Kendall Rogers
- Website: d1baseball.com
- Commercial: Yes
- Registration: Optional, some features subscription-only
- Current status: Active

D1Baseball is an American sports journalism website that covers college baseball, specifically at the NCAA Division I level.

== Services ==
D1Baseball provides online news coverage of Division I college baseball, while also providing weekly rankings of the Top 25 teams in Division I baseball. D1Baseball's rankings are among the premier and widely cited rankings in college baseball.

== History ==
D1Baseball was founded as NCAA-Baseball.com in 2003 by Jeremy Mills, who would go on to serve on as a college baseball researcher for ESPN. Cynthia Mills, Jeremy's wife, would assume control of the site in 2006. In 2015, D1Baseball relaunched under the leadership of former major leaguer and ESPN college baseball personality Kyle Peterson. The website underwent a "aggressive expansion" into collegiate baseball reporting at this time, as the American Baseball Coaches Association described. The website hired Aaron Fitt, a national writer at Baseball America, and Kendall Rogers, a managing editor of college baseball at Perfect Game. In 2018, the website hired David Siefert, a former area scout for the Philadelphia Phillies, as its director of college scouting.
