= 2026 Texas A&M Aggies baseball team =

American college baseball season

2026 Texas A&M Aggies baseball

NCAA College Station Regional, 2-2
- Conference: Southeastern Conference

Ranking
- Coaches: No. 16
- D1Baseball.com: No. 17
- Record: 41–16 (18–11 SEC)
- Head coach: Michael Earley (2nd season)
- Associate head coach: Jason Kelly (2nd season)
- Assistant coaches: Troy Claunch (1st season); Jason Hutchins (28th season); Cliff Pennington (1st season)
- Home stadium: Olsen Field at Blue Bell Park

2026 Southeastern Conference baseball standings
	Conf.				Overall
Team	W		L	PCT	W		L	PCT
No. 3 Georgia ‍†‍‡‍^{y}	23	–	7	.767	53	–	14	.791
No. 5 Texas ‍‍‍^{y}	19	–	10	.655	46	–	15	.754
No. 17 Texas A&M ‍‍‍^{y}	18	–	11	.621	41	–	16	.719
No. 6 Alabama ‍‍‍^{y}	18	–	12	.600	42	–	21	.667
No. 16 Florida ‍‍‍^{y}	18	–	12	.600	41	–	21	.661
No. 9 Auburn ‍‍‍^{y}	17	–	13	.567	42	–	22	.656
No. 23 Arkansas ‍‍‍^{y}	17	–	13	.567	41	–	22	.651
No. 14 Mississippi State ‍‍‍^{y}	16	–	14	.533	43	–	19	.694
No. 7 Ole Miss ‍‍‍^{y}	15	–	15	.500	41	–	23	.641
Tennessee ‍‍‍^{y}	15	–	15	.500	38	–	22	.633
No. 1 Oklahoma ‍‍‍^{y}	14	–	16	.467	43	–	23	.652
Vanderbilt ‍‍‍	14	–	16	.467	33	–	25	.569
Kentucky ‍‍‍^{y}	13	–	17	.433	33	–	23	.589
LSU ‍‍‍	9	–	21	.300	30	–	28	.517
South Carolina ‍‍‍	7	–	23	.233	22	–	35	.386
Missouri ‍‍‍	6	–	24	.200	24	–	31	.436
† – Conference champion ‡ – Tournament champion y – Invited to the NCAA Tournament; As of June 22, 2026; Rankings from D1Baseball

The 2026 Texas A&M Aggies baseball team represented Texas A&M University during the 2026 NCAA Division I baseball season. The Aggies played their home games at Blue Bell Park. They were led by second year head coach, Michael Earley and associate head coach, Jason Kelly.

== Previous season ==
The 2025 season saw the Aggies coached under Michael Earley under his first year. There, the Aggies finished 30–26 (11–19 SEC). The Aggies reached the quarterfinals of the 2025 Southeastern Conference baseball tournament. Despite the quarterfinal run and a winning overall record, Texas A&M did not receive an at-large berth into the 2025 NCAA Division I baseball tournament.

== Offseason ==
Offseason departures
Name	Number	Pos.	Height	Weight	Year	Hometown	Notes
4	Gavin Kash	INF/OF	6 ft 3 in (1.91 m)	215 pounds (98 kg)	Senior	Sour Lake, TX	Graduated
8	Wyatt Henseler	INF	6 ft 1 in (1.85 m)	21 pounds (9.5 kg)	Graduate	Emmaus, PA	Graduated
12	Hayden Schott	OF	6 ft 2 in (1.88 m)	220 pounds (100 kg)	Graduate	Newport Beach, CA	Graduated
15	Matt Bergevin	INF	6 ft 4 in (1.93 m)	250 pounds (110 kg)	Graduate	Tempe, AZ	Graduated
19	Troy Wansing	LHP	6 ft 4 in (1.93 m)	225 pounds (102 kg)	Senior	Kansas City, MO	Graduated
32	Brad Rudis	RHP	6 ft 0 in (1.83 m)	195 pounds (88 kg)	Senior	Madisonville, TX	Graduated
34	Josh Stewart	RHP	6 ft 2 in (1.88 m)	195 pounds (88 kg)	Senior	Georgetown, TX	Graduated

=== Outgoing transfers ===
Outgoing transfers
Name	Number	Pos.	Height	Weight	Hometown	Year	New school
Jacob Galloway	2	C	5 ft 9 in (1.75 m)	180 pounds (82 kg)	Camarillo, CA	Junior	Oregon State

=== 2025 MLB draft ===
2025 MLB draft selections
Round	Pick	Overall pick	Player	Position	MLB team	Source
1	27	27	Jace LaViolette	OF	Cleveland Guardians	
CB-B	4	71	Justin Lamkin	P	Kansas City Royals	
3	29	103	Kaeden Kent	SS	New York Yankees	
7	13	208	Myles Patton	P	Boston Red Sox	
9	3	258	Kaiden Wilson	P	Miami Marlins	
9	6	261	Wyatt Henseler	3B	Washington Nationals	
9	27	282	Ryan Prager	P	Cleveland Guardians	
11	12	327	Luke Jackson	P	Tampa Bay Rays	

=== Acquisitions ===
==== Incoming transfers ====
Incoming transfers
No.	Name	Pos.	Height	Weight	Year	Bat/Throw	Hometown	Previous school
3	Jake Duer	OF	6 ft 1 in (1.85 m)	195 pounds (88 kg)	Senior	L/L	Flower Mound, TX	Florida Atlantic
4	Travis Chestnut	OF/INF	5 ft 7 in (1.70 m)	190 pounds (86 kg)	Graduate	R/R	Pflugerville, TX	St. Edward's (TX)
8	Chris Hacopian	INF	6 ft 1 in (1.85 m)	210 pounds (95 kg)	Junior	R/R	Potomac, MD	Maryland
17	Zane Becker	C	5 ft 11 in (1.80 m)	200 pounds (91 kg)	Sophomore	R/R	Flower Mound, TX	Arkansas
18	Wesley Jordan	OF/INF	6 ft 3 in (1.91 m)	225 pounds (102 kg)	Senior	R/R	Highland Village, TX	Baylor
19	Juan Vargas	RHP	6 ft 1 in (1.85 m)	200 pounds (91 kg)	Junior	R/R	Panama City, PAN	Tennessee Tech
32	Hunter Bond	LHP	6 ft 6 in (1.98 m)	190 pounds (86 kg)	Junior	L/L	College Station, TX	Blinn
39	Ethan Darden	LHP	6 ft 0 in (1.83 m)	175 pounds (79 kg)	Senior	L/L	Rock Hill, SC	Clemson
40	Cooper Powell	LHP	5 ft 11 in (1.80 m)	185 pounds (84 kg)	Sophomore	L/L	Bedford, TX	Northwest Florida State
47	Blake LaBuda	C	5 ft 10 in (1.78 m)	190 pounds (86 kg)	Senior	R/R	Broomfield, CO	UT Tyler
52	Elijah Batista	INF	5 ft 9 in (1.75 m)	165 pounds (75 kg)	Senior	R/R	El Paso, TX	West Texas A&M

==== Recruiting class ====
2025 Texas A&M Recruits
Name	B/T	Pos.	Height	Weight	Hometown	High School
Nico Partida	R/R	INF/RHP	6 ft 0 in (1.83 m)	195 pounds (88 kg)	Manvel, TX	Pearland
Boston Kellner	R/R	INF	6 ft 0 in (1.83 m)	205 pounds (93 kg)	Chandler, AZ	Hamilton (AZ)
Luke Billings	R/R	OF/RHP	6 ft 2 in (1.88 m)	200 pounds (91 kg)	Prosper, TX	Prosper
David Ramirez	L/L	LHP	5 ft 11 in (1.80 m)	165 pounds (75 kg)	Kemah, TX	Clear Falls
Jorian Wilson	L/R	OF	6 ft 4 in (1.93 m)	240 pounds (110 kg)	Hallettsville, TX	Hallettsville
Hunter Vincent	L/L	LHP	6 ft 3 in (1.91 m)	220 pounds (100 kg)	Prosper, TX	Prosper
Cole Hubert	L/L	LHP	5 ft 11 in (1.80 m)	170 pounds (77 kg)	Hellertown, PA	Saucon Valley
Cooper Fulbright	R/R	RHP	6 ft 2 in (1.88 m)	190 pounds (86 kg)	Missouri City, TX	Strake Jesuit

== Personnel ==
=== Starters ===
Lineup
Pos.	No.	Player.	Year
C	16	Bear Harrison	Junior
1B	9	Gavin Grahovac	Junior
2B	8	Chris Hacopian	Junior
3B	2	Nico Partida	Freshman
SS	6	Boston Kellner	Freshman
LF	1	Terrence Kiel II	Sophomore
CF	13	Caden Sorrell	Junior
RF	23	Jorian Wilson	Freshman
DH	3	Jake Duer	Senior

Weekend pitching rotation
Day	No.	Player.	Year
Friday	20	Aiden Sims	Sophomore
Saturday	38	Shane Sdao	RS Junior
Sunday	21	Weston Moss	Junior

=== Roster ===
2026 Texas A&M Aggies baseball team
Players
Coaches

#	Pos.	Name	B/T	Height	Weight	Year	Home town
1	UTL	Cameron Benson	L/R	6 ft 3 in (1.91 m)	185 lb (84 kg)	Jr	Farmington Hills, MI
0	INF	Sawyer Farr	S/R	6 ft 4 in (1.93 m)	190 lb (86 kg)	So	Fort Worth, TX
1	OF	Terrence Kiel II	R/R	6 ft 1 in (1.85 m)	195 lb (88 kg)	So	Atlanta, GA
2	UTL	Nico Partida	R/R	6 ft 0 in (1.83 m)	195 lb (88 kg)	Fr	Manvel, TX
3	OF	Jake Duer	L/L	6 ft 1 in (1.85 m)	195 lb (88 kg)	Sr	Flower Mound, TX
4	UTL	Travis Chestnut	R/R	5 ft 7 in (1.7 m)	190 lb (86 kg)	Gr	Pflugerville, TX
6	INF	Boston Kellner	R/R	6 ft 0 in (1.83 m)	205 lb (93 kg)	Fr	Chandler, AZ
8	INF	Chris Hacopian	R/R	6 ft 1 in (1.85 m)	210 lb (95 kg)	Jr	Potomac, MD
9	INF	Gavin Grahovac	R/R	6 ft 3 in (1.91 m)	230 lb (104 kg)	Jr	Orange, CA
10	INF	Ben Royo	R/R	6 ft 2 in (1.88 m)	200 lb (91 kg)	Sr	Corpus Christi, TX
12	RHP	Josh Stewart	R/R	6 ft 2 in (1.88 m)	210 lb (95 kg)	Gr	Georgetown, TX
13	OF	Caden Sorrell	L/L	6 ft 3 in (1.91 m)	210 lb (95 kg)	Jr	Highland Village, TX
14	C	Luke Billings	R/R	6 ft 2 in (1.88 m)	200 lb (91 kg)	Fr	Prosper, TX
15	LHP	David Ramirez	L/L	5 ft 11 in (1.8 m)	165 lb (75 kg)	Fr	Kemah, TX
16	C	Bear Harrison	R/R	6 ft 3 in (1.91 m)	230 lb (104 kg)	Jr	Danville, CA
17	C	Zane Becker	R/R	5 ft 11 in (1.8 m)	200 lb (91 kg)	So	Flower Mound, TX
18	C	Wesley Jordan	R/R	6 ft 3 in (1.91 m)	225 lb (102 kg)	Sr	Highland Village, TX
19	RHP	Juan Vargas	R/R	6 ft 1 in (1.85 m)	200 lb (91 kg)	Jr	Panama City, PAN
20	RHP	Aiden Sims	L/R	6 ft 2 in (1.88 m)	200 lb (91 kg)	So	Forney, TX
21	RHP	Weston Moss	R/R	6 ft 4 in (1.93 m)	190 lb (86 kg)	Jr	Spring, TX
23	OF	Jorian Wilson	L/R	6 ft 4 in (1.93 m)	240 lb (109 kg)	Fr	Hallettsville, TX
25	RHP	Clayton Freshcorn	R/R	6 ft 0 in (1.83 m)	180 lb (82 kg)	Jr	Waller, TX
27	RHP	Gavin Lyons	R/R	6 ft 3 in (1.91 m)	200 lb (91 kg)	So	Guilford, CT
28	LHP	Caden McCoy	R/L	6 ft 3 in (1.91 m)	220 lb (100 kg)	So	Bloomington, IN
30	LHP	Hunter Vincent	L/L	6 ft 3 in (1.91 m)	220 lb (100 kg)	Fr	Prosper, TX
31	RHP	Grant Cunningham	R/R	6 ft 3 in (1.91 m)	225 lb (102 kg)	Sr	Seattle, WA
32	LHP	Hunter Bond	L/L	6 ft 6 in (1.98 m)	190 lb (86 kg)	Jr	College Station, TX
35	OF	Sam Erickson	R/L	6 ft 1 in (1.85 m)	215 lb (98 kg)	So	Flower Mound, TX
36	LHP	Cole Hubert	L/L	5 ft 11 in (1.8 m)	170 lb (77 kg)	Fr	Hellertown, PA
38	LHP	Shane Sdao	L/L	6 ft 3 in (1.91 m)	185 lb (84 kg)	RS Jr	Montgomery, TX
39	LHP	Ethan Darden	L/L	6 ft 0 in (1.83 m)	175 lb (79 kg)	Sr	Rock Hill, SC
40	LHP	Cooper Powell	L/L	5 ft 11 in (1.8 m)	185 lb (84 kg)	So	Bedford, TX
44	RHP	Cooper Fulbright	R/R	6 ft 2 in (1.88 m)	190 lb (86 kg)	Fr	Missouri City, TX
46	INF	Blake Binderup	R/R	6 ft 6 in (1.98 m)	230 lb (104 kg)	RS Jr	College Station, TX
47	C	Blake LaBuda	R/R	5 ft 10 in (1.78 m)	190 lb (86 kg)	Sr	Broomfield, CO
52	INF	Elijah Batista	R/R	5 ft 9 in (1.75 m)	165 lb (75 kg)	Sr	El Paso, TX

Head coach

Michael Earley

Assistant coach(es)

Jason Kelly
Troy Claunch
Jason Hutchins
Cliff Pennington
Dylan Olsonawski

Legend

- (C) Team captain
- (S) Suspended
- (I) Ineligible
- Injured
- Current redshirt

Roster

== Preseason ==
=== SEC coaches poll ===
SEC coaches poll
Predicted finish	Team	Votes (1st place)
1	LSU	231 (9)
2	Texas	214 (1)
3	Mississippi State	205 (4)
4	Arkansas	203 (2)
5	Auburn	175
6	Tennessee	162
7	Florida	156
8	Vanderbilt	151
9	Georgia	133
10	Ole Miss	110
11	Kentucky	99
12	Alabama	87
13	Texas A&M	86
14	Oklahoma	84
15	South Carolina	49
16	Missouri	31

=== Preseason awards and honors ===
==== Preseason SEC awards and honors ====
Preseason All-SEC Team
Player	No.	Position	Class	Designation
Caden Sorrell	13	OF	Junior	First Team

== Schedule and results ==
2026 Texas A&M Aggies baseball game log (41–16)
*Denotes non–conference game • 2026 Schedule and results source • Rankings based on the teams' current ranking in the D1 Baseball Poll • (#) Tournament seedings in parentheses
W Texas A&M win • L Texas A&M loss • Postponement or cancellation • Bold denotes Texas A&M player
Regular season (39–13)

February (9–1)
Date	Opponent	Rank	Site/stadium	Score	Win	Loss	Save	TV	Attendance	Record	SEC
February 14	Tennessee Tech*	No. 25	Blue Bell Park; College Station, TX	**W** 15–6	**Sdao** (1–0)	Pease (0–1)	None	SECN+	7,213	1–0	—
February 15	Tennessee Tech*	No. 25	Blue Bell Park	**W** 23–7^{7}	**Moss** (1–0)	Casteel (0–1)	None	SECN+	5,462	2–0	—
February 16	Tennessee Tech*	No. 25	Blue Bell Park	**W** 7–1	**Sims** (1–0)	Moller (0–1)	**Freshcorn** (1)	SECN+	5,561	3–0	—
February 18	Texas A&M–Corpus Christi*	No. 24	Blue Bell Park	**W** 8–3	**Darden** (1–0)	Crowley (0–1)	None	SECN+	5,385	4–0	—
February 20	Penn*	No. 24	Blue Bell Park	**W** 1–0	**Stewart** (1–0)	Shurtleff (0–1)	None	SECN+	6,235	4–0	—
February 21	Penn*	No. 24	Blue Bell Park	**W** 2–1^{11}	**Freshcorn** (1–0)	Moulin (0–1)	None	SECN+	6,888	5–0	—
February 22	Penn*	No. 24	Blue Bell Park	**W** 7–1	**Sims** (2–0)	Katz (0–1)	None	SECN+	5,265	6–0	—
February 24	Lamar*	No. 23	Blue Bell Park	**W** 25–5^{7}	**Lyons** (1–0)	Burdick (0–1)	None	SECN+	5,223	7–0	—
Amegy Bank College Baseball Series
February 27	vs. Virginia Tech*	No. 23	Globe Life Field; Arlington, TX	**W** 10–0^{7}	**Sdao** (2–0)	Renfrow (0–2)	None	FloSports	7,181	8–0	—
February 28	vs. No. 1 UCLA*	No. 23	Globe Life Field	**L** 1–11^{7}	Barnett (3–0)	**Moss** (1–1)	None	FloSports	13,097	9–1	—

March (14–4)
Date	Opponent	Rank	Site/stadium	Score	Win	Loss	Save	TV	Attendance	Record	SEC
Amegy Bank College Baseball Series
March 1	vs. Arizona State*	No. 23	Globe Life Field	**W** 9–3	**Freshcorn** (2–0)	Alba (1–1)	None	FloSports	8,903	10–1	—
March 3	Incarnate Word*	No. 22	Blue Bell Park	**W** 11–1^{7}	**Vargas** (1–0)	Vanegas (1–2)	**Stewart** (1)	SECN+	4,528	11–1	—
March 6	Oakland*	No. 22	Blue Bell Park	**W** 6–3	**Sdao** (1–0)	Dahlof (0–3)	**Freshcorn** (2)	SECN+	4,708	12–1	—
March 7	Oakland*	No. 22	Blue Bell Park	**W** 10–2	**Moss** (2–1)	Cooper (0–1)	None	SECN+	5,029	13–1	—
March 8	Oakland*	No. 22	Blue Bell Park	**W** 10–2	**Sims** (3–0)	Ware (0–2)	None	SECN+	5,105	14–1	—
March 10	Stephen F. Austin*	No. 22	Blue Bell Park	**W** 14–1^{7}	**Darden** (2–0)	O'Farrell (0–1)	None	SECN+	5,910	15–1	—
March 13	at No. 9 Oklahoma	No. 22	Kimrey Family Stadium; Norman, OK	**L** 7–8	Bodin (2–0)	**Freshcorn** (2–1)	None	SECN+	3,727	15–2	0–1
March 14	at No. 9 Oklahoma	No. 22	Kimrey Family Stadium	**W** 9–5	**Moss** (3–1)	Mercurius (4–1)	**Freshcorn** (3)	SECN+	5,072	16–2	1–1
March 15	at No. 9 Oklahoma	No. 22	Kimrey Family Stadium	**L** 11–12	Bodin (3–0)	**Cunningham** (0–1)	None	SECN+	3,031	16–3	1–2
March 17	Texas State*	No. 23	Blue Bell Park	**W** 9–6	**Lyons** (2–0)	Canalichio (0–1)	**Freshcorn** (4)	SECN+	5,749	17–3	—
March 20	No. 7 Georgia	No. 23	Blue Bell Park	**L** 4–9	Byrd (1–1)	**Sdao** (3–1)	None	SECN+	7,870	17–4	1–3
March 21	No. 7 Georgia	No. 23	Blue Bell Park	**L** 2–8	Scott (4–0)	**Moss** (3–2)	None	SECN+	6,925	17–5	1–4
March 21	No. 7 Georgia	No. 23	Blue Bell Park	**W** 18–5^{7}	**Sims** (4–0)	Ishikawa (1–1)	None	SECN+	6,087	18–5	2–4
March 24	Houston Christian*	No. 25	Blue Bell Park	**W** 5–1	**Cunningham** (1–1)	Feltman (1–1)	**Freshcorn** (5)	SECN+	4,710	19–5	—
March 27	at Missouri	No. 25	Taylor Stadium; Columbia, MO	**W** 11–9	**Vargas** (2–0)	McDevitt (3–2)	**Freshcorn** (6)	SECN+	1,842	20–5	3–4
March 28	at Missouri	No. 25	Taylor Stadium	**W** 14–6	**Lyons** (3–0)	Kehlenbrink (3–3)	**Cunningham** (1)	SECN+	1,135	21–5	4–4
March 29	at Missouri	No. 25	Taylor Stadium	**W** 14–3^{7}	**Sims** (5–0)	Sullivan (0–3)	None	SECN+	1,295	22–5	5–4
March 31	Sam Houston*	No. 20	Blue Bell Park	**W** 16–2^{7}	**Cunningham** (2–1)	Holzer (0–3)	None	SECN+	5,383	23–5	—

April (11–3)
Date	Opponent	Rank	Site/stadium	Score	Win	Loss	Save	TV	Attendance	Record	SEC
April 2	Vanderbilt	No. 20	Blue Bell Park	**L** 8–14	Seiber (5–1)	**Sdao** (3–2)	Baird (1)	SECN+	5,543	23–6	5–5
April 3	Vanderbilt	No. 20	Blue Bell Park	**W** 8–4	**Lyons** (4–0)	Nadeau (1–2)	None	SECN+	5,949	24–6	6–5
April 4	Vanderbilt	No. 20	Blue Bell Park	**W** 12–0^{7}	**Sims** (6–0)	Stillman (0–1)	None	SECN+	6,640	25–6	7–5
April 7	at Texas State*	No. 18	Bobcat Ballpark; San Marcos, TX	**L** 8–9	Smith (2–0)	**Vargas** (2–1)	Cooper (5)	ESPN+	2,786	25–7	—
April 10	No. 2 Texas	No. 20	Blue Bell Park	**W** 9–8	**Darden** (3–0)	Leffew (2–1)	**Freshcorn** (7)	SECN	7,664	26–7	8–5
April 11	No. 2 Texas	No. 18	Blue Bell Park	**W** 11–4	**Lyons** (5–0)	Harrison (4–2)	None	ESPN2	7,812	27–7	9–5
April 12	No. 2 Texas	No. 18	Blue Bell Park	**Canceled (inclement weather)**							
April 14	Houston*	No. 10	Blue Bell Park	**W** 10–2	**Cunningham** (3–1)	Solis (2–2)	None	SECN+	5,445	28–7	—
April 17	at LSU	No. 10	Alex Box Stadium; Baton Rouge, LA	**W** 10–4	**Lyons** (6–0)	Evans (2–2)	None	ESPN	11,704	29–7	10–5
April 18	at LSU	No. 10	Alex Box Stadium	**W** 7–2	**Sims** (7–0)	Schmidt (4–4)	None	SECN+	12,325	30–7	11–5
April 19	at LSU	No. 10	Alex Box Stadium	**W** 5–2	**Lyons** (7–0)	Cowan (1–2)	None	ESPN	10,938	31–7	12–5
April 21	UTSA*	No. 7	Blue Bell Park	**Canceled (inclement weather)**							
April 24	at No. 21 Florida	No. 7	Condron Ballpark; Gainesville, FL	**L** 2–9	King (7–2)	**Sdao** (3–3)	None	SECN+	5,880	31–8	12–6
April 25	at No. 21 Florida	No. 7	Condron Ballpark	**W** 8–4	**Sims** (8–0)	Peterson (1–4)	**Freshcorn** (8)	SECN	6,639	32–8	13–6
April 26	at No. 21 Florida	No. 7	Condron Ballpark	**W** 5–1	**Lyons** (8–0)	Sandefer (2–2)	**Freshcorn** (9)	SECN+	5,578	33–8	14–6
April 28	Tarleton State*	No. 7	Blue Bell Park	**W** 9–7	**Darden** (4–0)	Lovin (0–1)	**Freshcorn** (10)	SECN+	5,653	34–8	—

May (5–5)
Date	Opponent	Rank	Site/stadium	Score	Win	Loss	Save	TV	Attendance	Record	SEC
May 2 (DH 1)	No. 8 Auburn	No. 7	Blue Bell Park	**L** 5–18^{7}	Alvarez (8–2)	**Sdao** (3–4)	None	SECN	7,262	34–9	14–7
May 2 (DH 2)	No. 8 Auburn	No. 7	Blue Bell Park	**L** 4–5	Marciano (4–3)	**Sims** (8–1)	Sanders (3)	SECN+	6,656	34–10	14–8
May 3	No. 8 Auburn	No. 7	Blue Bell Park	**W** 4–3	**Moss** (4–2)	Petrovic (7–2)	**Freshcorn** (11)	SECN+	6,818	35–10	15–8
May 5	Prairie View*	No. 9	Blue Bell Park	**W** 16–7	**Cunningham** (4–1)	Dove (1–9)	None	SECN+	5,063	36–10	—
May 8	at No. 20 Ole Miss	No. 9	Swayze Field; Oxford, MS	**L** 3–5	Elliott (5–2)	**Darden** (4–1)	Hooks (6)	SECN+	9,027	36–11	15–9
May 9 (DH 1)	at No. 20 Ole Miss	No. 9	Swayze Field	**W** 18–5^{7}	**Lyons** (9–0)	Townsend (5–2)	None	SECN	8,791	37–11	16–9
May 9 (DH 2)	at No. 20 Ole Miss	No. 9	Swayze Field	**L** 5–6	Robertson (3–1)	**Freshcorn** (2–2)	Hooks (7)	SECN+	10,249	37–12	16–10
May 14	No. 13 Mississippi State	No. 10	Blue Bell Park	**L** 11–18	Valincius (9–2)	**Darden** (4–2)	None	SECN	5,862	37–13	16–11
May 15	No. 13 Mississippi State	No. 10	Blue Bell Park	**W** 11–9	**Sdao** (4–4)	Stone (6–2)	**Freshcorn** (12)	SECN+	6,776	38–13	17–11
May 16	No. 13 Mississippi State	No. 10	Blue Bell Park	**W** 7–6	**Freshcorn** (3–2)	Foster (0–3)	None	SECN+	6,600	39–13	18–11

Postseason (2–3)

SEC tournament (0–1)
Date	Opponent	Rank	Site/stadium	Score	Win	Loss	Save	TV	Attendance	Record	SECT
May 22	vs. (6) Auburn	(3); No. 10	Hoover Metropolitan Stadium; Hoover, AL	**L** 0–7	Alvarez (9–3)	**Darden** (4–3)	Cormier (2)	SECN	13,105	39–14	0–1

College Station Regional (2–3)
Date	Opponent	Rank	Site/stadium	Score	Win	Loss	Save	TV	Attendance	Record	NCAAT
May 29	(4) Lamar (Upper Bracket Regional)	(1); No. 11	Blue Bell Park	**W** 7–5	**Freshcorn** (4–2)	Carpio (3–3)	None	SECN	7,401	40–14	1–0
May 30	(3) Texas State (Upper Winner Bracket Regional)	(1); No. 11	Blue Bell Park	**W** 17–2	**Moss** (5–2)	Tovar (9–4)	None	ESPN2	7,061	41–14	2–0
May 31	(2) USC	(1); No. 11	Blue Bell Park	**L** 3–14	Johnson (8–2)	**Darden** (4–4)	None	ESPN	6,934	41–15	2–1
June 1	(2) USC	(1); No. 11	Blue Bell Park	**L** 1–7	Herrell (5–4)	**Freshcorn** (4–3)	None	ESPN2	7,042	41–16	2–2

== Rankings ==
Ranking movements Legend: ██ Increase in ranking ██ Decrease in ranking — = Not ranked RV = Received votes
	Week																	
Poll	Pre	1	2	3	4	5	6	7	8	9	10	11	12	13	14	15	16	Final
Coaches'	RV	RV*	23	20	20	21	24	20	15	7	7	7	7	10	9	10	10*	16
Baseball America	—	22	21	20	19	21	—	23	16	9	8	6	11	15	13	13*	13*	18
NCBWA†	26	25	18	18	17	23	RV	21	16	10	8	7	10	11	11	11*	16	16
D1Baseball	25	24	23	22	22	23	25	20	18	10	7	7	9	10	10	11	11*	17
Perfect Game	—	—	—	—	—	—	—	25	19	14	9	8	11	13	12	12*	12*	22

† NCBWA ranks 30 teams in their preseason poll, but only ranks 25 teams weekly during the season.
* A new poll was not released for this week, so for comparison purposes, the previous week's ranking is inserted in this week's slot.
