= Jason Kelly =

American baseball coach

Playing career
- 1999–2000: Cal Poly
- 2001: Cuesta
- 2002: Missouri Valley

Coaching career (HC unless noted)
- 2003: Cuesta (asst.)
- 2005–2006: Chico State (P)
- 2007–2012: Cal Poly (P)
- 2013–2019: Washington (P/AHC)
- 2020–2021: Arizona State (P)
- 2022: LSU (P)
- 2023–2024: Washington
- 2025–2026: Texas A&M (P/AHC)

Administrative career (AD unless noted)
- 2004: Cal Poly (DoBO)

Head coaching record
- Overall: 54–51–1 (NCAA DI)
- Tournaments: NCAA: 1–2

Jason Kelly is a baseball coach and former player, who was most recently the pitching coach of the Texas A&M Aggies. He played college baseball for the Cal Poly Mustangs, the Cuesta Cougars and the Missouri Valley Vikings.

== Playing career ==
Kelly grew up in Santa Maria, California, where he attended St. Joseph High School. As a junior at St. Joseph, Kelly posted a 14–0 record with an earned run average (ERA) of 1.45, and recorded 107 strikeouts in 87 innings pitched, earning him Santa Maria Times All-Area MVP. Kelly enrolled at California Polytechnic State University, San Luis Obispo, where he played baseball for the Mustangs. As a freshman in 1999, Kelly pitched to a 3–1 record, a 7.91 ERA. and 30 innings pitched. In his second season, he redshirted. For the 2001 season, Kelly transferred to Cuesta College, where he pitched for the Cougars' head coach, Larry Lee. Kelly led the team with ten wins and 107 1/3 innings pitched, also getting named First Team All-Western State Conference. Kelly would finish his career playing for the Missouri Valley Vikings during the 2002 season.

== Coaching career ==
Kelly began his coaching career as a volunteer assistant for the Cal Poly Mustangs, a job he supplemented while also working at a local grocery store. The following year, he got his first full-time assist job, being named the pitching coach at Chico State. Kelly would reunite with Larry Lee, joining his staff at Cal Poly as the pitching coach.

On August 16, 2012, Kelly was named the pitching coach of the Washington Huskies. Kelly helped elevate Husky pitching, culminating in a 2018 College World Series appearance. For his efforts during that season, he was named d1baseball.com's Assistant Coach of the Year. At the conclusion of the 2019 season, Kelly left the Huskies to take the same position with the Arizona State Sun Devils. Following head coach Tracy Smith's dismissal, Kelly left Arizona State to become the pitching coach of the LSU Tigers.

On June 24, 2022, Kelly was named the head coach of the Washington Huskies.

On June 30, 2024, it was announced that Kelly would leave Washington to join new Texas A&M baseball coach Michael Earley as the pitching coach. On June 2, 2026, Kelly's contract with A&M expired without renewal, and the two parted ways.

== Head coaching record ==
Record table
Season	Team	Overall	Conference	Standing	Postseason
Washington Huskies (Pac-12 Conference) (2023–2024)
2023	Washington	35–20	17–12	3rd	NCAA Regional
2024	Washington	19–31–1	10–20	9th	
Washington:		54–51–1	27–32		
Total:		54–51–1			
National champion Postseason invitational champion Conference regular season champion Conference regular season and conference tournament champion Division regular season champion Division regular season and conference tournament champion Conference tournament champion
