= Matt Swope =

American baseball coach

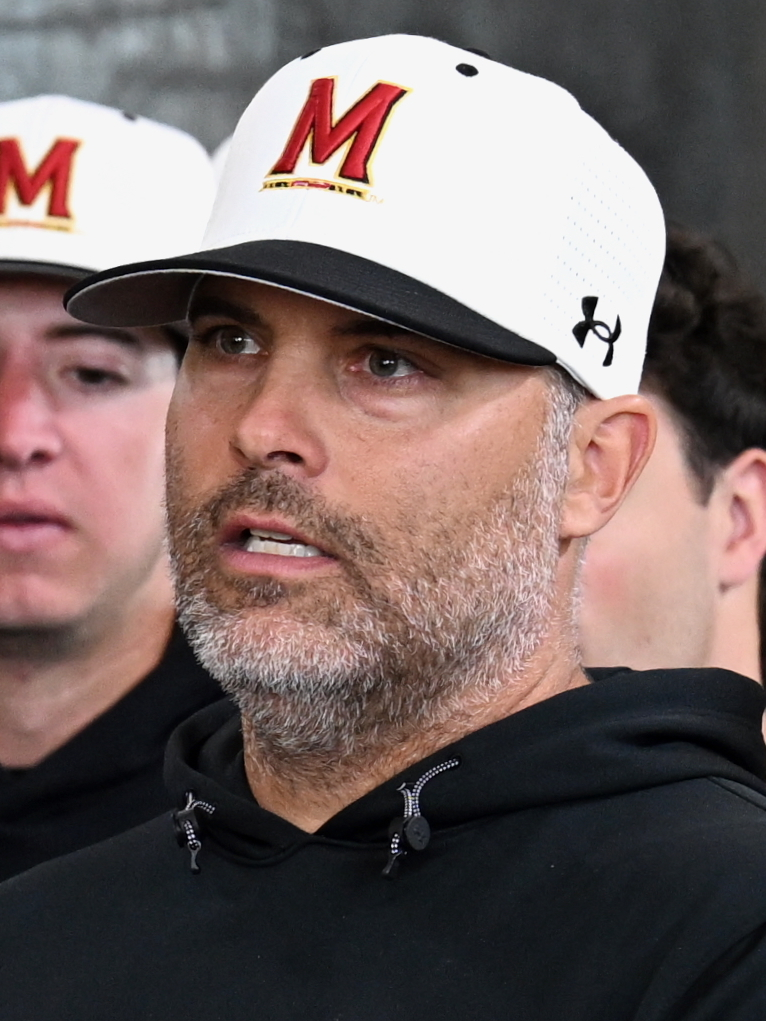
- Swope in 2026

Current position
- Title: Head coach
- Team: Maryland
- Conference: Big Ten
- Record: 88–80 (.524)

Biographical details
- Born: June 1, 1980 (age 46); New Carrollton, Maryland, U.S.

Playing career
- 1999–2002: Maryland
- Position: Outfielder

Coaching career (HC unless noted)
- 2017–2022: Maryland (assistant)
- 2022–2023: Maryland (associate)
- 2024–present: Maryland

Administrative career (AD unless noted)
- 2013–2017: Maryland (director of operations)

Head coaching record
- Overall: 88–80 (.524)

Matthew Ross Swope (born June 1, 1980) is an American college baseball coach and currently the head coach for the Maryland Terrapins baseball team. Swope previously played collegiately and was an assistant coach for Maryland before becoming head coach.

== Early life and education ==
Matt Swope was born on June 1, 1980, and is a native of New Carrollton, Maryland. Swope attended DeMatha Catholic High School before he attended college. After high school, Swope chose to attend the University of Maryland, where he also opted to play baseball for Maryland. Swope enjoyed a successful career at Maryland, with many of his total statistics still remaining in the top ten all-time for Maryland baseball. Swope graduated from Maryland in 2003 with a degree in criminology and criminal justice.

== Coaching career ==
After a couple of years on various professional baseball teams, Swope rejoined Maryland to become the director of operations for baseball. Swope was elevated to the position of assistant coach after helping improve the quality of various aspects of Maryland Terrapins baseball. Later, Swope would become associate head coach for Maryland. Following the 2023 season and former coach Rob Vaughn's departure to become the head coach for Alabama, Swope became the head coach for the Maryland Terrapins baseball team.

== Head coaching record ==
Record table
Season	Team	Overall	Conference	Standing	Postseason
Maryland Terrapins (Big Ten Conference) (2024–present)
2024	Maryland	34–22	10–14	11th	
2025	Maryland	27–29	12–18	13th	
2026	Maryland	27–29	9–21	T–13th	
Maryland:		88–80 (.524)	31–53 (.369)		
Total:		88–80 (.524)			
National champion Postseason invitational champion Conference regular season champion Conference regular season and conference tournament champion Division regular season champion Division regular season and conference tournament champion Conference tournament champion
