= Texas A&M Aggies baseball =

Baseball team

Texas A&M Aggies
- 2026 Texas A&M Aggies baseball team
- Founded: 1876 (149 years ago)
- Overall record: 2,550–1,427–42
- University: Texas A&M University
- Athletic director: Trev Alberts
- Head coach: Michael Earley (2nd season)
- Conference: Southeastern
- Location: College Station, Texas
- Home stadium: Olsen Field at Blue Bell Park (capacity: 5,400 seating (~7,000 with standing room))
- Nickname: Aggies
- Colors: Maroon and white

College World Series runner-up
- 2024

College World Series appearances
- 1951, 1964, 1993, 1999, 2011, 2017, 2022, 2024

NCAA regional champions
- 1993, 1999, 2004, 2007, 2008, 2011, 2015, 2016, 2017, 2022, 2024

NCAA tournament appearances
- 1951, 1955, 1959, 1964, 1975, 1976, 1977, 1978, 1984, 1986, 1987, 1988, 1989, 1991, 1992, 1993, 1995, 1997, 1998, 1999, 2003, 2004, 2007, 2008, 2009, 2010, 2011, 2012, 2013, 2014, 2015, 2016, 2017, 2018, 2019, 2022, 2023, 2024, 2026

Conference tournament champions
- Southwest Conference: 1986, 1989; Big 12 Conference: 2007, 2010, 2011; Southeastern Conference: 2016

Conference regular season champions
- Southwest Conference; 1931, 1934, 1937, 1942, 1943, 1951, 1955, 1959, 1964, 1966, 1977, 1978, 1986, 1989, 1993 Big 12 Conference; 1998, 1999, 2008, 2011

The Texas A&M Aggies baseball team represents Texas A&M University in NCAA Division I college baseball. The Aggies have competed in the Southeastern Conference since 2013. The Aggies play home games at Olsen Field at Blue Bell Park. The team was the 2024 runner-up in the Men's College World Series Final, losing in a closely contested three-game series to Tennessee.

== History ==
Texas A&M baseball has compiled an all-time record of 2,550–1,427–42 (.634 winning percentage) through the 2014 season. The Aggies have won 20 conference championships (15 in the Southwest Conference, four in the Big 12, and one in the SEC). Texas A&M has made 33 NCAA tournament appearances, advancing to the College World Series eight times, in 1951, 1964, 1993, 1999, 2011, 2017, 2022, and 2024. The Aggies have never won a national championship in baseball. Texas A&M's long, rich history and tradition in baseball began in 1894. After a decade break, the program returned in 1904 and has competed every year since. With over 2,700 all-time victories, the Aggies rank second in all-time wins among SEC programs.

=== The early years (1879–1958) ===
Baseball is among the first organized sports played at Texas A&M, and what was then A&M College of Texas fielded its first club in 1879. The first games were played between members of Company A and Company B of the Corps of Cadets. It's not surprising baseball started so early, considering that Texas A&M and Major League Baseball were both founded in 1876, and it was one of America's most popular sports of the period. The team played many of its earliest games against Galveston, Bryan, Baylor, Navasota, and Calvert. Games were limited by what town could be reached by train or horse. Most of the teams didn't have uniforms or even a real field. The same train tracks that run by Olsen Field today used to carry the team to its games. By 1907, the Cincinnati Reds had stopped off in College Station and beat A&M 9–0, scoring all 9 runs in the third inning, when, "our boys went to pieces." Seventeen head coaches led A&M baseball from 1904 to 1958, including football coaches Charley Moran, Dana X. Bible, and Homer Norton. During this period, A&M finished with a 626–469–27 record (.572 winning percentage), claimed seven Southwest Conference titles, and made their first trip to the College World Series in 1951. In 1951, led by Beau Bell, the Aggies won a three-game series in the District VI playoffs over Arizona and advanced to the College World Series. In the 1951 College World Series, Texas A&M defeated Ohio State 3–2 in a lower first-round elimination game to give the Aggies their first College World Series win.

=== Tom Chandler era (1959–1984) ===
Tom Chandler came to Texas A&M as an assistant to head coach Beau Bell in 1958. He took over as head coach in 1959 and immediately won the Southwest Conference championship in his first year. Over the next 25 years at the helm, Chandler led the Aggies to four more conference championships, eight NCAA postseasons, and an appearance in the 1964 College World Series. His teams finished 660–329–10 (.667 winning percentage). Chandler was honored for his accomplishments by being inducted into the American Association of Baseball Coaches Hall of Fame. His jersey is now displayed on the left-field wall at Olsen Field in recognition of his contributions. Tom Chandler was born on March 19, 1925, in Greenville, Texas. He attended Dallas public schools and graduated from Adamson High School in 1943. He then attended Arkansas A&M for two years in the Marine V-12 program. In 1946, he graduated from the Marine Corps Officers School. He served as a member of the Marine Corps Honor Guard that presented the colors at the funeral of President Franklin D. Roosevelt in April 1945.

=== Mark Johnson era (1985–2005) ===
Mark Johnson, an assistant under Chandler, assumed head-coaching duties in 1985 and guided the program for just over two decades. During that time, his teams put together a win–loss record of 876–431–3 (.670 winning percentage) and made College World Series appearances in 1993 and 1999. Johnson's highly ranked teams and powerful offenses in the late 1980s and throughout the 1990s brought excitement and increased attendance to Olsen Field. His #7 jersey hangs on the right-field wall at Olsen Field in honor of his service to A&M. Johnson's 876 wins are the most in Texas A&M history. Johnson led the Aggies to a 37–29 (.561) postseason record in 13 appearances.

In 1989, the Aggies put together a 58–7 record (17–4 in SWC play) and were SWC co-champions. The Aggies won the SWC tournament and hosted a regional at Olsen Field, which included Jackson State, BYU, South Alabama, and number-12 LSU. The Aggies exploded in the first three games, outscoring their opponents 65–13 before they were upset by LSU twice, ending one of the most remarkable seasons in A&M history. Despite not advancing to the College World Series, the Aggies finished the year number two overall in the final Baseball America poll (behind Wichita State, winner of the CWS). The Aggies defeated number-three Texas four out of five times (with two wins coming on walk-off home runs), including twice in the SWC tournament.

Johnson led the Aggies to the College World Series in 1993. The Aggies won the Southwest Conference championship and swept through the Central I Regional in College Station (defeating Yale, Lamar, UCLA, and North Carolina) at Olsen Field to advance to Omaha for the third time. A&M defeated Kansas, 5–1, for the second CWS win in A&M history. Notable stars on the team included Jeff Granger (who holds the single-game strikeout record at A&M with 21), Brian Thomas, Chris Clemons, Trey Moore, and Kelly Wunsch.

The Aggies again advanced to the College World Series in 1999, led by Daylan Holt, Steven Truitt, John Scheschuk, Dell Lindsey, Casey Fossum and Luke Cicalese. In the College Station regional, the Aggies lost to Long Beach State in game 2 before defeating Ole Miss and Long Beach State twice to advance to the super regionals, where they faced number-17 Clemson. The Aggies defeated Clemson in a best of three series, 2–1, earning the team's fourth trip to the College World Series.

=== Rob Childress era (2006–2021) ===
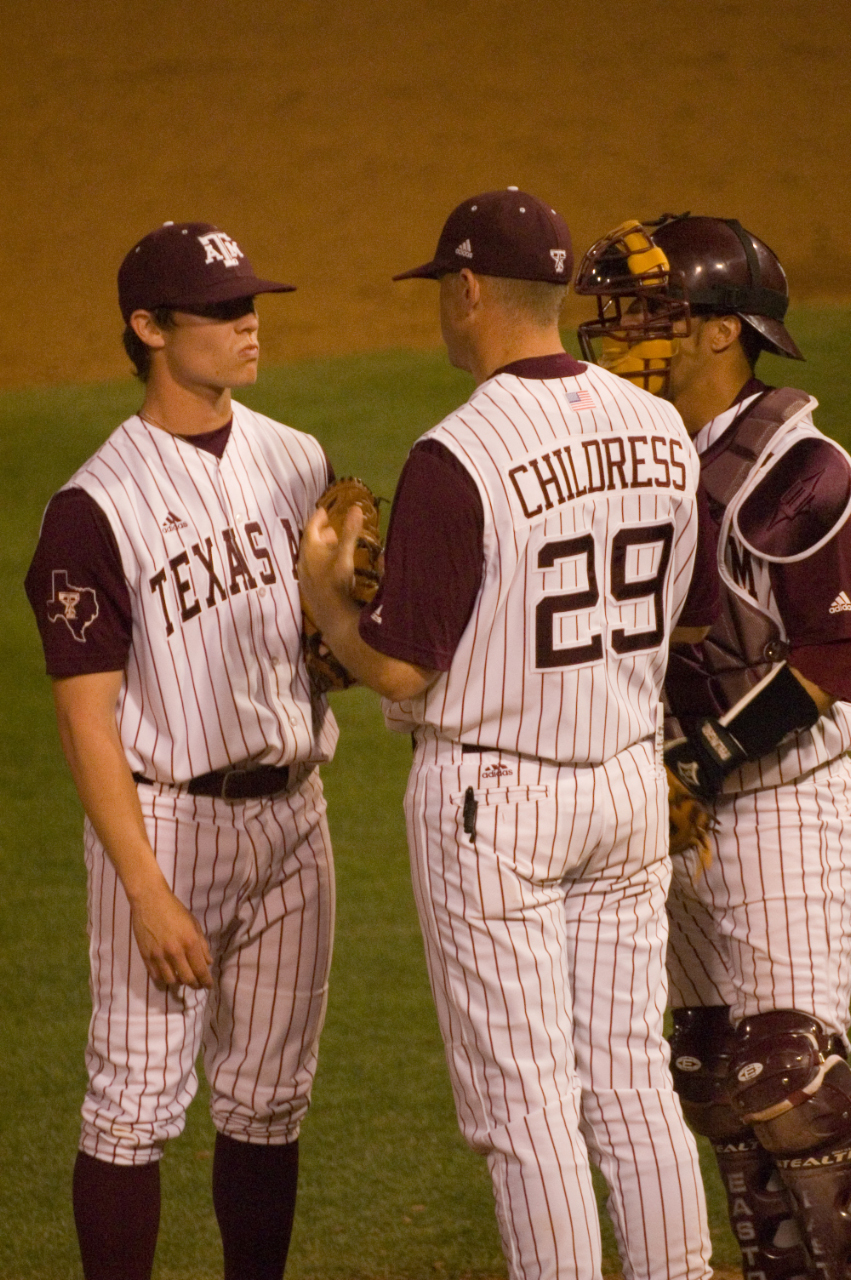
Head Coach Rob Childress on the mound, instructing an Aggie pitcher.

In 2006, Texas A&M hired Nebraska associate head coach and pitching coach Rob Childress to take over the program. After struggling to a losing record his first year, Childress guided the Aggies to a 597–306–2 (.660) record, two Big 12 championships (2010 and 2011), one Southeastern Conference championship (2016), and College World Series appearances in 2011 and 2017. Childress led the Aggies to the postseason 13 years in a row (2007–2019, the longest streak in Aggie history).

The Aggies advanced to the 2011 College World Series, led by Michael Wacha, Ross Stripling, John Stilson, Tyler Naquin, Jacob House, and Matt Juengel. A&M faced Missouri in the final game of the 2011 Big 12 Conference baseball tournament. Missouri took an early 6–0 lead. The Aggies fought their way back, and while down 9–8 in the bottom of the 9th, Gregg Alcazar tied the game on a 3–2, 2-out, RBI single to send the game to extra innings. The Aggies capped off the rally by winning it in the bottom of the 10th with a walk-off home run by Andrew Collazo, earning him the award of Most Outstanding Player. Jacob House, Kevin Gonzalez, Tyler Naquin, and Michael Wacha were named to the All-Tournament team. Texas A&M won the College Station regional with wins over Wright State, Seton Hall, and Arizona to advance to the super regional at Tallahassee to face the fifth national seed, Florida State. A&M won the first game 6–2, but was blasted in game 2, losing 23–9. The Aggies won the rubber match 11–2 to advance to the College World Series. The Aggies lost to eventual champion South Carolina in a very close game, 5–4.

Following a 2021 season that saw the Aggies finish in last place in the SEC, Athletic Director Ross Bjork announced that the school would not renew Childress' contract for 2022. Childress's 622 victories ranked third in school history at the time of his dismissal.

=== Jim Schlossnagle era (2022–2024) ===
On June 9, 2021, Jim Schlossnagle was named the head baseball coach of the Aggies. The Schlossnagle-led Aggies had a regular-season record of 35–17 and finished first in the SEC West in his first season at the helm, earning Texas A&M the number-five national seed. In the College Station regional, A&M hosted Oral Roberts, Louisiana-Lafayette, and TCU. The Aggies and Horned Frogs met in the regional final with the Aggies beating Schlossnagle's former team 15–9 to advance to the super regionals and host the 12th-seeded Louisville Cardinals. Texas A&M won both games against Louisville to advance to their seventh College World Series. In the College World Series, Texas A&M lost their opener to Oklahoma, 13–8, but won their next two games against Texas and Notre Dame to advance to the bracket-1 final against Oklahoma.

In 2024, the Aggies returned to Omaha as the number 3 overall seed. Schlossnagle notably led the Aggie baseball team to the final of the 2024 College World Series against the number 1 overall seed Tennessee. The Aggies won game 1 of the finals by a score of 9–5, but fell to the Volunteers in game 2 and game 3. Schlossnagle departed for an opportunity at rival Texas on June 25, 2024.

=== Micheal Earley era (2025–Present) ===
On June 30, 2024, less than a week after Schlossnagle's departure for Texas, it was announced that his assistant Michael Earley would hired as the next baseball coach for the Aggies.

== Stadium ==
The Aggies play at Olsen Field at Blue Bell Park, named in honor of C. E. "Pat" Olsen, a 1923 graduate of Texas A&M University and a former baseball player in the New York Yankees farm system. The field opened in 1978 and underwent major renovation after the 2011 season. Average attendance in 2011 was just under 4000 per game. The stadium can hold up to 6100 people.

== Head coaches ==
Years	Coach	Record
1904–1908	Wirt Spencer	47–28–3
1909–1914	Charley Moran	48–46–5
1915	Con Lucid	16–5
1916–1919	D. V. Graves	48–24–3
1920–1921	Dana X. Bible	29–10–1
1922	Gene Cochrehan	9–8
1923–1924	H. H. House	18–25–2
1925–1927	Claude Rothgeb	37–22–2
1928–1929	R. D. Countryman	22–17–3
1930–1935	Grady Higginbotham	64–48–3
1936–1937	Jules V. Sikes	25–17–2
1938–1941; 1948–1950	Marty Karow	95–70–2
1942; 1946–1947	Lil Dimmit	49–18
1943–1944	Homer Norton	18–16
1945	A. E. Jones	3–11
1951–1958	Beau Bell	98–104–1
1959–1984	Tom Chandler	660–329–10
1985–2005	Mark Johnson	876–431–3
2006–2021	Rob Childress	622–336–3
2022–2024	Jim Schlossnagle	135–62
2024–present	Michael Earley	59-33

== Year-by-year results ==
Information Source:

Year-by-Year Results

Year	Coach	Record	Conference Record	Postseason
1894	Unknown	3–1		
No team from 1895 through 1903.
Wirt Spencer (Independent) (1904–1908)
1904	Wirt Spencer	9–3		
1905	Wirt Spencer	11–5		
1906	Wirt Spencer	12–8		
1907	Wirt Spencer	8–4–2		
1908	Wirt Spencer	7–8–1		
Charley Moran (Independent) (1909–1914)
1909	Charley Moran	8–11		
1910	Charley Moran	7–9–1		
1911	Charley Moran	7–9–1		
1912	Charley Moran	14–5–1		
1913	Charley Moran	6–6		
1914	Charley Moran	6–6–2		
Con Lucid (Southwest Conference) (1915)
1915	Con Lucid	16–5	6–5 (2nd)	
D. V. Graves (Southwest Conference) (1916–1919)
1916	D. V. Graves	17–8	8–7 (3rd)	
1917	D. V. Graves	9–5–3	2–4 (3rd)	
1918	D. V. Graves	14–5	4–4 (2nd)	
1919	D. V. Graves	8–6	4–4 (2nd)	
Dana X. Bible (Southwest Conference) (1920–1921)
1920	Dana X. Bible	12–6–1	8–4 (2nd)	
1921	Dana X. Bible	17–4	11–3 (2nd)	
Gene Cochrehan (Southwest Conference) (1922)
1922	Gene Cochrehan	9–8	6–6 (3rd)	
H. H. House (Southwest Conference) (1923–1924)
1923	H. H. House	9–12–2	9–8–2 (4th)	
1924	H. H. House	9–13	7–10 (5th)	
Claude Rothgeb (Southwest Conference) (1923–1927)
1925	Claude Rothgeb	6–12	3–9 (7th)	
1926	Claude Rothgeb	16–4–2	8–2 (2nd)	
1927	Claude Rothgeb	16–7	10–6 (2nd)	
R. D. Countryman (Southwest Conference) (1928–1929)
1928	R. D. Countryman	8–9–1	9–7 (3rd)	
1929	R. D. Countryman	14–8–2	9–7 (3rd)	
R. G. Higginbotham (Southwest Conference) (1930–1935)
1930	R. G. Higginbotham	16–6	8–6 (4th)	
1931	R. G. Higginbotham	12–6	9–1 (1st)	
1932	R. G. Higginbotham	7–11–1	5–11 (5th)	
1933	R. G. Higginbotham	9–10	5–5 (3rd)	
1934	R. G. Higginbotham	10–7–1	9–3 (1st)	
1935	R. G. Higginbotham	10–8–1	5–6 (2nd)	
Jules V. Sikes (Southwest Conference) (1936–1937)
1936	Jules V. Sikes	10–12–1	8–5–1 (2nd)	
1937	J. V. Sikes	15–5–1	13–2 (1st)	
Marty Karow (Southwest Conference) (1938–1941)
1938	Marty Karow	11–10	10–5 (3rd)	
1939	Marty Karow	9–14–2	8–7 (T-2nd)	
1940	Marty Karow	11–10	7–5 (2nd)	
1941	Marty Karow	11–10	10–4 (2nd)	
Lil Dimmit (Southwest Conference) (1942)
1942	Lil Dimmit	19–3	13–2 (1st)	
Homer Norton (Southwest Conference) (1943–1944)
1943	Homer Norton	12–6	6–2 (T-1st)	
1944	Homer Norton	6–10	No SWC champions (World War II)	
A.E. "Pete" Jones (Southwest Conference) (1945)
1945	A.E. "Pete" Jones	3–11	1–10 (5th)	
Lil Dimmit (Southwest Conference) (1946–1947)
1946	Lil Dimmit	16–7	7–8 (3rd)	
1947	Lil Dimmit	14–8	8–6 (3rd)	
Marty Karow (Southwest Conference) (1948–1950)
1948	Marty Karow	19–7	11–4 (2nd)	
1949	Marty Karow	17–8	10–4 (2nd)	
1950	Marty Karow	17–11	9–5 (2nd)	
Beau Bell (Southwest Conference) (1951–1958)
1951	Beau Bell	21–11	11–4 (T-1st)	NCAA playoffs College World Series
1952	Beau Bell	10–19–1	6–9 (T-4th)	
1953	Beau Bell	10–15	6–9 (4th)	
1954	Beau Bell	11–13	7–7 (4th)	
1955	Beau Bell	20–7	13–2 (1st)	NCAA playoffs
1956	Beau Bell	10–13	5–9 (5th)	
1957	Beau Bell	5–15	4–10 (6th)	
1958	Beau Bell	11–11	6–8 (4th)	
Tom Chandler (Southwest Conference) (1959–1984)
1959	Tom Chandler	18–9	11–4 (1st)	NCAA playoffs
1960	Tom Chandler	5–17–1	1–11 (6th)	
1961	Tom Chandler	14–10–1	6–8 (T-4th)	
1962	Tom Chandler	18–7	11–4 (2nd)	
1963	Tom Chandler	15–10–1	9–6 (3rd)	
1964	Tom Chandler	19–8–1	12–3 (1st)	NCAA playoffs College World Series
1965	Tom Chandler	16–7	10–5 (2nd)	
1966	Tom Chandler	20–8–2	9–6 (T-1st)	
1967	Tom Chandler	17–11–1	7–8 (4th)	
1968	Tom Chandler	21–7	10–5 (3rd)	
1969	Tom Chandler	15–11	7–8 (5th)	
1970	Tom Chandler	25–9	13–4 (2nd)	
1971	Tom Chandler	31–9	12–6 (2nd)	
1972	Tom Chandler	27–13	10–8 (4th)	
1973	Tom Chandler	19–9	9–8 (3rd)	
1974	Tom Chandler	31–13	17–7 (2nd)	
1975	Tom Chandler	32–15–1	17–7 (2nd)	NCAA Regional
1976	Tom Chandler	40–13	15–6 (2nd)	NCAA Regional
1977	Tom Chandler	37–16	18–4 (1st)	NCAA Regional
1978	Tom Chandler	39–16	19–5 (1st)	NCAA Regional
1979	Tom Chandler	30–20	13–10 (4th)	
1980	Tom Chandler	38–14	17–6 (2nd)	
1981	Tom Chandler	35–16–1	10–10–1 (5th)	
1982	Tom Chandler	33–19–1	10–10–1 (4th)	
1983	Tom Chandler	24–21	4–17 (8th)	
1984	Tom Chandler	41–21	13–8 (3rd)	NCAA Regional
Mark Johnson (Southwest Conference) (1985–1996)
1985	Mark Johnson	39–16	12–9 (T-4th)	
1986	Mark Johnson	45–23	16–5 (T-1st)	NCAA Regional
1987	Mark Johnson	44–22-1	14–7 (3rd)	NCAA Regional
1988	Mark Johnson	52–15	17–4 (2nd)	NCAA Regional
1989	Mark Johnson	58–7	17–4 (T-1st)	NCAA Regional
1990	Mark Johnson	43–17	11–10 (5th)	
1991	Mark Johnson	44–23	13–8 (2nd)	NCAA Regional
1992	Mark Johnson	41–20	22–14 (2nd)	NCAA Regional
1993	Mark Johnson	53–11	15–3 (1st)	NCAA Regional Champions; College World Series
1994	Mark Johnson	31–22	6–12 (T-5th)	
1995	Mark Johnson	44–22–1	15–9 (T-2)	NCAA Regional
1996	Mark Johnson	37–21	12–12 (3rd)	
Mark Johnson (Big 12 Conference) (1997–2005)
1997	Mark Johnson	39–22	19–11 (3rd)	NCAA Regional
1998	Mark Johnson	46–20	21–9 (1st)	NCAA Regional
1999	Mark Johnson	52–18	23–6 (1st)	NCAA Regional Champions; NCAA Super Regional Champions; College World Series
2000	Mark Johnson	23–35	11–19 (8th)	
2001	Mark Johnson	33–27	15–15 (6th)	
2002	Mark Johnson	35–24	13–14 (8th)	
2003	Mark Johnson	45–19	19–8 (2nd)	NCAA Regional
2004	Mark Johnson	42–22	14–12 (5th)	NCAA Regional Champions; NCAA Super Regional
2005	Mark Johnson	30–25–1	9–18 (9th)	
Rob Childress (Big 12 Conference) (2006–2012)
2006	Rob Childress	25–30–1	6–20–1 (10th)	
2007	Rob Childress	48–19	13–13 (5th)	NCAA Regional Champions; NCAA Super Regional
2008	Rob Childress	46–19	19–8 (1st)	NCAA Regional Champions; NCAA Super Regional
2009	Rob Childress	37–24	14–13 (6th)	NCAA Regional
2010	Rob Childress	43–20–1	14–12–1 (4th)	NCAA Regional
2011	Rob Childress	42–18	19–8 (T-1st)	NCAA Regional Champions; NCAA Super Regional Champions; College World Series
2012	Rob Childress	43–18	16–8 (2nd)	NCAA Regional
Rob Childress (Southeastern Conference) (2013–2021)
2013	Rob Childress	34–29	13–16 (6th West)	NCAA Regional
2014	Rob Childress	36–26	14–16 (5th West)	NCAA Regional
2015	Rob Childress	50–14	18–10 (2nd West)	NCAA Regional Champions; NCAA Super Regional
2016	Rob Childress	49–16	20–10 (2nd West)	NCAA Regional Champions; NCAA Super Regional
2017	Rob Childress	41–23	16–14 (4th West)	NCAA Regional Champions; NCAA Super Regional Champions; College World Series
2018	Rob Childress	40–22	13–17 (6th West)	NCAA Regional
2019	Rob Childress	39–23–1	16–13–1 (4th West)	NCAA Regional
2020	Rob Childress	15–3	0–0 (1st West)	Postseason canceled
2021	Rob Childress	29–27	9–21 (7th West)	
Jim Schlossnagle (Southeastern Conference) (2022–2024)
2022	Jim Schlossnagle	44–20	19–11 (1st West)	NCAA Regional Champions; NCAA Super Regional Champions; College World Series
2023	Jim Schlossnagle	38–27	14–16 (5th West)	NCAA Regional
2024	Jim Schlossnagle	53–15	19–11 (2nd West)	NCAA Regional Champions; NCAA Super Regional Champions; College World Series Runner-Up
Michael Earley (Southeastern Conference) (2025–present)
2025	Michael Earley	30–26	11–19 (14th)	
2026	Michael Earley	41–16	18–11 (3rd)	NCAA Regional
Total:		2,984–1,662–43		
National champions College World Series participants Conference regular-season champion Conference regular-season and conference tournament champion Division regular-season champion Division regular-season and conference tournament champion Conference tournament champion

== Texas A&M in the NCAA tournament ==
- The NCAA Division I baseball tournament started in 1947.
- The format of the tournament has changed through the years.

Year	Record	Pct	Notes
1951	3–3	.500	District VI playoffs College World Series;
1955	1–2	.333	District VI playoffs;
1959	0–2	.000	District VI playoffs;
1964	0–2	.000	College World Series;
1975	1–2	.333	Norman Regional;
1976	2–2	.500	Edinburg, TX Regional;
1977	0–2	.000	Norman Regional;
1978	2–2	.500	Ann Arbor Regional;
1984	1–2	.333	Stillwater Regional;
1986	1–2	.333	Tallahassee Regional;
1987	3–2	.600	Starkville Regional;
1988	2–2	.500	Starkville Regional;
1989	3–2	.600	College Station Regional,
1991	2–2	.500	Baton Rouge Regional;
1992	3–2	.600	Gainesville Regional;
1993	5–2	.714	College Station Regional, def. Yale, def. UCLA, def. Lamar, def. North Carolina; Regional Champions; College World Series; def. Kansas, def. by LSU (Eventual National Champion) and Long Beach State
1995	4–2	.667	Coral Gables Regional; def. by (14) Florida International, def. UMass, def. (14) Florida International, def. North Carolina, def. (6) Miami, def. by (6) Miami
1997	0–2	.000	Palo Alto Regional; def. by Fresno State and (6) Stanford
1998	3–2	.600	College Station Regional; def. UNC Charlotte, def. Mississippi State, def. by Mississippi State, def. Washington, def. by Mississippi State
1999	6–4	.600	College Station Regional, def. Monmouth, def. by Long Beach State, def. Washington, def. Long Beach State, def. Long Beach State; Regional Champions; College Station Super Regional, def. Clemson, def. by Clemson, def. Clemson; Super Regional champions College World Series; def. by (3) Florida State and (4) Cal State Fullerton
2003	2–2	.500	College Station Regional, def. Oral Roberts, def. Alabama, def. by Houston twice
2004	3–3	.500	Rice regional, def. Lamar, def. Texas Southern, def. by (4) Rice, def. (4)Rice; Regional Champion; Baton Rouge Super Regional; def. by (8) LSU twice
2007	4–3	.571	College Station Regional, def. Le Moyne, def. by (21) Louisiana-Lafayette, def. Ohio State, def. (21) Louisiana-Lafayette, def. (21) Louisiana-Lafayette; Regional Champion; Houston Super Regional; def. by (1) Rice
2008	3–3	.500	College Station Regional, def. UIC, def. Houston, def. by Houston, def. Houston; Regional Champion; Houston Super Regional; def. by (5) Rice
2009	1–2	.333	Fort Worth Regional; def. by (25) Oregon State, def. Wright State, def. by (25) Oregon State
2010	3–2	.600	Coral Gables Regional, def. Florida International, def. by (11) Miami. def. Dartmouth, def. (11) Miami, def. by (11) Miami
2011	5–4	.556	College Station Regional, def. Wright State, def. Seton Hall, def. by Arizona, def. Arizona; Regional Champion; Tallahassee Super Regional; def. Florida State; College World Series; def. by (4) South Carolina and California
2012	1–2	.333	College Station Regional; def. Dayton, def. by Ole Miss, def. by TCU
2013	2–2	.500	Corvallis Regional; def. by UC-Santa Barbara, def. UT-San Antonio, def. UC-Santa Barbara, def. by (5)Oregon State
2014	3–2	.600	Houston Regional; def. by Texas, def. George Mason, def. Rice, def. Texas, def. by Texas
2015	5–3	.625	College Station Regional; def. Texas Southern, def. by California, def. Coastal Carolina, def. California, def. California; Regional Champion; Fort Worth Super Regional; def. by TCU
2016	4–2	.667	College Station Regional; def. Binghamton, def. Wake Forest, def. Minnesota; Regional Champion; College Station Super Regional; def. by TCU
2017	5–2	.714	Houston Regional; def. Baylor, def. Iowa, def Houston; Regional Champion; College Station Super Regional; def. Davidson; College World Series; def. by (7) Louisville and (6) TCU
2018	1–2	.333	Austin Regional; def Indiana, def. by (13) Texas, def. by Indiana
2019	2–2	.500	Morgantown Regional; def Fordham, def. by Duke, def (15) West Virginia, def. by Duke
2022	7–2	.779	College Station Regional; def. Oral Roberts, def. Louisiana, def. TCU; Regional Champion; College Station Super Regional; def. (12) Louisville; College World Series; def. by OU, def. Texas, def. Notre Dame, def. by OU.
2023	2–2	.500	Stanford Regional; def. Cal State Fullerton, def. (8) Stanford, def. by (8) Stanford twice.
2024	9–2	.818	College Station Regional; def. Grambling, def. Texas, def. Louisiana; Regional Champion; College Station Super Regional; def. Oregon; College World Series; def. Florida, def. (2) Kentucky, def. Florida, def. (1) Tennessee. def. by (1) Tennessee, def. by (1) Tennessee.
2026	0–0	.000	College Station Regional; def. Lamar, def. Texas State,
TOTALS	101–78	.564

- Note: In 1951, Texas A&M participated in the district playoffs, which they won, and moved onto the College World Series. Prior to 1954, district playoff games were not considered a part of the National Collegiate Baseball Championship, and thus are not counted in Texas A&M's NCAA tournament record.

== Texas A&M's First-team All-Americans ==
Player	Position	Year(s)	Selectors
Charles "Mel" Work	Pitcher	1951†	ABCA
Pat Hubert	Pitcher	1951†	ABCA
Mike McClure	Third Base	1965†	ABCA
Bob Long	Outfield	1969†	ABCA
Dave Elmendorf	Outfield	1971†	ABCA
Jim Hacker	Second Base	1974†	ABCA
Scott Livingstone	Designated hitter	1987†	BA
Jeff Brantley	Pitcher	1985†	ABCA, BA
Terry Taylor	Second Base	1989†	BA
John Byington	Third Base	1989†	ABCA, BA
Jeff Granger	Pitcher	1993†	ABCA, BA
Brian Thomas	Outfield	1993	ABCA
John Curl	Designated hitter	1995	CB
Daylan Holt	Outfielder	1999†	ABCA, BA
Scott Beerer	Utility player	2003	CB, BA
Barret Loux	Pitcher	2010	BA
Ross Stripling	Pitcher	2011	ABCA
Boomer White	Third Base	2016	BA
Ryne Birk	Second Base	2016	BA
Braden Shewmake	Second Base	2017	NCBWA, CB
Asa Lacy	Starting Pitcher	2020	CB
Will Frizzell	First Base	2021	ABCA
Evan Aschenbeck	Pitcher	2024	ABCA, NCBWA, D1B
Jace LaViolette	Outfielder	2024	BA, NCBWA, D1B
Braden Montgomery	Outfielder	2024	ABCA, NCBWA
Source:"SEC All-Americas". secsports.com. Archived from the original on 2008-05-28. ABCA: American Baseball Coaches Association BA: Baseball America CB: Collegiate Baseball NCBWA: National Collegiate Baseball Writers Association D1B: D1Baseball † Denotes consensus All-American

== Players selected in the MLB draft ==
Note: the first Major League Baseball draft was held in 1965.

Year	Name	Position	Round	Overall	Team	Notes
1970	Doug Rau	LHP	1st	7th	LAD	retired – LAD, LAA
1971	Dave Elmendorf	OF	1st		NYY	Played in the NFL
1971	Billy Hodge	C	1st	22nd	SDP	
1978	Bobby Bonner	SS	3rd	74th	BAL	
1979	Mark Thurmond	P	5th	118th	SDP	retired – SD, DET, BAL, SF
1988	Scott Livingstone	IF	2nd	56th	DET	retired – DET, SD, STL, MON
1989	Chuck Knoblauch	IF	1st	25th	MIN	retired – MIN, NYY, KC
1990	Brent Gilbert	RHP	19th	499th	NYY	
1993	Jeff Granger	LHP	1st	5th	KCR	retired – PIT, KC
1993	Kelly Wunsch	LHP	1st	26th	MIL	retired – CHW, LAD
1995	Chad Alexander	OF	3rd	41st	HOU	retired – HOU, SEA. DET
1995	Kevin Beirne	OF	11th	308th	CHW	retired – CHW, TOR, LAD
1996	Chad Allen	OF	4th	97th	MIN	retired – MIN, CLE, FLA, TEX
1997	Jeff Bailey	OF/1B	2nd	64th	FLA	retired – BOS
1998	Jason Tyner	OF	1st	21st	NYM	retired – TB, MIN, NYM, CLE
1998	Ryan Rupe	RHP	6th	192nd	TB	retired – TB, BOS
1999	Chance Caple	RHP	1st	30th	STL	
1999	Casey Fossum	LHP	1st	48th	BOS	retired – BOS, ARI, TBD, DET, NYM
1999	John Scheschuk	1B	7th	232rd	SDP	
2002	Eric Reed	OF	9th	262nd	FLA	retired – FLA
2003	Logan Kensing	RHP	2nd	53rd	FLA	retired – FLA, WAS, COL, SEA, DET
2004	Zach Jackson	LHP	1st	32nd	TOR	retired – MIL, CLE
2004	Justin Ruggiano	OF	25th	748th	LAD	retired – TBR, MIA, CHC, SEA, LAD, TEX, NYM, SFG
2005	Cliff Pennington	IF	1st	21st	OAK	retired – OAK, ARI, TOR, LAA, CIN
2005	Robert Ray	RHP	7th	206th	TOR	
2006	Austin Creps	RHP	6th	191st	CLE	
2007	Brandon Hicks	IF	3rd	108th	ATL	retired – ATL, OAK, SFG
2007	David Newmann	LHP	4th	125th	TBR	
2007	Kyle Nicholson	RHP	7th	224th	SFG	
2008	Jose Duran	IF	6th	188th	MIL	
2009	Alex Wilson	RHP	2nd	77th	BOS	retired – BOS, DET, MIL
2009	Brooks Raley	LHP	6th	200th	CHC	current club – NYM
2009	Anthony Vasquez	LHP	18th	533rd	SEA	
2010	Barret Loux	RHP	1st	6th	ARI	
2010	Brodie Greene	IF	4th	127th	CIN	
2011	John Stilson	RHP	3rd	108th	TOR	
2012	Tyler Naquin	OF	1st	15th	CLE	current Free Agent Last Club- CWS
2012	Michael Wacha	RHP	1st	19th	STL	current club – KC
2012	Ross Stripling	RHP	5th	176th	LAD	current club – OAK
2013	Mikey Reynolds	IF	5th	163rd	ATL	
2013	Kyle Martin	RHP	9th	263rd	BOS	retired – BOS
2014	Daniel Mengden	RHP	4th	106th	HOU	current club – Kia Tigers (KBO)
2014	Corey Ray	RHP	5th	153rd	KC	
2014	Troy Stein	C	10th	293rd	COL	
2015	A. J. Minter	LHP	3rd	75th	ATL	current club – ATL
2015	Grayson Long	RHP	3rd	104th	LAA	
2015	Blake Allemand	SS	5th	151st	MIL	
2015	Logan Taylor	3B	12th	365th	BOS	
2015	Matt Kent	LHP	13th	381st	BOS	
2016	Nick Banks	OF	4th	124th	WAS	
2016	Jace Vines	RHP	4th	133rd	KCR	
2016	Ryan Hendrix	RHP	5th	138th	CIN	current club – KCR
2016	Mark Ecker	RHP	5th	145th	DET	
2016	J.B. Moss	OF	7th	199th	ATL	
2016	Michael Barash	C	9th	276th	LAA	
2016	Boomer White	3B	10th	294th	SDP	
2016	Andrew Vinson	RHP	10th	306th	LAA	
2016	Ryne Birk	2B	13th	377th	HOU	
2016	Kyle Simonds	RHP	14th	424th	WAS	
2016	Hunter Melton	1B	18th	530th	COL	
2016	Ronnie Gideon	1B	23rd	681st	MIL	
2017	Corbin Martin	RHP	2nd	56th	HOU	current club – BAL
2017	Brigham Hill	RHP	5th	163rd	WAS	
2017	Nick Choruby	OF	18th	553rd	WAS	
2017	Turner Larkins	RHP	21st	639th	TOR	
2017	Kaylor Chafin	LHP	32nd	967th	NYM	
2018	Mitchell Kilkenny	RHP	2nd	76th	COL	
2018	Nolan Hoffman	RHP	5th	148th	SEA	current club – PHI
2018	Cason Sherrod	RHP	7th	207th	MIA	
2018	Michael Helman	2B	11th	334th	MIN	current club – TEX
2018	Stephen Kolek	RHP	11th	344th	LAD	current club – KCR
2019	Braden Shewmake	SS	1st	21st	ATL	current club – NYY
2019	John Doxakis	LHP	2nd	61st	TBR	
2019	Kasey Kalich	RHP	4th	127th	ATL	
2019	Mason Cole	RHP	27th	805th	TEX	
2020	Asa Lacy	LHP	1st	4th	KCR	
2020	Zach DeLoach	OF	2nd	43rd	SEA	current club – CWS
2020	Christian Roa	RHP	2nd	48th	CIN	
2021	Dustin Saenz	LHP	4th	112th	WAS	
2021	Bryce Miller	RHP	4th	113th	SEA	current club – SEA
2021	Will Frizzell	1B	8th	233rd	WAS	
2021	Chandler Jozwiak	LHP	13th	389th	MIA	
2022	Micah Dallas	RHP	8th	244th	OAK	
2022	Dylan Rock	OF	8th	248th	TOR	
2022	Joseph Menefee	LHP	20th	603rd	CIN	
2023	Hunter Hass	INF	4th	120th	TBR	
2023	Nathan Dettmer	RHP	5th	149th	OAK	
2023	Trevor Werner	INF	7th	199th	KCR	
2023	Jack Moss	INF	11th	318th	CIN	
2023	Brandyn Garcia	LHP	11th	337th	SEA	current club – ARI
2023	Will Johnston	LHP	13th	376th	OAK	
2024	Braden Montgomery	OF/RHP	1st	12th	BOS	current club – CWS
2024	Chris Cortez	RHP	2nd	45th	LAA	
2024	Ryan Prager	LHP	3rd	81st	LAA	
2024	Tanner Jones	RHP	6th	167th	KCR	
2024	Jackson Appel	C	6th	169th	CWS	
2024	Ali Camarillo	INF	12th	346th	OAK	
2024	Evan Aschenbeck	LHP	13th	392nd	CHC	
2025	Jace LaViolette	OF	1st	27th	CLE	
2025	Justin Lamkin	P	2nd	71st	KCR	
2025	Kaeden Kent	SS	3rd	103rd	NYY	
2025	Myles Patton	P	7th	208th	BOS	
2025	Kaiden Wilson	P	9th	258th	MIA	
2025	Wyatt Henseler	3B	9th	261st	WSH	
2025	Ryan Prager	P	9th	282nd	CLE	
2025	Luke Jackson	P	11th	327th	TBR	
2026	Chris Hacopian	2B	1st	11th	WSH	
2026	Caden Sorrell	OF	2nd	62st	CHC	
2026	Gavin Grahovac	1B	3rd	81st	LAA	
2026	Shane Sdao	P	4th	120th	NYM	
2026	Bear Harrison	C	5th	160th	NYY	
2026	Weston Moss	P	11th	316st	WSH	
2026	Jake Duer	OF	18th	536th	ARI	
2026	Clayton Freshcorn	P	19th	564th	STL	

== Other notable players ==
- Rip Collins (1896–1968), played in the American League from 1920 to 1931
- Pat Hubert (1926–2006), 1951 collegiate All-American, later played two years in minor league baseball
- Jim Kendrick (1893–1941), two-time NFL champion (1922, 1927)
- Wally Moon (1930–2018), played in the National League from 1954 to 1965
- Topper Rigney (1897–1972), played in the American League from 1922 to 1927
- Yale Lary (1930–2017), NFL Hall of Fame inductee, 9-time pro-bowler, 3-time NFL champion

== See also ==
- List of NCAA Division I baseball programs
