= Chris Hacopian =

American baseball player (born 2004)

Washington Nationals
- Second baseman
- Born: August 30, 2004 (age 22); Gaithersburg, Maryland, U.S.
- Bats: Right Throws: Right
- Stats at Baseball Reference

Christopher Hacopian (born August 30, 2004) is an American professional baseball second baseman in the Washington Nationals organization.

== Amateur career ==
Hacopian attended Winston Churchill High School in Potomac, Maryland, where he played baseball. As a junior in 2022, he hit .539 with 12 home runs alongside pitching to a 1.15 ERA and was named the Gatorade Maryland Player of the Year. During the summer of 2023, he briefly played collegiate summer baseball with the Bethesda Big Train of the Cal Ripken Sr. Collegiate Baseball League. He originally committed to play college baseball at Wake Forest University, but flipped his commitment to the University of Maryland to play for the Terrapins.

As a freshman for Maryland in 2024, Hacopian appeared in 55 games and hit .323 with 15 home runs and 42 RBI. After the season, he played in the New England Collegiate Baseball League with the Martha's Vineyard Sharks. As a sophomore for the Terrapins in 2025, Hacopian played in 52 games and batted .375 with 14 home run and 61 RBI. Following the season's end, he entered the transfer portal, and ultimately committed to Texas A&M University to play for the Aggies. He played in the Cape Cod Baseball League with the Yarmouth–Dennis Red Sox over the summer. Hacopian missed time during the 2026 season due to a back injury as well as a getting hit by a pitch in the face which required dental surgery. He finished the season having played in 42 games with Texas A&M and had a .319 batting average, 11 home runs and 41 RBI. After the season, he was invited to attend the 2026 MLB Draft Combine at Chase Field.

== Professional career ==
Hacopian was selected by the Washington Nationals in the first round with the 11th overall pick of the 2026 Major League Baseball draft. He signed with the team on July 15, 2026, for $5.7 million.

Hacopian made his professional debut after signing with the High-A Wilmington Blue Rocks. He played in 13 games and batted .275 with one home run.

== Personal life ==
Hacopian's father, Derek, played college baseball at Maryland and was named the ACC Baseball Player of the Year in 1992. Hacopian's brother, Eddie, also played at Maryland and graduated in 2025. His mother is Melissa Hacopian.

Hacopian grew up a fan of the Washington Nationals. Recalling the Nationals' 2019 championship season after he was drafted by the team in 2026, he described NLCS MVP Howie Kendrick as his hero at the time.

Hacopian is of Armenian descent.
