= Caden Sorrell =

American baseball player (born 2005)

Chicago Cubs
- Outfielder
- Born: March 7, 2005 (age 21); Tucson, Arizona, U.S.
- Bats: Left Throws: Left
- Stats at Baseball Reference

Caden Griffin Sorrell (born March 7, 2005) is an American professional baseball outfielder in the Chicago Cubs organization. He played college baseball for the Texas A&M Aggies.

== Career ==
Sorrell attended Edward S. Marcus High School in Flower Mound, Texas. He committed to Texas A&M University to play college baseball.

As a freshman at Texas A&M in 2024, Sorrell played in 62 games with 48 starts and hit .275/.369/.555 with 11 home runs and 43 runs batted in (RBI) over 182 at-bats. In the 2024 College World Series, he hit sixth in the lineup in the finals and helped the Aggies reach the finals for the first time with a 2-run home run against Florida. As a sophomore in 2025, he played and started in only 26 games due to injury and hit .337/.430/.789 with 12 home runs and 32 RBIs over 95 at-bats. Sorrell returned to Texas A&M for his junior season in 2026. He was named a consensus preseason All-American for the season. He hit .341/.434/.743 in 56 games with 23 home runs and 65 RBIs in his final season with the Aggies and was named a Golden Spikes Award semifinalist.

Sorrell attended both the 2023 and 2026 MLB Draft Combines. He was considered a top prospect for the 2026 Major League Baseball draft. He was drafted in the 2nd round (62nd overall) in the draft by the Chicago Cubs and signed for $1.65 million.

On August 4, 2026, Sorrell made his professional debut with the single-A Myrtle Beach Pelicans in a game suspended for weather in the 3rd inning. He hit his first professional home run 3 days later.

== Personal life ==
Both of his grandfathers, Billy Sorrell and Tom Griffin, played in Major League Baseball (MLB).
