= Michael Earley =

College baseball head coach for Texas A&M

Current position
- Title: Head coach
- Team: Texas A&M
- Conference: SEC
- Record: 71–42 (.628)

Biographical details
- Born: March 15, 1988 (age 38); Anderson, Indiana, U.S.
- Education: Indiana

Playing career
- 2008–2010: Indiana
- 2010–2011: Great Falls Voyagers
- 2012: Winston-Salem Dash
- 2013: Charlotte Knights
- 2013–2014: Birmingham Barons
- 2015: Southern Illinois Miners
- Position: OF

Coaching career (HC unless noted)
- 2017–2021: Arizona State (asst.)
- 2022–2024: Texas A&M (asst.)
- 2025–present: Texas A&M

Head coaching record
- Overall: 71–42 (.628)
- Tournaments: NCAA: 2–2

Michael Earley (born March 15, 1988) is an American college baseball coach who is currently the head baseball coach at Texas A&M University.

== Education and playing career ==
Earley attended Indiana University and played for their baseball team for three seasons between 2008 and 2010. During his last year playing for the Hoosiers, Earley made the All-Big Ten Third Team. After his college career, Earley was selected in the 29th round by the Chicago White Sox. He played in the Chicago White Sox organization for six seasons between 2010 and 2015.

== Coaching career ==
=== Arizona State (2017–2021) ===
Earley began his career as an assistant head coach for the Arizona State Sun Devils, serving as their hitting coach for four of the five seasons that he was there. During his time at Arizona State, he coached under head coach Tracy Smith.

=== Texas A&M assistant (2022–2024) ===
In 2022, Earley accepted a position with the Texas A&M Aggies under head coach Jim Schlossnagle where he spent three seasons as their hitting coach.

=== Texas A&M head coach (2025–present) ===
On June 30, 2024, Earley was announced as the 21st head coach at Texas A&M University. Earley replaced Jim Schlossnagle after briefly following him to the Texas Longhorns as an assistant.

== Personal life ==
Earley was born on March 15, 1988, in Anderson, Indiana. He was a three-sport star at Anderson High School, graduating in 2006. He is married to his wife Lisa and has three kids.

== Head coaching record ==
Record table
Season	Team	Overall	Conference	Standing	Postseason
Texas A&M Aggies (Southeastern Conference) (2025–present)
2025	Texas A&M	30–26	11–19	14th	
2026	Texas A&M	41–16	18–11	3rd	NCAA Regional
Texas A&M:		71–42 (.628)	29–30 (.492)		
Total:		70–40 (.636)			
National champion Postseason invitational champion Conference regular season champion Conference regular season and conference tournament champion Division regular season champion Division regular season and conference tournament champion Conference tournament champion
