= Gavin Grahovac =

American baseball player (born 2005)

Los Angeles Angels
- Outfielder
- Born: January 2, 2005 (age 21); Orange, California, U.S.
- Bats: Right Throws: Right
- Stats at Baseball Reference

Gavin Drake Grahovac (born January 2, 2005) is an American professional baseball outfielder and third baseman in the Los Angeles Angels organization. He played college baseball for the Texas A&M Aggies.

== Amateur career ==
=== High school career ===
Grahovac grew up in Orange, California and attended Villa Park High School. He hit .343 with two home runs, four doubles and four RBI in his freshman season. He hit .411 with six home runs and 10 doubles in 2021 as a sophomore.

Grahovac was named the Orange County Baseball Player of the Year after batting .376 with 17 doubles, three triples, five home runs, and 24 RBIs as a junior. Also he was named the 2022 Los Angeles Times Player of the Year and the 2022 California State Player of the Year. Grahovac batted .350 with nine doubles, five home runs, and 19 RBIs during his senior season. Following the season, he was named the 2023 California State Player of the Year.

He was considered a top-200 prospect in the 2023 Major League Baseball draft, but he opted to withdraw from the draft and attend Texas A&M.

=== College career ===
Grahovac was a starter at both third base and as an outfielder during his 2024 freshman season with the Texas A&M Aggies. He finished the season with a school freshman record 23 home runs and 66 RBIs, having the slash line of .298/.390/.597 in 67 games. On June 22, he became the first player to hit a lead-off home run in the first game of College World Series Final. Following the season, he was named the Southeastern Conference (SEC) Freshman of the Year. Also he was named to the Freshman All-SEC Team, and 2024 Freshman All-America Team by Perfect Game, D1Baseball, and Baseball America.

Following the departure of Texas A&M head coach Jim Schlossnagle, Grahovac entered the NCAA transfer portal, but ultimately opted to return to Texas A&M for his sophomore season. In 2025, he underwent shoulder surgery, ending his sophomore season after only six games. He hit .227 with two home runs, six RBI and seven hits.

In his 2026 junior season, Grahovac slashed .339/.429/.722 with 22 home runs, 16 doubles and 74 RBI in 57 games. He led the Texas A&M Aggies with 26 multi-hit games, 76 runs scored and 78 hits. Following the season, he was named to the 2026 All-SEC First Team as a first baseman. Also he received 2026 SEC Scholar-Athlete of the Year and 2026 Marion Pugh Most Valuable Player Award.

== Professional career ==
Grahovac was selected by the Los Angeles Angels in the third round of the 2026 Major League Baseball draft, with the 81st overall pick. He signed with the team for a $1,247,500 bonus.

After the draft, Grahovac made his professional debut with the Single-A Rancho Cucamonga Quakes. He played 24 games with Rancho and slashed .304/.402/.641 with eight home runs, five doubles, a triple, 13 stolen bases and 18 RBI.

== Personal life ==
Grahovac is the son of Mike Grahovac, who was selected by the San Francisco Giants in the fourth round of the 1989 Major League Baseball draft. His cousin, Garrett Mitchell, is Major League Baseball player who was selected by the Milwaukee Brewers in the first round of the 2020 Draft.
