= Maryland Terrapins baseball =

University of Maryland baseball team

- 2026 Maryland Terrapins baseball team
- Founded: 1893
- Conference history: South Atlantic Intercollegiate Athletic Association (1907–1921) Southern Conference (1921–1953) Atlantic Coast Conference (1953–2014)
- University: University of Maryland, College Park
- Head coach: Matt Swope (3rd season)
- Conference: Big Ten
- Location: College Park, MD
- Home stadium: Shipley Field at Bob "Turtle" Smith Stadium (capacity: 2,500)
- Nickname: Terrapins
- Colors: Red, white, black, and gold

NCAA regional champions
- 2014, 2015

NCAA tournament appearances
- 1965, 1970, 1971, 2014, 2015, 2017, 2021, 2022, 2023

Conference tournament champions
- 2023

Conference regular season champions
- 1936, 1965, 1970, 1971, 2022, 2023

The Maryland Terrapins baseball team is the varsity intercollegiate baseball program of University of Maryland, College Park in College Park, Maryland, United States. The program's first season was in 1893, and it has been a member of the NCAA Division I Big Ten Conference since the start of the 2015 season. Its home venue is Shipley Field at Bob "Turtle" Smith Stadium, located on Maryland's campus. Matt Swope is the current head coach.

The Terrapins have appeared in nine NCAA tournaments. It has won one conference tournament championship and six regular season conference titles. As of the start of the 2021 Major League Baseball season, 38 former Terrapins have appeared in Major League Baseball.

== History ==
During the 2014 and 2015 seasons, Maryland made consecutive conference tournament championship game appearances and posted back-to-back campaigns of 40 or more wins, a first in school history. The Terps have made multiple appearances in various top-25 national college baseball polls in each of the last two seasons and was voted the 2015 preseason favorite to win the Big Ten Conference title, its first season competing in the league.

After failing to make the NCAA tournament for 43 years, the Terrapins earned berths in the 2014 and 2015 NCAA Division I baseball tournaments. In 2014, Maryland Baseball beat South Carolina in the Columbia Regional to advance to the NCAA tournament Super Regional round for the first time in school history. The following year, they once again advanced to the Super Regional by defeating top seed UCLA in the Los Angeles Regional. Both years they were defeated by Virginia in the Super Regional Round.

Maryland has participated in nine NCAA tournaments: 1965, 1970, 1971, 2014, 2015, 2017, 2021, 2022, and 2023. The program has won six regular season conference championships in its history. In 2023, Maryland won its first conference tournament defeating Iowa, 4–0.

== Facilities ==
=== Shipley Field at Bob "Turtle" Smith Stadium (1952–present) ===
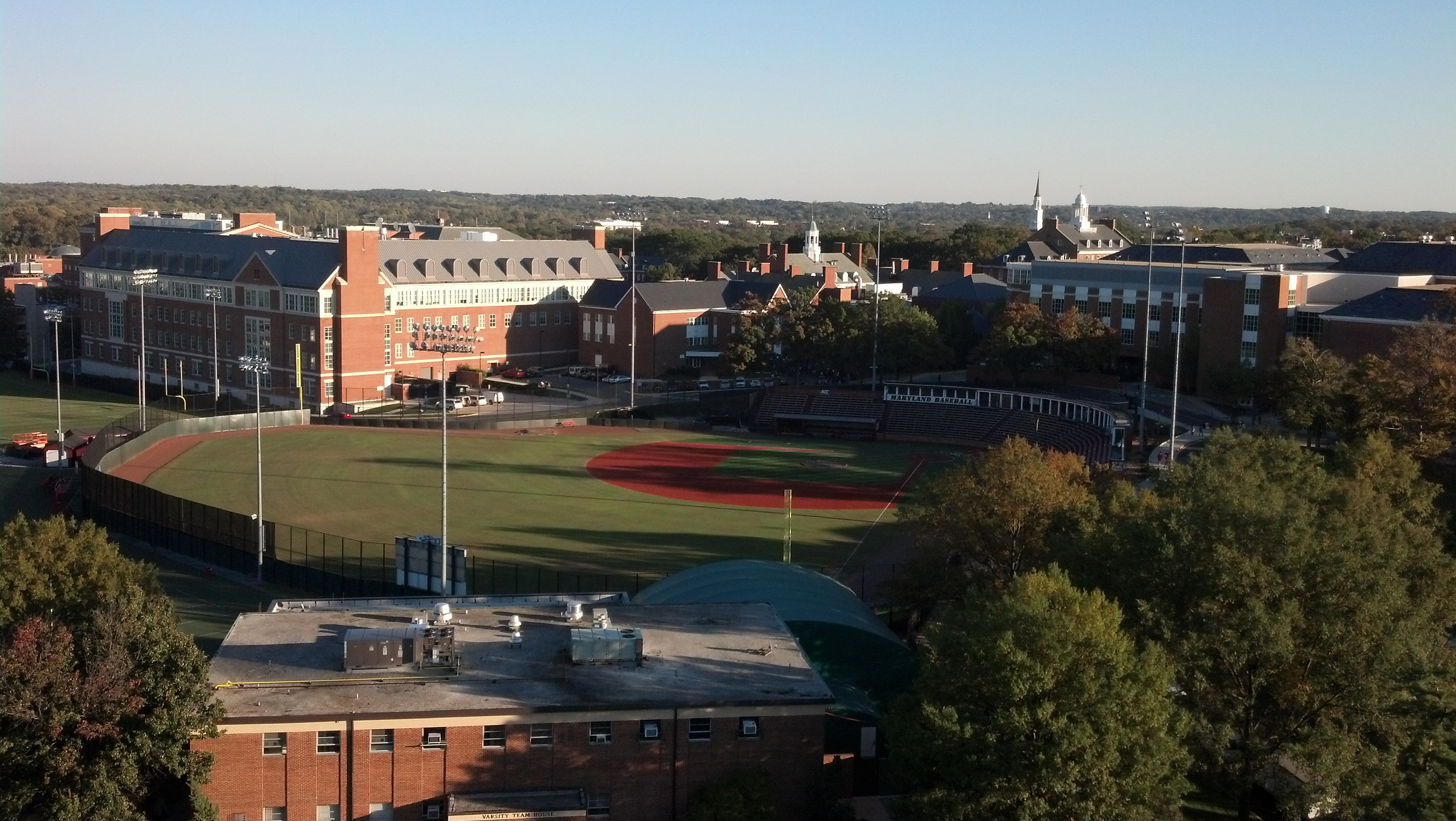
Shipley Field at Bob "Turtle" Smith Stadium, as viewed from Byrd Stadium, October 2013

Shipley Field at Bob "Turtle" Smith Stadium, often referred to simply as "The BOB", has been the home of the Maryland baseball team for more than 60 years. The team's playing field was moved to its current location in 1952, and became Shipley Field in 1956. The ballpark is located right in the heart of the Maryland campus, in between Byrd Stadium and the Artificial Turf Facility. The facility's current seating capacity is 2,500. Its playing surface is Sportexe Synthetic Turf in the infield and Bermuda Grass in the outfield and the dimensions are 320 down the left field line, 380 to center and 325 down the right field line.

In 1982, Shipley Field was the site of an exhibition game between the Terps and Earl Weaver's Baltimore Orioles. Eight years later, in 1990, the Soviet baseball team paid a visit to Shipley Field to take on the Terps in an exhibition series. The stadium has been hosting night games since a set of permanent lights were installed prior to the 1994 season. Shipley Field is named after legendary Terps' coach H. Burton Shipley, who was the Maryland skipper from 1924 to 1960.

On May 8, 2010, Shipley Field was officially dedicated as Shipley Field at Bob "Turtle" Smith Stadium in honor of former Maryland baseball player, Bob "Turtle" Smith '63. Bob and his wife Carol had previously established a fully endowed baseball scholarship, called the "Bob "Turtle" Smith & Carol B. Smith and Family Endowed Baseball Scholarship" A new turf infield, an upgraded warning track, a new brick backstop, a new outfield fence and an upgraded scoreboard were installed prior to the 2011 season.

=== Eric Milton Family Clubhouse ===
Prior to the start of Maryland's game against the Miami Hurricanes on Saturday, April 13, 2013 head coach John Szefc and the Terrapin baseball program held a dedication ceremony to unveil the Eric Milton Family Clubhouse.

The Terps' clubhouse, which is located within the Varsity Team House just beyond the left-field fence at Shipley Field at Bob "Turtle" Smith Stadium, received a facelift with significant help from former Terrapin Eric Milton (1994–96) and his family.

The renovation included the installation of 38 custom cherry-wood lockers, new carpeting and flooring, new signage, and the addition of an awards wall and a custom counter for kitchen appliances.

=== The Shell ===
In 2011, a 5,000 square foot hitting and pitching facility, nicknamed, "The Shell", was installed behind the left-field fence at Shipley Field at Bob "Turtle" Smith Stadium and adjacent to the Varsity Team House.

== Notable alumni ==
- Bosey Berger
- Tom Bradley
- Tom Brown
- Brett Cecil
- Mark Ciardi
- Bob Ferris
- Kevin Hart
- Buck Herzog
- Gene Hiser
- Vic Keen
- Charlie Keller
- Hal Keller
- Mike Knode
- Justin Maxwell
- Eric Milton
- Simon Nicholls
- Jim Norris
- Sherry Robertson
- Jeff Schaefer
- Steve Schmoll
- Ron Swoboda
- Chris "Bubba" Alleyne
- Matt Shaw
- Luke Shliger
- Nick Lorusso

=== Current MLB roster ===
Former Terrapins on current MLB rosters as of 2026.

Player	Position	Team
Matt Shaw	3B	Chicago Cubs
Brandon Lowe	2B	Pittsburgh Pirates
Sean Burke	P	Chicago White Sox

== Individual honors ==
=== All-Americans ===
Name	Position	Year	ABCA	BA	CB	NCBWA	TSN	Notes
Tom Brown	OF	1962	✓	—	—	—	—	ABCA 1st Team
Will Frazier	OF	2002	—	—	✓	—	—	CB Freshman Team
Derek Hacopian	OF	1992	✓	✓	✓	—	—	ABCA 1st Team; BA 2nd Team; CB 1st Team
John Hetrick	OF	1967	✓	—	—	—	✓	ABCA 2nd Team; TSN 1st Team
Bob Grossman	P	1972	✓	—	—	—	—	1st Team - Poll previously called American Association of College Baseball Coaches (AACBC)
Gene Hiser	OF	1970	✓	—	—	—	✓	ABCA 1st Team; TSN 1st Team
Jason Maxey	C	2002	—	—	✓	—	—	CB Freshman Team
John McCurdy	INF	2002	✓	✓	—	✓	—	ABCA 3rd Team; BA 2nd Team; NCBWA 1st Team
Jim Pitt	OF	1964	✓	—	—	—	—	ABCA 2nd Team
Dave Suave	2B	1971	✓	—	—	—	—	ABCA 3rd Team
Chris Alleyne	OF	2022		✓	✓	✓	—	NCBWA 1st Team; BA 1st Team; CB 1st Team

ABCA	American Baseball Coaches Association
BA	Baseball America
CB	Collegiate Baseball
NCBWA	National Collegiate Baseball Writers Association
TSN	The Sporting News

=== Conference Honors ===
==== ACC Player of the Year ====
Player	Position	Year
Bob Grossman	P	1972
Derek Hacopian	OF	1992

==== All-ACC ====
Name	Position	Year
Mike Baier	2B	1972
Al Baker	SS	1958
Jerry Bark	P	1965
Tom Bradley	P	1967, 68
Ernie Berliner	1B	1954
Don Brown	1B	1960, 61
Tom Brown	1B/OF	1961, 62
Anthony Buffone	UTL	2004
Darrell Carradini	DH	1976
Pat Clarke	OF	1959
Frank Cooper	SS	1959, 60
Phil Coddry	P	1969
Russell Duffy	P	1955
Kendall Echols	P	1983
Bob Ferris	P	1975, 76
Bob Grossman	P	1971
Tim Gordon	3B	1981
Derek Hacopian	OF	1992
Chester Hanulak	OF	1954
Brett Harman	P	2012
Grayson Harmeyer	OF	1963
Kevin Hart	P/1B	2004
Connie Hemphill	P	1954
Neil Herrick	OF	1980
John Hetrick	OF	1967
Kevin Hicks	P	1975
Gene Hiser	OF	1969, 70
Don Kerns	OF	1966
Brandon Lowe	2B	2014
John Marciano	1B/P	1996
Andy McDonald	3B	1958
Harry Martell	OF	1971
Craig Munroe	DH	2000
Bob Niffenger	DH	1977
Jim Norris	OF	1968, 69, 70
Scott Patterson	DH	1987
Jim Pitt	OF	1964
Jimmy Reed	P	2013
Dick Reitz	P	1959
Phil Rogers	C	1961
Dan Santo	3B	1959
Jeff Schaefer	2B	1981
Steve Schmoll	P	2003
Chris Smoot	1B	1992
Jake Stinnett	P	2014
David Suave	2B	1970, 71
Frank Thomas	OF	1992
Casey Trout	SS	1999
Bill Walker	OF	1955
Charlie White	OF	2013, 14

==== Big Ten Freshman of the Year ====
Player	Position	Year
Tyler Blohm	P	2017
Chris Hacopian	SS	2023

==== Big Ten Player of the Year ====
Player	Position	Year
Chris Alleyne	CF	2022
Matt Shaw	SS	2023

==== Big Ten Coach of the Year ====
Player	Year
Rob Vaughn	2022, 2023

== NCAA tournament Record ==
Year	Coach	Record	Pct	Notes
1965	Elton "Jack" Jackson	0–2	.000	District 3
1970	Elton "Jack" Jackson	1–2	.333	District 3
1971	Elton "Jack" Jackson	0–2	.000	District 3
2014	John Szefc	4–2	.667	Charlottesville Super Regional
2015	John Szefc	3–3	.500	Charlottesville Super Regional
2017	John Szefc	1–2	.333	Winston-Salem Regional
2021	Rob Vaughn	2–2	.500	Greenville Regional
2022	Rob Vaughn	3–2	.600	College Park Regional
2023	Rob Vaughn	1–2	.333	Winston-Salem Regional

== See also ==
- List of NCAA Division I baseball programs
