= Jace LaViolette =

American baseball player (born 2003)

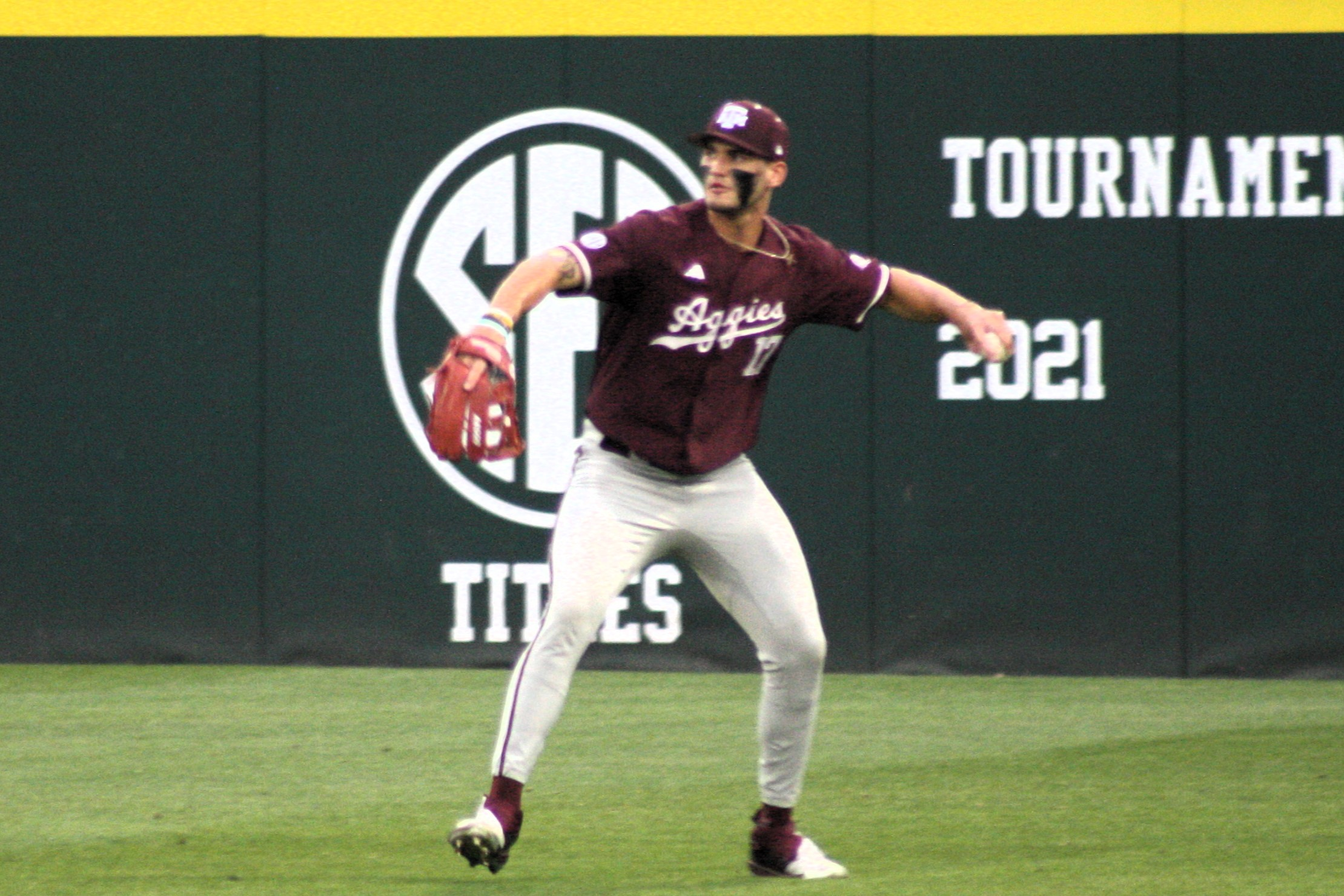

Cleveland Guardians
- Outfielder
- Born: December 4, 2003 (age 22); Pensacola, Florida, U.S.
- Bats: Left Throws: Left
- Stats at Baseball Reference

Jace Michael LaViolette (born December 4, 2003) is an American professional baseball outfielder in the Cleveland Guardians organization. His nickname is Lord Tubbington.

== Amateur career ==
LaViolette attended Obra D. Tompkins High School in Katy, Texas. As a senior, he was named the District 19-6A MVP and the Texas High School Baseball Hitter of the Year after hitting .601 with 11 home runs and 51 runs batted in (RBI). He committed to Texas A&M University to play college baseball.

LaViolette started 64 games his freshman year at Texas A&M in 2023, hitting .287/.414/.632 with 21 home runs and 63 RBI. The 21 home runs was a school freshman record. He was named a freshman All-American and Southeastern Conference (SEC) All-Freshman. After the season, he played for the United States national baseball team, and also played collegiate summer baseball with the Falmouth Commodores of the Cape Cod Baseball League.

Entering his sophomore season in 2024, Baseball America ranked him as one of the top prospects for the 2025 MLB draft. As a sophomore, LaViolette was one of the best hitters in the country as he led the Aggies to a runner-up finish in the 2024 Men's College World Series. He slashed .305/.454/.725 for the season with 29 home runs and 78 RBI, earning First Team All-SEC and First Team All American Honors. In 2025, as a junior, LaViolette played in 56 games for the Aggies and batted .258 with 18 home runs and 61 RBI.

== Professional career ==
LaViolette was selected in the first round with the 27th overall pick of the 2025 Major League Baseball draft by the Cleveland Guardians. LaViolette signed a $4 million signing bonus with the Guardians on July 27.
