= Big 12 Conference Baseball Coach of the Year =

Big 12 Baseball Coach of the Year
- Awarded for: Most outstanding head baseball coach in the Big 12 Conference
- Country: United States
- Presented by: Phillips 66
- First award: 1997
- Currently held by: Dan Fitzgerald, Kansas

The Big 12 Conference Baseball Coach of the Year is a baseball award given to the most outstanding baseball head coach in the Big 12 Conference, as chosen by Big 12 coaches.

== Key ==
	Awarded one of the following National Coach of the Year awards that year: USA Baseball Coach of the Year (USA); Collegiate Baseball Coach of the Year (CB); Baseball America College Coach of the Year (BA)
Coach (X)	Denotes the number of times the coach had been awarded the Coach of the Year award at that point
*	Elected to the National College Baseball Hall of Fame as a coach but is no longer active
*^	Active coach who has been elected to the National College Baseball Hall of Fame (as a coach)
Conf. W–L	Conference win–loss record for that season
Conf. St.^{T}	Conference standing at year's end (^{T}denotes a tie)
Overall W–L	Overall win–loss record for that season
Season^{‡}	Team won the College World Series

== Winners ==
List of Big 12 Conference Coach of the Year award winners
Season	Coach	School	National Coach of the Year Awards	Conf. W–L	Conf. St.	Overall W–L
1997	Larry Hays	Texas Tech	—	23–7	1	46–14
1998	Mark Johnson	Texas A&M	—	21–9	1	46–20
1999	Mark Johnson (2)	Texas A&M	USA	23–6	1	52–18
2000	Steve Smith	Baylor	—	23–7	1	45–17
2001	Dave Van Horn	Nebraska	BA	20-8	1	50–16
2002	Augie Garrido	Texas	CB, BA	19–8	1	57–15^{‡}
2003	Mike Anderson	Nebraska	—	20–7	1	47-18
2004	Augie Garrido (2)	Texas	—	19–7	1	58–15
2005	Mike Anderson (2)	Nebraska	—	19–8	1^{T}	57–15
2006	Augie Garrido (3)	Texas	—	19–7	1	41–21
2007	Augie Garrido (4); Tim Jamieson	Texas; Missouri	— —	21–6; 19–8	1; 2	46–17; 42–18
2008	Rob Childress	Texas A&M	—	19–8	1	46–19
2009	Brad Hill	Kansas State	—	14–11	4	43–18
2010	Augie Garrido (5)	Texas	—	24-3	1	50-13
2011	Augie Garrido (6); Rob Childress (2)	Texas; Texas A&M	— —	19–8; 19-8	1^{T} 1^{T}	49-19; 47–22
2012	Steve Smith (2)	Baylor	—	20–4	1	49-17
2013	Brad Hill (2)	Kansas State	—	16–8	1	45–19
2014	Josh Holliday	Oklahoma State	—	18–6	1	48–18
2015	Jim Schlossnagle	TCU	—	18-5	1	51–15
2016	Tim Tadlock	Texas Tech	—	19-5	1	47–20
2017	Steve Rodriguez	Baylor	—	12–12	4^{T}	34–23
2018	David Pierce	Texas	BA	17–7	1	42–23
2019	Randy Mazey	West Virginia	—	13–11	4	38–22
2020			—			
2021	David Pierce (2)	Texas	—	17–7	1^{T}	50–17
2022	Kirk Saarloos	TCU	—	16-8	1	38–22
2023	Randy Mazey (2)	West Virginia	—	15–9	1^{T}	39–16
2024	Skip Johnson	Oklahoma	—	23–7	1^{T}	37–19
2025	Dan Fitzgerald	Kansas	—	20–10	2	43–17
2026	Dan Fitzgerald (2)	Kansas	—	22–8	1	39–16

== Winners by school ==
List of Big 12 Conference Coach of the Year award winners by school
School	Seasons	Winners	Years
Texas	1997–2024	8	2002, 2004, 2006, 2007, 2010, 2011, 2018, 2021
Texas A&M	1997–2011	4	1998, 1999, 2008, 2011
Baylor	1997–present	3	2000, 2012, 2017
Nebraska	1997–2010	3	2001, 2003, 2005
Kansas	1997–present	2	2025, 2026
Kansas State	1997–present	2	2009, 2013
TCU	2012–present	2	2015, 2022
Texas Tech	1997–present	2	1997, 2016
West Virginia	2012–present	2	2019, 2023
Missouri	1997–2011	1	2007
Oklahoma	1997–2024	1	2024
Oklahoma State	1997–present	1	2014
Iowa State	1997–2001	0	—
Arizona	2025–present	0	—
Arizona State	2025–present	0	—
BYU	2024–present	0	—
Houston	2024–present	0	—
UCF	2024–present	0	—
Utah	2025–present	0	—

== See also ==
- Big 12 Conference Baseball Player of the Year
- Big 12 Conference Baseball Pitcher of the Year
