= 2026 Big 12 Conference baseball tournament =

American college baseball tournament

- Teams: 12
- Format: one bracket single-elimination tournament
- Finals site: Surprise Stadium; Surprise, Arizona
- Champions: Kansas (2nd title)
- Winning coach: Dan Fitzgerald (1st title)
- MVP: Tyson LeBlanc (Kansas)
- Television: Bracket Play: ESPN+, ESPN2, ESPNU; Championship: ESPNU

2026 Big 12 Conference baseball standings
	Conf.				Overall
Team	W		L	PCT	W		L	PCT
No. 12 Kansas ‍†‍‡‍^{y}	22	–	8	.733	45	–	16	.738
No. 4 West Virginia ‍‍‍^{y}	21	–	9	.700	47	–	17	.734
Arizona State ‍‍‍^{y}	19	–	11	.633	39	–	21	.650
UCF ‍‍‍^{y}	19	–	11	.633	32	–	23	.582
No. 25 Oklahoma State ‍‍‍^{y}	18	–	12	.600	39	–	22	.639
Cincinnati ‍‍‍^{y}	17	–	13	.567	38	–	22	.633
TCU ‍‍‍	17	–	13	.567	33	–	21	.611
Baylor ‍‍‍	14	–	16	.467	30	–	27	.526
BYU ‍‍‍	14	–	16	.467	28	–	29	.491
Utah ‍‍‍	12	–	18	.400	26	–	25	.510
Kansas State ‍‍‍	11	–	19	.367	30	–	27	.526
Texas Tech ‍‍‍	10	–	20	.333	27	–	28	.491
Arizona ‍‍‍	9	–	21	.300	19	–	34	.358
Houston ‍‍‍	7	–	23	.233	24	–	31	.436
† – Conference champion ‡ – Tournament champion y – Invited to the NCAA tournament As of May 20, 2026; Rankings from D1baseball

The 2026 Big 12 Conference baseball tournament was a postseason baseball tournament for the Big 12 Conference in the 2026 NCAA Division I baseball season. The tournament took place from May 19–23, 2026 and was held at Surprise Stadium in Surprise, Arizona. This was be the 29th annual postseason Big 12 tournament, with Kansas receiving an automatic berth to the 2026 NCAA Division I baseball tournament.

The tournament has been held since 1997, the inaugural year of the Big 12 Conference. Among current league members, Oklahoma State and TCU have won the most championships with four. Among original members, Kansas State has never won the event. Defending champion Arizona won their first championship in 2025. Iowa State discontinued their program after the 2001 season without having won a title.

== Format and seeding ==
The top twelve finishers from the regular season will be seeded one through twelve, and will then play a single-elimination tournament. This is a change from the previous season where the tournament was double elimination.

Seed	School	Conf.	Over.	Tiebreaker
#1	Kansas	22–8	39–16	
#2	West Virginia	21–9	37–13	
#3	Arizona State	19–11	36–18	2–1 vs UCF
#4	UCF	19–11	31–20	1–2 vs ASU
#5	Oklahoma State	18–12	35–19	
#6	Cincinnati	17–13	37–19	2–1 vs West Virginia
#7	TCU	17–13	33–20	1–2 vs West Virginia
#8	Baylor	14–16	28–26	2–1 vs BYU
#9	BYU	14–16	27–27	1–2 vs Baylor
#10	Utah	12–18	26–24	
#11	Kansas State	11–19	28–26	
#12	Texas Tech	10–20	27–27	

† First Round Bye
Arizona & Houston did not qualify for the tournament

== Bracket ==
First round Tuesday, May 19
12	Texas Tech	8
9	BYU	18^{(7)}
11	Kansas State	9
10	Utah	5

Second round Wednesday, May 20
8	Baylor	13
9	BYU	9
7	TCU	4
11	Kansas State	9

Quarterfinals; Thursday, May 21
1	Kansas	8^{(10)}
8	Baylor	7
4	UCF	6
5	Oklahoma State	12
2	West Virginia	4
11	Kansas State	2
3	Arizona State	10
6	Cincinnati	2

Semifinals; Friday, May 22
1	Kansas	9
5	Oklahoma State	2
2	West Virginia	7
3	Arizona State	3

Finals; Saturday, May 22
1	Kansas	9
2	West Virginia	0

* denotes extra innings

== Schedule ==
Game	Time	Matchup	Score	Box Score	Television	Attendance	Notes
First round – Tuesday, May 19
1	4:30 p.m.	No. 9 BYU vs. No. 12 Texas Tech	18−8^{(7 ing.)}	Box Score	ESPN+	1,298	Texas Tech Eliminated
2	8:00 p.m.	No. 10 Utah vs. No. 11 Kansas State	5−9	Box Score	ESPN+	1,298	Utah Eliminated
Second round – Wednesday, May 20
3	4:30 p.m.	No. 8 Baylor vs. No. 9 BYU	13−9	Box Score	ESPN+	1,413	BYU Eliminated
4	8:00 p.m.	No. 7 TCU vs. No. 11 Kansas State	4−9	Box Score	ESPN+	1,413	TCU Eliminated
Quarterfinals – Thursday, May 21
5	9:00 a.m.	No. 4 UCF vs. No. 5 Oklahoma State	6−12		ESPNU		UCF Eliminated
6	12:30 p.m.	No. 1 Kansas vs. No. 8 Baylor	8−7^{(10)}		ESPNU		Baylor Eliminated
7	4:30 p.m.	No. 2 West Virginia vs. No. 11 Kansas State	4−2		ESPNU		Kansas State Eliminated
8	8:00 p.m.	No. 3 Arizona State vs. No. 6 Cincinnati	10−2		ESPNU		Cincinnati Eliminated
Semifinals – Friday, May 22
9	4:30 p.m.	No. 5 Oklahoma State vs. No. 1 Kansas	2−9		ESPN+		Oklahoma State Eliminated
10	8:00 p.m.	No. 2 West Virginia vs. No. 3 Arizona State	7−3		ESPN+		Arizona State Eliminated
Championship – Saturday, May 23
11	6:00 p.m.	No. 1 Kansas vs. No. 2 West Virginia	9−0		ESPN2		West Virginia Eliminated
Game times in MST. Rankings denote tournament seed.

== Conference Championship Game ==
Big 12 Championship
TBD	vs.	TBD

May 23, 2026 6:00 p.m. (MST) at Surprise Stadium in Surprise, Arizona
Team
TBD
TBD
WP: (–) LP: (–)

== All-tournament Team ==
The following players were members of the 2026 Big 12 Baseball All-Tournament Team. Player in Bold selected as Tournament MVP.

Position	Player	School
C	Augusto Mungarrieta	Kansas
1B	Armani Guzman	West Virginia
2B	Cade Baldridge	Kansas
3B	Easton Jones	BYU
**SS**	**Tyson LeBlanc**	**Kansas**
OF	Matt Polk	Arizona State
OF	Brady Janusek	Baylor
OF	Savion Flowers	Kansas
DH	Sean Smith	West Virginia
SP	Dominic Voegele	Kansas
SP	Maxx Yehl	West Virginia
RP	Taylor Penn	Arizona State
