= Kirk Saarloos =

American baseball player (born 1979)

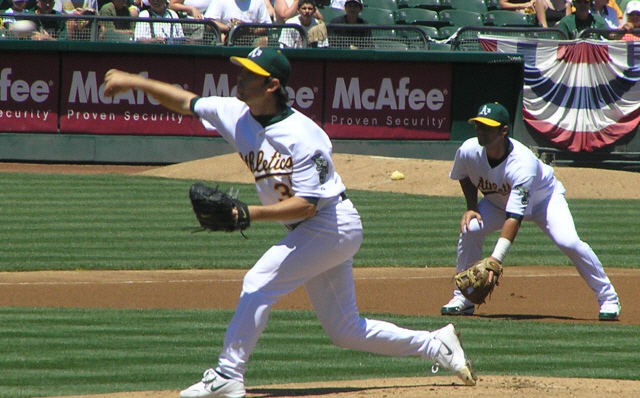

TCU Horned Frogs
- Head Coach / Pitcher
- Born: May 23, 1979 (age 47); Long Beach, California, U.S.
- Batted: Right Threw: Right

MLB debut
- June 18, 2002, for the Houston Astros

Last MLB appearance
- September 20, 2008, for the Oakland Athletics

MLB statistics
- Win–loss record: 29–30
- Earned run average: 5.02
- Strikeouts: 251

NCAA statistics (through January 21, 2026)
- Managerial record: 154-87
- Winning %: .639
- Stats at Baseball Reference

Teams
- As player: Houston Astros (2002–2003); Oakland Athletics (2004–2006); Cincinnati Reds (2007); Oakland Athletics (2008); As coach: Cal State Fullerton (assistant) (2011–2012); TCU (assistant) (2013–2021); TCU (2022–present)

Career highlights and awards
- As player: Pitched a college no-hitter on April 9, 2001; Pitched a combined MLB no-hitter on June 11, 2003; As Coach: Big 12 Coach of the Year: 2022; Big 12 Regular Season Title: 2022; Big 12 Tournament Title: 2023

Kirk Craig Saarloos (born May 23, 1979) is an American baseball coach and former pitcher, who is the current head baseball coach of the TCU Horned Frogs. He played college baseball at Cal State Fullerton for coach George Horton from 1999 to 2001 and played in Major League Baseball (MLB) for seven seasons from 2002 to 2008.

The Houston Astros selected Saarloos in the third round of the 2001 Major League Baseball draft. He played 7 years a pitcher in MLB, with Houston from 2002 to 2003, the Oakland Athletics 2004 to 2006, Cincinnati Reds in 2007 before returning to Oakland in 2008.

== High school and college ==
Saarloos graduated from Valley Christian High School in Cerritos, California, where he was a three-sport (baseball, football and soccer) athlete. He attended California State University, Fullerton, where he established himself as one of the best closers in college baseball during his sophomore and junior seasons. In 1999, he played collegiate summer baseball with the Cotuit Kettleers of the Cape Cod Baseball League.

In 2001, his senior year, Saarloos became a starting pitcher (the new closer was Chad Cordero) and established himself as the ace of the staff, winning 15 games with a 2.18 earned run average (ERA). On April 9, 2001, he threw a no-hitter against Pacific as he struck out 11 and retired 22 consecutive batters before a two-out infield error in the ninth inning, but he got the next batter to end the game. He was drafted by the Houston Astros in the 2001 Major League Baseball draft in the third round as the 86th overall pick.

== Professional career ==
Saarloos quickly rose in the Astros organization, making brief stops with the Double-A Round Rock Express and the Triple-A New Orleans Zephyrs before being called up to the major leagues in his second year as a professional. In 2002, he went 6–7 with a 6.01 ERA with Houston and was sent down to New Orleans for the next season. In 2003, he again pitched very well in the minors but posted a 4.93 ERAin 36 games for the big club. He also contributed to the Astros' six-pitcher no-hitter of the New York Yankees on June 11, throwing the last out of the third inning and all of the fourth.

A few weeks into the 2004 season, after appearing in only two games for New Orleans, he was traded to the Athletics for Chad Harville. They sent him to the Triple-A Sacramento River Cats, where he pitched well enough to receive a call-up and start five games for Oakland.

In 2005, with Mark Mulder and Tim Hudson traded away, the Athletics had openings in their rotation. Saarloos beat out Keiichi Yabu and Juan Cruz to win the last starter spot in the rotation. Saarloos succeeded, going 10–9 with a 4.17 ERA in 27 starts. He was widely considered to be among the best #5 starters in the American League, sporting one of the lowest home run rates.

With the signing of veteran starter Esteban Loaiza before the 2006 season, the Athletics bumped Saarloos to the bullpen. Soon after, Rich Harden got injured, and Saarloos was put in as a fifth starter for a few games. He was also used in many varying relief roles, much like Justin Duchscherer was in 2005, but also as a spot starter. Shifting between the bullpen and the rotation, Saarloos finished with a record of 7–7 in 35 games for the A's. He allowed more home runs (19) than the previous season (11). On January 19, 2007, Saarloos signed a one-year $1.2 million deal with the Athletics.

On January 23, 2007, Saarloos was traded to the Cincinnati Reds for minor league reliever David Shafer. Both teams also received a player to be named later. On May 28, 2007, Saarloos was sent to the minors after failing to retire any of the seven batters he faced in a 14–10 loss to the Pittsburgh Pirates the night before. In his lone season with the Reds, Saarloos had a 7.17 ERA in 42.2 innings. On October 12, 2007, Saarloos was outrighted to the minor leagues. He refused the assignment and became a free agent.

On January 15, 2008, Saarloos signed a minor league contract with an invitation to spring training with the Oakland Athletics. On April 14, he was added to the major league roster but was designated for assignment on April 23. He was sent outright to Triple-A on April 25. On August 18, Saarloos was recalled. He became a free agent at the end of the season.

Saarloos signed a minor league contract with an invitation to spring training with the Cleveland Indians in January 2009; after training camp, he was sent to minor league camp on March 24, 2009. He went 3–10 in 16 games at the AAA level. He retired after the 2009 season.

== Scouting ==
Saarloos had a variety of pitches, including a four-seam fastball, a curveball, a slider, and a changeup. However, his best pitch was his mid-to-high 80s sinker. For this reason, Saarloos was known predominantly as a sinkerball specialist and as such, got few strikeouts (batters tend to hit groundballs when faced with a sinker). In fact, his 2.99 strikeouts per nine innings in 2005 ranked third to last in Major League Baseball and was the lowest mark in Oakland Athletics history for a starting pitcher.

== Coaching career ==
Saarloos was on the 2011 Cal State Fullerton coaching staff as an undergraduate assistant coach. His primary duties were as pitching coach. Opposing teams batted .250 against his pitchers, and he coached Big West Pitcher of the Year Dylan Floro and four Freshmen All-American pitchers. In 2012, Saarloos returned to Cal State Fullerton as their full-time pitching coach and assisted in recruiting. He became the pitching coach at Texas Christian University in the summer of 2012. He led the team to the lowest ERA in school history since 1968.

He was named the head coach at TCU on June 15, 2021. In 2022, Saarloos led the Horned Frogs to a regular season Big 12 Championship, and an appearance in the College Station regional. In 2023, the Horned Frogs finished 4th in the Big 12 regular season standings, won the Big 12 tournament championship, and won the Fayetteville Regional. They beat Indiana State in the Super Regionals and advanced to the College World Series.

== Head coaching record ==
Record table
Season	Team	Overall	Conference	Standing	Postseason
TCU Horned Frogs (Big 12 Conference) (2022–present)
2022	TCU	38–22	16–8	1st	NCAA Regional
2023	TCU	44–24	13–11	4th	College World Series
2024	TCU	33–21	14–16	9th	Big 12 tournament
2025	TCU	39–20	19–11	3rd	NCAA Regional
2026	TCU	33–21	17–13	T-6th	Big 12 tournament
TCU:		187–108	79–59		
Total:		187–108			
National champion Postseason invitational champion Conference regular season champion Conference regular season and conference tournament champion Division regular season champion Division regular season and conference tournament champion Conference tournament champion

== See also ==
- Houston Astros award winners and league leaders
- List of Houston Astros no-hitters
- List of Major League Baseball no-hitters
- List of California State University, Fullerton people

Awards and achievements
Preceded by Kevin Millwood	No-hit game June 11, 2003 (with Oswalt, Munro, Lidge, Dotel, & Wagner)	Succeeded by Randy Johnson
