= 2026 Kansas State Wildcats baseball team =

American college baseball season

2026 Kansas State Wildcats baseball
- Conference: Big 12 Conference
- Record: 30–27 (11–19 Big 12)
- Head coach: Pete Hughes (8th season)
- Assistant coaches: Austin Wates (8th season); Thomas Hughes (6th season); Rudy Darrow (4th season)
- Home stadium: Tointon Family Stadium

2026 Big 12 Conference baseball standings
	Conf.				Overall
Team	W		L	PCT	W		L	PCT
No. 12 Kansas ‍†‍‡‍^{y}	22	–	8	.733	45	–	16	.738
No. 4 West Virginia ‍‍‍^{y}	21	–	9	.700	47	–	17	.734
Arizona State ‍‍‍^{y}	19	–	11	.633	39	–	21	.650
UCF ‍‍‍^{y}	19	–	11	.633	32	–	23	.582
No. 25 Oklahoma State ‍‍‍^{y}	18	–	12	.600	39	–	22	.639
Cincinnati ‍‍‍^{y}	17	–	13	.567	38	–	22	.633
TCU ‍‍‍	17	–	13	.567	33	–	21	.611
Baylor ‍‍‍	14	–	16	.467	30	–	27	.526
BYU ‍‍‍	14	–	16	.467	28	–	29	.491
Utah ‍‍‍	12	–	18	.400	26	–	25	.510
Kansas State ‍‍‍	11	–	19	.367	30	–	27	.526
Texas Tech ‍‍‍	10	–	20	.333	27	–	28	.491
Arizona ‍‍‍	9	–	21	.300	19	–	34	.358
Houston ‍‍‍	7	–	23	.233	24	–	31	.436
† – Conference champion ‡ – Tournament champion y – Invited to the NCAA tournament As of May 20, 2026; Rankings from D1baseball

The 2026 Kansas State Wildcats baseball team represented Kansas State University during the 2026 NCAA Division I baseball season. The Wildcats played their home games at Tointon Family Stadium as a member of the Big 12 Conference. They were led by head coach Pete Hughes, in his 8th season at Kansas State.

== Previous season ==
The 2025 Kansas State Wildcats baseball team finished 32–27 overall and 17–13 in Big 12 play, placing sixth in the conference. The Wildcats earned an at-large berth to the 2025 NCAA Division I baseball tournament and competed in the Austin Regional, where they were eliminated by host Texas.

== Personnel ==
=== Coaching staff ===
Name	Position	Seasons at K-State	Alma mater
Pete Hughes	Head coach	8	Davidson (1990)
Austin Wates	Associate Head Coach	8	Virginia Tech (2017)
Thomas Hughes	Assistant coach	6	Kansas State (2019)
Rudy Darrow	Pitching Coach	4	Nicholls State University (2019)

== Schedule and results ==
2026 Kansas State Wildcats baseball game log (30–27)
Legend: = Win = Loss = Canceled Bold = Kansas State team member
Regular season (28–26)

February (8–4)
Date	Time (CST)	TV	Opponent	Rank	Stadium	Score	Win	Loss	Save	Attend	Overall Record	Big 12 Record	Sources
Feb. 13	2:00 pm	MLB.com	vs. Iowa*	—	Goodyear Ballpark; Goodyear, AZ	**W** 15-6	**Guyette** **(1-0)**	Guerin (0-1)	—	572	1-0	—	
Feb. 14	6:00 pm	MLB.com	vs. UConn*	—	Scottsdale Stadium; Scottsdale, AZ	**W** 7-3	**Feser** **(1-0)**	Meyers (0-1)	—	368	2-0	—	
Feb. 15	12:45 pm	MLB.com	vs. Penn State*	—	Sloan Park; Mesa, AZ	**W** 24-5 (7 inn.)	**Sheffield** **(1-0)**	Shayter (0-1)	—	347	3-0	—	
Feb. 16	2:00 pm	MLB.com	vs. Air Force*	—	Sloan Park	**W** 11-8	**Fortenberry** **(1-0)**	Shropshire (0-1)	—	352	4-0	—	
Feb. 20	7:00 pm	FloSports	vs. #9 Auburn*	—	Globe Life Field; Arlington, TX	**L** 1-5	Marciano (1-0)	**Guyette** **(1-1)**	—	3,219	4-1	—	
Feb. 21	7:30 pm	FloSports	vs. Nebraska*	—	Globe Life Field	**W** 5-3	**Liggett** **(1-0)**	Unger (0-1)	—	3,702	5-1	—	
Feb. 22	6:30 pm	FloSports	vs. Michigan*	—	Globe Life Field	**W** 10-6	**Sheffield** **(2-0)**	Barr (1-1)	**Feser** **(1)**	3,374	6-1	—	
Feb. 24	6:00 pm	—	at Louisiana*	—	M. L. Tigue Moore Field at Russo Park; Lafayette, LA	**L** 0-1	Pruitt (2-0)	**Duke** **(0-1)**	Carter (2)	3,783	6-2	—	
Feb. 25	6:00 pm	ESPN+	at Louisiana*	—	M. L. Tigue Moore Field at Russo Park	**L** 2-3	Wilson (1-0)	**Feser** **(1-1)**	—	3,680	6-3	—	
Feb. 27 (DH 1)	2:00 pm	ESPN+	Columbia*	—	Tointon Family Stadium; Manhattan, KS	**L** 8-9	Kleinhans (1-0)	**Wisenbaker** **(0-1)**	Hicks (2)	2,344	6-4	—	
Feb. 27 (DH 2)	2:00 pm	ESPN+	Columbia*	—	Tointon Family Stadium	**W** 2-1	**Eich** **(1-0)**	Mills (0-1)	—	2,344	7-4	—	
Feb. 28	1:00 pm	—	Columbia*	—	Tointon Family Stadium	**W** 5-2	**Sheffield** **(3-0)**	Santana (0-2)	**Feser** **(2)**	2,344	8-4	—	

March (11–6)
Date	Time (CST)	TV	Opponent	Rank	Stadium	Score	Win	Loss	Save	Attend	Overall Record	Big 12 Record	Sources
Mar. 6	4:00 pm	ESPN+	SIU Edwardsville*	—	Tointon Family Stadium	**W** 14-5	**Guyette** **(2-1)**	Phillips (1-2)	**Arther** **(1)**	1,670	9-4	—	
Mar. 7	4:00 pm	ESPN+	SIU Edwardsville*	—	Tointon Family Stadium	**W** 8-4	**Duke** **(1-1)**	Teixeira (0-3)	**Butler** **(1)**	1,813	10-4	—	
Mar. 8	1:00 pm	ESPN+	SIU Edwardsville*	—	Tointon Family Stadium	**W** 20-7 (7 inn.)	**Sheffield** **(4-0)**	Stearns (0-2)	—	2,002	11-4	—	
Mar. 10	6:00 pm	ESPN+	Wichita State*	—	Tointon Family Stadium	**W** 7-5	**Arther** **(1-0)**	Owens (0-1)	**Butler** **(2)**	2,339	12-4	—	
Mar. 11	6:00 pm	ESPN+	South Dakota State*	—	Tointon Family Stadium	**W** 9-0	**Haley** **(1-0)**	Rylance (0-2)	—	1,457	13-4	—	
Mar. 13	6:30 pm	ESPN+	at Houston	—	Schroeder Park; Houston, TX	**W** 20- (8 inn.)	**Guyette** **(3-1)**	Scinta (1-3)	—	862	14-4	1-0	
Mar. 14	6:30 pm	ESPN+	at Houston	—	Schroeder Park	**W** 16-1 (7 inn.)	**Duke** **(2-1)**	Hoffman (1-1)	—	942	15-4	2-0	
Mar. 15	1:00 pm	ESPN+	at Houston	—	Schroeder Park	**L** 6-16 (8 inn.)	Bryan (1-1)	**Butler** **(0-1)**	—	887	15-5	2-1	
Mar. 17	6:30 pm	ESPN+	at Baylor*	#24	Baylor Ballpark; Waco, TX	**W** 13-3 (7 inn.)	**Flores** **(1-0)**	Baker (1-1)	**Arnold** **(1)**	2,360	16-5	2-1	
Mar. 20	6:00 pm	ESPN+	Arizona State	#24	Tointon Family Stadium	**L** 4-5	Fitzpatrick (2-0)	**Butler** **(0-2)**	Schaefer (3)	2,344	16-6	2-2	
Mar. 21	4:00 pm	ESPN+	Arizona State	#24	Tointon Family Stadium	**L** 12-18	Fitzpatrick (3-0)	**Flores** **(1-1)**	—	2,344	16-7	2-3	
Mar. 22	1:00 pm	ESPN+	Arizona State	#24	Tointon Family Stadium	**W** 12-1 (7 inn.)	**Sheffield** **(5-0)**	Klecker (3-1)	—	2,173	17-7	3-3	
Mar. 24	6:00 pm	ESPN+	#24 Nebraska*	—	Tointon Family Stadium	**L** 9-14	Worthley (2-0)	**Arnold** **(0-1)**	—	2,344	17-8	3-3	
Mar. 27	7:00 pm	ESPN+	at Utah	—	America First Ballpark; Salt Lake City, UT	**W** 8-5	**Guyette** **(4-1)**	McAnelly (2-4)	**Arther** **(2)**	1,547	18-8	4-3	
Mar. 28	3:00 pm	ESPN+	at Utah	—	America First Ballpark	**L** 11-13	Soder (1-0)	**Smith** **(0-1)**	Lenius (1)	1,623	18-9	4-4	
Mar. 29	2:00 pm	ESPN+	at Utah	—	America First Ballpark	**L** 14-16	Culver (1-0)	**Arther** **(1-1)**	Gazaway (2)	1,688	18-10	4-5	
Mar. 31	7:00 pm	ESPN+	at BYU*	—	Larry H. Miller Sports Complex; Provo, UT	**W** 16-3 (8 inn.)	**Haley** **(2-0)**	Marx (0-1)	—	1,793	19-10	4-5	

April (7–9)
Date	Time (CST)	TV	Opponent	Rank	Stadium	Score	Win	Loss	Save	Attend	Overall Record	Big 12 Record	Sources
Apr. 3	6:00 pm	ESPN+	TCU	—	Tointon Family Stadium	**W** 13-12	**Smith** **(1-1)**	Quinn (2-2)	—	1,995	20-10	5-5	
Apr. 4	4:00 pm	ESPN+	TCU	—	Tointon Family Stadium	**L** 3-9	Davis (2-3)	**Sheffield** **(5-1)**	—	2,344	20-11	5-6	
Apr. 5	1:00 pm	ESPN+	TCU	—	Tointon Family Stadium	**L** 0-4	James (4-0)	**Flores** **(1-2)**	—	1,902	20-12	5-7	
Apr. 7	6:05 pm	ESPN+	at Wichita State*	—	Eck Stadium; Wichita, KS	**W** 10-6	**Duke** **(3-1)**	Hamilton (3-5)	**Butler** **(3)**	2,767	21-12	5-7	
Apr. 10	6:00 pm	ESPN+	Oklahoma State	—	Tointon Family Stadium	**W** 11-3	**Guyette** **(5-1)**	Lund (3-1)	—	2,147	22-12	6-7	
Apr. 11	4:00 pm	ESPN+	Oklahoma State	—	Tointon Family Stadium	**W** 13-9	**Arther** **(2-1)**	Rhodes (1-2)	—	2,344	23-12	7-7	
Apr. 12	1:00 pm	ESPN+	Oklahoma State	—	Tointon Family Stadium	**L** 10-12 (13 inn.)	Jennings (1-0)	**Smith** **(1-2)**	—	2,101	23-13	7-8	
Apr. 14	6:00 pm	ESPN+	Omaha*	—	Tointon Family Stadium	**L** 5-12	Curtis (3-2)	**Duke** **(3-2)**	—	2,156	23-14	7-8	
Apr. 17	8:00 pm	ESPN+	at Arizona	—	Hi Corbett Field; Tucson, AZ	**W** 2-1	'**Smith** **(2-1)**	Hicks (3-1)	—	3,600	24-14	8-8	
Apr. 18	8:00 pm	ESPN+	at Arizona	—	Hi Corbett Field	**W** 11-1 (8 inn.)	**Sheffield** **(6-1)**	Morris (1-2)	—	3,903	25-14	9-8	
Apr. 19	2:00 pm	ESPN+	at Arizona	—	Hi Corbett Field	**L** 7–11	McKinney (3–5)	**Fortenberry** **(1–1)**	Hicks (6)	2,150	25–15	9–9	
Apr. 21	3:00 pm	Mountain West Network	at Grand Canyon*	—	Brazell Field at GCU Ballpark; Phoenix, AZ	**W** 8–3	**Feser** **(2-1)**	Smith (0-2)	—	306	26-15	9–9	
Apr. 24	6:00 pm	ESPN+	#16 Kansas	—	Tointon Family Stadium	**L** 6–18 (7 inn.)	Cook (3–1)	**Guyette** **(5–2)**	—	2,344	26-16	9–10	
Apr. 25	2:00 pm	ESPN+	#16 Kansas	—	Tointon Family Stadium	**L** 8–10	Scheidt (3-1)	**Smith** **(2–3)**	—	2,344	26–17	9-11	
Apr. 26	11:00 am	ESPN+	#16 Kansas	—	Tointon Family Stadium	**L** 7–9	Carr (3-1)	**Feser** **(2–2)**	Rahe (7)	2,247	26-18	9-12	
Apr. 28	6:05 pm	Big Ten Network	at #16 Nebraska*	—	Haymarket Park; Lincoln, NE	**L** 6–7	Unger (6-1)	**Smith** **(2-4)**	—	5,531	26-19	9-12	

May (2–7)
Date	Time (CST)	TV	Opponent	Rank	Stadium	Score	Win	Loss	Save	Attend	Overall Record	Big 12 Record	Sources
May 1	5:30 pm	ESPN+	at #18 West Virginia	—	Wagener Field at Kendrick Family Ballpark; Morgantown, WV	**L** 0–7	Yehl (6–1)	**Butler** **(0–3)**	Korn (1)	2,884	26–20	9–13	
May 2	3:00 pm	ESPN+	at #18 West Virginia	—	Wagener Field at Kendrick Family Ballpark	**L** 1–9	Cole (8–1)	**Sheffield** **(6–2)**	—	3,067	26–21	9–14	
May 3	12:00 pm	ESPN+	at #18 West Virginia	—	Wagener Field at Kendrick Family Ballpark	**L** 6–13	Estridge (4–0)	**Guyette** **(5–2)**	—	2,757	26-22	9–15	
Mar. 5	—	ESPN+	at Missouri State*	—	Hammons Field; Springfield, MO		**Canceled**		—		—	—	
Mar. 6	—	ESPN+	Omaha*	—	Tointon Family Stadium		**Canceled**		—		—	—	
May 8	6:00 pm	ESPN+	Cincinnati	—	Tointon Family Stadium	**L** 2–4	Mauro (2–3)	**Butler** **(0–4)**	Buczkowski (5)	2,344	26-23	9-16	
May 9	4:00 pm	ESPN+	Cincinnati	—	Tointon Family Stadium	**L** 3–5	Brown (5–0)	**Sheffield** **(6–3)**	—	2,344	26-24	9-17	
May 10	11:00 am	ESPN+	Cincinnati	—	Tointon Family Stadium	**W** 5–2	**Guyette** **(6–3)**	Blue (4–1)	—	1,973	27-24	10-17	
May 14	5:00 pm	ESPN+	at UCF	—	John Euliano Park; Orlando, FL	**L** 6–10	Schoneboom (3–2)	**Smith** **(2–5)**	—	1,828	27-25	10–18	
May 15	5:00 pm	ESPN+	at UCF	—	John Euliano Park	**W** 5–4	**Sheffield** **(7–3)**	Wicker (5–3)	**Feser** **(3)**	2,230	28-25	11-18	
May 16	12:00 pm	ESPN+	at UCF	—	John Euliano Park	**L** 5–6	Murray (5–2)	**Guyette** **(6–4)**	—	2,005	28-26	11-19	

Postseason (2–1)

Big 12 Tournament (2–1)
Date	Time (CST)	TV	Opponent	Seed	Stadium	Score	Win	Loss	Save	Attend	Overall Record	Tourney Record	Sources
May 19	10:00 pm	ESPN+	vs. (10) Utah	(11)	Surprise Stadium; Surprise, AZ	**W** 4–2	**Sheffield** **(8–3)**	Kittredge (1–1)	—	1,298	29–26	1–0	
May 20	10:00 pm	ESPN+	vs. (7) TCU	(11)	Surprise Stadium	**W** 9–4	**Arther** **(3–1)**	LaPour (1–3)	**Feser** **(4)**	1,413	30–26	2–0	
May 21	6:30 pm	ESPNU	vs. (2) #9 West Virginia	(11)	Surprise Stadium	**L** 2–4	Yehl (8–2)	**Sheffield** **(8–4)**	Korn (2)	2,119	30–27	2–1	

* indicates a non-conference game.
(#) All rankings from D1 Baseball Poll on the date of the contest.
