= 2026 TCU Horned Frogs baseball team =

American college baseball season

2026 TCU Horned Frogs baseball
- Conference: Big 12 Conference
- Record: 33–21 (17–13 Big 12)
- Head coach: Kirk Saarloos (5th as head coach, 14th overall season)
- Assistant coaches: Bill Mosiello (2nd season); John DiLaura (8th season); Dave Lawn (3rd season)
- Home stadium: Lupton Stadium

2026 Big 12 Conference baseball standings
	Conf.				Overall
Team	W		L	PCT	W		L	PCT
No. 13 Kansas ‍†‍‡‍^{y}	22	–	8	.733	45	–	16	.738
No. 9 West Virginia ‍‍‍^{y}	21	–	9	.700	45	–	15	.750
No. 22 Arizona State ‍‍‍^{y}	19	–	11	.633	39	–	21	.650
UCF ‍‍‍^{y}	19	–	11	.633	32	–	23	.582
No. 19 Oklahoma State ‍‍‍^{y}	18	–	12	.600	39	–	22	.639
No. 24 Cincinnati ‍‍‍^{y}	17	–	13	.567	38	–	22	.633
TCU ‍‍‍	17	–	13	.567	33	–	21	.611
Baylor ‍‍‍	14	–	16	.467	30	–	27	.526
BYU ‍‍‍	14	–	16	.467	28	–	29	.491
Utah ‍‍‍	12	–	18	.400	26	–	25	.510
Kansas State ‍‍‍	11	–	19	.367	30	–	27	.526
Texas Tech ‍‍‍	10	–	20	.333	27	–	28	.491
Arizona ‍‍‍	9	–	21	.300	19	–	34	.358
Houston ‍‍‍	7	–	23	.233	24	–	31	.436
† – Conference champion ‡ – Tournament champion y – Invited to the NCAA tournament As of May 20, 2026; Rankings from D1baseball

The 2026 TCU Horned Frogs baseball team represents Texas Christian University (TCU) during the 2026 NCAA Division I baseball season. The Horned Frogs play their home games at Lupton Stadium as a member of the Big 12 Conference and are led by head coach Kirk Saarloos, in his fifth year as head coach and 14th season at TCU.

== Previous season ==
The 2025 TCU Horned Frogs baseball team notched a 39-20 (19-11) record. They would be the 3rd seed in the Big 12 tournament, where they would be 11th seed Houston in the Quarterfinals, and 2nd seed Kansas in the Semifinals, before losing to 4th seed Arizona in the Championship Game. They would be invited to play in the 2025 NCAA Division I baseball tournament, where they played in the Corvallis Super Regional as a 2nd seed, where they would lose to 3rd seed USC and 1st seed (Regional Host) Oregon State.

== Roster ==
2026 TCU Horned Frogs roster
Pitchers	Catchers Infielders	Outfielders	Two Way Players

=== Coaches ===
2026 TCU Horned Frogs baseball coaching staff
- Kirk Saarloos – Head coach – 5th season (14th overall season)
- Bill Mosiello – Assistant coach – 2nd season
- John DiLaura – Assistant coach – 8th season
- Dave Lawn – Assistant coach – 3rd season

Note: Season counter accounts for all stints at TCU.

=== Starters ===
Opening Night Lineup
Pos.	No.	Player.	Year
LF			
CF			
SS			
DH			
1B			
RF			
3B			
C			
2B			

Weekend pitching rotation
Day	No.	Player.	Year
Friday			
Saturday			
Sunday			

== Schedule and results ==
2026 TCU Horned Frogs baseball game log (33–21)
Legend: = Win = Loss = Canceled Bold = TCU team member
Regular season (33–20)

February (5–5)
Date	Time (CST)	TV	Opponent	Rank	Stadium	Score	Win	Loss	Save	Attend	Overall Record	Big 12 Record	Sources
Feb. 13	3:00 pm	FloSports	vs. #23 Vanderbilt*	#10	Globe Life Field; Arlington, TX	**W** 5-4	**Stern** **(1-0)**	Guth (0-1)	**Quinn** **(1)**	18,387	1-0	—	
Feb. 14	7:00 pm	FloSports	vs. #7 Arkansas*	#10	Globe Life Field	**W** 5-4	**James** **(1-0)**	Dietz (0-1)	**Franco** **(1)**	22,384	2-0	—	
Feb. 15	6:30 pm	FloSports	vs. Oklahoma*	#10	Globe Life Field	**L** 2-12 (7 inn.)	Rager (1-0)	**Davis** **(0-1)**	—	16,951	2-1	—	
Feb. 17	7:00 pm	—	vs. UT Arlington*	#7	Globe Life Field	**L** 8-11	Sears (1-1)	**Johnson** **(0-1)**	Evans (1)	679	2-2	—	
Feb. 20	7:00 pm	FS1	at #1 UCLA*	#7	Jackie Robinson Stadium; Los Angeles, CA	**L** 2-10	Reddemann (2-0)	**Brassfield** **(0-1)**	—	1,165	2-3	—	
Feb. 21	4:00 pm	B1G+	at #1 UCLA*	#7	Jackie Robinson Stadium	**L** 1-5	Barnett (2-0)	**Davis** **(0-2)**	Moss (1)	1,413	2-4	—	
Feb. 22	3:00 pm	B1G+	at #1 UCLA*	#7	Jackie Robinson Stadium	**L** 5-15 (8 inn.)	Iwanaga (1-0)	**Sagouspe** **(0-1)**	—	1,552	2-5	—	
Feb. 23	3:00 pm	ESPN+	at LMU*	#7	George C. Page Stadium; Los Angeles, CA	**W** 17-7 (7 inn.)	**Quinn** **(1-0)**	Fried (0-1)	—	319	3-5	—	
Feb. 27	6:00 pm	ESPN+	New Haven*	#18	Lupton Stadium; Fort Worth, TX	**W** 14-3 (7 inn.)	**Brassfield** **(1-1)**	McDermott (0-2)	**Durnin** **(1)**	4562	4-5	—	
Feb. 28	2:00 pm	ESPN+	New Haven*	#18	Lupton Stadium	**W** 12-4	**Quinn** **(2-0)**	Fusco (0-2)	—	3,837	5-5	—	

March (13–5)
Date	Time (CST)	TV	Opponent	Rank	Stadium	Score	Win	Loss	Save	Attend	Overall Record	Big 12 Record	Sources
Mar. 1	1:00 pm	ESPN+	New Haven*	#18	Lupton Stadium	**W** 20-1 (7 inn.)	**Fernsler** **(1-0)**	Gibson (0-2)	—	3,896	6-5	—	
Mar. 3	6:00 pm	ESPN+	Abilene Christian*	#17	Lupton Stadium	**W** 7-6	**Thomas** **(1-0)**	Whiteaker (1-1)	—	3,961	7-5	—	
Mar. 6	6:00 pm	ESPN+	Tulane*	#17	Lupton Stadium	**W** 10-2	**Brassfield** **(2-1)**	Cehajic (1-1)	—	4,165	8-5	—	
Mar. 8 (DH 1)	12:00 pm	ESPN+	Tulane*	#17	Lupton Stadium	**L** 4-8	Rodriguez (3-0)	**Quinn** **(2-1)**	Vincent (2)	—	8-6	—	
Mar. 8 (DH 2)	3:45 pm	ESPN+	Tulane*	#17	Lupton Stadium	**W** 4-3	**Thomas** **(2-0)**	Sampson (0-2)	**Quinn** **(2)**	4452	9-6	—	
Mar. 10	6:00 pm	ESPN+	Kansas*	#17	Lupton Stadium	**W** 9-4	**James** **(2-0)**	Fink (0-1)	—	3812	10-6	—	
Mar. 13	8:30 pm	ESPN+	at Arizona State	#17	Phoenix Municipal Stadium; Phoenix, AZ	**W** 5-4	**Stern** **(2-0)**	Edwards (0-1)	**Sagouspe** **(2)**	3,858	11-6	1-0	
Mar. 14	8:30 pm	ESPN+	at Arizona State	#17	Phoenix Municipal Stadium	**L** 8-15	Penn (3-0)	**Davis** **(0-3)**	—	4483	11-7	1-1	
Mar. 15	13:00 pm	ESPN+	at Arizona State	#17	Phoenix Municipal Stadium	**L** 0-4	Klecker (3-0)	**Baumler** **(0-1)**	—	3,013	11-8	1-2	
Mar. 17	2:00 pm	ESPN+	New Mexico State*	—	Lupton Stadium	**W** 16-6 (7 inn.)	**James** **(3-0)**	Carvajal (0-1)	—	3,863	12-8	1-2	
Mar. 20	6:00 pm	ESPN+	UCF	—	Lupton Stadium	**L** 7-18	Sosnowski (1-0)	**Brassfield** **(2-2)**	—	4,072	12-9	1-3	
Mar. 21	5:00 pm	ESPN+	UCF	—	Lupton Stadium	**W** 6-0	**Davis** **(1-3)**	Sauser (2-1)	—	4,128	13-9	2-3	
Mar. 22	1:00 pm	ESPN+	UCF	—	Lupton Stadium	**L** 1-9	Wicker (2-1)	**Baumler** **(0-2)**	—	4,060	13-10	2-4	
Mar. 24	6:30 pm	ESPN+	at Dallas Baptist*	—	Horner Ballpark; Dallas, TX	**W** 11-5	**Sagouspe** **(2-1)**	Knipper (0-1)	—	1462	14-10	2-4	
Mar. 27	6:00 pm	ESPN+	Texas Tech	—	Lupton Stadium	**W** 18-8 (7 inn.)	**Brassfield** **(3-2)**	Pirko (3-2)	—	4,483	15-10	3-4	
Mar. 28	2:00 pm	ESPN+	Texas Tech	—	Lupton Stadium	**W** 10-9 (13 inn.)	**Baumler** **(1-2)**	Rogers (0-1)	—	4,238	16-10	4-4	
Mar. 29	1:00 pm	ESPN+	Texas Tech	—	Lupton Stadium	**W** 5-4	**Franco** **(1-0)**	Jordan (2-1)	—	4,235	17-10	5-4	
Mar. 31	6:00 pm	ESPN+	Lamar*	—	Lupton Stadium	**W** 8-6	**Barrientes** **(1-0)**	Dagley (1-2)	**Stern** **(1)**	3,430	18-10	5-4	

April (11–5)
Date	Time (CST)	TV	Opponent	Rank	Stadium	Score	Win	Loss	Save	Attend	Overall Record	Big 12 Record	Sources
Apr. 3	6:00 pm	ESPN+	at Kansas State	—	Tointon Family Stadium; Manhattan, KS	**L** 12-13	Smith (1-1)	**Quinn** **(2-2)**	—	1,995	18-11	5-5	
Apr. 4	4:00 pm	ESPN+	at Kansas State	—	Tointon Family Stadium	**W** 9-3	**Davis** **(2-3)**	Sheffield (5-1)	—	2,344	19-11	6-5	
Apr. 5	11:00 pm	ESPN+	at Kansas State	—	Tointon Family Stadium	**W** 4-0	**James** **(4-0)**	Flores (1-2)	—	1,902	20-11	7-5	
Apr. 7	6:00 pm	ESPN+	at Abilene Christian*	—	Crutcher Scott Field; Abilene, TX	**L** 1-4	Coe (2-2)	**Johnson** **(0-2)**	Whiteaker (1)	1,079	20-12	7-5	
Apr. 10	6:00 pm	ESPN+	Arizona	—	Lupton Stadium	**L** 3-4	Roberts (1-1)	**Brassfield** **(3-3)**	Hicks (4)	4,206	20-13	7-6	
Apr. 11 (DH 1)	2:00 pm	ESPN+	Arizona	—	Lupton Stadium	**W** 5-0	**Davis** **(3-3)**	Bailey (3-2)	—	—	21-13	8-6	
Apr. 11 (DH 2)	6:15 pm	ESPN+	Arizona	—	Lupton Stadium	**L** 2-3	McKinney (2-5)	**Sagouspe** **(2-2)**	Hicks (5)	3,961	21-14	8-7	
Apr. 14	6:00 pm	ESPN+	Tarleton State*	—	Lupton Stadium	**W** 12-5	**Nelson** **(1-0)**	Elizondo (1-1)	—	3,432	22-14	8-7	
Apr. 17	6:30 pm	ESPN+	at Baylor	—	Baylor Ballpark; Waco, TX	**L** 4-11	Davenport (4-1)	**Baumler** **(1-3)**	Bunch (6)	3,505	22-15	8-8	
Apr. 19 (DH 1)	1:00 pm	ESPN+	at Baylor	—	Baylor Ballpark	**W** 5-4	**Quinn** **(3-2)**	Bunch (4-2)	**Sagouspe** **(2)**	—	23-15	9-8	
Apr. 19 (DH 2)	5:00 pm	ESPN+	at Baylor	—	Baylor Ballpark	**W** 10-2	**James** **(5-0)**	Calder (3-4)	—	2,857	24-15	10-8	
Apr. 21	6:00 pm	ESPN+	Dallas Baptist*	—	Lupton Stadium	**W** 6-5 (10 inn.)	**Sagouspe** **(3-2)**	Kroll (0-2)	—	3,390	25-15	10–8	
Apr. 24	6:00 pm	ESPN+	Houston	—	Lupton Stadium	**W** 8-3	**Baumler** **(2–3)**	Hoffman (2–5)	—	3,731	26-15	11–8	
Apr. 25	2:00 pm	ESPN+	Houston	—	Lupton Stadium	**W** 4-2	**Stern** **(2–0)**	Rodriguez (1–1)	**Sagouspe** **(3)**	3,949	27-15	12–8	
Apr. 26	1:00 pm	ESPN+	Houston	—	Lupton Stadium	**W** 14-2 (7 inn.)	**James** **(6–0)**	Roman (2–1)	—	3,881	28-15	13–8	
Apr. 29	6:00 pm	ESPN+	UT Arlington*	—	Lupton Stadium	**W** 12-1 (7 inn.)	**Franco** **(2-0)**	Sears (2-3)	—	3,699	29-15	13-8	

May (4–5)
Date	Time (CST)	TV	Opponent	Rank	Stadium	Score	Win	Loss	Save	Attend	Overall Record	Big 12 Record	Sources
May 1	6:00 pm	ESPN+	at Oklahoma State	—	O'Brate Stadium; Stillwater, OK	**L** 6-7	Barrett (4–1)	**Stern** **(2–1)**	—	4,073	29–16	13–9	
May 2	6:00 pm	ESPN+	at Oklahoma State	—	O'Brate Stadium	**L** 2-9	Pesca (5–3)	**LaPour** **(0–1)**	—	4,623	29–17	13–10	
May 3	1:00 pm	ESPN+	at Oklahoma State	—	O'Brate Stadium	**L** 10-11	Burns (3–1)	**Stern** **(2-2)**	Wech (6)	4,287	29–18	13–11	
May 8	6:00 pm	ESPN+	Utah	—	Lupton Stadium	**W** 3–0	**LaPour** **(1–1)**	McAnelly (2–7)	**Sagouspe** **(4)**	3,913	30-18	14-11	
May 9	2:00 pm	ESPN+	Utah	—	Lupton Stadium	**W** 3–1	**Davis** **(4–3)**	Riske (4–3)	—	4,115	31-18	15-11	
May 10	1:00 pm	ESPN+	Utah	—	Lupton Stadium	**W** 4–3	**Brassfield** **(4–3)**	Graham-Pippin (0–1)	**Sagouspe** **(5)**	3,769	32-18	16-11	
May 14	5:30 pm	ESPN+	at #9 West Virginia	—	Wagener Field at Kendrick Family Ballpark; Morgantown, WV	**L** 0–2	Korn (5–0)	**LaPour** **(1–2)**	Estridge (2)	2,645	32-19	16–12	
May 15	6:30 pm	ESPN+	at #9 West Virginia	—	Wagener Field at Kendrick Family Ballpark	**W** 4–0	**Davis** **(5–3)**	Yehl (7–2)	—	3,759	33-19	17-12	
May 15	11:00 am	ESPN+	at #9 West Virginia	—	Wagener Field at Kendrick Family Ballpark	**L** 4–6	Bassinger (3–2)	**Sagouspe** **(3–3)**	—	3,846	33-20	17-13	

Postseason (0–1)

Big 12 Tournament (0–1)
Date	Time (CST)	TV	Opponent	Seed	Stadium	Score	Win	Loss	Save	Attend	Overall Record	Tourney Record	Sources
May 20	10:00 pm	ESPN+	vs. (11) Kansas State	(7)	Surprise Stadium; Surprise, AZ	**L** 4–9	Arther (3–1)	**LaPour** **(1–3)**	Feser (4)	1,413	33–21	0–1	

* indicates a non-conference game.
(#) All rankings from D1 Baseball Poll on the date of the contest.

== Rankings ==
Ranking movements
	Week																		
Poll	Pre	1	2	3	4	5	6	7	8	9	10	11	12	13	14	15	16	17	Final
Coaches'		*																	
Baseball America																			
NCBWA†																			

† NCBWA ranks 30 teams in their preseason poll, but only ranks 25 teams weekly during the season.
* A new poll was not released for this week, so for comparison purposes, the previous week's ranking is inserted in this week's slot.
