= 2026 Kansas Jayhawks baseball team =

American college baseball season

2026 Kansas Jayhawks baseball

Big 12 regular season and tournament champions NCAA Lawrence Regional Champions

NCAA Lawrence Super Regional, 0–2
- Conference: Big 12 Conference

Ranking
- Coaches: No. 12
- D1Baseball.com: No. 12
- Record: 45–18 (22–8 Big 12)
- Head coach: Dan Fitzgerald (4th season)
- Assistant coaches: Jon Coyne (4th season); Ryan Holland (3rd season); Luke Marbach (3rd season); Thaniel Trumper (2nd season)
- Hitting coach: Tyler Hancock (4th season)
- Pitching coach: Brandon Scott (4th season)
- Home stadium: Hoglund Ballpark

2026 Big 12 Conference baseball standings
	Conf.				Overall
Team	W		L	PCT	W		L	PCT
No. 12 Kansas ‍†‍‡‍^{y}	22	–	8	.733	45	–	16	.738
No. 4 West Virginia ‍‍‍^{y}	21	–	9	.700	47	–	17	.734
Arizona State ‍‍‍^{y}	19	–	11	.633	39	–	21	.650
UCF ‍‍‍^{y}	19	–	11	.633	32	–	23	.582
No. 25 Oklahoma State ‍‍‍^{y}	18	–	12	.600	39	–	22	.639
Cincinnati ‍‍‍^{y}	17	–	13	.567	38	–	22	.633
TCU ‍‍‍	17	–	13	.567	33	–	21	.611
Baylor ‍‍‍	14	–	16	.467	30	–	27	.526
BYU ‍‍‍	14	–	16	.467	28	–	29	.491
Utah ‍‍‍	12	–	18	.400	26	–	25	.510
Kansas State ‍‍‍	11	–	19	.367	30	–	27	.526
Texas Tech ‍‍‍	10	–	20	.333	27	–	28	.491
Arizona ‍‍‍	9	–	21	.300	19	–	34	.358
Houston ‍‍‍	7	–	23	.233	24	–	31	.436
† – Conference champion ‡ – Tournament champion y – Invited to the NCAA tournament As of May 20, 2026; Rankings from D1baseball

The 2026 Kansas Jayhawks baseball team represent the University of Kansas during the 2026 NCAA Division I baseball season. The Jayhawks play their home games at Hoglund Ballpark as a member of the Big 12 Conference. They are led by head coach Dan Fitzgerald, in his fourth season at Kansas.

== Previous season ==
Kansas is coming off of a 43–17 (20–10) season. The team finished second in the Big 12 Conference and went 1–1 in the 2025 Big 12 Conference baseball tournament, reaching the semifinals. The Jayhawks earned an at-large berth into the 2025 NCAA Division I baseball tournament, where they were the two seed in the Fayetteville Regional. Kansas went 0–2 in the regional losing to Creighton and North Dakota State.

== Preseason ==
=== Big 12 Baseball Preseason Poll ===
The Big 12 Baseball Preseason Poll was released on February 5, 2026. Kansas was voted to finish fifth in the Big 12.

Big 12 Baseball Preseason Poll
Predicted finish	Team	Votes (1st place)
1	TCU	169 (13)
2	Arizona	157 (1)
3	West Virginia	137
4	Arizona State	128
T–5	Kansas	112
T–5	Oklahoma State	112
7	Kansas State	87
8	Cincinnati	85
9	Texas Tech	78
10	UCF	66
11	Baylor	54
12	Houston	42
13	BYU	29
14	Utah	18

== Personnel ==
=== Starters ===
Lineup
Pos.	No.	Player.	Year
C	21	Agusto Mungarrieta	Junior
1B	16	Josh Dykhoff	Senior
2B	9	Cade Baldridge	Junior
3B	7	Derek Schlotterback	Junior
SS	2	Tyson LeBlanc	Junior
LF	26	Brady Ballinger	Junior
CF	5	Tyson Owens	Sophomore
RF	31	Jordan Bach	Graduate
DH	23	Daniel Osoria	Senior

Weekend pitching rotation
Day	No.	Player.	Year
Friday	12	Dominic Voegele	Junior
Saturday	34	Mathis Nayral	Junior
Sunday	43	Mason Cook	Sophomore

=== Roster ===
2026 Kansas Jayhawks baseball team
Players
Coaches

#	Pos.	Name	B/T	Height	Weight	Year	Home town
2	INF	Tyson LeBlanc	R/R	6 ft 0 in (1.83 m)	200 lb (91 kg)	Jr	Maurice, LA
3	OF	Landen Lozier	L/R	5 ft 10 in (1.78 m)	175 lb (79 kg)	RS So	Green Bay, WI
4	INF	Max Soliz Jr.	R/R	6 ft 5 in (1.96 m)	210 lb (95 kg)	Sr	Houston, TX
5	C	Tyson Owens	L/R	6 ft 2 in (1.88 m)	195 lb (88 kg)	So	Las Vegas, NV
7	INF	Dylan Schlotterback	R/R	6 ft 0 in (1.83 m)	200 lb (91 kg)	Jr	Lakeway, TX
8	UTL	Gavyn Schlotterback	R/R	6 ft 2 in (1.88 m)	210 lb (95 kg)	So	Lakeway, TX
9	INF	Cade Baldridge	S/R	5 ft 9 in (1.75 m)	190 lb (86 kg)	Jr	Roff, OK
10	OF	Savion Flowers	L/R	6 ft 4 in (1.93 m)	210 lb (95 kg)	So	Chicago, IL
11	RHP	Daniel Lopez	R/R	6 ft 1 in (1.85 m)	195 lb (88 kg)	So	El Paso, TX
12	RHP	Dominic Voegele	R/R	6 ft 2 in (1.88 m)	200 lb (91 kg)	Jr	Columbia, IL
15	RHP	Toby Scheidt	R/R	6 ft 0 in (1.83 m)	195 lb (88 kg)	Sr	Columbia, MO
16	UTL	Josh Dykhoff	L/R	6 ft 1 in (1.85 m)	220 lb (100 kg)	Sr	Bluffton, MN
17	RHP	Carter Fink	R/R	6 ft 1 in (1.85 m)	190 lb (86 kg)	Gr	Macon, GA
18	RHP	Kannon Carr	R/R	6 ft 1 in (1.85 m)	200 lb (91 kg)	Sr	Poplar Bluff, MO
21	C	Augusto Mungarrieta	R/R	6 ft 0 in (1.83 m)	200 lb (91 kg)	Jr	Valencia, VEN
23	INF	Dariel Osoria	R/R	6 ft 0 in (1.83 m)	195 lb (88 kg)	Sr	Bronx, NY
25	RHP	Riane Ritter	R/R	6 ft 1 in (1.85 m)	215 lb (98 kg)	So	Rogers, MN
26	OF	Brady Ballinger	L/L	6 ft 2 in (1.88 m)	225 lb (102 kg)	Jr	Las Vegas, NV
28	RHP	Blake O'Brien	R/R	5 ft 11 in (1.8 m)	195 lb (88 kg)	RS Fr	Overland Park, KS
29	RHP	Boede Rahe	R/R	6 ft 6 in (1.98 m)	240 lb (109 kg)	RS Jr	Marion, IA
30	C	Abel Ney	R/R	6 ft 0 in (1.83 m)	185 lb (84 kg)	Fr	Lawrence, KS
31	OF	Jordan Bach	L/R	6 ft 0 in (1.83 m)	190 lb (86 kg)	Gr	Ladner, BC
32	RHP	Sawyer Cooney	R/R	6 ft 2 in (1.88 m)	190 lb (86 kg)	Fr	Bloomfield Hills, MI
33	LHP	Ty Thomson	L/L	6 ft 5 in (1.96 m)	210 lb (95 kg)	Jr	Council Bluffs, IA
34	RHP	Mathis Nayral	R/R	6 ft 5 in (1.96 m)	210 lb (95 kg)	Jr	Montpellier, FRA
35	LHP	Caleb Deer	L/L	6 ft 7 in (2.01 m)	245 lb (111 kg)	Jr	Overland Park, KS
39	RHP	Maddox Burkitt	R/R	6 ft 2 in (1.88 m)	200 lb (91 kg)	RS Jr	Lawrence, KS
40	RHP	Aiden Cline	L/R	5 ft 10 in (1.78 m)	180 lb (82 kg)	So	Kerrville, TX
41	C	Luke Larson	R/R	6 ft 1 in (1.85 m)	190 lb (86 kg)	Fr	Lakeville, MN
43	RHP	Mason Cook	R/R	6 ft 2 in (1.88 m)	205 lb (93 kg)	So	Keller, TX
44	RHP	Jeremy Allen	R/R	6 ft 0 in (1.83 m)	205 lb (93 kg)	RS Fr	Arlington Heights, IL
45	RHP	Manning West	R/R	6 ft 6 in (1.98 m)	235 lb (107 kg)	RS Jr	Winder, GA
46	LHP	Emerson McKnight	R/L	6 ft 2 in (1.88 m)	210 lb (95 kg)	Fr	Flower Mound, TX
47	RHP	Madden Seidl	R/R	6 ft 5 in (1.96 m)	225 lb (102 kg)	Fr	Emporia, KS
48	RHP	Dane Ebel	L/R	6 ft 1 in (1.85 m)	210 lb (95 kg)	Jr	Van Wert, OH

Head coach

Dan Fitzgerald

Assistant coach(es)

Jon Coyne
Ryan Holland
Luke Marbach
Thaniel Trumper
Tyler Hancock
Brandon Scott

Legend

- (C) Team captain
- (S) Suspended
- (I) Ineligible
- Injured
- Current redshirt

Roster
Last update: May 17, 2026

== Game log ==
2026 Kansas Jayhawks baseball game log (45–18)
Regular season (39–16)

February (6–4)
Date	Time (CT)	TV	Opponent	Rank	Stadium	Score	Win	Loss	Save	Attendance	Overall	B12
February 13	6:30 p.m.	ESPN+	at UTRGV*		UTRGV Baseball Stadium; Edinburg, TX	**L** 4–7	Harrison (1–0)	**Voegele** (0–1)	—	5,863	0–1	—
February 14	6:30 p.m.	ESPN+	at UTRGV*		UTRGV Baseball Stadium	**W** 10–3	**Nayral** (1–0)	Loa (0–1)	—	5,040	1–1	—
February 15	1:00 p.m.	ESPN+	at UTRGV*		UTRGV Baseball Stadium	**W** 8–7	**Rahe** (1–0)	Barrera (0–1)	**Deer** (1)	2,291	2–1	—
February 18	6:05 p.m.	ESPN+	at Lamar*		Vincent–Beck Stadium; Beaumont, TX	**L** 1–4	Dagley (1–0)	**Ritter** (0–1)	Carpio (1)	1,074	2–2	—
February 20	6:00 p.m.	ESPN+	at McNeese*		Joe Miller Ballpark; Lake Charles, LA	**W** 11–2	**Voegele** (1–1)	Achee (0–2)	—	1,138	3–2	—
February 21	1:00 p.m.		at McNeese*		Joe Miller Ballpark	**W** 8–2	**Nayral** (2–0)	Golden (0–1)	—	1,149	4–2	—
February 22	11:00 a.m.	ESPN+	at McNeese*		Joe Miller Ballpark	**W** 6–1	**Seidl** (1–0)	Blanchard (0–1)	—	970	5–2	—
February 25	6:00 p.m.	B1G+	at Minnesota*		U.S. Bank Stadium; Minneapolis, MN	**W** 8–7	**Ritter** (1–1)	Hemmesch (0–1)	**Deer** (2)	284	6–2	—
February 27	6:00 p.m.	B1G+	at Minnesota*		U.S. Bank Stadium	**L** 5–12	Selvig (2–0)	**Voegele** (1–2)	—	376	6–3	—
February 28	3:00 p.m.	B1G+	at Minnesota*		U.S. Bank Stadium	**L** 3–10	Morton (2–0)	**Nayral** (2–1)	—	455	6–4	—

March (13–6)
Date	Time (CT)	TV	Opponent	Rank	Stadium	Score	Win	Loss	Save	Attendance	Overall	B12
March 1	1:00 p.m.	B1G+	at Minnesota*		U.S. Bank Stadium	**W** 8–3	**Ritter** (2–1)	Kruzan (2–1)	**Rahe** (1)	387	7–4	—
March 5	3:00 p.m.	ESPN+	St. Thomas (MN)*		Hoglund Ballpark; Lawrence, KS	**W** 4–2	**Rahe** (2–0)	Endres (0–1)	—	1,063	8–4	—
March 6	1:00 p.m.	ESPN+	St. Thomas (MN)*		Hoglund Ballpark	**W** 11–5	**Voegele** (2–2)	Skilbeck (0–3)	—	765	9–4	—
March 7	2:00 p.m.	ESPN+	vs. St. Thomas (MN)*		Legends Field; Kansas City, KS	**W** 9–8	**Rahe** (3–0)	Pierro (1–1)	—	276	10–4	—
March 8	12:00 p.m.	ESPN+	St. Thomas (MN)*		Hoglund Ballpark	**L** 2–13^{(8)}	Scanlon (1–0)	**Seidl** (1–1)	—	1,274	10–5	—
March 10	6:00 p.m.	ESPN+	at No. 17 TCU*		Lupton Stadium; Fort Worth, TX	**L** 4–9	James (1–0)	Fink (0–1)	—	3,812	10–6	—
March 13	6:30 p.m.	B12N+	at Texas Tech		Rip Griffin Park; Lubbock, TX	**L** 4–11	Pirko (3–1)	Cook (1–1)	—	3,491	10–7	0–1
March 14	2:00 p.m.	B12N+	at Texas Tech		Rip Griffin Park	**L** 9–10	Free (3–1)	**Scheidt** (0–1)	—	3,526	10–8	0–2
March 15	1:00 p.m.	B12N+	at Texas Tech		Rip Griffin Park	**W** 18–7^{(8)}	**West** (1–0)	Burns (1–2)	—	3,193	11–8	1–2
March 18	4:00 p.m.	ESPN+	Missouri*		Hoglund Ballpark	**W** 10–0^{(7)}	**Carr** (1–0)	Sullivan (0–1)	—	1,158	12–8	—
March 20	6:00 p.m.	B12N+	Houston		Hoglund Ballpark	**W** 12–10	**Rahe** (4–0)	Udland (1–1)	—	1,040	13–8	2–2
March 21	2:00 p.m.	B12N+	Houston		Hoglund Ballpark	**W** 9–8	**Carr** (2–0)	Bryan (1–2)	—	1,308	14–8	3–2
March 22	12:00 p.m.	B12N+	Houston		Hoglund Ballpark	**W** 8–4	**West** (2–0)	Baker (2–1)	—	977	15–8	4–2
March 24	6:00 p.m.	ESPN+	Sacramento State*		Hoglund Ballpark	**W** 11–1^{(7)}	**Ritter** (3–1)	Halverson (2–2)	—	1,787	16–8	—
March 25	3:00 p.m.	ESPN+	Sacramento State*		Hoglund Ballpark	**L** 4–7	Wilson (1–3)	**Carr** (2–1)	Carey (1)	820	16–9	—
March 27	4:00 p.m.	B12N+	at No. 25 Cincinnati		UC Baseball Stadium; Cincinnati, OH	**L** 0–5	Taylor (3–1)	**Rahe** (4–1)	Mauro (4)	500	16–10	4–3
March 28	2:00 p.m.	B12N+	at No. 25 Cincinnati		UC Baseball Stadium	**W** 8–2	**Nayral** (3–1)	Brouwer (2–2)	—	826	17–10	5–3
March 29	12:00 p.m.	B12N+	at No. 25 Cincinnati		UC Baseball Stadium	**W** 13–6	**Ritter** (4–1)	Mauro (1–2)	—	719	18–10	6–3
March 31	4:30 p.m.	SECN+	at Missouri*		Taylor Stadium; Columbia, MO	**W** 11–8	**Seidl** (2–1)	Kadden (0–1)	**West** (1)	3,207	19–10	—

April (15–1)
Date	Time (CT)	TV	Opponent	Rank	Stadium	Score	Win	Loss	Save	Attendance	Overall	B12
April 2	6:00 p.m.	B12N+	Utah		Hoglund Ballpark	**W** 14–12	**Scheidt** (1–1)	Lenius (2–1)	—	1,164	20–10	7–3
April 3	11:00 a.m.	B12N+	Utah		Hoglund Ballpark	**W** 14–9	**Nayral** (4–1)	Riske (2–2)	**Carr** (1)	767	21–10	8–3
April 4	12:00 p.m.	B12N+	Utah		Hoglund Ballpark	**W** 13–9	**Cook** (1–1)	Abercrombie (1–2)	—	1,130	22–10	9–3
April 7	6:05 p.m.	B1G+	at No. 19 Nebraska*		Haymarket Park; Lincoln, NE	**W** 5–3	**West** (3–0)	Clark (1–2)	**Rahe** (2)	4,402	23–10	—
April 10	4:00 p.m.	ESPN+	No. 12 UCF		Hoglund Ballpark	**W** 4–3^{(11)}	**Rahe** (5–1)	Murray (3–2)	—	1,113	24–10	10–3
April 11	1:00 p.m.	ESPN+	No. 12 UCF		Hoglund Ballpark	**W** 6–3	**Voegele** (3–2)	Wicker (3–2)	**Ritter** (1)	1,618	25–10	11–3
April 11	5:00 p.m.	ESPN+	No. 12 UCF		Hoglund Ballpark	**W** 3–1	**Cook** (2–1)	Sauser (3–2)	**Rahe** (3)	1,618	26–10	12–3
April 14	6:00 p.m.	ESPN+	Wichita State*	No. 21	Hoglund Ballpark	**W** 5–2	**Seidl** (3–1)	Kortum (3–2)	**Rahe** (4)	1,617	27–10	—
April 17	2:00 p.m.	B12N+	at Oklahoma State	No. 21	O'Brate Stadium; Stillwater, OK	**L** 2–13^{(8)}	Rhodes (2–2)	**Nayral** (4–2)	—	4,000	27–11	12–4
April 18	5:00 p.m.	B12N+	at Oklahoma State	No. 21	O'Brate Stadium	**W** 13–3	**Voegele** (4–2)	Pesca (4–3)	—	8,456	28–11	13–4
April 19	1:00 p.m.	B12N+	at Oklahoma State	No. 21	O'Brate Stadium	**W** 9–6	**Ritter** (5–1)	Blake (0–1)	**Rahe** (5)	4,544	29–11	14–4
April 21	6:00 p.m.	ESPN+	No. 20 Nebraska*	No. 18	Hoglund ballpark	**W** 9–7	**Scheidt** (2–1)	Horn (2–2)	**Rahe** (6)	2,674	30–11	—
April 24	6:00 p.m.	ESPN+	at Kansas State	No. 18	Tointon Family Stadium; Manhattan, KS	**W** 18–6^{(7)}	**Cook** (3–1)	Guyette (5–2)	—	2,344	31–11	15–4
April 25	2:00 p.m.	ESPN+	at Kansas State	No. 18	Tointon Family Stadium	**W** 10–8	**Scheidt** (3–1)	Smith (2–3)	—	2,344	32–11	16–4
April 26	11:00 a.m.	ESPN+	at Kansas State	No. 18	Tointon Family Stadium	**W** 9–7	**Carr** (3–1)	Feser (2–2)	**Rahe** (7)	2,247	33–11	17–4
April 28	6:05 p.m.	ESPN+	at Wichita State*	No. 11	Eck Stadium; Wichita, KS	**W** 14–1^{(8)}	**Fink** (1–1)	Sharp (0–3)	—	2,797	34–11	—

May (5–5)
Date	Time (CT)	TV	Opponent	Rank	Stadium	Score	Win	Loss	Save	Attendance	Overall	B12
May 1	6:00 p.m.	B12N+	Arizona	No. 11	Hoglund Ballpark	**W** 4–2	**Voegele** (5–2)	Kramkowski (1–6)	—	2,500	35–11	18–4
May 2	2:00 p.m.	B12N+	Arizona	No. 11	Hoglund Ballpark	**W** 7–2	**Cook** (4–1)	Bailey (3–4)	—	2,348	36–11	19–4
May 3	12:00 p.m.	B12N+	Arizona	No. 11	Hoglund Ballpark	**W** 11–5	**Scheidt** (4–1)	Fladda (3–2)	—	2,261	37–11	20–4
May 5	6:00 p.m.	NPM	at Creighton*	No. 7	Charles Schwab Field; Omaha, NE	**L** 8–9^{(13)}	Unga (1–0)	**Allen** (0–1)	—	2,182	37–11	—
May 8	6:00 p.m.	B12N+	No. 15 West Virginia	No. 7	Hoglund Ballpark	**L** 1–4	Yehl (7–1)	**Voegele** (5–3)	—	2,192	37–11	20–5
May 9	2:00 p.m.	B12N+	No. 15 West Virginia	No. 7	Hoglund Ballpark	**L** 2–5	Korn (4–0)	**Ritter** (5–2)	—	2,301	37–11	20–6
May 10	11:00 a.m.	B12N+	No. 15 West Virginia	No. 7	Hoglund Ballpark	**L** 2–13^{(8)}	Bassinger (2–2)	**Nayral** (4–3)	—	2,087	37–15	20–7
May 14	7:00 p.m.	ESPN+	at BYU	No. 14	Larry H. Miller Field; Provo, UT	**W** 9–6	**Ritter** (6–2)	Reiser (0–3)	**Rahe** (8)	2,350	38–15	21–7
May 15	7:00 p.m.	ESPN+	at BYU	No. 14	Larry H. Miller Field	**W** 7–6	**Ritter** (7–2)	Gray (7–7)	**Rahe** (9)	2,357	39–15	22–7
May 16	2:00 p.m.	ESPN+	at BYU	No. 14	Larry H. Miller Field	**L** 4–5^{(11)}	Brousseau (4–0)	**Carr** (3–2)	—	2,737	39–16	22–8

Postseason (6–2)

Big 12 tournament (3–0)
Date	Time (CT)	TV	Opponent	Rank	Stadium	Score	Win	Loss	Save	Attendance	Overall	B12T Record
May 21	2:30 p.m.	ESPNU	vs. (8) Baylor	(1) No. 13	Surprise Stadium; Surprise, AZ	**W** 8–7^{(10)}	**Rahe** (6–1)	Bunch (5–3)	—	1,407	40–16	1–0
May 22	6:30 p.m.	ESPN+	vs. (5) No. 19 Oklahoma State	(1) No. 13	Surprise Stadium	**W** 9–2	**Cook** (5–1)	Lund (5–2)	**Ritter** (2)		41–16	2–0
May 23	6:30 p.m.	ESPN2	vs. (2) No. 9 West Virginia	(1) No. 13	Surprise Stadium	**W** 9–0	**Scheidt** (5–1)	Korn (5–1)	—	3,293	42–16	3–0

Lawrence Regional (3–0)
Date	Time (CT)	TV	Opponent	Rank	Stadium	Score	Win	Loss	Save	Attendance	Overall	NCAAT Record
May 29	12:00 p.m.	ESPN+	(4) Northeastern	(1) No. 13	Hoglund Ballpark	**W** 6–3	**Voegele** (6–3)	Rising (5–5)	**Rahe** (10)	3,571	43–16	1–0
May 30	5:30 p.m.	ESPN+	(2) No. 14 Arkansas	(1) No. 13	Hoglund Ballpark	**W** 5–3	**Ritter** (8–2)	Dietz (7–4)	**Rahe** (11)	4,042	44–16	2–0
May 31	5:00 p.m.	ESPN+	(2) No. 14 Arkansas	(1) No. 13	Hoglund Ballpark	**W** 13–10	**West** (4–0)	Gibler (5–3)	—	4,007	45–16	3–0

Lawrence Super Regional (0–2)
Date	Time (CT)	TV	Opponent	Rank	Stadium	Score	Win	Loss	Save	Attendance	Overall	NCAAT Record
June 6	5:00 p.m.	ESPN2	Oklahoma	(15) No. 13	Hoglund Ballpark	**L** 1–8	Rager (5–3)	**Voegele** (6–4)	Mercurius (3)	4,415	45–17	0–1
June 7	5:00 p.m.	ESPN	Oklahoma	(15) No. 13	Hoglund Ballpark	**L** 2–13	Smithburg (2–0)	**Cook** (5–2)	—	4,249	45–18	0–2

Legend: = Win = Loss = Canceled
Bold = Kansas team member
Rankings are based on the team's current ranking in the D1Baseball poll.

== Rankings ==
Ranking movements Legend: ██ Increase in ranking ██ Decrease in ranking — = Not ranked RV = Received votes
	Week																	
Poll	Pre	1	2	3	4	5	6	7	8	9	10	11	12	13	14	15	16	Final
Coaches'	RV	RV*	RV	—	—	RV	—	—	RV	21	17	11	9	17	16	15	15*	12
Baseball America	—	—	—	—	—	—	—	—	—	19	15	11	9	16	14	14*	14*	13
NCBWA†	RV	RV	RV	—	RV	RV	—	RV	RV	23	17	11	9	17	14	14*	8	12
D1Baseball	—	—	—	—	—	—	—	—	—	—	18	11	7	14	13	13	13*	12
Perfect Game	—	—	—	—	—	—	—	—	—	21	18	12	9	17	16	16*	16*	12

† NCBWA ranks 30 teams in their preseason poll, but only ranks 25 teams weekly during the season.
* A new poll was not released for this week, so for comparison purposes, the previous week's ranking is inserted in this week's slot.
