= 2026 Arizona State Sun Devils baseball team =

American college baseball season

2026 Arizona State Sun Devils baseball

Lincoln Regional, 2–2
- Conference: Big 12 Conference

Ranking
- Coaches: No. 22
- D1Baseball.com: No. 22
- Record: 39–21 (19–11 Big 12)
- Head coach: Willie Bloomquist (5th season)
- Assistant coaches: Sam Peraza (5th season); Dan Jaffe (5th season); Mike Goff (5th season); Sean McSheffery (3rd season)
- Hitting coach: Jason Ellison (2nd season)
- Pitching coach: Jeremy Accardo (2nd season)
- Home stadium: Phoenix Municipal Stadium

2026 Big 12 Conference baseball standings
	Conf.				Overall
Team	W		L	PCT	W		L	PCT
No. 12 Kansas ‍†‍‡‍^{y}	22	–	8	.733	45	–	16	.738
No. 4 West Virginia ‍‍‍^{y}	21	–	9	.700	47	–	17	.734
Arizona State ‍‍‍^{y}	19	–	11	.633	39	–	21	.650
UCF ‍‍‍^{y}	19	–	11	.633	32	–	23	.582
No. 25 Oklahoma State ‍‍‍^{y}	18	–	12	.600	39	–	22	.639
Cincinnati ‍‍‍^{y}	17	–	13	.567	38	–	22	.633
TCU ‍‍‍	17	–	13	.567	33	–	21	.611
Baylor ‍‍‍	14	–	16	.467	30	–	27	.526
BYU ‍‍‍	14	–	16	.467	28	–	29	.491
Utah ‍‍‍	12	–	18	.400	26	–	25	.510
Kansas State ‍‍‍	11	–	19	.367	30	–	27	.526
Texas Tech ‍‍‍	10	–	20	.333	27	–	28	.491
Arizona ‍‍‍	9	–	21	.300	19	–	34	.358
Houston ‍‍‍	7	–	23	.233	24	–	31	.436
† – Conference champion ‡ – Tournament champion y – Invited to the NCAA tournament As of May 20, 2026; Rankings from D1baseball

The 2026 Arizona State Sun Devils baseball team represent Arizona State University during the 2026 NCAA Division I baseball season. The Sun Devils play their home games at Phoenix Municipal Stadium as a member of the Big 12 Conference. They are led by head coach Willie Bloomquist, in his fifth season at Arizona State.

== Previous season ==
Arizona State is coming off of a 36–24 (18–12) season. The team finished fifth in the Big 12 Conference and went 0–1 in the 2025 Big 12 Conference baseball tournament. The Sun Devils earned an at-large berth into the 2025 NCAA Division I baseball tournament, where they were the three seed in the Los Angeles Regional. Arizona State went 1–2 in the regional, defeating UC Irvine in the opening game, losing to hosts, UCLA in the second round, before being eliminated against UC Irvine in Game 5.

== Preseason ==
=== Big 12 Baseball Preseason Poll ===
The Big 12 Baseball Preseason Poll was released on February 5, 2026. Arizona State was voted to finish fourth in the Big 12.

Big 12 Baseball Preseason Poll
Predicted finish	Team	Votes (1st place)
1	TCU	169 (13)
2	Arizona	157 (1)
3	West Virginia	137
4	Arizona State	128
T–5	Kansas	112
T–5	Oklahoma State	112
7	Kansas State	87
8	Cincinnati	85
9	Texas Tech	78
10	UCF	66
11	Baylor	54
12	Houston	42
13	BYU	29
14	Utah	18

== Rankings ==
Ranking movements Legend: ██ Increase in ranking ██ Decrease in ranking — = Not ranked RV = Received votes
	Week																	
Poll	Pre	1	2	3	4	5	6	7	8	9	10	11	12	13	14	15	16	Final
Coaches'	RV	RV*	RV	RV	RV	RV	22	24	21	22	25	21	17	22	22	22	22*	RV
Baseball America	—	—	—	—	—	24	18	22	19	21	23	21	19	—	24	24*	24*	—
NCBWA†	RV	RV	RV	RV	RV	RV	21	22	21	21	25	22	19	23	23	23*	RV	RV
D1Baseball	—	—	—	—	—	—	22	25	20	23	25	19	16	22	21	22	22*	—
Perfect Game	—	—	—	—	—	—	17	18	18	18	21	18	16	25	24	24*	24*	—

† NCBWA ranks 30 teams in their preseason poll, but only ranks 25 teams weekly during the season.
* A new poll was not released for this week, so for comparison purposes, the previous week's ranking is inserted in this week's slot.

== Schedule and results ==
2026 Arizona State Sun Devils baseball game log (39–21)
Legend: = Win = Loss = Canceled Bold = Arizona State team member
Regular season (36–18)

February (8–3)
Date	Time (MST)	TV	Opponent	Rank	Stadium	Score	Win	Loss	Save	Attend	Overall Record	Big 12 Record	Sources
Feb. 13	6:35 pm	ESPN+	Omaha*	—	Phoenix Municipal Stadium; Phoenix, AZ	**W** 7-2	**Carlon** **(1-0)**	Foertsch (0-1)	—	3,690	1-0	—	
Feb. 14	1:05 pm	ESPN+	Omaha*	—	Phoenix Municipal Stadium	**W** 11-5	**Butler** **(1-0)**	Iverson (0-1)	—	3,188	2-0	—	
Feb. 15	1:05 pm	ESPN+	Omaha*	—	Phoenix Municipal Stadium	**W** 6-4	**Fitzpatrick** **(1-0)**	Mabee (0-1)	**Schaefer** **(1)**	3,436	3-0	—	
Feb. 17	6:35 pm	ESPN+	UConn*	—	Phoenix Municipal Stadium	**W** 17-7	**Klecker** **(1-0)**	Aasland (0-1)	—	2,834	4-0	—	
Feb. 20	6:35 pm	ESPN+	St. John's*	—	Phoenix Municipal Stadium	**W** 9-1	**Carlon** **(2-0)**	O'Leary (0-1)	—	3,693	5-0	—	
Feb. 21	1:05 pm	ESPN+	St. John's*	—	Phoenix Municipal Stadium	**W** 3-1	**Butler** **(2-0)**	Chaffee (0-2)	**Schaefer** **(2)**	2,804	6-0	—	
Feb. 22	1:05 pm	ESPN+	St. John's*	—	Phoenix Municipal Stadium	**W** 16-6	**Alba** **(1-0)**	Frederick (0-1)	—	2,816	7-0	—	
Feb. 24	3:00 pm	SECN+	at #13 Oklahoma*	—	L. Dale Mitchell Park; Norman, OK	**W** 15-3 (7 inn.)	**Klecker** **(2-0)**	Catalano (0-1)	—	1,413	8-0	—	
Feb. 25	3:00 pm	SECN+	at #13 Oklahoma*	—	L. Dale Mitchell Park	**L** 3-4	Cleveland (1-0)	**Schaefer** **(0-1)**	—	1,754	8-1	—	
Feb. 27	10:00 am	FloSports	vs. #4 Mississippi State*	—	Globe Life Field; Arlington, TX	**L** 4-8	McPherson (2-0)	**Carlon** **(2-1)**	—	7,181	8-2	—	
Feb. 28	10:00 am	FloSports	vs. #20 Tennessee*	—	Globe Life Field	**L** 3-5	Mack (2-1)	**Linder** **(0-1)**	Appenzeller (1)	13,097	8-3	—	

March (13–5)
Date	Time (MST)	TV	Opponent	Rank	Stadium	Score	Win	Loss	Save	Attend	Overall Record	Big 12 Record	Sources
Mar. 1	5:30 pm	FloSports	vs. #20 Texas A&M*	—	Globe Life Field	**L** 3-9	Freshcorn (2-0)	**Alba** **(1-1)**	—	8,903	8-4	—	
Mar. 6	6:35 pm	ESPN+	LMU*	—	Phoenix Municipal Stadium	**W** 12-4	**Linder** **(1-1)**	Johnson (1-2)	—	3,240	9-4	—	
Mar. 7	6:35 pm	ESPN+	LMU*	—	Phoenix Municipal Stadium	**W** 9-1	**Penn** **(1-0)**	Behrens (2-1)	—	3,732	10-4	—	
Mar. 8	1:05 pm	ESPN+	LMU*	—	Phoenix Municipal Stadium	**W** 29-4	**Alba** **(2-1)**	Laine (1-2)	—	3,021	11-4	—	
Mar. 10	6:35 pm	ESPN+	Arizona*	—	Phoenix Municipal Stadium	**W** 10-4	**Penn** **(2-0)**	McKinney (0-3)	—	4,678	12-4	—	
Mar. 13	6:35 pm	ESPN+	#17 TCU	—	Phoenix Municipal Stadium	**L** 4-5	Stern; 2-0)	**Edwards** **(0-1)**	Sagouspe (1)	3,858	12-5	0-1	
Mar. 14	6:35 pm	ESPN+	#17 TCU	—	Phoenix Municipal Stadium	**W** 15-8	**Penn** **(3-0)**	Davis (0-3)	—	4,483	13-5	1-1	
Mar. 15	1:05 pm	ESPN+	#17 TCU	—	Phoenix Municipal Stadium	**W** 4-0	**Klecker** **(3-0)**	Baumler (0-1)	—	3,013	14-5	2-1	
Mar. 17	6:35 pm	ESPN+	Grand Canyon*	—	Phoenix Municipal Stadium	**W** 4-3 (10 inn.)	**Edwards** **(1-1)**	Cunnings (1-1)	—	4,479	15-5	2-1	
Mar. 20	4:00 pm	ESPN+	at Kansas State	—	Tointon Stadium; Manhattan, KS	**W** 5-4	**Fitzpatrick** **(2-0)**	Butler (0-2)	**Schaefer** **(3)**	2,344	16-5	3-1	
Mar. 21	2:00 pm	ESPN+	at Kansas State	—	Tointon Stadium	**W** 18-12	**Fitzpatrick** **(3-0)**	Flores (1-1)	—	2,344	17-5	4-1	
Mar. 22	11:00 am	ESPN+	at Kansas State	—	Tointon Stadium	**L** 1-12 (7 inn.)	Sheffield (5-0)	**Klecker** **(3-1)**	—	2,173	17-6	4-2	
Mar. 23	6:35 pm	ESPN+	vs. UNLV*	—	Las Vegas Ballpark; Las Vegas, NV	**W** 12-11	**Barrett** **(1-0)**	Marton (0-1)	**Schaefer** **(4)**	1,355	18-6	4-2	
Mar. 25	6:35 pm	ESPN+	New Mexico State*	#22	Phoenix Municipal Stadium	**W** 10-4	**Butler** **(3-0)**	Davis (0-1)	—	3,748	19-6	4-2	
Mar. 27	6:35 pm	ESPN+	#17 West Virginia	#22	Phoenix Municipal Stadium	**W** 14-4 (8 inn.)	**Penn** **(4-0)**	Montesa (3-3)	—	3,788	20-6	5-2	
Mar. 28	6:35 pm	ESPN+	#17 West Virginia	#22	Phoenix Municipal Stadium	**L** 7-13	Yehl (5-0)	**Overbay** **(0-1)**	—	3,299	20-7	5-3	
Mar. 29	5:05 pm	ESPN2	#17 West Virginia	#22	Phoenix Municipal Stadium	**L** 5-9	Cole (4-0)	**Klecker** **(3-2)**	Perez (6)	3,377	20-8	5-4	
Mar. 30	6:35 pm	ESPN+	San Diego State*	#22	Phoenix Municipal Stadium	**W** 6-2	**Linder** **(2-1)**	Lemke (0-2)	—	3,001	21-8	5-4	

April (10–6)
Date	Time (MST)	TV	Opponent	Rank	Stadium	Score	Win	Loss	Save	Attend	Overall Record	Big 12 Record	Sources
Apr. 2	6:05 pm	ESPN+	at Arizona	#25	Hi Corbett Field; Tucson, AZ	**W** 6-4	**Overbay** **(1-1)**	Kramkowski (1-4)	**Schaefer** **(5)**	3,165	22-8	6-4	
Apr. 3	6:05 pm	ESPN+	at Arizona	#25	Hi Corbett Field	**L** 4-7	McKinney (1-5)	**Edwards** **(1-2)**	Hicks (1)	5,011	22-9	6-5	
Apr. 4	6:05 pm	ESPN2	at Arizona	#25	Hi Corbett Field	**W** 15-6	**Linder** **(3-1)**	Fladda (2-1)	—	3,096	23-9	7-5	
Apr. 7	6:05 pm	ESPN+	at Grand Canyon*	#20	Brazell Field at GCU Ballpark; Phoenix, AZ	**W** 12-8	**Guy** **(1-0)**	Smith (0-1)	**Overbay** **(1)**	2,252	24-9	7-5	
Apr. 8	6:35 pm	ESPN+	UNLV*	#20	Phoenix Municipal Stadium	**L** 5-7	Sundloff (2-0)	**Musso** **(0-1)**	Evangelista (1)	2,689	24-10	7-5	
Apr. 10	6:35 pm	ESPN+	Utah	#20	Phoenix Municipal Stadium	**L** 4-10	Gazaway (3-2)	**Carlon** **(2-2)**	—	4,094	24-11	7-6	
Apr. 11	6:35 pm	ESPN+	Utah	#20	Phoenix Municipal Stadium	**W** 14-13	**Buxton** **(1-0)**	Lenius (2-2)	—	3,356	25-11	8-6	
Apr. 12	1:05 pm	ESPN+	Utah	#20	Phoenix Municipal Stadium	**W** 5-2	**Klecker** **(4-2)**	Graham-Pippin (0-1)	**Alba** **(1)**	2,850	26-11	9-6	
Apr. 13	6:35 pm	ESPN+	Arizona*	#20	Phoenix Municipal Stadium	**L** 3-5 (11 inn.)	Hicks (3-0)	**Linder** **(3-2)**	—	6,003	26-12	9-6	
Apr. 16	12:00 pm	ESPN+	at BYU	#23	Larry H. Miller Sports Complex; Provo, UT	**L** 9-19 (7 inn.)	Crane (1-2)	**Barrett** **(1-1)**	—	1,584	26-13	9-7	
Apr. 17	5:00 pm	ESPN+	at BYU	#23	Larry H. Miller Sports Complex	**W** 13–0 (7 inn.)	**Carlon** **(3–2)**	Reiser (0–2)	—	2,193	27–13	10–7	
Apr. 18	12:00 pm	ESPN+	at BYU	#23	Larry H. Miller Sports Complex	**W** 12–8	**Fitzpatrick** **(4-0)**	Johnson (2-4)	**Schaefer** **(5)**	2,286	28-13	11–7	
Apr. 22	6:35 pm	ESPN+	New Mexico State*	#25	Phoenix Municipal Stadium	**L** 9-10 (10 inn.)	Weekly (2–1)	**Fitzpatrick** **(4–1)**	Timmons (1)	2,794	28-14	11–7	
Apr. 24	6:35 pm	ESPN+	Baylor	#25	Phoenix Municipal Stadium	**W** 11–2	**Carlon** **(4-2)**	Davenport (4–2)	—	4,074	29–14	12-7	
Apr. 25	6:35 pm	ESPN+	Baylor	#25	Phoenix Municipal Stadium	**W** 4–2	**Linder** **(4-2)**	Wallace (3–4)	**Schaefer** **(6)**	4,062	30-14	13-7	
Apr. 26	1:05 pm	ESPN+	Baylor	#25	Phoenix Municipal Stadium	**W** 4–2	**Klecker** **(5-2)**	Calder (3-5)	**Alba** **(2)**	3,290	31-14	14-7	

May (5–4)
Date	Time (MST)	TV	Opponent	Rank	Stadium	Score	Win	Loss	Save	Attend	Overall Record	Big 12 Record	Sources
May 1	3:00 pm	ESPN+	at UCF	#19	John Euliano Park; Orlando, FL	**W** 9–4	**Carlon** **(5–2)**	Gray (5–1)	—	2,344	32–14	15–7	
May 2	10:00 am	ESPN+	at UCF	#19	John Euliano Park	**L** 2–4	Kimball (1–1)	**Overbay** **(1–2)**	Jones (1)	1,856	32–15	15–8	
May 3	10:00 am	ESPN+	at UCF	#19	John Euliano Park	**W** 6–3	**Schaefer** **(1–1)**	Schoneboom (2–2)	—	2,195	33-15	16–8	
May 5	—	—	at Missouri*	—	Taylor Stadium; Columbia, MO	**Canceled**			—		—	—	
May 8	6:05 pm	ESPN2	Oklahoma State	#16	Phoenix Municipal Stadium	**L** 6–9	Barrett (5–1)	**Schaefer** **(1–2)**	Pesca (1)	3,636	33-16	16-9	
May 9	6:05 pm	ESPN2	Oklahoma State	#16	Phoenix Municipal Stadium	**L** 6–13	Rhodes (3–2)	**Alba** **(2–1)**	—	3,754	33-17	16-10	
May 10	1:05 pm	ESPN+	Oklahoma State	#16	Phoenix Municipal Stadium	**W** 11–7	**Klecker** **(6–2)**	Phillips (3–3)	—	2,910	34-17	17-10	
May 12	—	—	at Grand Canyon*	—	Brazell Field at GCU Ballpark	**Canceled**			—		—	—	
May 14	4:30 pm	ESPN+	at Houston	#22	Schroeder Park; Houston, TX	**W** 4–3	**Penn** **(5–0)**	Rodriguez (2–2)	**Schaefer** **(6)**	762	35-17	18–10	
May 15	4:30 pm	ESPN+	at Houston	#22	Schroeder Park	**L** 3–5	Boushele (2–1)	**Overbay** **(1–3)**	—	1,118	35-18	18-11	
May 16	11:00 am	ESPN+	at Houston	#22	Schroeder Park	**W** 8–3	**Alba** **(3–2)**	Cooper (2–3)	—	984	36-18	19-11	

Postseason (3–3)

Big 12 Tournament (1–1)
Date	Time (MST)	TV	Opponent	Seed	Stadium	Score	Win	Loss	Save	Attend	Overall Record	Tourney Record	Sources
May 21	8:00 pm	ESPNU	vs. (6) #17 Cincinnati	(3) #21	Surprise Stadium; Surprise, AZ	**W** 10–2	**Penn** **(6–0)**	Taylor (6–3)	—	2,119	37–18	1-0	
May 22	8:00 pm	ESPN+	vs. (2) #9 West Virginia	(3) #21	Surprise Stadium	**L** 3–7	Bassinger (4–2)	**Edwards** **(1–3)**	Montesa (1)	2,153	37–19	1–1	

NCAA Tournament: Lincoln Regional (2-2)
Date	Time (MST)	TV	Opponent	Seed	Stadium	Score	Win	Loss	Save	Attend	Overall Record	Tourney Record	Sources
May 29	6:00 pm	ESPN2	vs. (2) #18 Ole Miss	(3) #22	Haymarket Park; Lincoln, NE	**L** 6–7 (14 inn.)	Calhoun (4–3)	**Alba** **(3–3)**	—	7,564	37−20	0–1	
May 30	12:00 pm	ESPN+	vs. (4) South Dakota State	(3) #22	Haymarket Park	**W** 17–0	**Klecker** **(7–2)**	McDowell (4–3)	—	7,571	38-20	1–1	
May 31	12:00 pm	ESPN	vs. (1) #13 Nebraska	(3) #22	Haymarket Park	**W** 11-8	**Guy** **(2-0)**	Blachowicz (4-4)	**Schaefer** **(7)**	7,748	39-20	2-1	
May 31	5:00 pm	ESPNU	vs. (2) #18 Ole Miss	(3) #22	Haymarket Park	**L** 4-5 (10 inn.)	Robertson (4-1)	**Schaefer** **(1-3)**	—	7561	39-21	2-2	

* indicates a non-conference game. All rankings from D1 Baseball Poll on the date of the contest.
