= 2026 Arizona Wildcats baseball team =

College baseball team in the 2025 NCAA Division I season

2026 Arizona Wildcats baseball
- Conference: Big 12 Conference
- Record: 19–34 (9–21 Big 12)
- Head coach: Chip Hale (5th season)
- Assistant coaches: Trip Couch (5th season); Toby Demello (5th season); Sean Kenny (1st season)
- Home stadium: Hi Corbett Field

2026 Big 12 Conference baseball standings
| | Conf. | | | | Overall |
| Team | W | | L | PCT | W | | L | PCT |
|---|---|---|---|---|---|---|---|---|
| No. 12 Kansas ‍†‍‡‍^{y} | 22 | – | 8 | .733 | 45 | – | 16 | .738 |
| No. 4 West Virginia ‍‍‍^{y} | 21 | – | 9 | .700 | 47 | – | 17 | .734 |
| Arizona State ‍‍‍^{y} | 19 | – | 11 | .633 | 39 | – | 21 | .650 |
| UCF ‍‍‍^{y} | 19 | – | 11 | .633 | 32 | – | 23 | .582 |
| No. 25 Oklahoma State ‍‍‍^{y} | 18 | – | 12 | .600 | 39 | – | 22 | .639 |
| Cincinnati ‍‍‍^{y} | 17 | – | 13 | .567 | 38 | – | 22 | .633 |
| TCU ‍‍‍ | 17 | – | 13 | .567 | 33 | – | 21 | .611 |
| Baylor ‍‍‍ | 14 | – | 16 | .467 | 30 | – | 27 | .526 |
| BYU ‍‍‍ | 14 | – | 16 | .467 | 28 | – | 29 | .491 |
| Utah ‍‍‍ | 12 | – | 18 | .400 | 26 | – | 25 | .510 |
| Kansas State ‍‍‍ | 11 | – | 19 | .367 | 30 | – | 27 | .526 |
| Texas Tech ‍‍‍ | 10 | – | 20 | .333 | 27 | – | 28 | .491 |
| Arizona ‍‍‍ | 9 | – | 21 | .300 | 19 | – | 34 | .358 |
| Houston ‍‍‍ | 7 | – | 23 | .233 | 24 | – | 31 | .436 |
† – Conference champion ‡ – Tournament champion y – Invited to the NCAA tournament As of May 20, 2026; Rankings from D1baseball

The 2026 Arizona Wildcats baseball team represents the University of Arizona during the 2026 NCAA Division I baseball season. The Wildcats play their home games for the 15th season at Hi Corbett Field, with the team being coached by Chip Hale in his 5th season at Arizona. This marks Arizona's 2nd season participating as a member of the Big 12 Conference after departing the Pac-12 Conference.

== Previous season ==
The Wildcats finished the 2025 season with a record of 44–21 (18–12 Conf.), good for 4th place. In the Big 12 Tournament in Arlington, TX, as a #4 seed they would beat BYU in the quarterfinals, West Virginia in the Semifinals, and would beat TCU in the Championship Game in 10 innings. The team would be in the 2025 NCAA tournament, they would be in the Chapel Hill Regional, where they would beat Cal Poly 3–2, Utah Valley 14–4, win the rematch game against Cal Poly 14–0, to move to the Super Regional to play against No. 5 North Carolina, losing Game 1 by the score of 18–2, but would win Game 2 by a score of 10–8, and Game 3 by the score of 4–3, to make their 20th Men's College World Series, where they would lose to No. 11 Coastal Carolina by the score of 7–4, and Louisville by the score of 8–3, ending their season record at 44–21.

== Coaches poll ==
Coaches' Poll
| Predicted finish | Team | Points |
|---|---|---|
| 1 | TCU | 169 (13) |
| 2 | Arizona | 157 (1) |
| 3 | West Virginia | 137 |
| 4 | Arizona State | 128 |
| T-5 | Kansas | 112 |
| T-5 | Oklahoma State | 112 |
| 7 | Kansas State | 87 |
| 8 | Cincinnati | 85 |
| 9 | Texas Tech | 78 |
| 10 | UCF | 66 |
| 11 | Baylor | 54 |
| 12 | Houston | 42 |
| 13 | BYU | 29 |
| 14 | Utah | 18 |

== Personnel ==
=== Roster ===
2026 Arizona Wildcats baseball roster
| Pitchers • 7 - Andrew Jacobs Jr. - Freshman • 8 - Mason Russell - Sophomore • 10 - Patrick Morris - Senior • 11 - Benton Hickman - Freshman • 17 - Owen Kramkowski - Junior • 19 - Evan Brandt - Junior • 22 - Smith Bailey - Sophomore • 24 - Luc Fladda - Senior • 28 - Matthew Martinez - Senior • 30 - Corey Kling - Junior • 34 - Collin McKinney - Junior • 35 - JT Drake - Senior • 37 - Tony Pluta - Senior • 39 - Nolan Straniero - Senior • 40 - Jack Lafflam - Freshman • 49 - Maclain Roberts - Junior • 51 - Samuel Round - Sophomore • 99 - Garrett Hicks - Senior | Catchers • 18 - Beau Sylvester - Senior • 29 - Roman Meyers - Sophomore • 45 - Joe Forbes - Freshman Infielders • 2 - Ethan Guerra - Senior • 3 - Andrew Cain - Junior • 5 - Mathis Meurant - Senior • 13 - Cash Brennan - Freshman • 25 - Tyler Bickers - Senior • 31 - Gavin Triezenberg - Freshman • 33 - Maddox Mihalakis - Senior • 36 - Tony Lira - Freshman • 44 - Jackson Forbes - Freshman • 44 - Nate Novitske - Freshman | Outfielders • 1 - Sean Barta - Sophomore • 4 - Carson McEntire - Sophomore • 12 - Easton Breyfogle - Junior • 14 - Gunner Geile - Sophomore • 20 - Tyler Russell - Sophomore • 23 - TJ Adams - Junior • 27 - Dom Rodriguez - Senior • 41 - Chaz McNelis - Sophomore Utility • 16 - Caleb Danzeisen - Sophomore |

=== Coaches ===
2026 Arizona Wildcats baseball coaching staff
- Chip Hale - Head coach
- Trip Couch - Assistant coach
- Toby Demello - Assistant coach
- Sean Kenny - Assistant coach

=== Opening day ===
Opening Day Starters
| Name | Position |
|---|---|
| Tyler Bickers | Second baseman |
| Maddox Mihalakis | Third baseman |
| Andrew Cain | Right fielder |
| Tony Lira | First baseman |
| Beau Sylvester | Left fielder |
| Roman Meyers | Catcher |
| Carson McEntire | Center Fielder |
| Nate Novitske | Designated hitter |
| Mathis Meurant | Shortstop |
| Owen Kramkowski | Starting pitcher |

== Schedule and results ==
2026 Arizona Wildcats Baseball Game Log
Regular Season
| Date | Opponent | Rank | Site/Stadium | Score | Win | Loss | Save | Overall Record | Big 12 Record |
|---|---|---|---|---|---|---|---|---|---|
| Feb 13 | vs. Stanford | #24 | Surprise Stadium • Surprise, AZ | L 7–10 | Gomez (1–0) | Straniero (0–1) | Erspamer (1) | 0–1 | |
| Feb 14 | vs. #12 Oregon State | #24 | Surprise Stadium • Surprise, AZ | L 6–7 | Scott (1–0) | Hickman (0–1) | Roblez (1) | 0–2 | |
| Feb 15 | vs. Michigan | #24 | Surprise Stadium • Surprise, AZ | L 1–4 | Barr (1–0) | McKinney (0–1) | Brinham (1) | 0–3 | |
| Feb 17 | Omaha | | Hi Corbett Field • Tucson, AZ | L 1–3 | Meyer (1–0) | Lafflam (0–1) | Moquin (1) | 0–4 | |
| Feb 19 | UConn | | Hi Corbett Field • Tucson, AZ | L 4–6^{12} | Shaw (1–0) | Kling (0–1) | None | 0–5 | |
| Feb 20 | UConn | | Hi Corbett Field • Tucson, AZ | L 0–4 | West (1–1) | Kramkowski (0–1) | Meyers (1) | 0–6 | |
| Feb 21 | UConn | | Hi Corbett Field • Tucson, AZ | W 5–4 | Hicks (1–0) | Garbinski (0–1) | Brandt (1) | 1–6 | |
| Feb 22 | UConn | | Hi Corbett Field • Tucson, AZ | L 2–11 | Pudvar (1–1) | McKinney (0–2) | Finn (2) | 1–7 | |
| Feb 27 | vs. Oregon | | Las Vegas Ballpark • Summerlin South, NV | L 2–7 | Bradley (1–0) | Kramkowski (0–2) | None | 1–8 | |
| Feb 28 | vs. Vanderbilt | | Las Vegas Ballpark • Summerlin South, NV | W 5–1 | Bailey (1–0) | Kranzler (1–1) | None | 2–8 | |
| Mar 1 | vs. UC Irvine | | Las Vegas Ballpark • Summerlin South, NV | W 7–1 | Fladda (1–0) | Castles (0–2) | None | 3–8 | |
| Mar 3 | Grand Canyon | | Hi Corbett Field • Tucson, AZ | L 5–7 | Robb (1–1) | Morris (0–1) | Gregory (1) | 3–9 | |
| Mar 6 | Fresno State | | Hi Corbett Field • Tucson, AZ | W 6–0 | Kramkowski (1–2) | Patrick (1–2) | None | 4–9 | |
| Mar 7 | Fresno State | | Hi Corbett Field • Tucson, AZ | W 9–5 | Bailey (2–0) | Heintz (0–1) | Hicks (1) | 5–9 | |
| Mar 8 | Fresno State | | Hi Corbett Field • Tucson, AZ | W 14–4^{8} | Fladda (2–0) | Arreola (0–1) | None | 6–9 | |
| Mar 10 | at Arizona State | | Phoenix Municipal Stadium • Phoenix, AZ | L 4–10 | Penn (2–0) | McKinney (0–3) | None | 6–10 | |
| Mar 13 | at Utah | | America First Ballpark • Salt Lake City, UT | W 8–6^{11} | Hicks (2–0) | Cova (0–1) | None | 7–10 | 1–0 |
| Mar 14 | at Utah | | America First Ballpark • Salt Lake City, UT | L 6–7^{10} | Lenius (1–0) | Brandt (0–1) | None | 7–11 | 1–1 |
| Mar 15 | at Utah | | America First Ballpark • Salt Lake City, UT | L 7–8 | Galindo (1–0) | Martinez (0–1) | None | 7–12 | 1–2 |
| Mar 17 | New Mexico | | Hi Corbett Field • Tucson, AZ | L 3–6 | Jackson (1–0) | McKinney (0–4) | Grubbs (1) | 7–13 | |
| Mar 20 | Texas Tech | | Hi Corbett Field • Tucson, AZ | L 5–9 | Espinoza (1–0) | Roberts (0–1) | None | 7–14 | 1–3 |
| Mar 21 | Texas Tech | | Hi Corbett Field • Tucson, AZ | W 14–6 | Bailey (3–0) | Mohan (0–2) | None | 8–14 | 2–3 |
| Mar 22 | Texas Tech | | Hi Corbett Field • Tucson, AZ | L 10–12 | Lowe (1–0) | Hickman (0–2) | Jordan (1) | 8–15 | 2–4 |
| Mar 24 | Grand Canyon | | Hi Corbett Field • Tucson, AZ | W 5–4 | Lafflam (1–1) | Kiemele (0–1) | Hicks (2) | 9–15 | |
| Mar 27 | at UCF | | John Euliano Park • Orlando, FL | L 6–11 | Smith (3–1) | Kramkowski (1–3) | Jones (2) | 9–16 | 2–5 |
| Mar 28 | at UCF | | John Euliano Park • Orlando, FL | L 3–13 | Gray (3–0) | Bailey (3–1) | Sosnowski (2) | 9–17 | 2–6 |
| Mar 29 | at UCF | | John Euliano Park • Orlando, FL | L 2–3^{13} | Murray (2–1) | McKinney (0–5) | None | 9–18 | 2–7 |
| Mar 31 | #13 West Virginia | | Hi Corbett Field • Tucson, AZ | L 4–7 | Estridge (2–0) | Brandt (0–2) | Bassinger (1) | 9–19 | |
| Apr 2 | #25 Arizona State | | Hi Corbett Field • Tucson, AZ | L 4–6 | Overbay (1–1) | Kramkowski (1–4) | Schaefer (5) | 9–20 | 2–8 |
| Apr 3 | #25 Arizona State | | Hi Corbett Field • Tucson, AZ | W 7–4 | McKinney (1–5) | Edwards (1–2) | Hicks (3) | 10–20 | 3–8 |
| Apr 4 | #25 Arizona State | | Hi Corbett Field • Tucson, AZ | L 6–15 | Linder (3–1) | Fladda (2–1) | None | 10–21 | 3–9 |
| Apr 8 | New Mexico State | | Hi Corbett Field • Tucson, AZ | W 13–3^{7} | Morris (1–1) | Price (3–2) | None | 11–21 | |
| Apr 10 | at TCU | | Lupton Stadium • Fort Worth, TX | W 4–3 | Roberts (1–1) | Brassfield (3–3) | Hicks (4) | 12–21 | 4–9 |
| Apr 11 | at TCU | | Lupton Stadium • Fort Worth, TX | L 0–5 | Davis (3–3) | Bailey (3–2) | None | 12–22 | 4–10 |
| Apr 12 | at TCU | | Lupton Stadium • Fort Worth, TX | W 3–2 | McKinney (2–5) | Sagouspe (2–2) | Hicks (5) | 13–22 | 5–10 |
| Apr 13 | at #23 Arizona State | | Phoenix Municipal Stadium • Phoenix, AZ | W 5–3^{11} | Hicks (3–0) | Sagouspe (3–2) | None | 14–22 | |
| Apr 17 | Kansas State | | Hi Corbett Field • Tucson, AZ | L 1–2 | Smith (2–2) | Hicks (3–1) | None | 14–23 | 5–11 |
| Apr 18 | Kansas State | | Hi Corbett Field • Tucson, AZ | L 1–11^{8} | Sheffield (6–1) | Morris (1–2) | None | 14–24 | 5–12 |
| Apr 19 | Kansas State | | Hi Corbett Field • Tucson, AZ | W 11–7 | McKinney (3–5) | Fortenberry (1–1) | Hicks (6) | 15–24 | 6–12 |
| Apr 23 | BYU | | Hi Corbett Field • Tucson, AZ | W 6–0 | Fladda (3–1) | Crane (1–3) | None | 16–24 | 7–12 |
| Apr 24 | BYU | | Hi Corbett Field • Tucson, AZ | L 1–5 | Sumner (3–2) | Kramkowski (1–5) | None | 16–25 | 7–13 |
| Apr 25 | BYU | | Hi Corbett Field • Tucson, AZ | L 4–8 | Gray (7–5) | Bailey (3–3) | Johnson (4) | 16–26 | 7–14 |
| Apr 28 | at Grand Canyon | | Brazell Field • Phoenix, AZ | L 8–9 | Penzkove (1–0) | Hicks (3–2) | None | 16–27 | |
| May 1 | at #11 Kansas | | Hoglund Ballpark • Lawrence, KS | L 2–4 | Voegele (5–2) | Kramkowski (1–6) | None | 16–28 | 7–15 |
| May 2 | at #11 Kansas | | Hoglund Ballpark • Lawrence, KS | L 2–7 | Cook (4–1) | Bailey (3–4) | None | 16–29 | 7–16 |
| May 3 | at #11 Kansas | | Hoglund Ballpark • Lawrence, KS | L 5–11 | Scheidt (4–1) | Fladda (3–2) | None | 16–30 | 7–17 |
| May 6 | New Mexico State | | Hi Corbett Field • Tucson, AZ | W 8–6 | Martinez (1–1) | Barnes (0–3) | McKinney (1) | 17–30 | |
| May 8 | Houston | | Hi Corbett Field • Tucson, AZ | L 4–7 | Hoffman (3–6) | Kramkowski (1–7) | Rodriguez (4) | 17–31 | 7–18 |
| May 9 | Houston | | Hi Corbett Field • Tucson, AZ | L 5–7^{13} | Rodriguez (2–1) | McKinney (3–6) | None | 17–32 | 7–19 |
| May 10 | Houston | | Hi Corbett Field • Tucson, AZ | W 6–5 | Morris (2–2) | Kimble (0–1) | None | 18–32 | 8–19 |
| May 14 | at #21 Oklahoma State | | O'Brate Stadium • Stillwater, OK | W 7–4 | Kling (2–1) | Pesca (5–4) | None | 19–32 | 9–19 |
| May 15 | at #21 Oklahoma State | | O'Brate Stadium • Stillwater, OK | L 1–13^{7} | Lund (5–1) | Kramkowski (1–8) | None | 19–33 | 9–20 |
| May 16 | at #21 Oklahoma State | | O'Brate Stadium • Stillwater, OK | L 5–7 | Rhodes (4–2) | McKinney (3–7) | Pesca (2) | 19–34 | 9–21 |

== Rankings ==
Ranking movements Legend: ██ Increase in ranking ██ Decrease in ranking — = Not ranked
| | Week | | | | | | | | | | | | | | | | |
| Poll | Pre | 1 | 2 | 3 | 4 | 5 | 6 | 7 | 8 | 9 | 10 | 11 | 12 | 13 | 14 | 15 | Final |
|---|---|---|---|---|---|---|---|---|---|---|---|---|---|---|---|---|---|
| Coaches' | 24 | 24* | — | — | — | — | — | — | — | — | — | — | — | — | — | — | |
| Baseball America | — | — | — | — | — | — | — | — | — | — | — | — | — | — | — | — | |
| NCBWA† | 23 | — | — | — | — | — | — | — | — | — | — | — | — | — | — | — | |
| D1Baseball | 24 | — | — | — | — | — | — | — | — | — | — | — | — | — | — | — | |
| Perfect Game | — | — | — | — | — | — | — | — | — | — | — | — | — | — | — | — | |

† NCBWA ranks 30 teams in their preseason poll, but only ranks 25 teams weekly during the season.
* A new poll was not released for this week, so for comparison purposes, the previous week's ranking is inserted in this week's slot.

== 2026 MLB draft ==
| Player | Position | Round | Overall | MLB team |
|---|---|---|---|---|
| Owen Kramkowski | RHP | 5 | 145 | Tampa Bay Rays |
| Collin McKinney | RHP | 9 | 260 | Baltimore Orioles |
