= Randy Mazey =

American college baseball coach (born 1966)

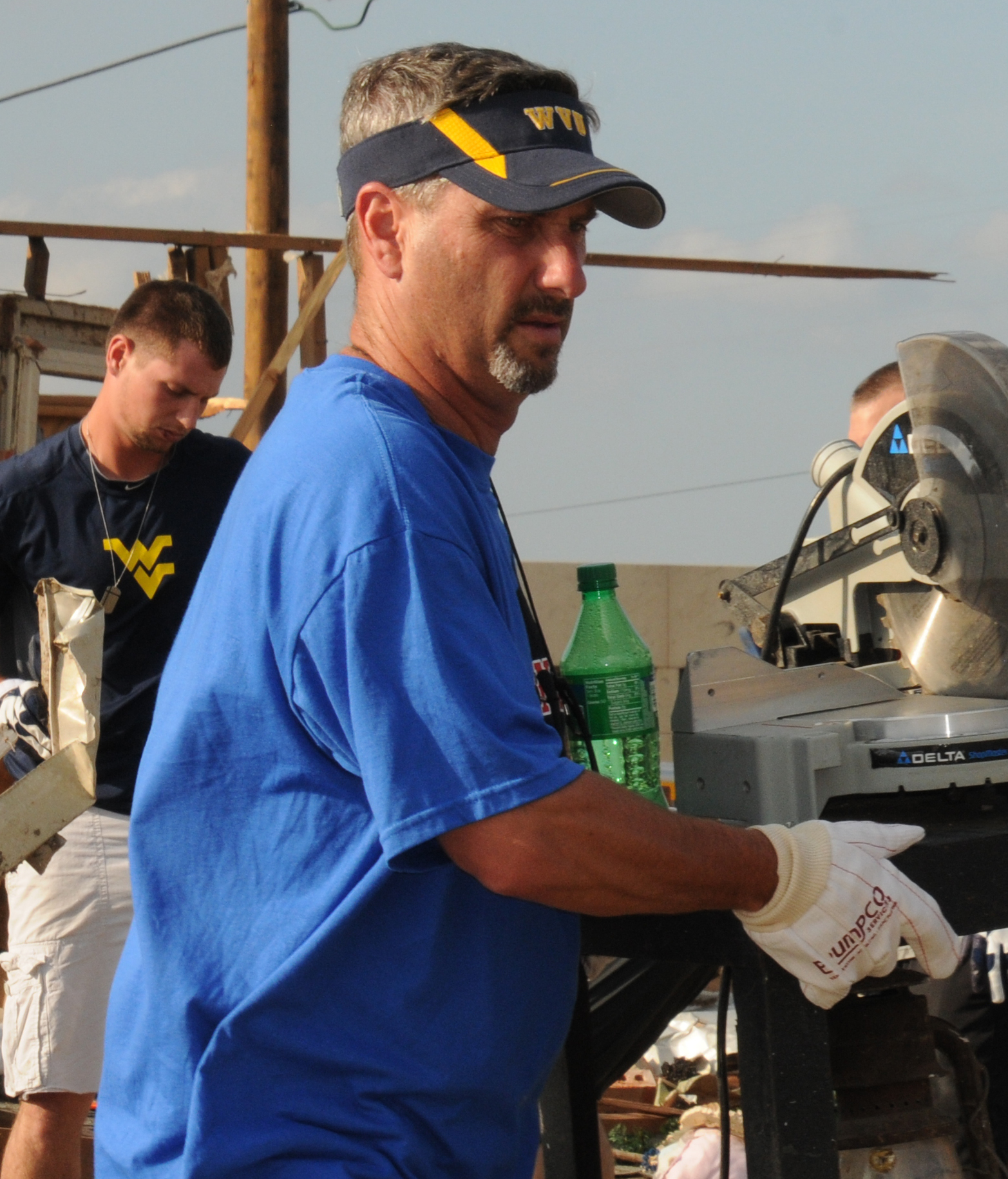
- Mazey in 2013

Biographical details
- Born: May 23, 1966 (age 60); Johnstown, Pennsylvania, U.S.

Playing career
- 1985–1988: Clemson
- 1988: Burlington Indians
- 1989: Miami Miracle
- Positions: Pitcher, outfielder

Coaching career (HC unless noted)
- 1990–1993: Clemson (assistant)
- 1994–1996: Charleston Southern
- 1997: Georgia (assistant)
- 1998: East Carolina (assistant)
- 1999–2002: Tennessee (assistant)
- 2003–2005: East Carolina
- 2006–2012: TCU (assistant)
- 2013–2024: West Virginia

Head coaching record
- Overall: 558–434–2 (.562)
- Tournaments: NCAA: 11–16; C-USA: 4–6; Big 12: 15–20

Accomplishments and honors

Championships
- As head coach: 1 Big South regular season (1996); 1 C-USA regular season (2004); 1 Big 12 regular season (2023); 2x NCAA Regional: (2004, 2024); As assistant coach: 5x NCAA Regional: (1991, 2001, 2009, 2010, 2012); 2x NCAA Super Regional: (2001, 2010); 1 ACC Tournament (1991); 1 ACC regular season (1991); 4x MWC Tournament (2006, 2007, 2008, 2010); 7x MWC regular season (2006, 2007, 2008, 2009, 2010, 2011, 2012)

Awards
- Big South Coach of the Year (1996); C-USA Coach of the Year (2004); 2× Big 12 Coach of the Year (2019, 2023); 4x ABCA East Region Coach of the Year (2004, 2017, 2019, 2024)

Randy Mazey (born May 23, 1966) is a former American college baseball coach. He was most recently the head baseball coach at West Virginia University, a position he had held from 2013 until 2024. Mazey attended Clemson University, where he played baseball for the Tigers from 1985 to 1988. Following a brief professional playing career, Mazey began his coaching career in 1990 as an assistant at Clemson. He was the head coach of Charleston Southern from 1994 to 1996 and East Carolina from 2003 to 2005, leading both teams to NCAA Division I Tournament appearances, Additionally, he was named the ABCA East Region Coach of the Year in 2004. After seven years as an assistant at TCU, Mazey was named the head coach at West Virginia in July 2012. Mazey was named the Big 12 Conference Baseball Coach of the Year in 2019 and 2023. While also again being named ABCA East Region Coach of the Year in 2017, 2019 and 2024.

== Playing career ==
Mazey was drafted by Cleveland in the 28th round of the 1988 draft. He played two seasons in the minors.

== Coaching career ==
Returning to Clemson, Mazey was assistant coach from 1990 to 1993, including a trip to the 1991 College World Series.

=== West Virginia Mountaineers ===
Mazey was hired as the head baseball coach at West Virginia University on June 6, 2012. This was not long after reports had surfaced that West Virginia might disband the team when they transitioned to the Big 12 conference.

The Mountaineers faced moderate success with Mazey. In 2023, they ended the season with a 40-20 record, becoming the Big 12 Regular Season Champion. They played in the 2023 Lexington Regional, but were eliminated by the Kentucky Wildcats in double elimination. On July 18, 2023, Mazey announced his intention to retire at the end of the 2024 season.

West Virginia finished the 2024 season with a 36–24 overall record, reaching the NCAA Tournament for the second consecutive season, winning the Tucson Regional but being eliminated by North Carolina in the Chapel Hill Super Regional. Following this elimination, on June 8, 2024, Mazey retired.

== Head coaching record ==
Below is a table of Mazey's yearly records as a head baseball coach.

Record table
Season	Team	Overall	Conference	Standing	Postseason
Charleston Southern Buccaneers (Big South Conference) (1994–1996)
1994	Charleston Southern	19–34	14–13	5th	
1995	Charleston Southern	17–36	8–16	7th	
1996	Charleston Southern	30–24–1	17–4	1st	NCAA regional
Charleston Southern:		66–94–1 (.413)	39–33 (.542)		
East Carolina Pirates (Conference USA) (2003–2005)
2003	East Carolina	34–27–1	17–13	5th	NCAA regional
2004	East Carolina	51–13	25–5	1st	NCAA Super Regional
2005	East Carolina	35–26	18–12	4th	NCAA regional
East Carolina:		120–66–1 (.644)	60–30 (.667)		
West Virginia Mountaineers (Big 12 Conference) (2013–2024)
2013	West Virginia	33–26	13–11	t-3rd	
2014	West Virginia	28–26	9–14	6th	
2015	West Virginia	27–27	9–13	7th	
2016	West Virginia	36–22	12–11	4th	
2017	West Virginia	36–26	12–12	t-4th	NCAA regional
2018	West Virginia	29–27	9–15	7th	
2019	West Virginia	38–22	13–11	4th	NCAA regional
2020	West Virginia	11–5	0–0		Season canceled due to COVID-19
2021	West Virginia	25–27	8–16	t-8th	
2022	West Virginia	33–22	14–10	t-5th	
2023	West Virginia	40–20	15–9	t-1st	NCAA regional
2024	West Virginia	36–24	19–11	4th	NCAA Super Regional
West Virginia:		372–274 (.576)	133–133 (.500)		
Total:		558–434–2 (.562)			
National champion Postseason invitational champion Conference regular season champion Conference regular season and conference tournament champion Division regular season champion Division regular season and conference tournament champion Conference tournament champion
