= 2026 Michigan Wolverines baseball team =

College baseball team season

2026 Michigan Wolverines baseball
- Conference: Big Ten Conference
- Record: 34–24 (17–13 Big Ten)
- Head coach: Tracy Smith (4th season)
- Assistant coaches: Jake Valentine (3rd season); Andrew Stone (1st season)
- Pitching coach: Brock Huntzinger (4th season)
- Home stadium: Wilpon Baseball Complex

2026 Big Ten Conference baseball standings
	Conf.						Overall
Team	W		L		T	PCT	W		L		T	PCT
No. 1 UCLA ‍†‍‡‍^{y}	28	–	2	–	0	.933	48	–	6	–	0	.889
No. 20 Nebraska ‍‍‍^{y}	23	–	7	–	0	.767	41	–	14	–	0	.745
No. 15 Oregon ‍‍‍^{y}	20	–	10	–	0	.667	38	–	15	–	0	.717
USC ‍‍‍^{y}	20	–	10	–	0	.667	42	–	14	–	0	.750
Purdue ‍‍‍	18	–	13	–	0	.581	36	–	18	–	0	.667
Ohio State ‍‍‍	18	–	12	–	0	.600	29	–	24	–	0	.547
Michigan ‍‍‍	17	–	13	–	0	.567	33	–	22	–	0	.600
Iowa ‍‍‍	15	–	15	–	0	.500	30	–	21	–	0	.588
Illinois ‍‍‍	14	–	16	–	0	.467	27	–	27	–	0	.500
Rutgers ‍‍‍	13	–	17	–	0	.433	26	–	29	–	0	.473
Washington ‍‍‍	12	–	18	–	0	.400	23	–	31	–	0	.426
Michigan State ‍‍‍	12	–	19	–	0	.387	22	–	31	–	0	.415
Minnesota ‍‍‍	11	–	19	–	0	.367	30	–	23	–	0	.566
Maryland ‍‍‍	9	–	21	–	0	.300	27	–	29	–	0	.482
Indiana ‍‍‍	9	–	21	–	0	.300	23	–	31	–	0	.426
Penn State ‍‍‍	9	–	21	–	0	.300	16	–	35	–	0	.314
Northwestern ‍‍‍	8	–	22	–	0	.267	21	–	30	–	1	.413
† – Conference champion ‡ – Tournament champion y – Invited to the NCAA tournament As of May 19, 2026; Rankings from D1Baseball

The 2026 Michigan Wolverines baseball team represents the University of Michigan in the 2026 NCAA Division I baseball season. The Wolverines are led by head coach Tracy Smith in his fourth season, are a member of the Big Ten Conference and play their home games at Wilpon Baseball Complex in Ann Arbor, Michigan.

== Previous season ==
The Wolverines finished the 2025 season 33–23, including 16–14 in conference play, finishing tied for sixth place in their conference. Following the conclusion of the regular season, the Wolverines qualified for the 2025 Big Ten baseball tournament, where they finished 0–2 in pool play and did not receive a bid to the 2025 NCAA Division I baseball tournament.

== Roster ==
2026 Michigan Wolverines baseball team
Players
Coaches

#	Pos.	Name	B/T	Height	Weight	Year	Previous school	Home town
0	OF	Evan Haeger	L/L	6 ft 1 in (1.85 m)	200 lb (91 kg)	RS So	Houston	New Hudson, Michigan
2	INF	Brayden Jefferis	L/R	5 ft 10 in (1.78 m)	175 lb (79 kg)	So	Hart	Valencia, California
3	OF	Greg Pace Jr.	R/R	6 ft 3 in (1.91 m)	207 lb (94 kg)	RS Jr	Edison Academy	Southfield, Michigan
4	C	Noah Miller	R/R	6 ft 0 in (1.83 m)	200 lb (91 kg)	RS So	Monroe	Monroe, Michigan
5	RHP	David Lally Jr.	R/R	6 ft 5 in (1.96 m)	215 lb (98 kg)	Sr	Notre Dame	Grand Blanc, Michigan
6	RHP	Kurt Barr	R/R	6 ft 3 in (1.91 m)	190 lb (86 kg)	Sr	University Liggett	Saint Joachim, Ontario
7	INF	Joe Longo	R/R	6 ft 0 in (1.83 m)	215 lb (98 kg)	Gr	Holy Angels	Apple Valley, Minnesota
8	INF	Drew Culbertson	R/R	5 ft 10 in (1.78 m)	175 lb (79 kg)	Jr	Oklahoma State	Greenwood, Indiana
9	RHP	Cade Montgomery	R/R	5 ft 11 in (1.8 m)	180 lb (82 kg)	Jr	Utah Tech	Kaysville, Utah
10	RHP	Tate Carey	R/R	6 ft 0 in (1.83 m)	209 lb (95 kg)	So	Riverside Secondary School	Windsor, Ontario
12	RHP	Max Debiec	R/R	6 ft 7 in (2.01 m)	218 lb (99 kg)	Sr	Folsom Lake College	Seattle, Washington
14	INF	Colby Turner	R/R	6 ft 0 in (1.83 m)	205 lb (93 kg)	Jr	San Diego State	Huntington Beach, California
15	INF	Carson Luna	R/R	6 ft 1 in (1.85 m)	187 lb (85 kg)	RS Fr	Texas	Houston, Texas
17	RHP	Gavin DeVooght	R/R	6 ft 5 in (1.96 m)	238 lb (108 kg)	Jr	Ohio State	Walled Lake, Michigan
18	OF	Brendan Stressler	L/L	6 ft 2 in (1.88 m)	200 lb (91 kg)	So	Saint Louis	Chicago, Illinois
19	RHP	Brandon Mann	R/R	6 ft 3 in (1.91 m)	247 lb (112 kg)	Sr	Detroit Country Day	Franklin, Michigan
20	INF	Dane Morrow	L/R	6 ft 0 in (1.83 m)	185 lb (84 kg)	RS Fr	Tennessee	Louisville, Kentucky
21	OF	Jonathan Kim	L/L	5 ft 11 in (1.8 m)	190 lb (86 kg)	Sr	Brookfield Academy	Brookfield, Wisconsin
22	LHP	Wyatt Novara	L/L	6 ft 3 in (1.91 m)	200 lb (91 kg)	Jr	Dexter	Dexter, Michigan
23	RHP	Preston Barr	R/R	6 ft 3 in (1.91 m)	210 lb (95 kg)	Fr	University Liggett	Grosse Pointe Woods, Michigan
24	C	Elie Kligman	S/R	6 ft 0 in (1.83 m)	205 lb (93 kg)	Gr	Sacramento State	Las Vegas, Nevada
25	C	Brock Leitgeb	R/R	6 ft 0 in (1.83 m)	200 lb (91 kg)	RS So	Jesuit	Portland, Oregon
26	RHP	Tyler Finkbeiner	R/R	6 ft 7 in (2.01 m)	240 lb (109 kg)	Fr	Anchor Bay	New Baltimore, Michigan
27	INF	Jack Laffitte	R/R	6 ft 2 in (1.88 m)	195 lb (88 kg)	Fr	Harvard-Westlake	Pacific Palisades, California
28	INF	Cade Ladehoff	R/R	5 ft 10 in (1.78 m)	200 lb (91 kg)	RS So	NJIT	Bradenton, Florida
29	OF	Keegan O'Hearn	L/L	6 ft 5 in (1.96 m)	225 lb (102 kg)	RS So	O'Neill CVI	Oshawa, Ontario
30	LHP	Shane Brinham	L/L	6 ft 1 in (1.85 m)	180 lb (82 kg)	Fr	Handsworth	North Vancouver, British Columbia
32	LHP	John Hughes	L/L	6 ft 2 in (1.88 m)	215 lb (98 kg)	RS Fr	North Carolina	Hinsdale, Illinois
34	LHP	Michael Quedens	L/L	6 ft 1 in (1.85 m)	192 lb (87 kg)	So	St. Mary's	Stockton, California
35	INF	Matt Ossenfort	L/L	6 ft 3 in (1.91 m)	215 lb (98 kg)	Jr	NC State	Sioux Falls, South Dakota
36	OF	Josh Campbell	R/R	5 ft 10 in (1.78 m)	190 lb (86 kg)	RS Fr	IMG Academy	Bloomfield Hills, Michigan
37	RHP	Josh Kasner	R/R	6 ft 1 in (1.85 m)	200 lb (91 kg)	So	Algonac	Algonac, Michigan
38	LHP	Slade Moore	R/L	6 ft 1 in (1.85 m)	175 lb (79 kg)	RS Fr	West Bloomfield High School	West Bloomfield, Michigan
39	RHP	Caleb Raymond	R/R	6 ft 2 in (1.88 m)	185 lb (84 kg)	Fr	Skyline	Ann Arbor, Michigan
40	INF	Cooper Mullens	R/R	5 ft 7 in (1.7 m)	155 lb (70 kg)	RS So	Marist Catholic	Eugene, Oregon
41	RHP	Grant Bradley	R/R	6 ft 3 in (1.91 m)	205 lb (93 kg)	So	Napoleon	Brooklyn, Michigan
42	RHP	Justin Brown	R/R	6 ft 3 in (1.91 m)	198 lb (90 kg)	RS Fr	Northville	Northville, Michigan
45	RHP	Wyatt Rudden	R/R	6 ft 0 in (1.83 m)	180 lb (82 kg)	Fr	Cherry Creek	Greenwood Village, Colorado
47	LHP	Brennan Hill	L/L	6 ft 4 in (1.93 m)	201 lb (91 kg)	RS Fr	Grosse Pointe North	Grosse Pointe Woods, Michigan
49	RHP	Erik Puodziunas	R/R	6 ft 3 in (1.91 m)	190 lb (86 kg)	RS Fr	Notre Dame	Sherman Oaks, California
50	INF	Will Twomey	R/R	6 ft 4 in (1.93 m)	210 lb (95 kg)	Fr	Georgetown Prep	Washington, D. C.
51	INF	Joonsung Park	R/R	6 ft 0 in (1.83 m)	193 lb (88 kg)	Jr	IMG Academy	Seoul, South Korea

Head coach

Tracy Smith

Assistant coach(es)

Jake Valentine
Andrew Stone

Pitching coach(es)

Brock Huntzinger

Legend

- (C) Team captain
- (S) Suspended
- (I) Ineligible
- Injured
- Current redshirt

Roster
Last update: October 16, 2025

== Schedule and results ==
2026 Michigan Wolverines baseball game log (34–23)
Regular season (32–22)

February (5–4)
#	Date	Opponent	Rank	Site/stadium	Score	Win	Loss	Save	Attendance	Overall Record	B1G Record
1	February 13	vs. No. 12 Oregon State; College Baseball Series		Surprise Stadium; Surprise, AZ	5–3	**Brinham** (1–0)	Yeager (0–1)	**DeVooght** (1)	5,683	1–0	–
2	February 14	Stanford; College Baseball Series		Surprise Stadium	7–6	**Montgomery** (1–0)	Keenan (0–1)	**DeVooght** (2)	6,294	2–0	–
3	February 15	vs. No. 24 Arizona; College Baseball Series		Surprise Stadium	4–1	**K. Barr** (1–0)	McKinney (0–1)	**Brinham** (1)	6,027	3–0	–
4	February 16	vs. No. 11 Oregon State; College Baseball Series		Surprise Stadium	4–5^{(10)}	Giordano (1–0)	**P. Barr** (0–1)	None	3,273	3–1	–
5	February 20	vs. No. 16 Florida State; College Baseball Series		Globe Life Field; Arlington, TX	1–6	Mendes (2–0)	**Carey** (0–1)	None	0	3–2	–
6	February 21	vs. No. 15 Louisville; College Baseball Series		Globe Life Field	8–5	**Montgomery** (2–0)	Bean (0–2)	**DeVooght** (3)	0	4–2	–
7	February 22	vs. Kansas State; College Baseball Series		Globe Life Field	6–10	Sheffield (2–0)	**K. Barr** (1–1)	Feser (1)	3,374	4–3	–
8	February 27	at San Diego		Fowler Park; San Diego, CA	5–6^{(10)}	Cody (1–0)	**Devooght** (0–1)	None	1,207	4–4	–
9	February 28	at San Diego		Fowler Park	9–0	**Carey** (1–1)	Bade (1–1)	Bradley (1)	1,080	5–4	–

March (9–9)
#	Date	Opponent	Rank	Site/stadium	Score	Win	Loss	Save	Attendance	Overall Record	B1G Record
10	March 1	at San Diego		Fowler Park	9–2	**Finkbeiner** (1–0)	Frize (1–2)	**Devooght** (4)	1,059	6–4	–
11	March 3	at Cal State Northridge		Matador Field; Northridge, CA	8–9^{(12)}	Banuelos (1–0)	**Brinham** (1–1)	None	388	6–5	–
12	March 5	at Pepperdine		Eddy D. Field Stadium; Malibu, CA	17–4	**Quedens** (1–0)	Fowler (0–2)	None	0	7–5	–
13	March 6	at Pepperdine		Eddy D. Field Stadium	8–9	Wechsberg (2–0)	**Finkbeiner** (1–1)	None	399	7–6	–
14	March 7	at Pepperdine		Eddy D. Field Stadium	5–2	**K. Barr** (2–1)	Valentine (0–2)	**Lally Jr.** (1)	503	8–6	–
15	March 10	Western Michigan		Ray Fisher Stadium; Ann Arbor, MI	3–2	**Moore** (1–0)	Maloney (0–1)	**DeVooght** (5)	796	9–6	–
16	March 13	at No. 1 UCLA		Jackie Robinson Stadium; Los Angeles, CA	5–10	Reddemann (5–0)	**Montgomery** (2–1)	None	1,073	9–7	0–1
17	March 14	at No. 1 UCLA		Jackie Robinson Stadium	0–2	Barnett (4–0)	**K. Barr** (2–2)	Hawk (1)	1,187	9–8	0–2
18	March 15	at No. 1 UCLA		Jackie Robinson Stadium	2–7	Stump (1–0)	**Brinham** (1–1)	None	1,410	9–9	0–3
19	March 18	Michigan State		Ray Fisher Stadium	2–0	**Bradley** (1–0)	Crane (1–1)	**DeVooght** (6)	702	10–9	–
20	March 20	Nebraska		Ray Fisher Stadium	2–1	**K. Barr** (3–2)	Horn (0–1)	**Debiec** (1)	808	11–9	1–3
21	March 21	Nebraska		Ray Fisher Stadium	0–10^{(7)}	Jasa (4–1)	**Lally Jr.** (0–1)	None	1,207	11–10	1–4
22	March 22	Nebraska		Ray Fisher Stadium	5–9	Unger (4–1)	**DeVooght** (0–2)	None	848	11–11	1–5
23	March 24	Oakland		Ray Fisher Stadium	6–7	Ruhle (1–0)	**Debiec** (0–1)	Donley (1)	343	11–12	–
24	March 25	Toledo		Ray Fisher Stadium	5–2	**Bradley** (2–0)	Hughes (1–3)	**DeVooght** (7)	358	12–12	–
25	March 27	at Rutgers		Bainton Field; Piscataway, NJ	3–4	Gleason (1–0)	**Brinham** (1–3)	Mazza (1)	339	12–13	1–6
26	March 28	at Rutgers		Bainton Field	11–5	**Puodziunas** (1–0)	Borghese (1–2)	Montgomery (1)	400	13–13	2–6
27	March 29	at Rutgers		Bainton Field	6–2	**Lally Jr.** (1–1)	Sand (2–2)	None	505	14–13	3–6

April (13–4)
#	Date	Opponent	Rank	Site/stadium	Score	Win	Loss	Save	Attendance	Overall Record	B1G Record
28	April 2	No. 15 Oregon		Ray Fisher Stadium	10–0^{(7)}	**Brinham** (2–3)	Sanford (4–1)	None	639	15–13	4–6
29	April 3	No. 15 Oregon		Ray Fisher Stadium	2–5	Clarke (5–2)	**DeVooght** (0–3)	Bell (7)	1,564	15–14	4–7
30	April 4	No. 15 Oregon		Ray Fisher Stadium	4–3	**Montgomery** (3–1)	Bell (1–3)	None	1,156	16–14	5–7
31	April 6	at Eastern Michigan		Oestrike Stadium; Ypsilanti, MI	15–4^{(7)}	**Novara** (1–0)	Kennedy (1–1)	None	207	17–14	–
32	April 7	Central Michigan		Ray Fisher Stadium	6–4	**Mann** (1–0)	Hammond (0–3)	None	344	18–14	–
33	April 10	at Michigan State		McLane Stadium; East Lansing, MI	4–2	**K. Barr** (4–2)	Chambers (2–2)	None	1,118	19–14	6–7
34	April 11	at Michigan State		McLane Stadium	6–4	**Brinham** (3–3)	Monke (3–3)	**Montgomery** (2)	0	20–14	7–7
35	April 12	at Michigan State		McLane Stadium	5–10	Pikur (1–3)	**Lally Jr.** (1–2)	None	0	20–15	7–8
36	April 14	at Toledo		Scott Park Baseball Complex; Toledo, OH	6–4	**DeVooght** (1–3)	Curry (0–3)	**Montgomery** (3)	1,433	21–15	–
–	April 15	Eastern Michigan		Ray Fisher Stadium	**Cancelled**						
37	April 17	Northwestern		Ray Fisher Stadium	7–6	**K. Barr** (5–2)	Rifenburg (2–4)	**DeVooght** (8)	1,154	22–15	8–8
38	April 18	Northwestern		Ray Fisher Stadium	8–3	**Brinham** (4–3)	Kouser (1–4)	None	1,104	23–15	9–8
39	April 19	Northwestern		Ray Fisher Stadium	2–1	**Lally Jr.** (2–2)	Weaver (1–4)	None	1,051	24–15	10–8
–	April 21	Dayton		Ray Fisher Stadium	**Cancelled**						
40	March 31	at Miami (OH)		Hayden Park; Oxford, OH	10–12	Byers (4–1)	**Debiec** (0–2)	None	1,643	24–16	–
41	April 22	Bowling Green		Ray Fisher Stadium	9–6	**P. Barr** (1–1)	Krouse (1–1)	**DeVooght** (9)	667	25–16	–
42	April 24	Washington		Ray Fisher Stadium	8–7	**Moore** (2–0)	Brandenburg (2–1)	None	972	26–16	11–8
43	April 25	Washington		Ray Fisher Stadium	4–3	**Quedens** (2–0)	Johnson (0–3)	None	1,062	27–16	12–8
44	April 26	Washington		Ray Fisher Stadium	5–7	Lewis (5–4)	**Lally Jr.** (2–3)	None	1,424	27–17	12–9

May (5–5)
#	Date	Opponent	Rank	Site/stadium	Score	Win	Loss	Save	Attendance	Overall Record	B1G Record
45	May 1	at Maryland		Bob "Turtle" Smith Stadium; College Park, MD	2–1	**DeVooght** (2–3)	Williams (2–4)	None	0	28–17	13–9
46	May 2	at Maryland		Bob "Turtle" Smith Stadium	17–5^{(7)}	**Brinham** (5–3)	Ryan (3–2)	None	0	29–17	14–9
47	May 3	at Maryland		Bob "Turtle" Smith Stadium	8–7	**Puodziunas** (2–0)	Koshy (2–1)	**Montgomery** (4)	0	30–17	15–9
–	May 5	at Xavier		J. Page Hayden Field; Cincinnati, OH	**Canceled**						
48	May 8	at Minnesota		Siebert Field; Minneapolis, MN	1–13(7)	Urban (2-0)	**Barr** (5-3)	None	0	30–18	15–10
49	May 9	at Minnesota		Siebert Field	9–8	**Moore** (3-0)	Jaenke (2-3)	**Montgomery** (5)	0	31–18	16–10
50	May 10	at Minnesota		Siebert Field	8–5	**Quedens** (3-0)	Selvig (5-4)	**Montgomery (6)**	0	32–18	17–10
–	May 12	Ohio		Ray Fisher Stadium	**Cancelled**						
51	May 12	at Kent State		Schoonover Stadium; Kent, OH	3–5	Kolenda (3-0)	**Lally Jr.** (2-4)	Williams (5)	0	32–19	–
52	May 14	Ohio State		Ray Fisher Stadium	2–13(7)	Herrenbruck (6-3)	**Barr** (5-4)	None	0	32–20	17–11
53	May 15	Ohio State		Ray Fisher Stadium	3–7	Kuzniewski (6-2)	**Brinham** (5-4)	Carrell (1)	0	32–21	17–12
54	May 16	Ohio State		Ray Fisher Stadium	1–8	Domke (6-6)	**Quedens** (3-1)	None	2,142	32–22	17–13

Postseason (2–1)

B1G Tournament (2–1)
#	Date	Opponent	Rank	Stadium Site	Score	Win	Loss	Save	Attendance	Overall Record	B1GT Record
55	May 19	(10) Rutgers (Opening Round)	(7)	Charles Schwab Field Omaha; Omaha, Neb	10–0(7)	**Montgomery** (4-1)	Vincent (4-5)	None	0	33–22	1–0
56	May 20	(11) Washington (Qualification Round)	(7)	Charles Schwab Field Omaha	–					–	–

- Win
- Loss
- Postponement
- Bold: Wolverines team member
- Rankings from D1Baseball.com.
- (#) Tournament seedings in parentheses.

== Rankings ==
Ranking movements Legend: ██ Increase in ranking ██ Decrease in ranking — = Not ranked RV = Received votes
	Week																
Poll	Pre	1	2	3	4	5	6	7	8	9	10	11	12	13	14	15	Final
Coaches'	—	—*	RV	RV	—	—	—	—	—	—	—	—	RV	—	—	—	
Baseball America	—	—	—	—	—	—	—	—	—	—	—	—	—	—	—	—*	
NCBWA†	—	RV	RV	RV	—	—	—	—	RV	RV	RV	RV	RV	RV	RV	RV*	
D1Baseball	—	—	—	—	—	—	—	—	—	—	—	—	—	—	—	—	
Perfect Game	—	—	—	—	—	—	—	—	—	—	—	—	—	—	—	—*	

† NCBWA ranks 30 teams in their preseason poll, but only ranks 25 teams weekly during the season.
* A new poll was not released for this week, so for comparison purposes, the previous week's ranking is inserted in this week's slot.
