= Dan Fitzgerald (baseball) =

American baseball player and coach

Current position
- Title: Head coach
- Team: Kansas
- Conference: Big 12
- Record: 144–90 (.615)

Biographical details
- Born: 1977 or 1978 (age 48–49); Edina, Minnesota, U.S.

Playing career
- 1997–1998: St. Thomas (MN)
- 1999: Wisconsin-River Falls

Coaching career (HC unless noted)
- 2001: Iowa (asst.)
- 2003–2004: North Iowa Area CC (asst.)
- 2005–2006: Flagler (asst.)
- 2007: Des Moines Area CC (asst.)
- 2008–2012: Des Moines Area CC
- 2013–2016: Dallas Baptist (asst./RC)
- 2017–2021: Dallas Baptist (AHC/RC)
- 2022: LSU (asst./RC)
- 2023–present: Kansas

Head coaching record
- Overall: 249–101 (.711) (NJCAA); 144–88 (.615) (NCAA)
- Tournaments: Big 12: 6–4; NCAA: 4–4

Accomplishments and honors

Championships
- 5× ICCAC Regular Season (2008–12); 4× ICCAC Conference Tournament (2008–09,11–12); Big 12 Regular Season (2026); NCAA Regional (2026)

Awards
- 2× Big 12 Coach of the Year (2025, 2026)

Daniel Fitzgerald (born 1977 or 1978) is an American baseball coach and former player, who is the current head baseball coach of the Kansas Jayhawks. He played college baseball for the St. Thomas Tommies and the Wisconsin-River Falls Falcons He served as the head coach of the Des Moines Area Bears (2008–2012).

== Early life and education ==
Fitzgerald grew up in Edina, Minnesota, where he attended Edina High School. He attended the University of St. Thomas (Minnesota) and played for the Tommies. He is also the uncle of Jack Fitzgerald.

== Coaching career ==
Fitzgerald began his coaching career as a volunteer assistant for the Iowa Hawkeyes in 2000. He then moved to North Iowa Area Community College where he was an assistant, while also holding the roles of housing head resident and intramural coordinator for the 2003 and 2004 seasons. He was an assistant on Dave Barnett's staff for the Flagler Saints in 2005 and 2006. He would spend the 2007 season as an assistant coach for the Des Moines Area Bears, before being promoted to head coach starting with the 2008 season. He led the Bears to a 249–73 record and to the JUCO World Series in 4 of 5 seasons (2008–2012) as the head coach.

Fitgerald joined Dan Heefner's staff as an assistant coach and recruiting coordinator of the Dallas Baptist in 2012. Prior to the 2017 season, he was promoted to associate head coach. After 9 years on Heefner's staff, he accepted the recruiting coordinator position with the LSU Tigers.

On June 15, 2022, Fitzgerald was named the 19th head coach of the Kansas Jayhawks.

== Head coaching record ==
Record table
Season	Team	Overall	Conference	Standing	Postseason
DMACC Bears (ICCAC) (2008–2012)
2008	DMACC	48-18	17–7	1st	NJCAA National World Series Qualifier
2009	DMACC	55-11	20-4	1st	NJCAA National World Series Qualifier
2010	DMACC	47–11	20-4	1st	NJCAA Regional Qualifier
2011	DMACC	48-18	17-7	1st	NJCAA National Runner Up
2012	DMACC	51-15	22-2	1st	NJCAA National Quarter-Finals
DMACC:		249–73	96-24		
Kansas Jayhawks (Big 12 Conference) (2023–present)
2023	Kansas	25–32	8–16	8th	Big 12 tournament
2024	Kansas	31–23	15–15	T–6th	Big 12 tournament
2025	Kansas	43–17	20–10	2nd	NCAA Fayetteville Regional
2026	Kansas	45–18	22–8	1st	NCAA Lawrence Super Regional
Kansas:		144–90	65–49		
Total:		393–163 (.707)			
National champion Postseason invitational champion Conference regular season champion Conference regular season and conference tournament champion Division regular season champion Division regular season and conference tournament champion Conference tournament champion
