= 2025 Big 12 Conference baseball tournament =

American college baseball tournament

- Teams: 12
- Format: one bracket single-elimination tournament
- Finals site: Globe Life Field; Arlington, Texas
- Champions: Arizona (1st title)
- Winning coach: Chip Hale (1st title)
- MVP: Mason White (Arizona)
- Attendance: 15,415
- Television: Bracket Play: ESPN+, ESPN2, ESPNU; Championship: ESPNU

2025 Big 12 Conference baseball standings
| | Conf. | | | | Overall |
| Team | W | | L | PCT | W | | L | PCT |
|---|---|---|---|---|---|---|---|---|
| No. 14 West Virginia ‍†‍‍^{y} | 19 | – | 9 | .679 | 44 | – | 16 | .733 |
| Kansas ‍‍‍^{y} | 20 | – | 10 | .667 | 43 | – | 17 | .717 |
| TCU ‍‍‍^{y} | 19 | – | 11 | .633 | 39 | – | 20 | .661 |
| No. 7 Arizona ‍‍‡‍^{y} | 18 | – | 12 | .600 | 44 | – | 21 | .677 |
| Arizona State ‍‍‍^{y} | 18 | – | 12 | .600 | 36 | – | 24 | .600 |
| Kansas State ‍‍‍^{y} | 17 | – | 13 | .567 | 32 | – | 26 | .552 |
| Oklahoma State ‍‍‍^{y} | 15 | – | 12 | .556 | 30 | – | 25 | .545 |
| Cincinnati ‍‍‍^{y} | 16 | – | 14 | .533 | 33 | – | 26 | .559 |
| Texas Tech ‍‍‍ | 13 | – | 17 | .433 | 20 | – | 33 | .377 |
| Baylor ‍‍‍ | 13 | – | 17 | .433 | 33 | – | 22 | .600 |
| Houston ‍‍‍ | 12 | – | 17 | .414 | 30 | – | 25 | .545 |
| BYU ‍‍‍ | 10 | – | 20 | .333 | 28 | – | 27 | .509 |
| UCF ‍‍‍ | 9 | – | 21 | .300 | 29 | – | 26 | .527 |
| Utah ‍‍‍ | 8 | – | 22 | .267 | 21 | – | 29 | .420 |
† – Conference champion ‡ – Tournament champion y – Invited to the NCAA tournament As of June 23, 2025; Rankings from D1baseball

The 2025 Big 12 Conference baseball tournament was a postseason baseball tournament for the Big 12 Conference in the 2025 NCAA Division I baseball season. The tournament took place from May 21–24, 2025 and was held at Globe Life Field in Arlington, Texas. The 28th annual postseason Big 12 tournament, Arizona defeated TCU to earn the automatic berth to the 2025 NCAA Division I baseball tournament.

The tournament has been held since 1997, the inaugural year of the Big 12 Conference. Among current league members, Oklahoma State and TCU have won the most championships with four. Among original members, Kansas State has never won the event. Defending champion Oklahoma State won their fourth championship in 2024. Iowa State discontinued their program after the 2001 season without having won a title. This is the first season with Arizona, Arizona State and Utah since conference realignment, with Colorado not fielding a team.

== Format and seeding ==
The top twelve finishers from the regular season will be seeded one through twelve, and will then play a single-elimination tournament. This is a change from the previous season where the tournament was double elimination.

| Seed | School | Conf. | Over. | Tiebreaker |
|---|---|---|---|---|
| #1 | West Virginia | 19–9 | 40–13 | |
| #2 | Kansas | 20–10 | 42–14 | |
| #3 | TCU | 19–11 | 37–17 | |
| #4 | Arizona | 18–12 | 36–18 | 2–1 vs Arizona State |
| #5 | Arizona State | 18–12 | 35–21 | 1–2 vs Arizona |
| #6 | Kansas State | 17–13 | 31–23 | |
| #7 | Oklahoma State | 15–12 | 27–22 | |
| #8 | Cincinnati | 16–14 | 31–23 | |
| #9 | Texas Tech | 13–17 | 20–32 | 2–1 vs Baylor |
| #10 | Baylor | 13–17 | 33–21 | 1–2 vs Texas Tech |
| #11 | Houston | 12–17 | 29–24 | |
| #12 | BYU | 10–20 | 27–26 | |

† First Round Bye
UCF & Utah did not qualify for the tournament

== Bracket ==
First round Wednesday, May 21
8 | Cincinnati | 6
9 | Texas Tech | 5
5 | Arizona State | 0
12 | BYU | 2
7 | Oklahoma State | 4
10 | Baylor | 3
6 | Kansas State | 2
11 | Houston | 9

Quarterfinals; Thursday, May 22
1 | West Virginia | 10
8 | Cincinnati | 3
4 | Arizona | 4
12 | BYU | 1
2 | Kansas | 7
7 | Oklahoma State | 6
3 | TCU | 7
11 | Houston | 1

Semifinals; Friday, May 23
1 | West Virginia | 1
4 | Arizona | 12
2 | Kansas | 1
3 | TCU | 11

Championship; Saturday, May 24
4 | Arizona | 2^{(10)}
3 | TCU | 1

* denotes extra innings

== Schedule ==
| Game | Time | Matchup | Score | Box Score | Television | Attendance | Notes |
First round – Wednesday, May 21
| 1 | 9:00 a.m. | No. 5 Arizona State vs. No. 12 BYU | 0−2 | | ESPN+ | | Arizona State Eliminated |
| 2 | 12:30 p.m. | No. 8 Cincinnati vs. No. 9 Texas Tech | 6−5 | | ESPNU | | Texas Tech Eliminated |
| 3 | 4:00 p.m. | No. 7 Oklahoma State vs. No. 10 Baylor | 4−3 | | ESPNU | | Baylor Eliminated |
| 4 | 8:00 p.m. | No. 6 Kansas State vs. No. 11 Houston | 2−9 | | ESPN2 | | Kansas State Eliminated |
Quarterfinals – Thursday, May 22
| 5 | 9:00 a.m. | No. 4 Arizona vs. No. 12 BYU | 4−1 | | ESPN+ | 6,032 | BYU Eliminated |
| 6 | 12:30 p.m. | No. 1 West Virginia vs. No. 8 Cincinnati | 10−3 | | ESPN+ | 6,032 | Cincinnati Eliminated |
| 7 | 4:00 p.m. | No. 2 Kansas vs. No. 7 Oklahoma State | 7−6 | | ESPNU | 6,032 | Oklahoma State Eliminated |
| 8 | 7:30 p.m. | No. 3 TCU vs. No. 11 Houston | 7−1 | | ESPNU | 6,032 | Houston Eliminated |
Semifinals – Friday, May 23
| 9 | 4:00 p.m. | No. 4 Arizona vs. No. 1 West Virginia | 12−1 | | ESPN+ | 4,257 | West Virginia Eliminated |
| 10 | 7:30 p.m. | No. 2 Kansas vs. No. 3 TCU | 1−11 | | ESPN+ | 4,257 | Kansas Eliminated |
Championship – Saturday, May 23
| 11 | 6:00 p.m. | No. 4 Arizona vs. No. 3 TCU | 2−1^{(10)} | Box Score | ESPNU | 5,126 | TCU Eliminated |
Game times in CT. Rankings denote tournament seed.

== Conference Championship Game ==
Big 12 Championship
| (4)Arizona Wildcats | vs. | (3)TCU Horned Frogs |

May 29, 2022 6:03 p.m. (CDT) at Globe Life Field in Arlington, Texas
| Team | 1 | 2 | 3 | 4 | 5 | 6 | 7 | 8 | 9 | 10 | R | H | E |
|---|---|---|---|---|---|---|---|---|---|---|---|---|---|
| Arizona | 0 | 0 | 0 | 0 | 0 | 0 | 0 | 0 | 1 | 1 | 2 | 6 | 0 |
| TCU | 1 | 0 | 0 | 0 | 0 | 0 | 0 | 0 | 0 | 0 | 1 | 6 | 2 |
WP: Tony Pluta (2–0) LP: Braeden Sloan (3–4); Home runs: ARIZ: Andrew Cain (8); TCU: None; Attendance: 5,126

== All-tournament Team ==
The following players were members of the 2025 Big 12 Baseball All-Tournament Team. Player in Bold selected as Tournament MVP.

| Position | Player | School |
|---|---|---|
| C | Jack Natili | Cincinnati |
| 1B | Brady Ballinger | Kansas |
| 2B | Cole Cramer | TCU |
| 3B | Jack Bell | TCU |
| 3B | Maddox Mihalakis | Arizona |
| SS | **Mason White** (MVP) | **Arizona** |
| OF | Brendan Summerhill | Arizona |
| OF | Noah Franco | TCU |
| OF | Kyle West | West Virginia |
| DH | Sawyer Strosnider | TCU |
| SP | Tommy Lapour | TCU |
| SP | Griffin Kim | West Virginia |
| RP | Tony Pluta | Arizona |
