= 2025 Arizona Wildcats baseball team =

College baseball team in the 2025 NCAA Division I season

2025 Arizona Wildcats baseball

Chapel Hill Super Regional Champions Eugene Regional Champions Big 12 Tournament Champions

College World Series
- Conference: Big 12 Conference

Ranking
- D1Baseball.com: No. 7
- Record: 44–21 (18–12 Big 12)
- Head coach: Chip Hale (4th season)
- Assistant coaches: Trip Couch (4th season); Kevin Vance (2nd season); Toby Demello (4th season)
- Home stadium: Hi Corbett Field

2025 Big 12 Conference baseball standings
	Conf.				Overall
Team	W		L	PCT	W		L	PCT
No. 14 West Virginia ‍†‍‍^{y}	19	–	9	.679	44	–	16	.733
Kansas ‍‍‍^{y}	20	–	10	.667	43	–	17	.717
TCU ‍‍‍^{y}	19	–	11	.633	39	–	20	.661
No. 7 Arizona ‍‍‡‍^{y}	18	–	12	.600	44	–	21	.677
Arizona State ‍‍‍^{y}	18	–	12	.600	36	–	24	.600
Kansas State ‍‍‍^{y}	17	–	13	.567	32	–	26	.552
Oklahoma State ‍‍‍^{y}	15	–	12	.556	30	–	25	.545
Cincinnati ‍‍‍^{y}	16	–	14	.533	33	–	26	.559
Texas Tech ‍‍‍	13	–	17	.433	20	–	33	.377
Baylor ‍‍‍	13	–	17	.433	33	–	22	.600
Houston ‍‍‍	12	–	17	.414	30	–	25	.545
BYU ‍‍‍	10	–	20	.333	28	–	27	.509
UCF ‍‍‍	9	–	21	.300	29	–	26	.527
Utah ‍‍‍	8	–	22	.267	21	–	29	.420
† – Conference champion ‡ – Tournament champion y – Invited to the NCAA tournament As of June 23, 2025; Rankings from D1baseball

The 2025 Arizona Wildcats baseball team represented the University of Arizona during the 2025 NCAA Division I baseball season. The Wildcats played their home games for the 14th season at Hi Corbett Field. The team was coached by Chip Hale in his 4th season at Arizona. This season was Arizona's 1st season participating as members of the Big 12 Conference, having departed the Pac-12 Conference after 45 seasons. The Wildcats won their first Big 12 Conference tournament championship, defeating TCU 2–1 in extra innings. It was their 2nd consecutive Conference championship and the Wildcats received the Big 12’s automatic bid to the 2025 NCAA Tournament, their 44th all-time. This marked the 5th consecutive postseason appearance for the Wildcats, the longest such streak since 1959-1963. Arizona was placed in the Eugene Regional, where they defeated Cal Poly twice and Utah Valley to advance to face #1 North Carolina. They upset the Tar Heels 2 games to 1 in the Chapel Hill Super Regional to advance to their 19th College World Series appearance all-time and 1st since 2021. They subsequently were eliminated in two games losing to #11 Coastal Carolina - in a rematch of the 2016 College World Series final - and Louisville to end their season.

== Previous season ==
The Wildcats finished the 2024 season with a record of 36–23 (20–10 Conf.), winning the Pac-12 regular season championship. In the Pac-12 Conference Baseball Tournament in Scottsdale, AZ, the top-seeded Wildcats defeated Washington in pool play before falling to California. By virtue of having the best record of the non-advancing teams, Arizona advanced to the Finals as the Wild Card team where they defeated Stanford and - in a walk-off - USC to claim the Pac-12 Tournament title. The team subsequently was selected to the postseason for a 4th consecutive season for the 1st time since 1960–1963. For the 1st time since their College World Series-bound campaign in 2021, the Wildcats were named as regional hosts. In the Tucson Regional they went 0–2, losing to Grand Canyon and Dallas Baptist to end their season.

== Preseason ==
During the offseason, the Wildcats participated in 3 fall exhibition games. On October 3 the team again participated in the Mexican Baseball Fiesta held at Tucson's Kino Veterans Memorial Stadium, defeating for a 2nd consecutive season the Naranjeros de Hermosillo of the Mexican Pacific League 7–1. Arizona next played a doubleheader against Pima Community College on October 12 at Hi Corbett Field, winning both matches by scores of 16–2 and 2–0. The Wildcats concluded the preseason on October 18 with a doubleheader against Central Arizona College at Hi Corbett Field.

=== Coaches poll ===
The coaches poll was released on January 23, 2025. Arizona was voted to finish second Big 12.

Coaches' Poll
Predicted finish	Team	Points
1	Oklahoma State	163 (9)
2	Arizona	152 (4)
3	TCU	149 (1)
4	West Virginia	115
5	Texas Tech	111
6	Arizona State	96
7	UCF	93
8	Kansas State	88
9	Kansas	85
10	Cincinnati	73
11	Houston	45
12	Utah	44
13	Baylor	39
14	BYU	21

== Personnel ==
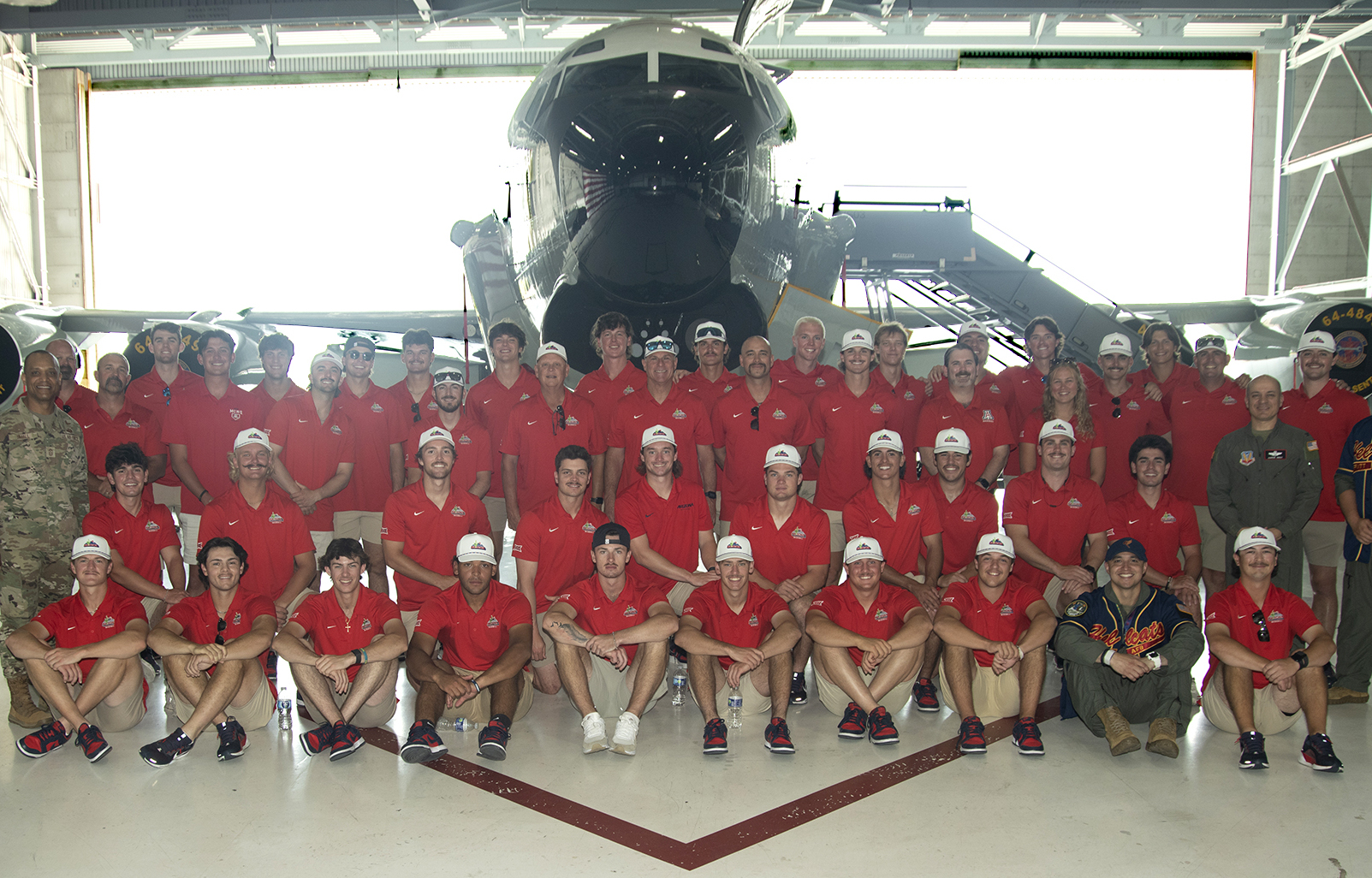
The 2025 Wildcats baseball team during the College World Series

=== Roster ===
2025 Arizona Wildcats baseball roster
Pitchers • 8 - Mason Russell - Freshman • 10 - Raul Garayzar - Senior • 13 - Carson Johnson - Freshman • 17 - Owen Kramkowski - Sophomore • 19 - Jack Berg - Sophomore • 22 - Smith Bailey - Freshman • 25 - Christian Coppola - Junior • 28 - Matthew Martinez - Senior • 29 - Eric Orloff - Senior • 31 - Michael Hilker Jr. - Junior • 34 - Collin McKinney - Sophomore • 35 - Bryce McKnight - Sophomore • 37 - Tony Pluta - Junior • 38 - Hunter Alberini - Junior • 40 - Kenan Elarton - Freshman • 49 - Julian Tonghini - Senior • 55 - Karter Muck - Junior • 99 - Garrett Hicks - Junior	Catchers • 18 - Adonys Guzman - Junior • 45 - Kade Thompson - Freshman • 52 - Bryk Barnard - Freshman Infielders • 1 - Garen Caulfield - Senior • 2 - Ethan Guerra - Junior • 3 - Andrew Cain - Sophomore • 5 - Mathis Meurant - Junior • 7 - Richie Morales - Senior • 24 - Mason White - Junior • 33 - Maddox Mihalakis - Junior • 36 - Tony Lira - Freshman • 44 - Jackson Forbes - Freshman • 47 - Nate Novitski - Freshman	Outfielders • 4 - Brendan Summerhill - Junior • 11 - Aaron Walton - Junior • 12 - Easton Breyfogle - Sophomore • 14 - Gunner Geile - Freshman • 23 - TJ Adams - Sophomore • 30 - Dom Rodriguez - Junior • 41 - Tyler Russell - Freshman Utility • 16 - Casey Hintz - Junior • 20 - Tommy Splaine - Senior

=== Coaches ===
2025 Arizona Wildcats baseball coaching staff
- Chip Hale - Head coach
- Trip Couch - Assistant coach
- Kevin Vance - Assistant coach
- Toby Demello - Volunteer assistant coach

=== Opening day ===
Opening Day Starters
Name	Position
Brendan Summerhill	Right fielder
Garen Caulfield	Second baseman
Mason White	Shortstop
Aaron Walton	Center Fielder
Andrew Cain	Designated hitter
Tommy Splaine	First baseman
Easton Breyfogle	Left fielder
Adonys Guzman	Catcher
Richie Morales	Third baseman
Collin McKinney	Starting pitcher

== Schedule and results ==
2025 Arizona Wildcats baseball game log (44–21)
Regular season (36–18)
Date	Opponent	Rank	Site/Stadium	Score	Win	Loss	Save	Overall Record	Big 12 Record
Feb 14	vs. Ole Miss	#21	Globe Life Field • Arlington, TX	L 1–2	Elliott (1–0)	McKinney (0–1)	Spencer (1)	0–1	
Feb 15	vs. #15 Clemson	#21	Globe Life Field • Arlington, TX	L 5–16	Titsworth (1–0)	Kramkowski (0–1)	None	0–2	
Feb 16	vs. Louisville	#21	Globe Life Field • Arlington, TX	L 1–13	Hartman (1–0)	Hilker (0–1)	None	0–3	
Feb 18	New Mexico		Hi Corbett Field • Tucson, AZ	W 10–0	Johnson (1–0)	Alvarez (0–1)	None	1–3	
Feb 21	San Diego		Hi Corbett Field • Tucson, AZ	W 11–0	Hintz (1–0)	Scolari (0–1)	None	2–3	
Feb 22	San Diego		Hi Corbett Field • Tucson, AZ	W 5–4	Hicks (1–0)	Cody (0–2)	None	3–3	
Feb 23	San Diego		Hi Corbett Field • Tucson, AZ	W 12–6	Hilker (1–1)	Gonzalez (0–1)	None	4–3	
Feb 26	at Rice		Reckling Park • Houston, TX	W 11–8	Hicks (2–0)	Zatopek (0–1)	None	5–3	
Feb 28	vs. #1 Texas A&M		Daikin Park • Houston, TX	W 3–2	Hintz (2–0)	Freshcorn (1–2)	None	6–3	
Mar 1	vs. #18 Mississippi State		Daikin Park • Houston, TX	W 6–5	Kramkowski (1–1)	Ligon (1–1)	Pluta (1)	7–3	
Mar 2	vs. #3 Tennessee		Daikin Park • Houston, TX	L 1–5	Arvidson (1–0)	Bailey (0–1)	None	7–4	
Mar 6	Pepperdine		Hi Corbett Field • Tucson, AZ	W 7–2	Johnson (2–0)	Cole (0–1)	None	8–4	
Mar 7	Pepperdine		Hi Corbett Field • Tucson, AZ	W 3–1	Hintz (3–0)	Valentine (1–2)	None	9–4	
Mar 8	Pepperdine		Hi Corbett Field • Tucson, AZ	W 21–2	Kramkowski (2–1)	Boyer (1–2)	None	10–4	
Mar 9	Pepperdine		Hi Corbett Field • Tucson, AZ	W 5–3	Hicks (3–0)	Queen (1–2)	Pluta (2)	11–4	
Mar 11	Arizona State		Hi Corbett Field • Tucson, AZ	W 3–2	Tonghini (1–0)	Carlon (1–1)	Pluta (3)	12–4	
Mar 14	Cincinnati		Hi Corbett Field • Tucson, AZ	W 8–3	Hintz (4–0)	Bergmann (0–1)	Hicks (1)	13–4	1–0
Mar 15	Cincinnati		Hi Corbett Field • Tucson, AZ	W 14–2	Kramkowski (3–1)	Barnett (1–2)	None	14–4	2–0
Mar 16	Cincinnati		Hi Corbett Field • Tucson, AZ	W 11–1	Bailey (1–1)	Pineiro (2–2)	None	15–4	3–0
Mar 18	Kansas		Hi Corbett Field • Tucson, AZ	W 5–0	Martinez (1–0)	Parker (0–1)	None	16–4	
Mar 21	at West Virginia		Kendrick Family Ballpark • Morgantown, WV	W 6–4	Tonghini (2–0)	Meyer (4–1)	Martinez (1)	17–4	4–0
Mar 22	at West Virginia		Kendrick Family Ballpark • Morgantown, WV	L 3–11	Bassinger (2–0)	Kramkowski (3–2)	None	17–5	4–1
Mar 23	at West Virginia		Kendrick Family Ballpark • Morgantown, WV	W 11–4	Hintz (5–0)	Hutson (1–1)	None	18–5	5–1
Mar 26	Seattle U	#23	Hi Corbett Field • Tucson, AZ	W 8–6	Orloff (1–0)	Liddle (1–1)	Pluta (4)	19–5	
Mar 28	Baylor	#23	Hi Corbett Field • Tucson, AZ	L 5–8	Glatch (2–0)	Hintz (5–1)	Craig (5)	19–6	5–2
Mar 29	Baylor	#23	Hi Corbett Field • Tucson, AZ	L 3–5	Grayson (3–0)	Kramkowski (3–3)	Craig (6)	19–7	5–3
Mar 30	Baylor	#23	Hi Corbett Field • Tucson, AZ	W 11–6	Tonghini (3–0)	Bailey (2–1)	None	20–7	6–3
Apr 1	at Grand Canyon		Brazell Field • Phoenix, AZ	L 5–11	Cunnings (2–1)	Elarton (0–1)	Gregory (1)	20–8	
Apr 4	at #24 Arizona State		Phoenix Municipal Stadium • Phoenix, AZ	W 8–5	Hintz (6–1)	Halvorson (2–1)	Hicks (2)	21–8	7–3
Apr 5	at #24 Arizona State		Phoenix Municipal Stadium • Phoenix, AZ	W 5–3	Kramkowski (4–3)	Halvorson (3–2)	Pluta (5)	22–8	8–3
Apr 6	at #24 Arizona State		Phoenix Municipal Stadium • Phoenix, AZ	L 4–8	Carlon (2–0)	Tonghini (3–1)	None	22–9	8–4
Apr 8	New Mexico State	#24	Hi Corbett Field • Tucson, AZ	W 11–9	Tonghini (4–1)	Hoslett (2–3)	Pluta (6)	23–9	
Apr 11	Oklahoma State	#24	Hi Corbett Field • Tucson, AZ	L 2–4^{10}	Bodendorf (7–1)	Hintz (6–2)	None	23–10	8–5
Apr 12	Oklahoma State	#24	Hi Corbett Field • Tucson, AZ	W 5–1	Kramkowski (5–3)	Pesca (2–1)	Pluta (7)	24–10	9–5
Apr 13	Oklahoma State	#24	Hi Corbett Field • Tucson, AZ	W 5–4	Hicks (4–0)	Wech (0–4)	None	25–10	10–5
Apr 15	Grand Canyon	#22	Hi Corbett Field • Tucson, AZ	W 14–4^{7}	Martinez (2–0)	Key (1–4)	None	26–10	
Apr 17	at BYU	#22	Larry H. Miller Field • Provo, UT	L 5–12	Gubler (4–2)	Hintz (6–3)	None	26–11	10–6
Apr 18	at BYU	#22	Larry H. Miller Field • Provo, UT	W 5–4	Kramkowski (6–3)	Harris (1–4)	Pluta (8)	27–11	11–6
Apr 19	at BYU	#22	Larry H. Miller Field • Provo, UT	W 7–5	Alberini (1–0)	Coon (2–1)	Hintz (1)	28–11	12–6
Apr 23	UT Arlington	#16	Hi Corbett Field • Tucson, AZ	W 9–3	McKnight (1–0)	Sears (0–2)	None	29–11	
Apr 26	at Texas Tech	#16	Dan Law Field • Lubbock, TX	L 3–12	Heuer (2–2)	Hintz (6–4)	None	29–12	12–7
Apr 26	at Texas Tech	#16	Dan Law Field • Lubbock, TX	W 2–1	Kramkowski (7–3)	Boudreau (1–3)	Pluta (9)	30–12	13–7
Apr 27	at Texas Tech	#16	Dan Law Field • Lubbock, TX	L 3–9	Cebert (5–2)	Bailey (1–2)	None	30–13	13–8
Apr 29	New Mexico State	#24	Hi Corbett Field • Tucson, AZ	W 6–2	Hilker (2–1)	Sneddon (0–1)	Pluta (10)	31–13	
May 2	TCU	#24	Hi Corbett Field • Tucson, AZ	W 6–3	Hicks (5–0)	Sloan (3–3)	Pluta (11)	32–13	14–8
May 3	TCU	#24	Hi Corbett Field • Tucson, AZ	W 5–4	Garayzar (1–0)	Feser (1–2)	Hintz (2)	33–13	15–8
May 4	TCU	#24	Hi Corbett Field • Tucson, AZ	L 6–13	Brassfield (5–1)	Bailey (1–3)	None	33–14	15–9
May 6	at Grand Canyon	#22	Brazell Field • Phoenix, AZ	L 2–5	Cunnings (3–1)	Tonghini (4–2)	Quinn (9)	33–15	
May 9	Utah	#22	Hi Corbett Field • Tucson, AZ	L 6–8	McAnelly (4–4)	Kramkowski (7–4)	Conaway (1)	33–16	15–10
May 10	Utah	#22	Hi Corbett Field • Tucson, AZ	L 5–13	Jones (3–6)	McKinney (0–2)	None	33–17	15–11
May 11	Utah	#22	Hi Corbett Field • Tucson, AZ	W 8–7	Pluta (1–0)	Fine (0–2)	None	34–17	16–11
May 15	at Houston		Schroeder Park • Houston, TX	L 4–13	Jean (5–2)	Kramkowski (7–5)	None	34–18	16–12
May 16	at Houston		Schroeder Park • Houston, TX	W 14–6	Martinez (3–0)	Solis (2–2)	None	35–18	17–12
May 17	at Houston		Schroeder Park • Houston, TX	W 8–1	Bailey (2–3)	Hoffman (1–1)	None	36–18	18–12
Big 12 Conference Tournament (3–0)
May 22	vs. (12) BYU	(4)	Globe Life Field • Arlington, TX	W 4-1	Kramkowski (8–5)	Porter (1–1)	Pluta (12)	37–18	
May 23	vs. (1) West Virginia	(4)	Globe Life Field • Arlington, TX	W 12–1	Garayzar (2–0)	Kartsonas (6–3)	None	38–18	
May 24	vs. (3) TCU	(4)	Globe Life Field • Arlington, TX	W 2–1	Pluta (2–0)	Sloan (3–4)	None	39–18	
NCAA Eugene Regional (3–0)
May 30	vs. (3) Cal Poly	(2) #21	PK Park • Eugene, OR	W 3–2	Kramkowski (9–5)	Naess (7–3)	Pluta (13)	40–18	
May 31	vs. (4) Utah Valley	(2) #21	PK Park • Eugene, OR	W 14–4	Hintz (7–4)	Kennedy (5–5)	Hilker (1)	41–18	
Jun 1	vs. (3) Cal Poly	(2) #21	PK Park • Eugene, OR	W 14–0	Bailey (3–3)	Marmie (4–4)	None	42–18	
NCAA Chapel Hill Super Regional (2–1)
Jun 6	at #1 North Carolina	#21	Boshamer Stadium • Chapel Hill, NC	L 2–18	Knapp (14–0)	Kramkowski (9–6)	None	42–19	
Jun 7	at #1 North Carolina	#21	Boshamer Stadium • Chapel Hill, NC	W 10–8	Pluta (3–0)	McDuffie (3–2)	None	43–19	
Jun 8	at #1 North Carolina	#21	Boshamer Stadium • Chapel Hill, NC	W 4–3	Tonghini (5–2)	McDuffie (3–3)	Pluta (14)	44–19	
College World Series (0–2)
Jun 13	vs. #11 Coastal Carolina	#21	Charles Schwab Field • Omaha, NE	L 4–7	Flukey (8–1)	Hicks (5−1)	Carbone (6)	44–20	
Jun 15	Louisville	#21	Charles Schwab Field • Omaha, NE	L 3–8	Biven (4–0)	Hicks (5−2)	None	44–21	

=== Eugene Regional ===
Eugene Regional Teams
(1) Oregon Ducks	(4) Utah Valley Wolverines	(2) Arizona Wildcats	(3) Cal Poly Mustangs

=== Chapel Hill Super Regional ===
Tucson Super Regional Teams
(5) North Carolina Tar Heels	vs.	Arizona Wildcats

== College World Series ==
2025 College World Series Teams
(13) Coastal Carolina Chanticleers	Arizona Wildcats	(8) Oregon State Beavers	Louisville Cardinals	(15) UCLA Bruins	Murray State Racers	(3) Arkansas Razorbacks	(6) LSU Tigers

First round	Second round
13	Coastal Carolina	7
Arizona	4
13	Coastal Carolina	6
8	Oregon State	2
8	Oregon State	4
Louisville	3
Bracket 1
Arizona	3
Louisville	8
Louisville	7
8	Oregon State	6
15	UCLA	6
Murray State	4
15	UCLA	5
6	LSU	9
3	Arkansas	1
6	LSU	4
Bracket 2
Murray State	0
3	Arkansas	3
3	Arkansas	7
15	UCLA	3

Semifinals
13	Coastal Carolina	11	–
Louisville	3	–
6	LSU	6	–
3	Arkansas	5	–

Finals
13	Coastal Carolina	0	3	–
6	LSU	1	5	–

== Rankings ==
Ranking movements Legend: ██ Increase in ranking ██ Decrease in ranking — = Not ranked RV = Received votes
	Week																
Poll	Pre	1	2	3	4	5	6	7	8	9	10	11	12	13	14	15	Final
Coaches'	RV	RV*	RV	RV	RV	25	RV	24	25	21	20	19	14	11	11	11	
Baseball America	—	—	—	—	—	—	—	—	—	24	16	11	8	8	8	8*	
NCBWA†	RV	RV	RV	RV	RV	RV	RV	25	RV	20	17	21	19	15	12	10	
D1Baseball	—	—	—	24	24	24	—	21	21	21	21	19	14	11	11	11	
Perfect Game	23	19	20	15	15	16	21	19	19	18	14	14	12	10	9	9*	

† NCBWA ranks 30 teams in their preseason poll, but only ranks 25 teams weekly during the season.
* A new poll was not released for this week, so for comparison purposes, the previous week's ranking is inserted in this week's slot.

== 2025 MLB draft ==
Player	Position	Round	Overall	MLB team
Brendan Summerhill	OF	1	42	Tampa Bay Rays
Aaron Walton	OF	2	66	Cleveland Guardians
Mason White	SS	4	118	Boston Red Sox
Adonys Guzman	C	5	144	Pittsburgh Pirates
Julian Tonghini	RHP	7	201	Washington Nationals
Hunter Alberini	RHP	11	338	Kansas City Royals
Casey Hintz	RHP	16	482	Seattle Mariners
Raul Garayzar	RHP	18	543	Arizona Diamondbacks
Michael Hilker Jr.	RHP	20	599	Minnesota Twins
