= 2025 West Virginia Mountaineers baseball team =

American college baseball season

2025 West Virginia Mountaineers baseball

Big 12 Regular season champions NCAA Clemson Regional champions

NCAA Baton Rouge Super Regional, 0–2
- Conference: Big 12 Conference

Ranking
- Coaches: No. 17
- D1Baseball.com: No. 14
- Record: 44–16 (19–9 Big 12)
- Head coach: Steve Sabins (1st season)
- Assistant coaches: Jacob Garcia (6th season); Jimmy Roesinger (2nd season); Justin Oney (1st season)
- Home stadium: Wagener Field at Kendrick Family Ballpark

2025 Big 12 Conference baseball standings
	Conf.				Overall
Team	W		L	PCT	W		L	PCT
No. 14 West Virginia ‍†‍‍^{y}	19	–	9	.679	44	–	16	.733
Kansas ‍‍‍^{y}	20	–	10	.667	43	–	17	.717
TCU ‍‍‍^{y}	19	–	11	.633	39	–	20	.661
No. 7 Arizona ‍‍‡‍^{y}	18	–	12	.600	44	–	21	.677
Arizona State ‍‍‍^{y}	18	–	12	.600	36	–	24	.600
Kansas State ‍‍‍^{y}	17	–	13	.567	32	–	26	.552
Oklahoma State ‍‍‍^{y}	15	–	12	.556	30	–	25	.545
Cincinnati ‍‍‍^{y}	16	–	14	.533	33	–	26	.559
Texas Tech ‍‍‍	13	–	17	.433	20	–	33	.377
Baylor ‍‍‍	13	–	17	.433	33	–	22	.600
Houston ‍‍‍	12	–	17	.414	30	–	25	.545
BYU ‍‍‍	10	–	20	.333	28	–	27	.509
UCF ‍‍‍	9	–	21	.300	29	–	26	.527
Utah ‍‍‍	8	–	22	.267	21	–	29	.420
† – Conference champion ‡ – Tournament champion y – Invited to the NCAA tournament As of June 23, 2025; Rankings from D1baseball

The 2025 West Virginia Mountaineers baseball team represents West Virginia University during the 2025 NCAA Division I baseball season. The Mountaineers play their home games at Wagener Field at Kendrick Family Ballpark as a member of the Big 12 Conference. They were led by first year head coach, Steve Sabins. The Mountaineers finished the season 44–16 and a Big 12 regular-season championship. West Virginia swept the Clemson Regional with two wins over Kentucky Wildcats and one over the No. 11 ranked Clemson Tigers. With the regional title, the Mountaineers advanced to the Baton Rouge Super Regional—marking their second consecutive Super Regional appearance—where they were eliminated by the No. 6 national seed, LSU Tigers, in two games.

== Previous season ==
The 2024 season marked the final year for head coach Randy Mazey, who retired following the conclusion of the campaign. West Virginia finished with an overall record of 36–24 and a 19–11 mark in Big 12 play. The Mountaineers captured the first NCAA Regional title in program history by winning the Tucson Regional. Their season concluded in the Chapel Hill Super Regional, where they were eliminated in two games by the North Carolina Tar Heels.

== Offseason ==
=== 2024 MLB draft ===
2024 MLB draft class
Round	Overall pick	Player	Position	MLB team
1	7	JJ Wetherholt	INF	St Louis Cardinals
4	133	David Hagaman	RHP	Texas Rangers
5	146	Aidan Major	RHP	Cleveland Guardians
9	262	Derek Clark	LHP	Los Angeles Angels
16	478	Tyler Switalski	LHP	San Francisco Giants

=== Acquisitions ===
==== Incoming transfers ====
Incoming transfers
Name	Number	Pos.	Height	Weight	Year	Former School	Notes
Jack Kartsonas	67	RHP	6’4”	220	Graduate	Kent State	
Tyler Hutson	53	RHP	6’4”	200	Senior	Southern Indiana	
Jace Rinehart	0	OF	6’0”	215	Senior	USC Upstate	
Reese Bassinger	29	RHP	6’1”	185	Senior	Tarleton State	
Chase Swain	24	SS	6’0”	185	RS Junior	Manhattan	
Griffin Kirn	54	LHP	6’3”	215	RS Senior	Quincy	

== Preseason ==
=== Preseason Big 12 awards and honors ===
Preseason All-Big 12 Team
Player	No.	Position	Class	Designation
Logan Sauve	33	C	Junior	First Team

=== Big 12 Coaches poll ===
The coaches poll was released on January 23, 2025. West Virginia was picked to finish fourth in the Big 12.

Big 12 coaches poll
Predicted finish	Team	Votes (1st place)
1	Oklahoma State	163 (9)
2	Arizona	152 (4)
3	TCU	149 (1)
4	West Virginia	115
5	Texas Tech	111
6	Arizona State	96
7	UCF	93
8	Kansas State	88
9	Kansas	85
10	Cincinnati	73
11	Houston	45
12	Utah	44
13	Baylor	39
14	BYU	2

== Personnel ==
=== Coaching staff ===
2025 West Virginia Mountaineers coaching staff
- Steve Sabins - Head coach - 1st year (10th overall)
- Jacob Garcia - Associate Coach/Recruiting Coordinator - 6th year
- Jimmy Roesinger - Assistant Coach - 2nd year
- Justin Oney - Assistant Coach - 1st year

=== Support staff ===
2025 West Virginia Mountaineers support staff
- Joey Cuomo – Director of operations – 3rd year
- Christopher Reilly – Director of Pitching & Personnel – 1st year
- Drew Hefner – Director of player development – 2nd year
- Jedd Gyorko – Special Assistant to Head Coach – 1st year

=== Roster ===
2025 West Virginia Mountaineers baseball team
Players
Coaches

#	Pos.	Name	B/T	Height	Weight	Year	Home town
0	OF	Jace Rinehart	L/R	6 ft 0 in (1.83 m)	215 lb (98 kg)	Sr	(West Virginia) Mannington, WV
1	RHP	JJ Glasscock	R/R	6 ft 0 in (1.83 m)	170 lb (77 kg)	RS Fr	Fluvanna County, VA
2	C	Gavin Kelly	R/R	6 ft 0 in (1.83 m)	175 lb (79 kg)	Fr	Pittsburgh, PA
4	OF	Jorge Valdes	L/R	5 ft 9 in (1.75 m)	165 lb (75 kg)	Fr	Milton, Ontario
5	INF	Armani Guzman	L/L	5 ft 10 in (1.78 m)	205 lb (93 kg)	So	New York, NY
6	OF	Skylar King	L/L	6 ft 1 in (1.85 m)	180 lb (82 kg)	Jr	Columbia, SC
7	OF	Michael Perazza	L/L	6 ft 3 in (1.91 m)	195 lb (88 kg)	So	Naples, FL
9	INF	Grant Hussey	L/R	6 ft 3 in (1.91 m)	225 lb (102 kg)	Sr	(West Virginia) Parkersburg, WV
10	RHP	David Hagen	R/R	6 ft 2 in (1.88 m)	185 lb (84 kg)	Fr	Loveland, OH
11	UTL	Sam White	L/R	5 ft 11 in (1.8 m)	195 lb (88 kg)	Jr	Aurora, Ontario
12	INF	Brodie Kresser	R/R	6 ft 1 in (1.85 m)	180 lb (82 kg)	Sr	Jesup, IA
13	INF	Ryan Maggy	L/R	6 ft 1 in (1.85 m)	195 lb (88 kg)	Fr	Peru, NY
15	LHP	Maxx Yehl	L/L	6 ft 6 in (1.98 m)	235 lb (107 kg)	Jr	Portville, NY
16	RHP	Benjamin Hudson	L/R	6 ft 2 in (1.88 m)	180 lb (82 kg)	Fr	Medford, NJ
17	LHP	Joseph Fredericks	L/L	5 ft 9 in (1.75 m)	185 lb (84 kg)	So	Virginia Beach, VA
18	INF	Spencer Barnett	L/R	6 ft 2 in (1.88 m)	205 lb (93 kg)	So	Pittsburgh, PA
19	INF	Jackson Ingram	R/R	5 ft 10 in (1.78 m)	160 lb (73 kg)	Fr	Staunton, VA
20	RHP	Luke Lyman	R/R	6 ft 5 in (1.96 m)	212 lb (96 kg)	Jr	Berryville, VA
21	LHP	Cole Fehrman	R/L	6 ft 3 in (1.91 m)	180 lb (82 kg)	Jr	Doylestown, PA
23	INF	Ellis Garcia	R/R	6 ft 0 in (1.83 m)	215 lb (98 kg)	Jr	Elmwood Park, NJ
24	INF	Chase Swain	R/R	6 ft 0 in (1.83 m)	195 lb (88 kg)	RS Jr	Elsinboro, NJ
25	LHP	JD Costanzo	L/L	5 ft 10 in (1.78 m)	165 lb (75 kg)	Fr	Pittsburgh, PA
29	RHP	Reese Bassinger	R/R	6 ft 1 in (1.85 m)	185 lb (84 kg)	Sr	Wylie, TX
30	RHP	Tucker DeLisle	R/R	6 ft 2 in (1.88 m)	190 lb (86 kg)	Fr	Philadelphia, PA
31	UTL	Alex Marot	R/R	6 ft 2 in (1.88 m)	200 lb (91 kg)	RS Fr	Johnston, RI
33	C	Logan Sauve	R/R	5 ft 10 in (1.78 m)	185 lb (84 kg)	Jr	Boiling Springs, PA
34	RHP	Bryant Yoak	R/R	6 ft 2 in (1.88 m)	180 lb (82 kg)	Fr	(West Virginia) Big Bend, WV
35	RHP	Gavin Van Kempen	R/R	6 ft 6 in (1.98 m)	245 lb (111 kg)	Jr	Castleton, NY
37	INF	Ben Lumsden	L/R	6 ft 3 in (1.91 m)	200 lb (91 kg)	Jr	Simpsonville, SC
39	INF	Kyle West	L/R	6 ft 4 in (1.93 m)	195 lb (88 kg)	Sr	(West Virginia) Hedgesville, WV
40	RHP	Carson Estridge	L/R	6 ft 7 in (2.01 m)	210 lb (95 kg)	Jr	Haymarket, VA
41	OF	Maxwell Molessa	L/R	5 ft 11 in (1.8 m)	192 lb (87 kg)	Fr	(West Virginia) Pullman, WV
42	RHP	Carlos Caraballo	R/R	6 ft 1 in (1.85 m)	195 lb (88 kg)	Fr	Hanover, PA
43	RHP	Robby Porco	R/R	6 ft 8 in (2.03 m)	235 lb (107 kg)	Jr	Warrington, PA
45	RHP	Aiden Cody	R/R	6 ft 0 in (1.83 m)	190 lb (86 kg)	Fr	Spring Lake Heights, NJ
46	RHP	Mac Stiffler	R/R	6 ft 7 in (2.01 m)	210 lb (95 kg)	Fr	Hagerstown, MD
52	RHP	Aidan Smith	R/R	6 ft 3 in (1.91 m)	215 lb (98 kg)	So	Silver Spring, MD
53	RHP	Tyler Hutson	L/R	6 ft 4 in (1.93 m)	200 lb (91 kg)	Sr	Villa Hills, KY
54	RHP	Griffin Kirn	L/L	6 ft 3 in (1.91 m)	215 lb (98 kg)	RS Sr	Quincy, IL
55	RHP	Ben McDougal	L/L	6 ft 5 in (1.96 m)	200 lb (91 kg)	Jr	(West Virginia) Bridgeport, WV
67	RHP	Jack Kartsonas	R/R	6 ft 4 in (1.93 m)	220 lb (100 kg)	Gr	Pittsburgh, PA
88	RHP	Bryson Hoff	R/R	6 ft 2 in (1.88 m)	185 lb (84 kg)	Fr	(West Virginia) Charleston, WV
99	RHP	Chase Meyer	R/R	6 ft 2 in (1.88 m)	175 lb (79 kg)	So	Daytona Beach, FL

Head coach

Steve Sabins

Assistant coach(es)

Justin Oney

Pitching coach(es)

Jimmy Roesinger

Legend

- (C) Team captain
- (S) Suspended
- (I) Ineligible
- Injured
- Current redshirt

== Schedule and results ==
2025 West Virginia Mountaineers baseball game log (44–16)
Legend: = Win = Loss = Canceled Bold = West Virginia team member
Regular season (40–13)

February (9–0)
Date	Time (ET)	TV	Opponent	Rank	Stadium	Score	Win	Loss	Save	Attend	Overall Record	Big 12 Record	Sources
Feb. 14	6:00 pm	ESPN+	at Jacksonville*	—	John Sessions Stadium; Jacksonville, FL	**W** 4-2	**Kirn** **(1-0)**	Long (0-1)	**Bassinger** **(1)**	638	1-0	—	
Feb. 15	1:00 pm	ESPN+	at Jacksonville*	—	John Sessions Stadium; Jacksonville, FL	**W** 10-3	**Estridge** **(1-0)**	Barquin (0-1)	—	755	2-0	—	
Feb. 15	4:30 pm	ESPN+	at Jacksonville*	—	John Sessions Stadium; Jacksonville, FL	**W** 3-2	**Van Kempen** **(1-0)**	Colin (0-1)	**Bassinger** **(2)**	729	3-0	—	
Feb. 22	2:00 pm		at Lipscomb*	—	Dugan Field; Nashville, TN	**W** 5-4	**Kartsonas** **(1-0)**	Lynch (0-1)	**Bassinger** **(3)**	237	4-0	—	
Feb. 23	1:00 pm	ESPN+	at Lipscomb*	—	Dugan Field; Nashville, TN	**W** 5-0	**Meyer** **(1-0)**	Ramos (1-1)	—	324	5-0	—	
Feb. 23	4:30 pm	ESPN+	at Lipscomb*	—	Dugan Field; Nashville, TN	**W** 4-2	**Estridge** **(2-0)**	Puckett (0-1)	—	324	6-0	—	
Feb. 24	12:00 pm	ESPN+	at Lipscomb*	—	Dugan Field; Nashville, TN	**W** 5-4	**Bassinger** **(1-0)**	Kantola (0-1)	—	113	7-0	—	
Feb. 26	2:00 pm	ESPN+	vs. Ohio*	—	Wagener Field at Kendrick Family Ballpark; Morgantown, WV	**W** 8-4	**Lyman** **(1-0)**	Geiser (0-1)	—	2,505	8-0	—	
Feb. 28	6:30 pm	ESPN+	at Queens*	—	Atrium Health Ballpark; Kannapolis, NC	**W** 7-1	**Kirn** **(2-0)**	Jurecka (0-2)	—	1,049	9-0	—	

March (13–4)
Date	Time (ET)	TV	Opponent	Rank	Stadium	Score	Win	Loss	Save	Attend	Overall Record	Big 12 Record	Sources
Mar. 1	2:00 pm	ESPN+	at Queens*	—	Atrium Health Ballpark; Kannapolis, NC	**W** 11-7	**Meyer** **(2-0)**	Green (0-1)	**Estridge** **(1)**	1,670	10-0	—	
Mar. 2	2:00 pm		at Queens*	—	First National Bank Field; Charlotte, NC	**W** 11-1	**Van Kempen** **(2-0)**	Quezada (0-2)	—	269	11-0	—	
Mar. 3	1:00 pm		at Queens*	#24	The Stick Williams Dreams Field; Charlotte, NC	**W** 17-3	**Hagen** **(1-0)**	Ruller (0-3)		172	12-0	–	
Mar. 7	2:00 pm	ESPN+	vs. Kennesaw State*		Wagener Field at Kendrick Family Ballpark; Morgantown, WV	**W** 16-2	**Kirn** **(3-0)**	Osbolt (0-1)	—	2,411	13-0	—	
Mar. 8	2:00 pm	ESPN+	vs. Kennesaw State*		Wagener Field at Kendrick Family Ballpark; Morgantown, WV	**L** 9-13	Renfroe (2-0)	**Kartsonas** **(1-1)**	—	2,544	13-1	—	
Mar. 9	12:00 pm	ESPN+	vs. Kennesaw State*		Wagener Field at Kendrick Family Ballpark; Morgantown, WV	**W** 14-7	**Hutson** **(1-0)**	Gold (0-1)	—	2,594	14-1	—	
Mar. 11	2:00 pm	ESPN+	vs. Towson*		Wagener Field at Kendrick Family Ballpark; Morgantown, WV	**W** 16-5	**Meyer** **(3-0)**	Rosario (0-2)	—	2,469	15-1	—	
Mar. 14	7:00 pm	ESPN+	at Oklahoma State		O'Brate Stadium; Stillwater, OK	**Canceled**			—		–	—	
Mar. 15	7:00 pm	ESPN+	at Oklahoma State		O'Brate Stadium; Stillwater, OK	**Canceled**			—		–	—	
Mar. 16	2:00 pm	ESPN+	at Oklahoma State		O'Brate Stadium; Stillwater, OK	**W** 8-6	**Meyer** **(4-0)**	Ure (1-1)	—	4,550	16-1	1-0	
Mar. 18	6:30 pm	ESPN+	vs. James Madison*		Wagener Field at Kendrick Family Ballpark; Morgantown, WV	**W** 11-1 (8 inn.)	**Stiffler** **(1-0)**	Tyler (0-1)	—	2,484	17-1	1-0	
Mar. 19	6:35 pm	ESPN+	vs. James Madison*		Wagener Field at Kendrick Family Ballpark; Morgantown, WV	**W** 3-1	**Hagen** **(2-0)**	Costello (0-1)	**Kartsonas (1)**	2,664	18-1	1-0	
Mar. 21	6:30 pm	ESPN+	vs. Arizona		Wagener Field at Kendrick Family Ballpark; Morgantown, WV	**L** 4-6 (16 innings)	Tonghini (2-0)	**Meyer** (4-1)	Martinez (1)	2,823	18-2	1-1	
Mar. 22	4:00 pm	ESPN+	vs. Arizona		Wagener Field at Kendrick Family Ballpark; Morgantown, WV	**W** 11-3	**Bassinger** **(2-0)**	Kramkowski (3-2)	—	2,724	19-2	2-1	
Mar. 23	12:00 pm	ESPN+	vs. Arizona		Wagener Field at Kendrick Family Ballpark; Morgantown, WV	**L** 4-11	Hintz (5-0)	**Hutson** **(1-1)**	—	2,812	19-3	2-2	
Mar. 25	6:30 pm	ESPN+	vs. Marshall*	—	Wagener Field at Kendrick Family Ballpark; Morgantown, WV	**W** 7-0	**Hutson** **(2-1)**	DiGiacomo (1-4)	—	3,244	20-3	2-2	
Mar. 27	8:30 pm	ESPN+	at BYU	—	Miller Park; Provo, UT	**L** 5-14	Reiser (3-0)	**Lyman** **(1-1)**	—	1,715	20-4	2-3	
Mar. 28	8:30 pm	ESPN+	at BYU	—	Miller Park; Provo, UT	**W** 20-6	**Meyer** **(5-1)**	Harris (1-2)	—	1,946	21-4	3-3	
Mar. 29	2:05 pm	ESPN+	at BYU	—	Miller Park; Provo, UT	**W** 19-16	**Stiffler** **(2-0)**	Marx (0-2)	**Meyer** **(1)**	1,898	22-4	4-3	

April (15–2)
Date	Time (ET)	TV	Opponent	Rank	Stadium	Score	Win	Loss	Save	Attend	Overall Record	Big 12 Record	Sources
Apr. 1	6:00 pm	B1G+	at Ohio State*		Bill Davis Stadium; Columbus, OH	**W** 9-6	**Fehrman** **(1-0)**	Giese (0-1)	**Bassinger** **(4)**	1,422	23-4	4-3	
Apr. 2	6:30 pm	ESPN+	vs. Pittsburgh*		Wagener Field at Kendrick Family Ballpark; Morgantown, WV	**W** 9-6	**Hudson** **(1-0)**	Doganiero (1-1)	—	4,629	24-4	4-3	
Apr. 4	6:30 pm	ESPN+	vs. Utah		Wagener Field at Kendrick Family Ballpark; Morgantown, WV	**W** 6-3	**Meyer** **(5-1)**	McAnelly (2-2)	—	2,763	25-4	5-3	
Apr. 5	1:00 pm	ESPN+	vs. Utah		Wagener Field at Kendrick Family Ballpark; Morgantown, WV	**W** 6-4	**Bassinger** **(3-0)**	Jones (2-4)	—	3,417	26-4	6-3	
Apr. 5	4:00 pm	ESPN+	vs. Utah		Wagener Field at Kendrick Family Ballpark; Morgantown, WV	**W** 14-4	**Kartsonas** **(2-1)**	Nielson (2-3)	—	3,417	27-4	7-3	
Apr. 8	6:30 pm	ESPN+	vs. Penn State*	—	Wagener Field at Kendrick Family Ballpark; Morgantown, WV	**Canceled**			—		–	—	
Apr. 11	7:30 pm	ESPN+	at Houston	—	Schroeder Park; Houston, TX	**W** 9-2	**Kirn** **(4-0)**	Schmitz (3-3)	**Bassinger** **(5)**	1,074	28-4	8-3	
Apr. 12	7:30 pm	ESPN+	at Houston	—	Schroeder Park; Houston, TX	**W** 9-8	**Hudson** **(2-0)**	Roman (0-5)	**Estridge** **(2)**	1,386	29-4	9-3	
Apr. 13	12:30 pm	ESPN+	at Houston	—	Schroeder Park; Houston, TX	**W** 11-4	**Kartsonas** **(3-1)**	Luzardo (1-1)	—	1,259	30-4	10-3	
Apr. 15	6:00 pm	ESPN+	at Marshall*	#24	Jack Cook Field; Huntington, WV	**W** 5-4	**Estridge** **(3-0)**	Baird (3-2)	—	2,620	31-4	—	
Apr. 17	6:30 pm	ESPN+	vs. Cincinnati	#24	Wagener Field at Kendrick Family Ballpark; Morgantown, WV	**W** 3–2	**Meyer** **(7–1)**	Taylor (4–1)	—	3,370	32–4	11–3	
Apr. 18	6:30 pm	ESPN+	vs. Cincinnati	#24	Wagener Field at Kendrick Family Ballpark; Morgantown, WV	**W** 6–4	**Bassinger** **(4–0)**	O'Connor (1–2)	**Estridge** **(3)**	4,289	33–4	12–3	
Apr. 19	2:00 pm	ESPN+	vs. Cincinnati	#24	Wagener Field at Kendrick Family Ballpark; Morgantown, WV	**W** 10–5	**Kartsonas** (4–1)	Marsh (3–3)	—	3,776	34–4	13–3	
Apr. 22	6:00 pm	BTN	at Penn State*	#17	Medlar Field at Lubrano Park; University Park, PA	**L** 2–3	**Butash** (3–1)	Hudson (2–1)	**Renner** (2)	6,106	34–5	—	
Apr. 25	6:30 pm	ESPN+	at UCF	#17	John Euliano Park; Orlando, FL	**W** 4–1	**Bassinger** (5–0)	Stagliano (1–3)	**Estridge** (4)	1,965	35–5	14–3	
Apr. 26	6:30 pm	ESPN+	at UCF	#17	John Euliano Park; Orlando, FL	**W** 15–10	**Meyer** (8–1)	Sosnowski (2–3)	—	2,245	36–5	15–3	
Apr. 27	1:00 pm	ESPN+	at UCF	#17	John Euliano Park; Orlando, FL	**W** 4–3	**Kartsonas** (5–1)	Sauser (3–1)	**McDougal** (1)	1,853	37–5	16–3	
Apr. 30	6:00 pm	ESPN+	at Marshall*	No. 16	GoMart Ballpark; Charleston, WV	**L** 6–7	Krebs (4–2)	**Meyer** (8–2)	—	9,639	37–6	—	

May (3–7)
Date	Time (ET)	TV	Opponent	Rank	Stadium	Score	Win	Loss	Save	Attend	Overall Record	Big 12 Record	Sources
May 3 (DH 1)	12:00 pm	ESPN+	vs. Texas Tech	No. 16	Wagener Field at Kendrick Family Ballpark; Morgantown, WV	**L** 4–6	Cebert (6–2)	**Kirn** (4–1)	Pirko (1)	3,848	37–7	16–4	
May 3 (DH 2)	4:00 pm	ESPN+	vs. Texas Tech	No. 16	Wagener Field at Kendrick Family Ballpark; Morgantown, WV	**W** 3–2	**Bassinger** (6–0)	Bourdreau (1–4)	—	3,848	38–7	17–4	
May 4	1:00 pm	ESPN+	vs. Texas Tech	No. 16	Wagener Field at Kendrick Family Ballpark; Morgantown, WV	**W** 5–0	**Kartsonas** (6–1)	Petty (1–3)	—	3,384	39–7	18–4	
May 6	6:00 pm	ESPN+	at Pittsburgh*	No. 12	Charles L. Cost Field; Pittsburgh, PA	**L** 9–10	Hummel (1–0)	**Stiffler** (2–1)	—	769	39–8	—	
May 9	7:00 pm	ESPN+	at Kansas State	No. 12	Tointon Family Stadium; Manhattan, KS	**L** 8–9	Ruhl (3–2)	**Estridge** (3–1)	—	2,344	39–9	18–5	
May 10	5:00 pm	ESPN+	at Kansas State	No. 12	Tointon Family Stadium; Manhattan, KS	**W** 10–3	**McDougal** (1–0)	Quevedo (6–2)	—	2,344	40–9	19–5	
May 11	2:00 pm	ESPN+	at Kansas State	No. 12	Tointon Family Stadium; Manhattan, KS	**L** 9–14	Slack (2–3)	**Bassinger** (6–1)	—	2,344	40–10	19–6	
May 15	6:30 pm	ESPN+	vs. Kansas	No. 16	Wagener Field at Kendrick Family Ballpark; Morgantown, WV	**L** 0–3	Voegele (7–4)	**Kirn** (4–2)	Breckheimer (7)	3,716	40–11	19–7	
May 16	6:30 pm	ESPN+	vs. Kansas	No. 16	Wagener Field at Kendrick Family Ballpark; Morgantown, WV	**L** 5–8	Moore (7–1)	McDougal (1–1)	—	4,084	40–12	19–8	
May 17	1:00 pm	ESPN+	vs. Kansas	No. 16	Wagener Field at Kendrick Family Ballpark; Morgantown, WV	**L** 0–7	Carr (5–1)	**Kartsonas** (6–2)	—	4,062	40–13	19–9	

Postseason (4–3)

Big 12 Tournament (1–1)
Date	Time (ET)	TV	Opponent	Seed	Stadium	Score	Win	Loss	Save	Attend	Overall Record	Tourney Record	Sources
May 22	1:30 pm	ESPN+	vs. Cincinnati	(1)	Globe Life Field; Arlington, TX	**W** 10–3	**Kirn** (5–2)	Marsh (3–5)	—	-	41–13	1–0	
May 22	5:00 pm	ESPN+	vs. Arizona	(1)	Globe Life Field	**L** 1–12	Garayzar (2–0)	**Kartsonas** (6–3)	—	-	41–14	1–1	

NCAA Tournament: Clemson Regional (3-0)
Date	Time (ET)	TV	Opponent	Seed	Stadium	Score	Win	Loss	Save	Attend	Overall Record	Tourney Record	Sources
May 30	2:45 pm	ESPNU	vs. (3) Kentucky	(2)	Doug Kingsmore Stadium; Clemson, SC	**W** 4–3	**Bassinger** (7–1)	Gregersen (0–6)	—	5,288	42−14	1–0	
May 31	5:00 pm	ESPN+	vs. (1) No. 14 Clemson	(2)	Doug Kingsmore Stadium	**W** 9–6	**Meyer** (9–2)	Mahlstedt (4–1)	**McDougal** (2)	6,475	43–14	2–0	
June 1	6:00 pm	ESPN+	vs. (3) Kentucky	(2)	Doug Kingsmore Stadium	**W** 13-12	**Hudson** (3-1)	McCoy (1-2)	**Kirn** (1)	5,330	44–14	3–0	-

NCAA Tournament: Baton Rouge Super Regional (0-2)
Date	Time (ET)	TV	Opponent	Seed	Stadium	Score	Win	Loss	Save	Attend	Overall Record	Tourney Record	Sources
June 7	2:00 pm	ESPN	vs. (6) No. 3 LSU		Alex Box Stadium; Baton Rouge, LA	**L** 9–16	Anderson (10–1)	**Kirn** (5–3)	—	12,093	44–15	3–2	
June 8	6:00 pm	ESPN2	vs. (6) No. 3 LSU		Alex Box Stadium	**L** 5–12	Eyanson (11–2)	**Kartsonas** (6–4)	—	12,301	44–16	3–3	

* indicates a non-conference game. All rankings from D1 Baseball Poll on the date of the contest.

== Statistics ==
=== Cumulative linescore ===
	1	2	3	4	5	6	7	8	9	10	11	12	Total
West Virginia													0
Opponents													0

== Awards and honors ==
=== Big 12 awards and honors ===
All-Big 12 Team
Player	No.	Position	Class	Designation
Logan Sauve	33	C	Junior	First Team
Griffin Kirn	54	RHP	Senior	First Team
Kyle West	39	OF	Senior	Second Team
Jack Kartsonas	67	RHP	Senior	Second Team
Gavin Kelly	2	C/OF	Freshman	Freshman Team

=== Weekly Honors ===
Player	Award	Date	Ref.
Griffin Kirn	Big 12 Pitcher of the Week	March 3	
Chase Meyer	Big 12 Pitcher of the Week	March 17	
Logan Sauve	Big 12 Player of the Week	April 14	

=== Watchlists ===
Player	Award	Ref.
Logan Sauve	Buster Posey Award	
Brodie Kresser	Brooks Wallace Award	

=== Regional awards and honors ===
All-Regional Team
Player	No.	Position	Class	Designation

== Rankings ==
Ranking movements Legend: ██ Increase in ranking ██ Decrease in ranking — = Not ranked RV = Received votes
	Week																	
Poll	Pre	1	2	3	4	5	6	7	8	9	10	11	12	13	14	15	16	Final
Coaches'	RV	RV*	RV	24	24	24	RV	25	23	20	14	13	13	17	23	24	24*	17
Baseball America	—	—	—	—	—	25	—	—	—	22	14	8	9	19	—	—	—	13
NCBWA†	29	25	22	22	21	20	23	23	20	18	10	10	13	14	17	23	12	12
D1Baseball	—	—	—	—	—	—	—	—	—	24	17	16	12	16	—	—	—	14
Perfect Game	21	21	21	16	13	13	16	11	11	11	9	4	7	14	23	23*	23*	14

† NCBWA ranks 30 teams in their preseason poll, but only ranks 25 teams weekly during the season.
* A new poll was not released for this week, so for comparison purposes, the previous week's ranking is inserted in this week's slot.

== NCAA Tournament ==
=== Clemson Regional ===
Bold indicates winner. Seeds for regional tournaments indicate seeds within regional. Seeds for super regional tournaments indicate national seeds only.

Clemson Regional Teams
(1) Clemson Tigers	(2) West Virginia Mountaineers	(3) Kentucky Wildcats	(4) SC Upstate Spartans

Clemson Regional Round 1
(3) Kentucky Wildcats	vs.	(2) West Virginia Mountaineers

May 30, 2025, 2:45 pm (EST) at Doug Kingsmore Stadium in Clemson, South Carolina
Team	1	2	3	4	5	6	7	8	9	R	H	E
(3) Kentucky	0	0	0	3	0	0	0	0	0	**3**	**5**	**2**
**(2) West Virginia**	0	0	0	0	2	1	0	0	1	**4**	**7**	**2**
WP: Reese Bassinger (7-1) LP: Simon Gregersen (0-6); Attendance: 5,288

Clemson Regional Round 2
(2) West Virginia Mountaineers	vs.	(1) Clemson Tigers

May 31, 2025, 6:00 pm (EST) at Doug Kingsmore Stadium in Clemson, South Carolina
Team	1	2	3	4	5	6	7	8	9	R	H	E
**(2) West Virginia**	3	0	0	0	1	0	0	1	4	**9**	**15**	**2**
(1) Clemson	0	1	0	0	0	4	1	0	1	**6**	**8**	**1**
WP: Chase Meyer (9-2) LP: Lucas Mahlstedt (4-1) Sv: Ben McDougal (2); Home runs: WVU: None; CLEM: Cannarella (5); Attendance: 6,475

Clemson Regional Final
(3) Kentucky Wildcats	vs.	(2) West Virginia Mountaineers

June 1, 2025, 6:00 pm (EST) at Doug Kingsmore Stadium in Clemson, South Carolina
Team	1	2	3	4	5	6	7	8	9	R	H	E
(3) Kentucky	0	4	1	1	2	3	0	1	0	**12**	**13**	**2**
**(2) West Virginia**	1	0	0	6	0	0	0	6	X	**13**	**12**	**5**
WP: Benjamin Hudson (3-1) LP: McCoy (1-2) Sv: Griffin Kirn (1); Home runs: UK: Brown (3) Burkes (6); WVU: Sauve (8); Attendance: 5,330

=== Baton Rouge Super Regional ===
Bold indicates winner. Seeds for regional tournaments indicate seeds within regional. Seeds for super regional tournaments indicate national seeds only.

Baton Rouge Super Regional Game 1
West Virginia Mountaineers	at	(6) LSU Tigers

June 7, 2025, 2:00 pm (EST) at Alex Box Stadium in Baton Rouge, Louisiana
Team	1	2	3	4	5	6	7	8	9	R	H	E
West Virginia	0	1	0	0	0	4	2	0	2	**9**	**11**	**1**
(6) LSU	0	0	0	3	7	6	0	0	X	**16**	**8**	**2**
WP: Kade Anderson (10-1) LP: Griffin Kirn (5-3); Home runs: WVU: West (11) Kelly (2); LSU: Pearson (7) Milam (11) Curiel (7); Attendance: 12,093

Baton Rouge Super Regional Game 2
West Virginia Mountaineers	at	(6) LSU Tigers

June 8, 2025, 7:00 pm (EST) at Alex Box Stadium in Baton Rouge, Louisiana
Team	1	2	3	4	5	6	7	8	9	R	H	E
(6) LSU	1	5	0	0	0	0	6	0	0	**12**	**10**	**1**
West Virginia	0	0	0	3	1	0	0	1	0	**5**	**6**	**3**
WP: Anthony Eyanson (11-2) LP: Jack Kartsonas (6-4); Home runs: WVU: Brown (8); LSU: White (5) Rinehart (9) Lumsden (2); Attendance: 12,301
