= 2025 TCU Horned Frogs baseball team =

College Baseball Season

2025 TCU Horned Frogs baseball

Corvallis Regional, 0–2
- Conference: Big 12 Conference

Ranking
- Coaches: No. 25
- D1Baseball.com: No. 22
- Record: 39–20 (19–11 Big 12)
- Head coach: Kirk Saarloos (4th as head coach, 13th overall season)
- Assistant coaches: Bill Mosiello (1st season); John DiLaura (7th season); Dave Lawn (2nd season)
- Home stadium: Lupton Stadium

2025 Big 12 Conference baseball standings
| | Conf. | | | | Overall |
| Team | W | | L | PCT | W | | L | PCT |
|---|---|---|---|---|---|---|---|---|
| No. 14 West Virginia ‍†‍‍^{y} | 19 | – | 9 | .679 | 44 | – | 16 | .733 |
| Kansas ‍‍‍^{y} | 20 | – | 10 | .667 | 43 | – | 17 | .717 |
| TCU ‍‍‍^{y} | 19 | – | 11 | .633 | 39 | – | 20 | .661 |
| No. 7 Arizona ‍‍‡‍^{y} | 18 | – | 12 | .600 | 44 | – | 21 | .677 |
| Arizona State ‍‍‍^{y} | 18 | – | 12 | .600 | 36 | – | 24 | .600 |
| Kansas State ‍‍‍^{y} | 17 | – | 13 | .567 | 32 | – | 26 | .552 |
| Oklahoma State ‍‍‍^{y} | 15 | – | 12 | .556 | 30 | – | 25 | .545 |
| Cincinnati ‍‍‍^{y} | 16 | – | 14 | .533 | 33 | – | 26 | .559 |
| Texas Tech ‍‍‍ | 13 | – | 17 | .433 | 20 | – | 33 | .377 |
| Baylor ‍‍‍ | 13 | – | 17 | .433 | 33 | – | 22 | .600 |
| Houston ‍‍‍ | 12 | – | 17 | .414 | 30 | – | 25 | .545 |
| BYU ‍‍‍ | 10 | – | 20 | .333 | 28 | – | 27 | .509 |
| UCF ‍‍‍ | 9 | – | 21 | .300 | 29 | – | 26 | .527 |
| Utah ‍‍‍ | 8 | – | 22 | .267 | 21 | – | 29 | .420 |
† – Conference champion ‡ – Tournament champion y – Invited to the NCAA tournament As of June 23, 2025; Rankings from D1baseball

The 2025 TCU Horned Frogs baseball team represents Texas Christian University during the 2025 NCAA Division I baseball season. The Horned Frogs play their home games at Lupton Stadium as a member of the Big 12 Conference. They are led by head coach Kirk Saarloos, in his fourth year as head coach and 13th season at TCU.

== Previous season ==
The 2024 TCU Horned Frogs baseball team notched a 33-21 (14-16) record. They would be the 9th seed in the Big 12 tournament, where they would beat 4th seed West Virginia in the first round, would lose to the 1st seed Oklahoma in the Upper Second Round, but would go on and beat 6th seed Kansas State, but would go on and lose to the 7th seed Kansas in the 3rd Round and ending their tournament.

== Roster ==
2025 TCU Horned Frogs roster
| Pitchers | Catchers Infielders | Outfielders | Two Way Players |

=== Coaches ===
2025 TCU Horned Frogs baseball coaching staff
- Kirk Saarloos – Head coach – 13th season
- Bill Mosiello – Assistant coach – 1st season
- John DiLaura – Assistant coach – 7th season
- Dave Lawn – Assistant coach – 2nd season

Note: Season counter accounts for all stints at TCU.

=== Starters ===
Opening Night Lineup
| Pos. | No. | Player. | Year |
|---|---|---|---|
| LF | | | |
| CF | | | |
| SS | | | |
| DH | | | |
| 1B | | | |
| RF | | | |
| 3B | | | |
| C | | | |
| 2B | | | |

Weekend pitching rotation
| Day | No. | Player. | Year |
|---|---|---|---|
| Friday | | | |
| Saturday | | | |
| Sunday | | | |

== Schedule and results ==
2025 TCU Horned Frogs baseball game log (Overall: 39-20; Conference: 19-11); (Home: 22-7; Away: 14-9; Neutral: 3-4)
Regular season (37-17)
February (0-0)
(Home; 0-0; Away: 0-0)

| Date Time | Opponent | Rank | TV | Venue | Score | Win | Loss | Save | Attendance | Overall record | Big 12 record |

March (0-0)
(Home; 0-0; Away: 0-0)

| Date Time | Opponent | Rank | TV | Venue | Score | Win | Loss | Save | Attendance | Overall record | Big 12 record |

April (0-0)
(Home; 0-0; Away: 0-0)

| Date Time | Opponent | Rank | TV | Venue | Score | Win | Loss | Save | Attendance | Overall record | Big 12 record |

May (0-0)
(Home; 0-0; Away: 0-0)

| Date Time | Opponent | Rank | TV | Venue | Score | Win | Loss | Save | Attendance | Overall record | Big 12 record |

Postseason (2-3)
Big 12 Tournament (2-1)

| Date Time | Opponent | Rank | TV | Venue | Score | Win | Loss | Save | Attendance | Overall record | Tournament record |
|---|---|---|---|---|---|---|---|---|---|---|---|
| May 22nd 7:30 p.m. | vs (11) Houston (Quarterfinals) | (3) | ESPNU | Globe Life Field • Arlington, Texas | **W 7-1** | **Tommy LaPour (8-2)** | Chris Scinta (4-3) | — | 6,032 | 38-17 | 1-0 |
| May 23rd 7:30 p.m. | vs (2) Kansas (Semifinals) | (3) | ESPN+ | Globe Life Field • Arlington, Texas | **W 11-1**^{(8)} | **Louis Rodriguez (5-1)** | Cooper Moore (7-2) | — | 4,257 | 39-17 | 2-0 |
| May 24th 6:00 p.m. | vs (4) Arizona (Championship) | (3) | ESPNU | Globe Life Field • Arlington, Texas | **L 1−2**^{(10)} | Tony Pluta (2−0) | **Braeden Sloan (3−4)** | — | 5,126 | 39−18 | 2−1 |

NCAA tournament (0−2)

| Date Time | Opponent | Rank | TV | Venue | Score | Win | Loss | Save | Attendance | Overall record | NCAAT record |
|---|---|---|---|---|---|---|---|---|---|---|---|
| May 30th 2:00 p.m. | vs (3) USC | (2) No. 24 | ESPNU | Goss Stadium at Coleman Field • Corvallis, Oregon | **L** 1−13 | Aoki (6−4) | **Tommy LaPour** (8−3) | − | 4,064 | 39−19 | 0−1 |
| May 31st 2:00 p.m. | vs (1) No. 8 Oregon State | (2) No. 24 | ESPN+ | Goss Stadium at Goleman Field | **L** 2–7 | Whitney (6–3) | **Brassfield** (5–2) | Keljo (2) | 4,237 | 39–20 | 0–2 |

"#" represents ranking. All rankings from D1 Baseball Poll on the date of the contest.
"()" represents postseason seeding in the Big 10 Tournament or NCAA Regional, respectively.
Legend: = Win = Loss = Canceled Bold = TCU team member
* = Non-Conference Game
Schedule Source:

== Rankings ==
Ranking movements
| | Week | | | | | | | | | | | | | | | | | | |
| Poll | Pre | 1 | 2 | 3 | 4 | 5 | 6 | 7 | 8 | 9 | 10 | 11 | 12 | 13 | 14 | 15 | 16 | 17 | Final |
|---|---|---|---|---|---|---|---|---|---|---|---|---|---|---|---|---|---|---|---|
| Coaches' | | * | | | | | | | | | | | | | | | | | |
| Baseball America | | | | | | | | | | | | | | | | | | | |
| NCBWA† | | | | | | | | | | | | | | | | | | | |

† NCBWA ranks 30 teams in their preseason poll, but only ranks 25 teams weekly during the season.
* A new poll was not released for this week, so for comparison purposes, the previous week's ranking is inserted in this week's slot.
