= 2025 Oklahoma State Cowboys baseball team =

College Baseball Season

2025 Oklahoma State Cowboys baseball

Athens Regional, 2–2
- Conference: Big 12 Conference
- Record: 30–25 (15–12 Big 12)
- Head coach: Josh Holliday (13th season)
- Assistant coaches: Rob Walton (13th season); Mark Ginther (2nd season); Victor Romero (2nd season)
- Home stadium: O'Brate Stadium

2025 Big 12 Conference baseball standings
	Conf.				Overall
Team	W		L	PCT	W		L	PCT
No. 14 West Virginia ‍†‍‍^{y}	19	–	9	.679	44	–	16	.733
Kansas ‍‍‍^{y}	20	–	10	.667	43	–	17	.717
TCU ‍‍‍^{y}	19	–	11	.633	39	–	20	.661
No. 7 Arizona ‍‍‡‍^{y}	18	–	12	.600	44	–	21	.677
Arizona State ‍‍‍^{y}	18	–	12	.600	36	–	24	.600
Kansas State ‍‍‍^{y}	17	–	13	.567	32	–	26	.552
Oklahoma State ‍‍‍^{y}	15	–	12	.556	30	–	25	.545
Cincinnati ‍‍‍^{y}	16	–	14	.533	33	–	26	.559
Texas Tech ‍‍‍	13	–	17	.433	20	–	33	.377
Baylor ‍‍‍	13	–	17	.433	33	–	22	.600
Houston ‍‍‍	12	–	17	.414	30	–	25	.545
BYU ‍‍‍	10	–	20	.333	28	–	27	.509
UCF ‍‍‍	9	–	21	.300	29	–	26	.527
Utah ‍‍‍	8	–	22	.267	21	–	29	.420
† – Conference champion ‡ – Tournament champion y – Invited to the NCAA tournament As of June 23, 2025; Rankings from D1baseball

The 2025 Oklahoma State Cowboys baseball team represented Oklahoma State University during the 2025 NCAA Division I baseball season. The Cowboys played their home games at O'Brate Stadium as a member of the Big 12 Conference. They were led by head coach Josh Holliday, in his 13th season at Oklahoma State.

Oklahoma State entered the season as the defending Big 12 Conference baseball tournament champions. They finished in seventh place in the Big 12 regular season.

== Previous season ==
Oklahoma State came off a season that saw the Pokes win their fifth ever Big 12 tournament title, their first since 2019, and their 26th overall tournament championship including their tenure in the Big Eight and Missouri Valley conferences. The Pokes finished the 2024 season with a 37–16 overall record and a 19–9 record in Big 12 play. In the Big 12 tournament, Oklahoma State beat their in-state rivals, Oklahoma, 9–3 in the championship.

The Pokes were awarded with a top 16 overall seed in the NCAA Division I baseball tournament, which gave them the right to host a regional. In the Stillwater Regional, Oklahoma State lost in the regional final against Florida.

Outfielders Carson Benge and Zach Ehrhard were named to the All-Big 12 first team. Also named to the All-Big 12 first team were designated hitter Easton Carmichael and starting pitcher Brian Holiday. Infielder Colin Brueggemann, outfielder Nolan Schubart, and relief pitcher Robert Cranz were named to the All-Big 12 second time. Aidan Meola and Tommy Molsky were named Big-12 honorable mentions.

== Preseason ==
=== Coaches poll ===
The coaches poll was released on January 23, 2025. Oklahoma State was picked to win the Big 12.

Coaches' Poll
Predicted finish	Team	Points
1	Oklahoma State	163 (9)
2	Arizona	152 (4)
3	TCU	149 (1)
4	West Virginia	115
5	Texas Tech	111
6	Arizona State	96
7	UCF	93
8	Kansas State	88
9	Kansas	85
10	Cincinnati	73
11	Houston	45
12	Utah	44
13	Baylor	39
14	BYU	21

== Personnel ==
=== Roster ===
2025 Oklahoma State Cowboys baseball team
Players
Coaches

#	Pos.	Name	B/T	Height	Weight	Year	Home town
1	INF	Brock Thompson	L/R	6 ft 0 in (1.83 m)	181 lb (82 kg)	Fr	(California) Bakersfield
2	INF	Aidan Meola	R/R	6 ft 2 in (1.88 m)	210 lb (95 kg)	Sr	(Florida) Palm Beach Gardens
3	OF	Donovan LaSalle	R/R	6 ft 2 in (1.88 m)	195 lb (88 kg)	So	(Louisiana) Lake Charles
4	OF	Brayden Smith	L/R	6 ft 0 in (1.83 m)	190 lb (86 kg)	Jr	(Nebraska) Omaha
5	OF	Garrett Shull	S/R	6 ft 2 in (1.88 m)	205 lb (93 kg)	Fr	(Oklahoma) Enid
6	INF	Drew Culbertson	R/R	6 ft 0 in (1.83 m)	170 lb (77 kg)	So	(Indiana) Greenwood
7	INF	Avery Ortiz	S/S	5 ft 11 in (1.8 m)	186 lb (84 kg)	So	(Oklahoma) Tulsa
8	C	Ian Daugherty	R/R	6 ft 2 in (1.88 m)	212 lb (96 kg)	Sr	(Oklahoma) Kingfisher
10	OF	Nolan Schubart	L/R	6 ft 5 in (1.96 m)	223 lb (101 kg)	Jr	(Michigan) Durand
12	INF	Colin Brueggemann	L/R	6 ft 6 in (1.98 m)	240 lb (109 kg)	Sr	(Illinois) Smithton
13	OF	Kollin Ritchie	L/R	6 ft 2 in (1.88 m)	219 lb (99 kg)	So	(Oklahoma) Atoka
14	INF	Alex Conover	L/R	6 ft 4 in (1.93 m)	195 lb (88 kg)	So	(Oklahoma) Tuttle
15	LHP	Harrison Bodendorf	R/L	6 ft 5 in (1.96 m)	186 lb (84 kg)	Jr	(California) Temecula
16	LHP	Ethan Lund	R/L	6 ft 6 in (1.98 m)	205 lb (93 kg)	Fr	(Indiana) Fishers
17	OF	Elijah Alexander	R/R	6 ft 2 in (1.88 m)	195 lb (88 kg)	Jr	(Oklahoma) Moore
18	INF	Beau Sylvester	R/R	6 ft 0 in (1.83 m)	201 lb (91 kg)	So	(Hawaii) Kailua
19	RHP	Stormy Rhodes	R/R	6 ft 4 in (1.93 m)	185 lb (84 kg)	Fr	(Texas) Kerrville
22	RHP	Gabe Davis	R/R	6 ft 9 in (2.06 m)	217 lb (98 kg)	Jr	(Oklahoma) Choctaw
23	C	Jayson Jones	R/R	6 ft 2 in (1.88 m)	204 lb (93 kg)	Jr	(Texas) Savannah
24	LHP	Ryan Ure	R/L	6 ft 8 in (2.03 m)	235 lb (107 kg)	Jr	(Colorado) Eaton
25	C	Ben Reiland	L/R	5 ft 11 in (1.8 m)	170 lb (77 kg)	Fr	(California) Villa Park
26	RHP	Noah Wech	R/R	6 ft 1 in (1.85 m)	200 lb (91 kg)	Fr	(Wisconsin) Manitowoc
27	RHP	Matthew Brown	R/R	6 ft 5 in (1.96 m)	222 lb (101 kg)	Fr	(Ontario) Carlisle
28	LHP	Brennan Phillips	L/L	6 ft 1 in (1.85 m)	189 lb (86 kg)	Jr	(Oklahoma) Owasso
30	INF	Braylon Brooks	R/R	5 ft 9 in (1.75 m)	180 lb (82 kg)	Fr	(Oklahoma) Tuttle
32	LHP	Drew Blake	L/L	6 ft 2 in (1.88 m)	194 lb (88 kg)	Jr	(Oklahoma) Stillwater
33	RHP	Sean Youngerman	R/R	6 ft 3 in (1.91 m)	225 lb (102 kg)	Jr	(California) Valencia
34	C	Charlie Carter	R/R	6 ft 3 in (1.91 m)	201 lb (91 kg)	So	(Arkansas) Little Rock
35	RHP	Jake Kennedy	R/R	6 ft 2 in (1.88 m)	190 lb (86 kg)	So	(Oklahoma) Hennessey
38	C	Thomas Lieb	R/R	5 ft 11 in (1.8 m)	192 lb (87 kg)	Fr	(California) Shadow Hills
39	RHP	Brex Caldwell	L/R	6 ft 2 in (1.88 m)	220 lb (100 kg)	Fr	(Oklahoma) Shady Point
40	LHP	Cale Sudderth	L/L	6 ft 3 in (1.91 m)	225 lb (102 kg)	Fr	(Oklahoma) Ardmore
41	RHP	Kash Ferris	R/R	6 ft 2 in (1.88 m)	200 lb (91 kg)	Fr	(Oklahoma) Midwest City
42	RHP	Jett Hope	R/R	6 ft 4 in (1.93 m)	205 lb (93 kg)	Fr	(Oklahoma) Bixby
44	RHP	Tommy Allman	R/R	6 ft 2 in (1.88 m)	195 lb (88 kg)	Sr	(Michigan) Farmington Hills
45	RHP	Landry Kyle	R/R	6 ft 3 in (1.91 m)	210 lb (95 kg)	Sr	Oklahoma City
48	RHP	Aaron Weber	R/R	6 ft 5 in (1.96 m)	223 lb (101 kg)	Sr	(Oklahoma) Edmond
52	RHP	Blake Julius	R/R	6 ft 6 in (1.98 m)	215 lb (98 kg)	Fr	(Texas) Mansfield
53	RHP	Bowen Bridges	R/R	6 ft 1 in (1.85 m)	206 lb (93 kg)	Jr	(Oklahoma) Edmond
56	LHP	Kyle Bade	L/L	5 ft 10 in (1.78 m)	170 lb (77 kg)	So	(Texas) Plano
66	RHP	Mario Pesca	R/R	6 ft 8 in (2.03 m)	275 lb (125 kg)	Jr	(New York (state)) The Bronx, NY
77	RHP	Hunter Watkins	R/R	6 ft 9 in (2.06 m)	233 lb (106 kg)	So	(California) Simi Valley

Head coach

Josh Holliday

Assistant coach(es)

Rob Walton
Mark Ginther
Victor Romero

Legend

- (C) Team captain
- (S) Suspended
- (I) Ineligible
- Injured
- Current redshirt

Roster
Last update: December 8, 2024

=== Coaching staff ===
2025 Oklahoma State Cowboys baseball coaching staff
Name	Position	Seasons at OSU	Alma mater
Josh Holliday	Head coach	13	Oklahoma State University (1999)
Rob Walton	Pitching coach	13	Oklahoma State University (1986)
Mark Ginther	Assistant coach	2	Oklahoma State University (2012)
Victor Romero	Assistant coach	2	Oklahoma State University (2013)

== Offseason ==
=== Departures ===
Offseason departures
Name	Number	Pos.	Height	Weight	Year	Hometown	Notes

==== Outgoing transfers ====
Outgoing transfers
Name	Number	Pos.	Height	Weight	Hometown	Year	New school	Source
Max Galvin	no	OF	height	weight	Coral Gables, FL	Junior	Miami (FL)	
Cole Johnson	no	RHP	height	weight	Gunnison, UT	Freshman	Austin Peay	
Janzen Keisel	no	RHP	height	weight	hometown	Junior	school	
Max Knight	no	RHP	height	weight	Bixby, OK	Freshman	Missouri State	
Austin Lemon	no	OF	height	weight	Oklahoma City, OK	Freshman	Villanova	
Kyler Proctor	no	INF	height	weight	Silo, OK	Freshman	Austin Peay	
Dominick Reid	no	RHP	6 ft 3 in (1.91 m)	201 pounds (91 kg)	Little Elm, TX	Sophomore	Abilene Christian	
Weston Rouse	no	LHP	6 ft 5 in (1.96 m)	238 pounds (108 kg)	Fort Gibson, OK	Freshman	Oral Roberts	
Addison Smith	no	INF	6 ft 0 in (1.83 m)	185 pounds (84 kg)	Liberty, MO	Freshman	Sam Houston State	
Tate Smith	no	RHP	6 ft 5 in (1.96 m)	215 pounds (98 kg)	Greeley, CO	Freshman	Sam Houston State	

==== 2024 MLB draft ====
Round	Pick	Overall pick	Player	Position	MLB team	Source

=== Acquisitions ===
==== Incoming transfers ====
Incoming transfers
Name	Number	Pos.	Height	Weight	Hometown	Year	Previous school	Source
Brayden Smith	4	U	6 ft 0 in (1.83 m)	190 pounds (86 kg)	Omaha, NE	Junior	Iowa Western (Note: Junior college)	
Drew Culbertson	6	INF	6 ft 0 in (1.83 m)	170 pounds (77 kg)	Greenwood, IN	Sophomore	Missouri	
Alex Conover	14	INF/OF	6 ft 4 in (1.93 m)	195 pounds (88 kg)	Tuttle, OK	Sophomore	Cowley	
Harrison Bodendorf	15	LHP	6 ft 5 in (1.96 m)	186 pounds (84 kg)	Temecula, CA	Junior	Hawaii	
Elijah Alexander	17	INF/OF	6 ft 2 in (1.88 m)	195 pounds (88 kg)	Moore, OK	Junior	Connors State	
Jayson Jones	23	INF/OF	6 ft 2 in (1.88 m)	204 pounds (93 kg)	Savannah, TX	Junior	Arkansas	
Sean Youngerman	33	RHP	6 ft 3 in (1.91 m)	225 pounds (102 kg)	Valencia, CA	Junior	Westmont	
Tommy Allman	44	RHP	6 ft 2 in (1.88 m)	195 pounds (88 kg)	Farmington Hills, Michigan	Senior	Jacksonville	
Mario Pesca	66	RHP	6 ft 8 in (2.03 m)	225 pounds (102 kg)	The Bronx, New York	Junior	St. John's	
Hunter Watkins	77	RHP	6 ft 9 in (2.06 m)	240 pounds (110 kg)	Simi Valley, California	Sophomore	Grand Canyon	

==== Incoming recruits ====
2024 Oklahoma State Recruits
Name	Number	B/T	Pos.	Height	Weight	Hometown	High School	Source

== Game log ==
2025 Oklahoma State Cowboys baseball game log (30–25)
Regular season (27–22)

February (4–4)
Date	TV	Opponent	Rank	Stadium	Score	Win	Loss	Save	Attendance	Overall	B12	Source
Shriners Children's College Showdown
February 14	FloBaseball	vs. No. 15 Clemson*	No. 17	Globe Life Field; Arlington, TX	**L** 5–6	Dvorsky (1–0)	**Wech** (0–1)	Mahlstedt (1)	8,344	0–1	—	Report
February 15	FloBaseball	vs. Louisville*	No. 17	Globe Life Field	**W** 12–3	**Bodendorf** (1–0)	Detmers (0–1)	None	13,289	1–1	—	Report
February 16	FloBaseball	vs. No. 19 Texas*	No. 17	Globe Life Field	**L** 8–14	Rerick (1–0)	**Wech** (0–2)	None	10,138	1–2		Report
February 18		vs. Texas State*	No. 19	Globe Life Field	**L** 4–2	Dudley (2–0)	**Blake** (0–1)	Laws (3)	821	1–3		Report
February 23	ESPN+	UT Arlington*	No. 19	O'Brate Stadium; Stillwater, OK	**W** 19–4	**Bodendorf** (2–0)	Dygert (1–1)	None	4,935	2–3		Report
February 24	ESPN+	UT Arlington*		O'Brate Stadium	**W** 10–4	**Watkins** (1–0)	Robb (1–1)	None	4,380	3–3		Report
February 26		vs. Abilene Christian*		La Moderna Field; Cleburne, TX	**W** 6–0	**Ure** (1–0)	Benson (0–1)	None	392	4–3		Report
Astros Foundation College Classic
February 28	MLB.tv	No. 3 Tennessee*		Daikin Park; Houston, TX	**L** 2–5	Loy (1–0)	**Davis** (0–1)	Snead (1)		4–4		Report

March (8–9)
Date	TV	Opponent	Rank	Stadium	Score	Win	Loss	Save	Attendance	Overall	B12	Source
Astros Foundation College Classic
March 1	MLB.tv	vs. No. 1 Texas A&M*		Daikin Park	**W** 4–0	**Bodendorf** (3–0)	Lamkin (0–1)	None	16,226	5–4		Report
March 2	MLB.tv	vs. No. 18 Mississippi State*		Daikin Park	**W** 9–7	**Watkins** (2–0)	Simmons (2–1)	**Youngerman** (1)		6–4		Report
March 4	ESPN+	Winthrop*	No. 25	O'Brate Stadium	**W** 3–2	**Blake** (1–1)	Hall (0–2)	**Youngerman** (2)	4,527	7–4		Report
March 5	ESPN+	Winthrop*	No. 25	O'Brate Stadium	**L** 3–9	Wilson (1–0)	**Wech** (0–3)	None	3,945	7–5		Report
March 7	ESPN+	Illinois State*	No. 25	O'Brate Stadium	**L** 6–12	Donnison (1–1)	**Davis** (0–2)	Harper (1)	5,273	7–6		Report
March 9 (DH 1)	ESPN+	Illinois State*	No. 25	O'Brate Stadium	**W** 16–1^{7}	**Anderson** (4–0)	Monke (1–2)	None		8–6		Report
March 9 (DH 2)	ESPN+	Illinois State*	No. 25	O'Brate Stadium	**W** 18–1^{7}	**Watkins** (3–0)	Weaver (0–3)	None	4,442	9–6		Report
March 11	ESPN+	at No. 20 Dallas Baptist*		Horner Ballpark; Dallas, TX	**L** 7–8^{11}	Todd (1–0)	**Rhodes** (0–1)	None	1,323	9–7		Report
March 15	B12N+/ESPN+	West Virginia		O'Brate Stadium	Game canceled							
March 15	B12N+	West Virginia		O'Brate Stadium	Game canceled							
March 16	B12N+	West Virginia		O'Brate Stadium	**L** 6–8	Meyer (4–0)	**Ure** (1–1)	None	4,550	9–8		Report
March 18	ESPN+	North Dakota State*		O'Brate Stadium	**W** 9–1	**Pesca** (1–0)	Shupe (0–2)	None	4,491	10–8		Report
March 19	ESPN+	North Dakota State*		O'Brate Stadium	Game canceled							
March 21	ESPN+	at Utah		Smith's Ballpark; Salt Lake City, UT	**L** 0–11	Mcanelly (2–1)	**Watkins** (3–1)	None	1,037	10–9	0–2	Report
March 22	ESPN+	at Utah		Smith's Ballpark	**W** 5–4	"Bodendorf' (5–0)	Jones (2–2)	**Youngerman** (3)	1,359	11–9	1–2	Report
March 23	ESPN+	at Utah		Smith's Ballpark	**L** 3–12	Boesen (2–1)	**Ure** (1–2)	Jones (1)	1,501	11–10	1–3	Report
March 25	ESPN+	Wichita State*		O'Brate Stadium	**W** 9–5	**Pesca** (2–0)	Arnett (0–1)	**Youngerman** (4)	4,743	12–10		Report
March 28	B12N+	at Kansas		Hoglund Ballpark; Lawrence, KS	**L** 2–5	Voegele (4–2)	**Bodendorf** (5–1)	Lin (1)	2,660	12–11	1–4	Report
March 29	B12N+	at Kansas		Hoglund Ballpark	**L** 11–12^{11}	Breckheimer (2–0)	**Youngerman** (0–1)	None	2,307	12–12	1–5	Report
March 30	B12N+	at Kansas		Hoglund Ballpark	**L** 2–11	Moore (2–0)	**Ure** (1–3)	None	1,019	12–13	1–6	Report

April (7–7)
Date	TV	Opponent	Rank	Stadium	Score	Win	Loss	Save	Attendance	Overall	B12	Source
April 1	ESPN+	at Missouri State*		Hammons Field; Springfield, MO	**L** 8–10	Slater (1–1)	**Hope** (0–1)	None	904	12–14		Report
April 4	ESPN+	No. 22 Kansas State		O'Brate Stadium	**W** 4–3	**Bodendorf** (6–1)	Frost (0–1)	**Watkins** (1)	4,942	13–14	2–6	Report
April 6 (DH 1)	ESPN+	No. 22 Kansas State		O'Brate Stadium	**W** 7–0	**Youngerman** (1–1)	Quevedo (4–1)	None		14–14	3–6	Report
April 6 (DH 2)	ESPN+	No. 22 Kansas State		O'Brate Stadium	**W** 10–2	**Watkins** (4–1)	Sheffield (4–3)	None	4,816	15–14	4–6	Report
April 8	ESPN+	Oral Roberts*		O'Brate Stadium	**L** 6–10	Johnson (1–2)	**Drew** (1–2)	None	4,922	15–15		Report
April 11	B12N+	at No. 24 Arizona		Hi Corbett Field; Tucson, AZ	**W** 4–2^{10}	**Bodendorf** (3–1)	Hintz (6–2)	None	3,339	16–15	5–6	Report
April 12	B12N+	at No. 24 Arizona		Hi Corbett Field	**L** 1–5	Kramkowski (5–3)	**Pesca** (2–1)	Pluta (7)	4,395	16–16	5–7	Report
April 13	B12N+	at No. 24 Arizona		Hi Corbett Field	**L** 4–5	Hicks (4–0)	**Wech** (0–4)	None	2,497	16–17	5–8	Report
Bedlam Series
April 15	ESPN2	No. 18 Oklahoma*		O'Brate Stadium	**L** 1–11^{8}	Hitt (1–0)	**Ure** (1–4)	None	6,810	16–18		Report
April 18	ESPN+	Houston		O'Brate Stadium	**L** 4–7	Jean (4–1)	**Watkins** (4–2)	None	4,301	16–19	5–9	Report
April 19	ESPN+	Houston		O'Brate Stadium	Game canceled							
April 20	ESPN+	Houston		O'Brate Stadium	**W** 9–1^{4.5}	'**Pesca** (3–1)	Fuller (0–2)	None	3,909	17–19	6–9	Report
April 22	ESPN+	Dallas Baptist*		O'Brate Stadium	**W** 16–4^{7}	**Watkins** (5–2)	Jenkins (5–1)	None	5,097	18–19		Report
April 25	ESPN+	at Cincinnati		UC Baseball Stadium; Cincinnati, OH	**L** 0–4	O'Connor (2–2)	**Pesca** (3–2)	None	700	18–20	6–10	Report
April 26	ESPN+	at Cincinnati		UC Baseball Stadium	**L** 4–11	Buczkowski (2–0)	**Watkins** (5–3)	Mitchelle (3)	1,122	18–21	6–11	Report
April 27	ESPN+	at Cincinnati		UC Baseball Stadium	**W** 8–1	**Youngerman** (2–1)	Marsh (3–4)	None	1,183	19–21	7–11	Report
April 29	SLN	at Oral Roberts*		J. L. Johnson Stadium; Tulsa, OK	Game canceled							

May (8–1)
Date	TV	Opponent	Rank	Stadium	Score	Win	Loss	Save	Attendance	Overall	B12	Source
May 2	ESPN+	UCF		O'Brate Stadium	**W** 12–0	**Bodendorf** (8–1)	Walker (0–2)	None	4,323	20–21	8–11	Report
May 3	ESPN+	UCF		Fred Handler Park	**W** 3–1	**Pesca** (4–2)	Sandefer (2–3)	**Davis** (1)	4,633	21–21	9–11	Report
May 4	ESPN+	UCF		Fred Handler Park	**W** 10–6	**Youngerman** (3–1)	Sauser (3–2)	**Brown** (1)	4,312	22–21	10–11	Report
May 9	ESPN+	at Baylor		Baylor Ballpark; Waco, TX	**W** 7–2	**Bodendorf** (9–1)	Green (0–2)	None	2,240	23–21	11–11	Report
May 10	ESPN+	at Baylor		Baylor Ballpark	**W** 4–0	**Pesca** (5–2)	Calder (3–6)	None	2,077	24–21	12–11	Report
May 11	ESPN+	at Baylor		Baylor Ballpark	**L** 4–5^{10}	Craig (3–0)	**Watkins** (5–4)	None	1,861	24–22	12–12	Report
May 15	ESPN+	Arizona State		O'Brate Stadium	**W** 6–2	**Bodendorf** (10–1)	Jacobs (3–3)	None	4,364	25–22	13–12	Report
May 16	ESPN+	Arizona State		O'Brate Stadium	**W** 9–6	**Pesca** (6–2)	Martinez (6–3)	None	4,793	26–22	14–12	Report
May 17	ESPN+	Arizona State		O'Brate Stadium	**W** 7–4	**Ure** (2–4)	Carlon (3–1)	**Davis** (2)	4,648	27–22	15–12	Report

Postseason (3–3)

Big 12 tournament (1–1)
Date	TV	Opponent	Rank	Stadium	Score	Win	Loss	Save	Attendance	Overall	B12T Record	Source
May 21	ESPNU	vs. (10) Baylor	(7)	Globe Life Field; Arlington, TX	**W** 4–3	**Pesca** (7–2)	Davenport (4–2)	**Davis** (3)		28–22	1–0	Report
May 22	ESPNU	vs. (2) Kansas	(7)	Globe Life Field; Arlington, TX	**L** 6–7	Breckheimer (5–0)	**Davis** (0–3)	None	6,032	28–23	1–1	Report

Athens Regional (2–2)
Date	TV	Opponent	Rank	Stadium	Score	Win	Loss	Save	Attendance	Overall	NCAA record	Source
May 30	ESPN2	vs. (2) Duke	(3)	Foley Field; Athens, GA	**L** 5–12	Proksch (3–3)	**Pesca** (7–3)	None	2,800	28–24	0–1	Report
May 31	ESPNU	vs. (4) Binghamton	(3)	Foley Field	**W** 13–5	**Rhodes** (1–1)	Tarsia (4–4)	None	2,950	29–24	1–1	Report
June 1	ESPN2	at No. 10 (1) Georgia	(3)	Foley Field	**W** 11–9	**Brown** (1–0)	Harris (3–1)	None	3,120	30–24	2–1	Report
June 1	ESPN+	at (2) Duke	(3)	Foley Field	**L** 2–3	Easterly (9–2)	**Ure** (2–5)	None	2,831	30–25	2–2	Report

Legend: = Win = Loss = Canceled
Bold = Oklahoma State team member * Non-conference game
Rankings are based on the team's current ranking in the D1Baseball poll.

=== Athens Regional ===
Athens Regional Teams
(1) Georgia Bulldogs	(2) Duke Blue Devils	(3) Oklahoma State Cowboys	(4) Binghamton Bearcats

First Round
**1**	**Georgia**	**20**
4	Binghamton	4
3	Oklahoma State	5
**2**	**Duke**	**12**
Lower round 1
4	Binghamton	5
**3**	**Oklahoma State**	**13**

Semi-Finals
1	Georgia	3
**2**	**Duke**	**6**
Lower final
1	Georgia	9
**3**	**Oklahoma State**	**11**

Finals
**2**	**Duke**	**3**	–
3	Oklahoma State	2	–

Athens Regional Round 1
(2) Duke Blue Devils	vs.	(3) Oklahoma State Cowboys

May 30, 2025, 6:00 pm (EST) at Foley Field in Athens, Georgia
Team	1	2	3	4	5	6	7	8	9	R	H	E
(3) Oklahoma State	0	0	0	0	1	1	0	3	0	**5**	**6**	**1**
**(2) Duke**	0	3	6	0	3	0	0	0	X	**12**	**12**	**0**
WP: Owen Proksch (3–3) LP: Mario Pesca (7–3); Home runs: OKST: Kollin Ritchie (11), Garrett Shull (2), Ian Daugherty (6), Brock Thompson (7); DUKE: Ben Miller (19), Tyler Albright (10), Jake Berger (7); Attendance: 2,800

Athens Regional Lower Round 1
(4) Binghamton Bearcats	vs.	(3) Oklahoma State Cowboys

May 31, 2025, 12:00 pm (EST) at Foley Field in Athens, Georgia
Team	1	2	3	4	5	6	7	8	9	R	H	E
(4) Binghamton	0	1	0	0	3	0	1	0	0	**5**	**12**	**2**
**(3) Oklahoma State**	2	0	3	3	2	0	0	3	X	**13**	**18**	**1**
WP: Stormy Rhodes (1–1) LP: Hayden Tarsia (4–4); Home runs: BING: Devan Bade (12, 13), Freddy Forgione (15); OKST: Kollin Ritchie (12, 13), Colin Brueggemann (15), Ian Daugherty (7), Avery Ortiz (3), Nolan Schubart (18), Alex Conover (5); Attendance: 2,950

Athens Regional Lower final
(1) Georgia Bulldogs	vs.	(3) Oklahoma State Cowboys

June 1, 2025, 12:00 pm (EST) at Foley Field in Athens, Georgia
Team	1	2	3	4	5	6	7	8	9	R	H	E
(1) Georgia	0	0	5	1	1	0	1	1	0	**9**	**11**	**1**
**(3) Oklahoma State**	1	2	0	0	4	0	0	0	4	**11**	**11**	**1**
WP: Matthew Brown (1–0) LP: Zach Harris (3–1); Home runs: UGA: Slate Alford (2), Christian Adams (2); OKST: Nolan Schubart (19), Kollin Ritchie (14), Alex Conover (6), Brock Thompson (7); Attendance: 3,120

Athens Regional Finals
(2) Duke Blue Devils	vs.	(3) Oklahoma State Cowboys

June 1, 2025, 6:00 pm (EST) at Foley Field in Athens, Georgia
Team	1	2	3	4	5	6	7	8	9	R	H	E
(3) Oklahoma State	0	0	0	2	0	0	0	0	0	**2**	**6**	**0**
**(2) Duke**	0	0	0	0	0	0	0	3	X	**3**	**9**	**0**
WP: Reid Easterly (9–2) LP: Ryan Ure (2–5); Home runs: OKST: Kollin Ritchie (15); DUKE: AJ Gracia (14); Attendance: 2,831

== Tournaments ==
=== Big 12 tournament ===
The Big 12 tournament was held May 21–24, 2025 at Globe Life Field in Arlington, Texas.

=== NCAA tournament ===
The NCAA tournament was played from May 29–June 23, 2025.

== Rankings ==
Ranking movements Legend: ██ Increase in ranking ██ Decrease in ranking — = Not ranked RV = Received votes
	Week																		
Poll	Pre	1	2	3	4	5	6	7	8	9	10	11	12	13	14	15	16	17	Final
Coaches'	17	17*	25	RV	RV	RV	—	—	—	—	—	—	—	—	RV				
Baseball America	13	17	16	14	—	—	—	—	—	—	—	—	—	—	—				
NCBWA†	18	RV	RV	RV	RV	RV	—	—	—	—	—	—	—	—	—				
D1Baseball	17	19	—	25	—	—	—	—	—	—	—	—	—	—	—				
Perfect Game	25	—	—	RV	—	—	—	—	—	—	—	—	—	—	—				

† NCBWA ranks 30 teams in their preseason poll, but only ranks 25 teams weekly during the season.
* A new poll was not released for this week, so for comparison purposes, the previous week's ranking is inserted in this week's slot.
