= 2025 Cincinnati Bearcats baseball team =

American college baseball season

2025 Cincinnati Bearcats baseball

Knoxville Regional, 1–2
- Conference: Big 12 Conference
- Record: 33–26 (16–14 Big 12)
- Head coach: Jordan Bischel (2nd season)
- Assistant coaches: Kyle Pettoruto (2nd season); Tayler Sheriff (2nd season); Tom Winske (2nd season)
- Home stadium: UC Baseball Stadium

2025 Big 12 Conference baseball standings
	Conf.				Overall
Team	W		L	PCT	W		L	PCT
No. 14 West Virginia ‍†‍‍^{y}	19	–	9	.679	44	–	16	.733
Kansas ‍‍‍^{y}	20	–	10	.667	43	–	17	.717
TCU ‍‍‍^{y}	19	–	11	.633	39	–	20	.661
No. 7 Arizona ‍‍‡‍^{y}	18	–	12	.600	44	–	21	.677
Arizona State ‍‍‍^{y}	18	–	12	.600	36	–	24	.600
Kansas State ‍‍‍^{y}	17	–	13	.567	32	–	26	.552
Oklahoma State ‍‍‍^{y}	15	–	12	.556	30	–	25	.545
Cincinnati ‍‍‍^{y}	16	–	14	.533	33	–	26	.559
Texas Tech ‍‍‍	13	–	17	.433	20	–	33	.377
Baylor ‍‍‍	13	–	17	.433	33	–	22	.600
Houston ‍‍‍	12	–	17	.414	30	–	25	.545
BYU ‍‍‍	10	–	20	.333	28	–	27	.509
UCF ‍‍‍	9	–	21	.300	29	–	26	.527
Utah ‍‍‍	8	–	22	.267	21	–	29	.420
† – Conference champion ‡ – Tournament champion y – Invited to the NCAA tournament As of June 23, 2025; Rankings from D1baseball

The 2025 Cincinnati Bearcats baseball team represented the University of Cincinnati during the 2025 NCAA Division I baseball season. The Bearcats played their home games at UC Baseball Stadium as a member of the Big 12 Conference. They were led by head coach Jordan Bischel in his second season at Cincinnati.

== Previous season ==
In 2024, the Bearcats finished 5th in the Big 12 with a record of 32-25, 17-13 in conference play. As the 5th seed in the Big 12 tournament, they lost to 8th seeded UCF in 11 innings, won against 3rd seeded Texas, and lost to 10th seeded Texas Tech. They did not get accepted to the 2024 NCAA Tournament.

== Preseason ==
=== 2024 MLB draft ===
2024 Cincinnati Draft Class
Round	Pick	Overall pick	Player	Position	MLB team	Source
6	6	171	Josh Kross	3B	St. Louis Cardinals	

==== Big 12 Baseball Preseason Poll ====
The Big 12 Baseball Preseason Poll was released on January 23, 2025. Cincinnati was voted to finish tenth in the Big 12.

Big 12 Baseball Preseason Poll
Predicted finish	Team	Votes (1st place)
1	Oklahoma State	163 (9)
2	Arizona	152 (4)
3	TCU	149 (1)
4	West Virginia	115
5	Texas Tech	111
6	Arizona State	96
7	UCF	93
8	Kansas State	88
9	Kansas	85
10	Cincinnati	73
11	Houston	45
12	Utah	44
13	Baylor	39
14	BYU	21

==== Preseason Big 12 awards and honors ====
Big 12 Preseason All-Big 12
Player	Position
Kerrington Cross	INF
Christian Mitchelle	UTIL
Nathan Taylor	SP

== Personnel ==
=== Roster ===
2025 Cincinnati Bearcats baseball team
Players
Coaches

#	Pos.	Name	B/T	Height	Weight	Year	Home town
0	C	Parker McDaniels	R/R	6 ft 1 in (1.85 m)	215 lb (98 kg)	Fr	Delaware, OH
2	INF	Kerrington Cross	R/R	6 ft 0 in (1.83 m)	215 lb (98 kg)	RS Sr	Brownsburg, IN
3	C	Christian Mitchelle	R/R	5 ft 11 in (1.8 m)	200 lb (91 kg)	Jr	Romeoville, IL
4	OF	Donovan Ford	R/R	5 ft 8 in (1.73 m)	160 lb (73 kg)	Sr	Greenville, SC
5		Dawson Hokuf	L/R	6 ft 4 in (1.93 m)	218 lb (99 kg)	RS Sr	Edmond, OK
6	INF	Luke Sefcik	R/R	5 ft 10 in (1.78 m)	180 lb (82 kg)	RS Jr	Palos Heights, IL
7	C	Jack Natili	R/R	6 ft 3 in (1.91 m)	198 lb (90 kg)	So	Venetia, PA
8	INF	Lauden Brooks	R/R	5 ft 11 in (1.8 m)	195 lb (88 kg)	Sr	Cincinnati, OH
9	OF	Maxton Polad	R/R	6 ft 2 in (1.88 m)	220 lb (100 kg)	RS Jr	Frankfort, IL
10	RHP	Keegan Allen	R/R	5 ft 11 in (1.8 m)	190 lb (86 kg)	RS Jr	Rogers, AR
11	RHP	Nathan Taylor	L/R	6 ft 5 in (1.96 m)	230 lb (104 kg)	So	Amelia, OH
13		Brandon Scheurer	L/R	6 ft 1 in (1.85 m)	197 lb (89 kg)	RS Sr	Portland, MI
14	OF	Landyn Vidourek	L/R	6 ft 1 in (1.85 m)	192 lb (87 kg)	Jr	Hamilton, OH
15	C	Kory Klingenbeck	S/R	5 ft 10 in (1.78 m)	195 lb (88 kg)	RS Sr	Cincinnati, OH
16	RHP	Michael Conte	R/R	6 ft 3 in (1.91 m)	215 lb (98 kg)	Sr	Cincinnati, OH
17	RHP	Rodney Shultz	R/R	6 ft 1 in (1.85 m)	210 lb (95 kg)	Sr	Tyrone, PA
18	RHP	Max Bergmann	R/R	6 ft 3 in (1.91 m)	206 lb (93 kg)	RS Sr	Georgetown, IN
19	INF	Charlie Niehaus	R/R	5 ft 10 in (1.78 m)	178 lb (81 kg)	RS Fr	West Chester, OH
20	INF	Josh Ulery	R/R	5 ft 10 in (1.78 m)	185 lb (84 kg)	Sr	Latrobe, PA
21	UTL	Cal Sefcik	R/R	6 ft 0 in (1.83 m)	220 lb (100 kg)	So	Palos Heights, IL
22	OF	Louis Perona	L/R	6 ft 3 in (1.91 m)	203 lb (92 kg)	Sr	Chicago, IL
23	RHP	Brendin Oliver	R/R	6 ft 3 in (1.91 m)	192 lb (87 kg)	Fr	Mooresville, IN
24	LHP	Carter Earls	L/L	6 ft 4 in (1.93 m)	215 lb (98 kg)	RS Jr	Middletown, OH
25	UTL	Quinton Coats	R/R	6 ft 3 in (1.91 m)	225 lb (102 kg)	Fr	Olathe, KS
26	LHP	Chase Horst	L/L	5 ft 10 in (1.78 m)	185 lb (84 kg)	Jr	Lititz, PA
27	INF	Eric De Costa	R/R	6 ft 5 in (1.96 m)	225 lb (102 kg)	Fr	North Aurora, IL
28	C	Gavin Brewer	R/R	5 ft 11 in (1.8 m)	190 lb (86 kg)	Fr	Knoxville, TN
29	RHP	Carson Marsh	R/R	5 ft 10 in (1.78 m)	178 lb (81 kg)	So	West Chester, OH
30		Ryan Tyranski	L/R	6 ft 4 in (1.93 m)	195 lb (88 kg)	Fr	Birmingham, MI
31	RHP	Adam Buczkowski	R/R	6 ft 2 in (1.88 m)	205 lb (93 kg)	Fr	Carmel, IN
32	RHP	Tommy Boba	R/R	6 ft 2 in (1.88 m)	210 lb (95 kg)	Jr	Wheaton, IL
33	RHP	Bradley Coulter	R/R	6 ft 1 in (1.85 m)	189 lb (86 kg)	So	Taylorsville, KY
35	LHP	Ty Barnett	L/L	5 ft 11 in (1.8 m)	163 lb (74 kg)	Fr	Athens, TN
38	RHP	Joel Pineiro	R/R	6 ft 1 in (1.85 m)	202 lb (92 kg)	Jr	Miami, FL
40	LHP	Hudson Johnson	L/L	6 ft 1 in (1.85 m)	245 lb (111 kg)	Fr	Prior Lake, MN
41	LHP	Adam Mrakitsch	L/L	6 ft 0 in (1.83 m)	168 lb (76 kg)	Sr	Howell, MI
42	OF	Derrick Pitts	R/R	6 ft 2 in (1.88 m)	198 lb (90 kg)	Fr	St. Louis, MO
44		Tommy O'Connor	L/L	6 ft 3 in (1.91 m)	235 lb (107 kg)	Sr	Martinsville, IN
45	LHP	Brenden Garula	L/L	5 ft 11 in (1.8 m)	195 lb (88 kg)	Jr	Mason, OH
50	RHP	Bryce Koch	R/R	6 ft 5 in (1.96 m)	203 lb (92 kg)	Fr	Barrington, IL
51	LHP	Kellen O'Connor	L/L	5 ft 10 in (1.78 m)	185 lb (84 kg)	RS Sr	Portland, OR
55	RHP	Michael Fliss	R/R	6 ft 6 in (1.98 m)	220 lb (100 kg)	Fr	Indianapolis, IN

Head coach

Jordan Bischel

Assistant coach(es)

Kyle Pettoruto
Tayler Scheriff
Tom Winske

Legend

- (C) Team captain
- (S) Suspended
- (I) Ineligible
- Injured
- Current redshirt

Roster
Last update: April 1, 2025

==== Starters ====
Lineup
Pos.	No.	Player	Year
C	7	Jack Natili	Sophomore
1B/DH	5	Dawson Hokuf	RS-Senior
2B	8	Lauden Brooks	Senior
3B	2	Kerrington Cross	RS-Senior
SS	19	Charlie Niehaus	RS-Freshman
LF	21	Cal Sefcik	Sophomore
CF	4	Donovan Ford	Senior
RF	14	Landyn Vidourek	Junior
1B/DH	6	Rylan Galvan	Sophomore

Weekend pitching rotation
Day	No.	Player	Year
Friday	11	Nathan Taylor	Sophomore
Saturday	51	Kellen O’Connor	RS-Senior
Sunday	41	Adam Mrakitsch	Senior

== Schedule and results ==
2025 Cincinnati Bearcats baseball game log (33–26)
Regular season (31–23)
February (5–4)
(Away: 5–4)

Date	Opponent	Rank	TV	Venue	Score	Win	Loss	Save	Attendance	Overall record	Big 12 record
February 14	at No. 11 Duke*	—	ACCNX	Jack Coombs Field; Durham, NC	**W** 8–3	**Pineiro** (1–0)	Johnson (0–1)	—	746	1–0	–
February 15	at No. 11 Duke	—	ACCNX	Jack Coombs Field; Durham, NC	**L** 5–6 (12)	Barnett (1–0)	**Weaver** (0–1)	—	485	1–1	–
February 16	at No. 11 Duke	—	ACCNX	Jack Coombs Field; Durham, NC	**W** 19–5	**Johnson** (1–0)	Tallon (0–1)	—	659	2–1	–
February 18	Bowling Green*	No. 25	ESPN+	UC Baseball Stadium; Cincinnati, OH	Cancelled						
February 21	at UNLV*	No. 25	YouTube	Earl Wilson Stadium; Paradise, NV	**W** 6–0	**Marsh** (1–0)	Lane (0–1)	None	477	3–1	–
February 22	at UNLV*	No. 25	YouTube	Earl Wilson Stadium; Paradise, NV	**L** 4–5	Overbay (1–0)	**Mitchelle** (0–1)	None	688	3–2	–
February 23	at UNLV*	No. 25	YouTube	Earl Wilson Stadium; Paradise, NV	**W** 10–9	**Barnett** (1–1)	Dillow (0–1)	**Marsh** (1)	777	4–2	–
February 24	at UNLV*	No. 23	YouTube	Earl Wilson Stadium; Paradise, NV	**L** 6–7	Overbay (2–0)	**Pineiro** (0–1)	None	577	4–3	–
February 27	at UC San Diego*	No. 23	ESPN+	Triton Ballpark; La Jolla, CA	**L** 3–4	Hasegawa (2–0)	**Marsh (1–1)**	None	325	4–4	–
February 28	at UC San Diego*	No. 23	ESPN+	Triton Ballpark; La Jolla, CA	**W** 5–2	**Taylor** (1–0)	Dalquist (1–1)	**Johnson** (1)	460	5–4	–

March (11–7)
(Home; 11–2; Away: 0–5)

Date	Opponent	Rank	TV	Venue	Score	Win	Loss	Save	Attendance	Overall record	Big 12 record
March 1	at UC San Diego*	No. 23	ESPN+	Triton Ballpark; La Jolla, CA	**L** 2–8	Seid (1–0)	**Mrakitsch** (0–1)	None	330	5–5	–
March 2	at UC San Diego*	No. 23	ESPN+	Triton Ballpark; La Jolla, CA	**L** 0–5	Ries (1–0)	**Shultz** (0–1)	None	404	5–6	–
March 4	Toledo*	-	ESPN+	UC Baseball Stadium	**W** 7–5	**Johnson** (2–0)	Hughes (0–1)	**Mitchelle** (1)	937	6–6	–
March 7*	Canisius* (1)	-	ESPN+	UC Baseball Stadium	**W** 13–5	**Carson** (2–1)	Kutz (0–1)	None	354	7–6	–
March 7*	Canisius* (2)	-	ESPN+	UC Baseball Stadium	**W** 7–0	**Buczkowski** (1–0)	Albano (0–1)	None	500	8–6	–
March 8	Canisius*	-	ESPN+	UC Baseball Stadium	**W** 10–1	**Taylor** (2–0)	Morin (0–2)	None	576	9–6	–
March 9	Canisius*	-	ESPN+	UC Baseball Stadium	**W** 12–1 (7)	**Pineiro** (2–1)	Abbott (0–1)	None	786	10–6	–
March 11	Miami (OH)*	-	ESPN+	UC Baseball Stadium	**W** 12–3	**Johnson** (3–0)	Mastrian IV (0–3)	None	2,188	11–6	–
March 14	at Arizona	-	ESPN+	Hi Corbett Field; Tucson, AZ	**L** 3–8	Hintz (4–0)	**Bergmann** (0–1)	Hicks (1)	2,061	11–7	0–1
March 15	at Arizona	-	ESPN+	Hi Corbett Field; Tucson, AZ	**L** 2–14	Kramkowski (3–1)	**Barnett** (1–2)	None	2,660	11–8	0–2
March 16	at Arizona	-	ESPN+	Hi Corbett Field; Tucson, AZ	**L** 1–11(7)	Smith (1–1)	**Pineiro** (2–2)	None	2,428	11–9	0–3
March 21	BYU (1)	-	ESPN+	UC Baseball Stadium	**L** 5–7	Reiser (2–0)	**Johnson** (3–1)	Cushing (2)	250	11–10	0–4
March 21	BYU (2)	-	ESPN+	UC Baseball Stadium	**W** 5–4	**Taylor** (3–0)	Harris (1–1)	**Scheurer** (1)	765	12–10	1–4
March 22	BYU	-	ESPN+	UC Baseball Stadium	**L** 2–4	Sumner (3–1)	**Mrakitsch** (0–2)	Marx (1)	793	12–11	1–5
March 23	Butler*	-	ESPN+	UC Baseball Stadium	**Cancelled**						
March 25	No. 18 Louisville*	-	ESPN+	UC Baseball Stadium	**W** 12–2	**Bergmann** (1–1)	West (0–1)	None	1,107	13–11	–
March 28	UCF	-	ESPN+	UC Baseball Stadium	**W** 6–4	**Taylor** (4–0)	Sandefer (1–2)	**Scheurer** (2)	1,324	14–11	2–5
March 29	UCF	-	ESPN+	UC Baseball Stadium	**W** 7–6 (10)	**Horst** (1–0)	Bauer (0–1)	None	1,177	15–11	3–5
March 30	UCF	-	ESPN+	UC Baseball Stadium	**W** 10–7	**Johnson** (4–1)	Schoneboom (1–1)	**Scheurer** (3)	811	16–11	4-5

April (8–9)
(Home: 5–3; Away: 3–5; Neutral: 0–1)

Date	Opponent	Rank	TV	Venue	Score	Win	Loss	Save	Attendance	Overall record	Big 12 record
April 1	at Miami (OH)*	-	Chatterbox Sports	Hayden Park; Oxford, OH	**W** 6–4	**Marsh** (3–1)	Fulk (1–2)	**Mitchelle** (2)	414	17–11	–
April 4	at Texas Tech	-	ESPN+	Dan Law Field at Rip Griffin Park; Lubbock, TX	**W** 8–7 (12)	**Scheurer** (1–0)	Pirko (0–2)	None	3,198	18–11	5–5
April 6*	at Texas Tech (1)	-	ESPN+	Dan Law Field at Rip Griffin Park	**W** 8–1	**O'Connor** (1–0)	Bourdreau (1–2)	None	-	19–11	6–5
April 6*	at Texas Tech (2)	-	ESPN+	Dan Law Field at Rip Griffin Park	**L** 8–12	Crotchfelt (2–2)	**Johnson** (4–2)	None	3,642	19–12	6–6
Joe Nuxhall Classic
April 8	vs Wright State*	-	Chatterbox Sports	Prasco Park; Mason, OH	**L** 3–10	Lax (3–1)	**Mrakitsch** (0–3)	None	—	19–13	–
April 9	vs Miami (OH)*	-	Chatterbox Sports	Prasco Park	Cancelled						
April 11	Arizona State	-	ESPN+	UC Baseball Stadium	**W** 11–7	**Horst** (2–0)	Giblin (5–2)	None	781	20–13	7–6
April 12	Arizona State	-	ESPN+	UC Baseball Stadium	**L** 4–7	Martinez (4–2)	**O'Connor** (1–1)	Carlon (1)	1,115	20–14	7–7
April 13	Arizona State	-	ESPN+	UC Baseball Stadium	**W** 9–8 (10)	**Conte** (1–0)	Kelly (3–1)	None	588	21–14	8–7
April 15	Xavier*	-	ESPN+	UC Baseball Stadium	**L** 6–7	Hooker (2–5)	**Marsh** (3–2)	None	1,194	21–15	–
April 17	at No. 24 West Virginia	-	ESPN+	Kendrick Family Ballpark; Morgantown, WV	**L** 2–3	Meyer (7–1)	**Taylor** (4–1)	None	3,370	21–16	8–8
April 18	at No. 24 West Virginia	-	ESPN+	Kendrick Family Ballpark	**L** 4–6	Bassinger (4–0)	**O'Connor** (1–2)	Estridge (3)	4,289	21–17	8–9
April 19	at No. 24 West Virginia	-	ESPN+	Kendrick Family Ballpark	**L** 5–10	Kartsonas (4–1)	**Marsh** (3–3)	None	3,776	21–18	8–10
April 22	at Xavier*	-	FloCollege	J. Page Hayden Field; Cincinnati, OH	**L** 6–15	Chavana (3–1)	**Pineiro** (2–3)	None	408	21–19	–
April 23	Milwaukee*	-	ESPN+	UC Baseball Stadium	**W** 14–4 (8)	**Mrakitsch** (1–3)	Mulhern (0–1)	None	606	22–19	–
April 25	Oklahoma State	-	ESPN+	UC Baseball Stadium	**W** 4–0	**O'Connor** (2–2)	Pesca (3–2)	None	700	23–19	9–10
April 26	Oklahoma State	-	ESPN+	UC Baseball Stadium	**W** 11–4	**Buczkowski** (2–0)	Watkins (5–3)	**Mitchelle** (3)	1,122	24–19	10–10
April 27	Oklahoma State	-	ESPN+	UC Baseball Stadium	**L** 1–8	Youngerman (2–1)	**Marsh** (3–4)	None	1,183	24–20	10–11

May (7–3)
(Home; 2–1; Away: 5–2)

Date	Opponent	Rank	TV	Venue	Score	Win	Loss	Save	Attendance	Overall record	Big 12 record
May 2	at No. 25 Kansas	-	ESPN+	Hoglund Ballpark; Lawrence, KS	**W** 7–2	**Taylor** (5–1)	Voegele (6–4)	None	1,205	25–20	11–11
May 3	at No. 25 Kansas	-	ESPN+	Hoglund Ballpark	**W** 18–14 (10)	**Conte** (2–0)	Vetock (3–1)	None	1,278	26–20	12–11
May 4	at No. 25 Kansas	-	ESPN+	Hoglund Ballpark	**W** 13–4	**O'Connor** (3–2)	Trumper (4–1)	None	1,620	27–20	13–11
May 6	at Oral Roberts*	-	Summit League Network	J. L. Johnson Stadium; Tulsa, OK	**W** 10–2	**Scheurer** (2–0)	Johnson (1–4)	None	492	28–20	–
May 9	at TCU	-	ESPN+	Lupton Stadium; Fort Worth, TX	**L** 11–17	Rodriguez (3–1)	**Taylor** (5–2)	None	4,080	28–21	13–12
May 10	at TCU	-	ESPN+	Lupton Stadium	**L** 6–7	Stern (2–1)	**Conte** (2–1)	None	4,227	28–22	13–13
May 11	at TCU	-	ESPN+	Lupton Stadium	**W** 9–8	**Buczkowski** (3–0)	Eudy (1–1)	**Bergmann** (1)	2,744	29–22	14–13
May 13	Indiana*	-	ESPN+	UC Baseball Stadium	**Canceled due to forecasted inclement weather**						
May 15	Kansas State	-	ESPN+	UC Baseball Stadium	**W** 7–4	**Buczkowski** (4–0)	Ruhl (3–3)	**O'Connor** (1)	1,206	30–22	15–13
May 16	Kansas State	-	ESPN+	UC Baseball Stadium	**W** 7–0	**Scheurer** (3–0)	Quevedo (6–3)	None	909	31–22	16–13
May 17	Kansas State	-	ESPN+	UC Baseball Stadium	**L** 5–9	Butler (1–1)	**Shultz** (0–2)	None	1,065	31–23	16–14

Postseason (2–3)
Big 12 Tournament (1–1)

Date	Opponent	Seed	TV	Venue	Score	Win	Loss	Save	Attendance	Overall record	Big12T record
May 21	vs. (9) Texas Tech	(8)	ESPNU	Globe Life Field; Arlington, TX	**W** 6–5	**Taylor** (6–2)	Heuer (2–4)	**O'Connor** (2)	N/A	32–23	1–0
May 22	vs. (1) West Virginia	(8)	ESPN+	Globe Life Field; Arlington, TX	**L** 3–10	Kirn (5-2)	**Marsh** (3–5)	None	N/A	32–24	1–1

NCAA tournament (1–2)

Date	Opponent	Seed	TV	Venue	Score	Win	Loss	Save	Attendance	Overall record	NCAAT record
May 30	vs. (2) Wake Forest	(3)	ESPN+	Lindsey Nelson Stadium; Knoxville, TN	**W** 11–6	**Taylor** (7–2)	Morningstar (6–2)	None	5,416	33–24	1–0
May 31	(1) Tennessee	(3)	ESPN+	Lindsey Nelson Stadium; Knoxville, TN	**L** 6–10	Phillips (4-4)	**O'Connor** (3–3)	Arvidson (1)	6,235	33–25	1-1
June 1	vs. (2) Wake Forest	(3)	ACCN	Lindsey Nelson Stadium; Knoxville, TN	**L** 3-10	Dallas (5-1)	**Marsh** (3-6)	None	5,395	33–26	1-2

"#" represents ranking. All rankings from D1 Baseball Poll on the date of the contest.
"()" represents postseason seeding in the Big 12 Tournament or NCAA Regional, respectively.
= Win, = Loss, = Canceled/Postponed
Bold = **Cincinnati team member**
* = Non-Conference Game
Schedule Source:

=== NCAA Tournament ===
Hosted by Arkansas at Baum–Walker Stadium

Regional	Regional
**1**	**Arkansas**	**6**
4	North Dakota State	2
**1**	**Arkansas**	**12**
3	Creighton	1
**3**	**Creighton**	**11**
2	Kansas	4
Fayetteville Regional – Baum–Walker Stadium
**4**	**North Dakota State**	**4**
2	Kansas	3
4	North Dakota State	10
**3**	**Creighton**	**11**
**1**	**Tennessee**	**9**
4	Miami (OH)	2
**1**	**Tennessee**	**10**
3	Cincinnati	6
**3**	**Cincinnati**	**11**
2	Wake Forest	6
Knoxville Regional – Lindsey Nelson Stadium
4	Miami (OH)	13
**2**	**Wake Forest**	**14**
**2**	**Wake Forest**	**10**
3	Cincinnati	3

Regional Final
**1**	**Arkansas**	**8**	–
3	Creighton	3	–
**1**	**Tennessee**	6	**11**
2	Wake Forest	**7**	5

Super Regional; June 7–9
**3**	**Arkansas**	**4**	**11**	–
14	Tennessee	3	4	–

== Awards and honors ==
=== Big 12 awards and honors ===
Big 12 Weekly Honors
Honors	Player	Position	Date Awarded	Ref.
Big 12 Player of the Week	Kerrington Cross	INF	March 31, 2025	
Big 12 Player of the Week	Kerrington Cross	INF	May 5, 2025	
Big 12 Player and Newcomer of the Week	Jack Natili	C	May 12, 2025	

Big 12 Postseason Awards
Honors	Player	Position	Ref.
Big 12 Player of the Year & Big 12 First Team	Kerrington Cross^{*}	INF	
Big 12 Second Team	Jack Natili	C	
Big 12 All Freshman Team	Quinton Coats	INF	
Honorable Mentions	Kellen O'Connor	P	
Honorable Mentions	Nathan Taylor	P	
Honorable Mentions	Landyn Vidourek	OF	

^{*}Denotes Unanimous Selection

=== Final awards watchlists ===
Final award watchlists
Honors	Player	Position	Ref.
Golden Spikes Award	Kerrington Cross	INF	
Dick Howser Trophy	Kerrington Cross	INF	

=== NCAA All Tournament Team ===
2025 NCAA Knoxville Regional - All Tournament-Team
Player	Position	Ref.
Kerrington Cross	3B	
Donovan Ford	OF	

=== All Americans ===
All-American Honors
Player	Position	Perfect Game	ABCA/Rawlings
Kerrington Cross	INF	1st	

=== 2025 MLB draft ===
2025 Cincinnati Draft Class
Round	Pick	Overall pick	Player	Position	MLB Team	Source

== Rankings ==
Ranking movements Legend: ██ Increase in ranking ██ Decrease in ranking — = Not ranked RV = Received votes
	Week																			
Poll	Pre	1	2	3	4	5	6	7	8	9	10	11	12	13	14	15	16	17	18	Final
Coaches'	—	—*	RV	—	—	—	—	—	—	—	—	—	—	—	—					
Baseball America	—	—	—	—	—	—	—	—	—	—	—	—	—	—	—					
NCBWA†	—	—	RV	RV	RV	RV	—	—	—	—	—	—	—	—	—					
D1Baseball	—	25	23	—	—	—	—	—	—	—	—	—	—	—	—					
Perfect Game	—	—	—	—	—	—	—	—	—	—	—	—	—	—	—					

† NCBWA ranks 30 teams in their preseason poll, but only ranks 25 teams weekly during the season.
* A new poll was not released for this week, so for comparison purposes, the previous week's ranking is inserted in this week's slot.
