= 2025 UCF Knights baseball team =

College baseball season

2025 UCF Knights baseball
- Conference: Big 12 Conference
- Record: 29–26 (9–21 Big 12)
- Head coach: Rich Wallace (2nd season)
- Assistant coaches: Norberto Lopez; Drew Thomas; Ted Tom
- Home stadium: John Euliano Park

2025 Big 12 Conference baseball standings
	Conf.				Overall
Team	W		L	PCT	W		L	PCT
No. 14 West Virginia ‍†‍‍^{y}	19	–	9	.679	44	–	16	.733
Kansas ‍‍‍^{y}	20	–	10	.667	43	–	17	.717
TCU ‍‍‍^{y}	19	–	11	.633	39	–	20	.661
No. 7 Arizona ‍‍‡‍^{y}	18	–	12	.600	44	–	21	.677
Arizona State ‍‍‍^{y}	18	–	12	.600	36	–	24	.600
Kansas State ‍‍‍^{y}	17	–	13	.567	32	–	26	.552
Oklahoma State ‍‍‍^{y}	15	–	12	.556	30	–	25	.545
Cincinnati ‍‍‍^{y}	16	–	14	.533	33	–	26	.559
Texas Tech ‍‍‍	13	–	17	.433	20	–	33	.377
Baylor ‍‍‍	13	–	17	.433	33	–	22	.600
Houston ‍‍‍	12	–	17	.414	30	–	25	.545
BYU ‍‍‍	10	–	20	.333	28	–	27	.509
UCF ‍‍‍	9	–	21	.300	29	–	26	.527
Utah ‍‍‍	8	–	22	.267	21	–	29	.420
† – Conference champion ‡ – Tournament champion y – Invited to the NCAA tournament As of June 23, 2025; Rankings from D1baseball

The 2025 UCF Knights baseball team represented the University of Central Florida (UCF) in the sport of baseball during the 2025 college baseball season. The Knights competed as members of the Big 12 Conference. Home games were played at John Euliano Park on the university's main campus in Orlando, Florida. The team was coached by Rich Wallace, who was in his second season as UCF's head coach.

== Preseason ==
=== Big 12 coaches poll ===
The Big 12 Conference preseason poll was released on January 23, 2025, with the Knights predicted to finish in seventh place.

Coaches Poll
Rank	School (1st Place Votes)	Total
1	Oklahoma State (9)	163
2	Arizona (4)	152
3	TCU (1)	149
4	West Virginia	115
5	Texas Tech	111
6	Arizona State	96
7	UCF	93
8	Kansas State	88
9	Kansas	85
10	Cincinnati	73
11	Houston	45
12	Utah	44
13	Baylor	39
14	BYU	21

== Schedule ==
Legend
	UCF win
	UCF loss
	Postponement
**Bold**	UCF team member

2025 UCF Knights baseball game log (29–26)
Regular season (29–26)

February (6–3)
Date	Opponent	Stadium Site	Score	Win	Loss	Save	Attendance	Overall Record
February 14	Siena	John Euliano Park; Orlando, FL	**W** 13–4	**K. Schoneboom** (1–0)	M. Rowe (0–1)	None	2,074	1–0
February 15	Siena	John Euliano Park	**W** 11–0	**W. Hartley** (1–0)	T. Sausville (0–1)	None	2,249	2–0
February 16	Siena	John Euliano Park	**W** 16–1	**G. Siegel** (1–0)	N. Rodriguez (0–1)	None	1,726	3–0
February 20	Missouri	John Euliano Park	**W** 7–1	**M. Sauser** (1–0)	W. Libbert (0–1)	None	1,622	4–0
February 21	Bryant	John Euliano Park	**W** 7–6	**R. Sandefer** (1–0)	J. Vanesko (0–1)	None	1,833	5–0
February 22	Bryant	John Euliano Park	**W** 4–2	**K. Sosnowski** (1–0)	A. Slotter (0–1)	None	1,917	6–0
February 23	Bryant	John Euliano Park	**L** 3–5	B. Ey (1–0)	**G. Siegel** (1–1)	L. Chamberlain (1)	1,754	6–1
February 25	Florida Atlantic	John Euliano Park	**L** 3–4	M. Martzolf (3–0)	**C. Stanford** (0–1)	MJ Bollinger (2)	1,946	6–2
February 28	at South Florida	USF Baseball Stadium; Tampa, FL	**L** 3–13^{7}	C. Braun (2–0)	**D. Stagliano** (0–1)	None	1,453	6–3

March (11–7)
Date	Opponent	Stadium Site	Score	Win	Loss	Save	Attendance	Overall Record	Big 12 Record
March 1	at South Florida	USF Baseball Stadium	**W** 12–1^{7}	**W. Hartley** (2–0)	J. Hill (0–2)	None	1,381	7–3	–
March 2	at South Florida	USF Baseball Stadium	**W** 12–2^{7}	**D. Castellano** (1–0)	J. Nedrow (2–1)	None	1,298	8–3	–
March 4	No. 7 Florida	John Euliano Park	**W** 13–3	**D. Castellano** (2–0)	M. Jenkins (0–1)	None	4,204	9–3	–
March 7	Monmouth	John Euliano Park	**W** 17–1	**K. Sosnowski** (2–0)	K. Opanel (0–1)	None	1,820	10–3	–
March 8	Monmouth	John Euliano Park	**W** 18–3	**W. Hartley** (3–0)	T. Kent (1–3)	None	2,211	11–3	–
March 9	Monmouth	John Euliano Park	**W** 8–0	**D. Stagliano** (1–1)	JD Greeley (0–3)	None	1,651	12–3	–
March 11	Miami	John Euliano Park	**W** 14–4	**D. Castellano** (3–0)	A. Giroux (2–1)	None	3,015	13–3	–
March 13	at BYU	Miller Park; Provo, UT	**W** 9–8	**D. Castellano** (4–0)	N. Flickin (2–1)	**A. Galvan** (1)	1,359	14–3	1–0
March 14	at BYU	Miller Park	**L** 7–8^{10}	A. Johnson (1–0)	**R. Sandefer** (1–1)	None	1,443	14–4	1–1
March 15	at BYU	Miller Park	**W** 9–8	**D. Castellano** (5–0)	G. Sumner (2–1)	**A. Smith** (1)	1,791	15–4	2–1
March 18	at Stetson	Melching Field at Conrad Park; DeLand, FL	**W** 3–0	**G. Siegel** (2–1)	E. Phillips (0–1)	**R. Sandefer** (1)	2,150	16–4	–
March 21	Houston	John Euliano Park	**L** 5–7	C. Scinta (1–0)	**D. Castellano** (5–1)	A. Jean (1)	2,230	16–5	2–2
March 22	Houston	John Euliano Park	**W** 7–1	**W. Hartley** (4–0)	R. Roman (0–3)	None	2,285	17–5	3–2
March 23	Houston	John Euliano Park	**L** 4–7	C. Scinta (2–0)	**I. Williams** (0–1)	None	2,208	17–6	3–3
March 25	at Jacksonville	John Sessions Stadium; Jacksonville, FL	**L** 2–3	A. Zenus (1–2)	**G. Siegel** (2–2)	N. Anello (7)	517	17–7	–
March 28	at Cincinnati	UC Baseball Stadium; Cincinnati, OH	**L** 4–6	N. Taylor (4–0)	**R. Sandefer** (1–2)	B. Scheurer (2)	1,324	17–8	3–4
March 29	at Cincinnati	UC Baseball Stadium	**L** 6–7^{10}	C. Horst (1–0)	**S. Bauer** (0–1)	None	1,177	17–9	3–5
March 30	at Cincinnati	UC Baseball Stadium	**L** 7–10	H. Johnson (4–0)	**K. Schoneboom** (1–1)	B. Scheurer (3)	811	17–10	3–6

April (7–10)
Date	Opponent	Stadium Site	Score	Win	Loss	Save	Attendance	Overall Record	Big 12 Record
April 1	Stetson	John Euliano Park	**W** 2–0^{5}	**M. Sauser** (2–0)	E. Phillips (0–2)	None	1,975	18–10	–
April 4	No. 23 Kansas	John Euliano Park	**L** 2–9	D. Voegele (5–2)	**A. Smith** (0–1)	None	2,327	18–11	3–7
April 5	No. 23 Kansas	John Euliano Park	**L** 9–10	E. Lin (2–2)	**A. Galvan** (0–1)	A. Breckheimer (2)	2,513	18–12	3–8
April 6	No. 23 Kansas	John Euliano Park	**L** 4–13	C. Moore (3–0)	**D. Stagliano** (1–2)	None	2,407	18–13	3–9
April 8	at North Florida	Harmon Stadium; Jacksonville, FL	**L** 5–6	K. Humphrey (1–1)	**K. Sosnowski** (2–1)	None	502	18–14	–
April 11	at Kansas State	Tointon Family Stadium; Manhattan, KS	**W** 15–3	**A. Smith** (1–1)	J. Frost (0–2)	None	2,344	19–14	4–9
April 12	at Kansas State	Tointon Family Stadium	**L** 1–3	J. Guyette (4–1)	**K. Sosnowski** (2–2)	None	2,344	19–15	4–10
April 13	at Kansas State	Tointon Family Stadium	**L** 6–8	L. Sheffield (5–3)	**W. Hartley** (4–1)	J. Guyette (2)	2,344	19–16	4–11
April 15	Florida A&M	John Euliano Park	**W** 5–1	**G. Siegel** (3–2)	T. Hanselman (0–5)	**D. Stagliano** (1)	1,682	20–16	–
April 17	No. 25 TCU	John Euliano Park	**L** 1–6	T. LaPour (6–2)	**C. Walker** (0–1)	None	2,115	20–17	4–12
April 18	No. 25 TCU	John Euliano Park	**W** 5–1	**R. Sandefer** (2–2)	B. Sloan (3–2)	**D. Castellano** (1)	2,202	21–17	5–12
April 19	No. 25 TCU	John Euliano Park	**W** 4–2	**M. Sauser** (3–0)	C. Parker (2–1)	**A. Galvan** (2)	1,981	22–17	6–12
April 22	at Florida Atlantic	FAU Baseball Stadium; Boca Raton, FL	**W** 17–2^{7}	**G. Siegel** (4–2)	D. Oborne (0–1)	None	1,519	23–17	–
April 25	No. 17 West Virginia	John Euliano Park	**L** 1–4	R. Bassinger (5–0)	**D. Stagliano** (1–3)	C. Estridge (4)	1,965	23–18	6–13
April 26	No. 17 West Virginia	John Euliano Park	**L** 10–15	C. Meyer (8–1)	**K. Sosnowski** (2–3)	C. Estridge (5)	2,245	23–19	6–14
April 27	No. 17 West Virginia	John Euliano Park	**L** 3–4	J. Kartsonas (5–1)	**M. Sauser** (3–1)	B. McDougal (1)	1,853	23–20	6–15
April 29	North Florida	John Euliano Park	**W** 9–3	**W. Hartley** (5–1)	T. Nikolis (0–1)	**D. Stagliano** (2)	1,701	24–20	–

May (5–6)
Date	Opponent	Stadium Site	Score	Win	Loss	Save	Attendance	Overall Record	Big 12 Record
May 2	at Oklahoma State	O'Brate Stadium; Stillwater, OK	**L** 0–12	H. Bodendorf (8–1)	**C. Walker** (0–2)	None	4,323	24–21	6–16
May 3	at Oklahoma State	O'Brate Stadium	**L** 1–3	M. Pesca (4–2)	**R. Sandefer** (2–3)	G. Davis (1)	4,633	24–22	6–17
May 4	at Oklahoma State	O'Brate Stadium	**L** 6–10	S. Youngerman (3–1)	**M. Sauser** (3–2)	M. Brown (1)	4,312	24–23	6–18
May 6	at Missouri State	Hammons Field; Springfield, MO	**W** 13–2	**K. Sosnowski** (3–3)	K. Thomas (1–2)	None	1,077	25–23	–
May 9	at Texas Tech	Dan Law Field at Rip Griffin Park; Lubbock, TX	**W** 7–3	**D. Castellano** (6–1)	L. Pirko (0–4)	None	3,453	26–23	7–18
May 10	at Texas Tech	Dan Law Field at Rip Griffin Park	**L** 2–3^{11}	J. Cebert (7–2)	**A. Galvan** (0–2)	None	3,726	26–24	7–19
May 11	at Texas Tech	Dan Law Field at Rip Griffin Park	**W** 15–6	**D. Stagliano** (2–3)	Z. Petty (1–4)	None	3,427	27–24	8–19
May 13	Presbyterian	John Euliano Park	**W** 22–5	**G. Siegel** (5–2)	M. McDaniel (1–2)	None	1,572	28–24	–
May 15	Baylor	John Euliano Park	**L** 4–5	L. Davenport (4–1)	**K. Sosnowski** (3–4)	G. Craig (10)	1,802	28–25	8–20
May 16	Baylor	John Euliano Park	**L** 4–5	C. Bunch (2–0)	**K. Schoneboom** (1–2)	G. Murry (10)	2,111	28–26	8–21
May 17	Baylor	John Euliano Park	**W** 11–7	**W. Hartley** (6–1)	C. Jameson (2–1)	**D. Castellano** (2)	1,811	29–26	9–21

Schedule source:

*Rankings are based on the team's current ranking in the D1Baseball poll.
