= Gavin Kelly (baseball) =

American baseball player (born 2005)

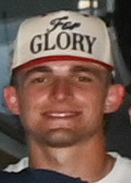
- Kelly in 2026

West Virginia Mountaineers – No. 2
- Catcher / Second baseman
- Born: December 13, 2005 (age 20); Pittsburgh, Pennsylvania, U.S.
- Bats: Right Throws: Right

Gavin William Kelly (born December 13, 2005) is an American college baseball catcher and second baseman for the West Virginia Mountaineers.

== Career ==
Kelly attended Central Catholic High School in Pittsburgh, Pennsylvania. He committed to West Virginia University to play college baseball.

Kelly is a catcher and plays second base at West Virginia. As a freshman in 2025, he played in 51 games with 45 starts and hit .299/.402/.395 with two home runs and 37 RBI. He was named to the All-Big 12 Freshman Team. After the season he played in the Cape Cod Baseball League for the Bourne Braves. Kelly returned to West Virginia for his sophomore year in 2026.
