= Brendan Summerhill =

American baseball player (born 2003)

Tampa Bay Rays
- Outfielder
- Born: November 13, 2003 (age 22); Chicago, Illinois, U.S.
- Bats: Left Throws: Right

Brendan Michael Summerhill (born November 13, 2003) is an American professional baseball outfielder in the Tampa Bay Rays organization.

== Amateur career ==
Summerhill attended Whitney M. Young Magnet High School in Chicago, Illinois. During his high school career he hit .441. He committed to the University of Arizona to play college baseball. During the summer prior to his freshman year at Arizona he played summer collegiate ball for the Traverse City Pit Spitters of the Northwoods League, sharing a roster with his older brother Colin.

Summerhill played in 22 games with 18 starts his freshman year in 2023, hitting .259/.419/.414 with two home runs and six runs batted in (RBI) over 58 at bats. After his freshman year, he returned to the Northwoods League, splitting his time between the Pit Spitters and the Rockford Rivets.

As a sophomore in 2024, he started 58 of 59 games and hit .324/.399/.550 with eight home runs and 59 RBI. After the season he played for the Wareham Gatemen of the Cape Cod League.

Summerhill entered his junior year in 2025 as a top prospect for the upcoming MLB draft. Over 44 games played, he batted .343 with four home runs and 34 RBI, missing time due to injury.

== Professional career ==
Summerhill was drafted by the Tampa Bay Rays in the first round with the 42nd overall selection of the 2025 Major League Baseball draft. He signed with Tampa Bay on July 19, 2025, for a $1.99 million signing bonus.
