= Bischel =

Bischel is a surname. Notable people with the surname include:

- Jordan Bischel (born 1981), American baseball player and coach
- Ryan Bischel (born 1999), American ice hockey player
