= Cincinnati Bearcats baseball =

Baseball team of the University of Cincinnati

- 2026 Cincinnati Bearcats baseball team
- Founded: 1886; 140 years ago
- Overall record: 1854–1979–21 (.484)
- University: University of Cincinnati
- Head coach: Jordan Bischel (3rd season)
- Conference: Big 12 Conference
- Location: Cincinnati, Ohio
- Home stadium: UC Baseball Stadium (capacity: 3,085)
- Nickname: Bearcats
- Colors: Red and black

NCAA tournament appearances
- 1956, 1958, 1961, 1967, 1971, 1974, 2019, 2025, 2026

Conference tournament champions
- AAC: 2019

Conference regular season champions
- OAC: 1918, 1920, 1921, 1923 Buckeye: 1928, 1930 MVC: 1958, 1961, 1965, 1967, 1969, 1970 Great Midwest: 1995

The Cincinnati Bearcats baseball team represents The University of Cincinnati in NCAA Division I intercollegiate men's baseball competition. The Bearcats currently compete in the Big 12 Conference.

The University of Cincinnati began varsity intercollegiate competition in baseball in 1886. Former Bearcats who have gone on to success in Major League Baseball include hall of fame members Sandy Koufax and Miller Huggins, 3-time MLB All-Star and 2-time World Series Champion Kevin Youkilis, and 2-time MLB All-Star Josh Harrison.

The Bearcats are currently coached by Jordan Bischel. Cincinnati plays home games on-campus at UC Baseball Stadium.

The 2023 baseball season marked the program's last season as a member of the AAC. In September 2021, Cincinnati, Houston, and UCF accepted bids to join the Big 12. On June 10, 2022 the American Athletic Conference and the three schools set to depart from the league (Cincinnati, Houston, UCF) announced that they had reached a buyout agreement that will allow those schools to join the Big 12 Conference in 2023.

== Head coaches ==
Tenure	Coach	Seasons	Record	Pct.
1893–1894	Frank Sanford Brown	2	6–5–1	.542
1895	John M. Thomas Jr.	1	4–2	.667
1896	Ralph Holterhoff	1	3–6	.333
1903–1904	Anthony Chez	2	9–7	.563
1905–1906	Amos Foster	2	6–8	.429
1907–1909	Ralph Inott	3	7–11	.389
1910	Ernie Diehl	1	6–2–1	.722
1911	Joe Monfort	1	4–5	.444
1912	John Binder	1	1–6	.143
1913	Raymond Church	1	4–2	.667
1918	Dr. Jesse F. Williams	1	4–1	.800
1919–1928	Boyd Chambers	10	80–51–1	.610
1929–1932	Frank "Doc" Rice	4	31–22–1	.583
1933–1937	Dana M. King	5	28–33	.459
1938–1939	Rip Van Winkle	2	5–17	.227
1940, 1949	Bud Bonar	2	8–17–1	.327
1941–1943	Joseph A. Meyer	3	18–17	.514
1945	Vern Ullom	1	0–3	.000
1946	Ray Nolting	1	6–2	.750
1947–1948	Bill Schwarberg	2	19–16	.543
1950–1951	Hank Zureick	2	17–17	.500
1952–1953	John Beckel	2	13–21	.382
1954–1960	Ed Jucker	7	84–38	.689
1961–1981	Glenn Sample	21	391–349–10	.528
1982	Pat Quinn	1	14–32	.304
1983–1986	Tom Higgins	4	85–113–1	.430
1987–1990	Jim Schmitz	4	104–101	.507
1991–1992	Richard Skeel	2	50–56	.472
1993–1996	Bruce Gordon	4	69–125	.356
1997–2013	Brian Cleary	17	436–528–1	.452
2014–2017	Ty Neal	4	91–132–1	.408
2018–2023	Scott Googins	6	143–157	.477
2024–present	Jordan Bischel	3	103–73	.585
Total	33 coaches	126 seasons	1854–1979–21	(.484)

Longest Tenure
Rank	Name	Seasons
1	Glen Sample	21
2	Brian Cleary	17
3	Boyd Chambers	10

Most Wins
Rank	Name	Wins
1	Brian Cleary	436
2	Glenn Sample	391
3	Scott Googins	143

Best Winning Pct.
Rank	Name	Pct.
1	Jesse Williams	.800
2	Ray Nolting	.750
3	Ed Jucker	.689

== Year-by-year results ==
Record table
Season	Coach	Overall	Conference	Standing	Postseason
Independent (1886–1910)
1886	Unknown	2–0			
No Records Found (1887–1892)
1893	Frank Sanford Brown	0–2–1			
1894	Frank Sanford Brown	6–3			
1895	John M. Thomas Jr.	4–2			
1896	Ralph Holterhoff	3–6			
No Records Found (1897–1899)
1900	Unknown	2–2			
No Records Found (1901–1902)
1903	Anthony Chez	3–4			
1904	Anthony Chez	6–3			
1905	Amos Foster	2–3			
1906	Amos Foster	4–5			
1907	Ralph Inott	1–4			
1908	Ralph Inott	2–4			
1909	Ralph Inott	4–3			
1910	Ernie Diehl	6–2–1			
Ohio Athletic Conference (1911–1925)
1911	Joe Monfort	4–5	1–0		
1912	John Binder	1–6	0–1		
1913	Raymond Church	4–2	1–1		
1914	Unknown	1–2–2	1–1–1		
No Team Fielded (WWI) (1915–1917)
1918	Jesse Williams	4–1	3–1		
1919	Boyd Chambers	1–5	1–2		
1920	Boyd Chambers	8–2	4–0	1st	
1921	Boyd Chambers	8–9	5–1		
1922	Boyd Chambers	9–6	5–3		
1923	Boyd Chambers	8–2	5–0		
1924	Boyd Chambers	6–7	4–1	2nd	
1925	Boyd Chambers	7–6	6–3		
Buckeye Athletic Association (1926–1938)
1926	Boyd Chambers	7–7–1	6–6	3rd	
1927	Boyd Chambers	9–4	7–2	2nd	
1928	Boyd Chambers	9–3	8–1	1st	
1929	Frank E. Rice	12–6	8–2		
1930	Frank E. Rice	11–9–1	6–2	T–1st	
1931	Frank E. Rice	3–4	3–4		
1932	Frank E. Rice	5–3	5–3		
1933	Dana M. King	3–6	3–6		
1934	Dana M. King	9–5	6–4		
1935	Dana M. King	6–7	6–4		
1936	Dana M. King	6–8	5–4		
1937	Dana M. King	4–7	2–6		
1938	Walter Van Winkle	2–8	2–5		
Independent (1939–1946)
1939	Walter Van Winkle	3–9			
1940	Reyman "Bud" Bonar	3–7			
1941	Joseph A. Meyer	5–7			
1942	Joseph A. Meyer	4–7			
1943	Joseph A. Meyer	9–3			
No Team Fielded (WWII) (1944–1944)
1945	Vern Ullom	0–3			
1946	Ray Nolting	6–2			
Mid-American Conference (1947–1953)
1947	Bill Schwarberg	8–8	1–5	5th	
1948	Bill Schwarberg	11–8	3–5	5th	
1949	Reyman "Bud" Bonar	5–10–1	3–5–1	5th	
1950	Hank Zureick	8–10	4–6	5th	
1951	Hank Zureick	9–7	1–4	4th	
1952	John Beckel	5–11	3–5	5th	
1953	John Beckel	8–10	3–5	5th	
Independent (1954–1957)
1954	Ed Jucker	8–6			
1955	Ed Jucker	12–4			
1956	Ed Jucker	13–4			District 4 playoffs, 0–1
1957	Ed Jucker	9–3			
Missouri Valley Conference (1958–1970)
1958	Ed Jucker	17–6	8–3	1st	MVC Championship Series 1–0
1959	Ed Jucker	13–7	6–2	2nd	
1960	Ed Jucker	12–8	6–1	2nd	MVC Championship Series 0–1
1961	Glenn Sample	18–5–2	8–0	1st	MVC Championship Series 2–0; District 4 playoffs, 1–2
1962	Glenn Sample	17–11	2–1	1st	MVC Tournament 0–1
1963	Glenn Sample	12–18	1–2	5th	MVC Tournament 2–2
1964	Glenn Sample	10–14	3–2	7th	MVC Tournament 0–1
1965	Glenn Sample	21–15	5–1	2nd	MVC Championship Series 0–2
1966	Glenn Sample	12–14–1	2–4	5th	
1967	Glenn Sample	19–11–1	6–1	1st	MVC Championship Series 2–1; District 5 playoffs, 1–2
1968	Glenn Sample	14–13–1	3–5	5th	
1969	Glenn Sample	18–14	5–1	2nd	MVC Championship Series 1–2
1970	Glenn Sample	15–13–1	7–1	T–1st	MVC Championship Series 0–2
Independent (1971–1975)
1971	Glenn Sample	26–18			District 4 playoffs, 2–2
1972	Glenn Sample	24–16–1			
1973	Glenn Sample	22–18			
1974	Glenn Sample	27–16–2			District 4 playoffs, 0–2
1975	Glenn Sample	21–14			
Metro Conference (1976–1991)
1976	Glenn Sample	19–31–1	0–2	5th	Metro Tournament 0–1
1977	Glenn Sample	16–23	3–0	7th	Metro Tournament 0–2
1978	Glenn Sample	21–24	0–8	5th	Metro Tournament 1–2
1979	Glenn Sample	29–13	6–3	5th	Metro Tournament 2–2
1980	Glenn Sample	18–19	2–4	5th	Metro Tournament 0–2
1981	Glenn Sample	12–29	1–9	7th	Metro Tournament 1–2
1982	Tom Higgins	14–32	3–5	6th	Metro Tournament 1–2
1983	Tom Higgins	17–31	1–3	6th	Metro Tournament 1–2
1984	Tom Higgins	13–29–1	0–10	7th	Metro Tournament 2–2
1985	Tom Higgins	29–25	7–10	5th	Metro Tournament 1–2
1986	Tom Higgins	26–28	9–9	5th	Metro Tournament 1–2
1987	Jim Schmitz	31–21	5–8	6th	Metro Tournament 3–2
1988	Jim Schmitz	28–21	7–10	6th	Metro Tournament 1–2
1989	Jim Schmitz	21–30	3–14	7th	Metro Tournament 2–2
1990	Lance Brown	23–29	5–10	6th	Metro Tournament 3–2
1991	Richard Skeel	28–30	2–19	8th	Metro Tournament 2–2
Great Midwest Conference (1992–1995)
1992	Richard Skeel	22–26	5–11	4th	Great Midwest Tournament 2–2
1993	Bruce Gordon	16–29	3–15	4th	Great Midwest Tournament 0–2
1994	Bruce Gordon	14–41	3–19	5th	Great Midwest Tournament 2–2
1995	Bruce Gordon	34–21	17–6	1st	Great Midwest Tournament 2–2
Conference USA (1996–2005)
1996	Bruce Gordon	5–34	1–19	9th	C-USA tournament 0–1
1997	Brian Cleary	12–46	4–23	10th	C-USA tournament 1–2
1998	Brian Cleary	15–38	4–20	10th	C-USA tournament 0–1
1999	Brian Cleary	30–29	9–18	8th	C-USA tournament 1–2
2000	Brian Cleary	35–25	11–16	6th	C-USA tournament 3–1
2001	Brian Cleary	34–24	16–11	4th	C-USA tournament 0–2
2002	Brian Cleary	26–29–1	11–18–1	9th	
2003	Brian Cleary	15–39	7–22	11th	
2004	Brian Cleary	15–40	6–24	11th	
2005	Brian Cleary	25-30	10–19	10th	
Big East Conference (2006–2013)
2006	Brian Cleary	32–26	13–14	7th	Big East tournament, 0–2
2007	Brian Cleary	28–28	10–16	10th	
2008	Brian Cleary	39–20	19–8	2nd	Big East tournament, 3–1
2009	Brian Cleary	29–29	13–14	9th	Big East tournament, 0–2
2010	Brian Cleary	29–29	13–14	7th	Big East tournament, 0–2
2011	Brian Cleary	30–27	14–13	6th	Big East tournament, 0–2
2012	Brian Cleary	18–38	7–20	12th	
2013	Brian Cleary	24–32	6–18	9th	
American Athletic Conference (2014–2023)
2014	Ty Neal	22–31	6–18	9th	
2015	Ty Neal	15–41	6–18	8th	AAC tournament, 0–2
2016	Ty Neal	26–30–1	13–10–1	4th	AAC tournament, 0–2
2017	Ty Neal	28–30	10–14	6th	AAC tournament, 0–2
2018	Scott Googins	28–28	12–12	6th	AAC tournament, 0–2
2019	Scott Googins	31–31	13–11	2nd	AAC tournament, 4–0; NCAA Regional, 1–2
2020	Scott Googins	7–8	0–0		Cancelled
2021	Scott Googins	29–26	18–14	4th	AAC tournament, 0–2
2022	Scott Googins	24–31	12–12	4th	AAC tournament, 1–2
2023	Scott Googins	24–33	10–14	5th	AAC tournament, 0–2
Big 12 Conference (2024–present)
2024	Jordan Bischel	32–25	17–13	5th	Big 12 tournament, 1–2
2025	Jordan Bischel	33–26	16–14	8th	Big 12 tournament, 1–1; NCAA Regional, 1–2
2026	Jordan Bischel	38–22	17–13	T–6th	Big 12 tournament, 0–1; NCAA Regional, 1–2
Total:		1854–1979–21			
National champion Postseason invitational champion Conference regular season champion Conference regular season and conference tournament champion Division regular season champion Division regular season and conference tournament champion Conference tournament champion

As of end through 2026 season

== Cincinnati in the NCAA tournament ==
- The NCAA Division I baseball tournament started in 1947.
- The format of the tournament has changed through the years.

Year	Record	Pct	Notes
1956	0–1	.000	Lost in District 4 playoff game to Ohio
1961	1–2	.333	Lost in District 4 series to Michigan (double elimination series)
1967	1–2	.333	Lost in District 5 series to Oklahoma State
1971	2–2	.500	Lost in District 4 series to Southern Illinois
1974	0–2	.000	Lost in District 4 playoff series to Miami (Ohio) and Southern Illinois
2019	1–2	.333	Eliminated by Creighton in the Corvallis Regional
2025	1–2	.333	Eliminated by Wake Forest in the Knoxville Regional
2026	1–2	.333	Eliminated by Louisiana in the Starkville Regional

== Team records ==
=== Single Game ===
Year	Record	Opponent
1930	At Bats in a game (72)	vs Miami (OH)
1993	Runs (26)	vs UAB
1997	Runs Allowed (36)	vs Rice
1993	Hits (29)	vs UAB
2002	Doubles (9)	at Xavier
1956	Triples (5)	vs Wittenburg
2002	Home runs (8)	vs USF
1993	Total bases (54)	vs UAB
1993	Runs Batted In (24)	vs UAB
1960	Stolen bases (10)	vs Drake
1963	Errors (11)	vs Southern Illinois
1930	Longest game (21 Innings)	vs Miami (OH)
1958	Largest margin of victory (21)	vs Kenyon
1952	Most runs scored in an Inning (16)	vs Morehead State

== No Hitters ==
There have been 6 No-Hitters in Cincinnati baseball history, the last one occurred in 1995.

Date	Pitcher(s)	Opponent	Notes
May 6, 1910	John Binder	vs. Denison	
May 4, 1965	Neil Rubinstein	vs. Hanover	7 Innings
1967	Jose Worrall	vs. Ohio State	7 Innings
1973	T. Burman & C. Poston	vs. Quinnipiac	7 Innings
1982	Mark Thompson	vs. Wright State	7 Innings
1995	Chris Murphy	vs. IUPUI	5 Innings

== Retired numbers ==
No.	Member	Position	Career	Year No. Retired
1	Glen Sample	Head coach	1961–1981	2010
12	Ed Jucker	Head coach	1954–1960	2010
36	Kevin Youkilis	3B	1998–2001	2016

== All-Americans ==
- First Team All-Americans

1961 Bill Faul
1965 Billy Wolf
2015 Ian Happ

- Second Team All-Americans

1967 Pat Maginn
2000 Kevin Youkilis
2008 Josh Harrison
2009 Lance Durham

- Third Team All-Americans

1962 Bill Faul
2001 Kevin Youkilis

- Honorable Mentions

1974 Tim Burman
1996 Steve Barhorst

- Freshman All-Americans

1999 Chris Hamblen
2001 Tony Maynard
2002 Kyle Markle
2006 Steve Blevins
2006 Josh Harrison
2010 Andrew Strenge
2011 Justin Glass
2013 Ian Happ

== Cincinnati and MLB ==
Cincinnati has had 22 players reach Major League Baseball (MLB). Some notable alumni to reach the majors include Tony Campana and Josh Harrison who made their MLB debuts during the 2011 season. Two former Bearcats Miller Huggins and Sandy Koufax are members of the Baseball Hall of Fame. This list of Cincinnati Bearcats baseball players includes former members of the Cincinnati Bearcats baseball team that represents the University of Cincinnati, who have played in one or more regular season Major League Baseball (MLB) games.

Hall of Famer Sandy Koufax

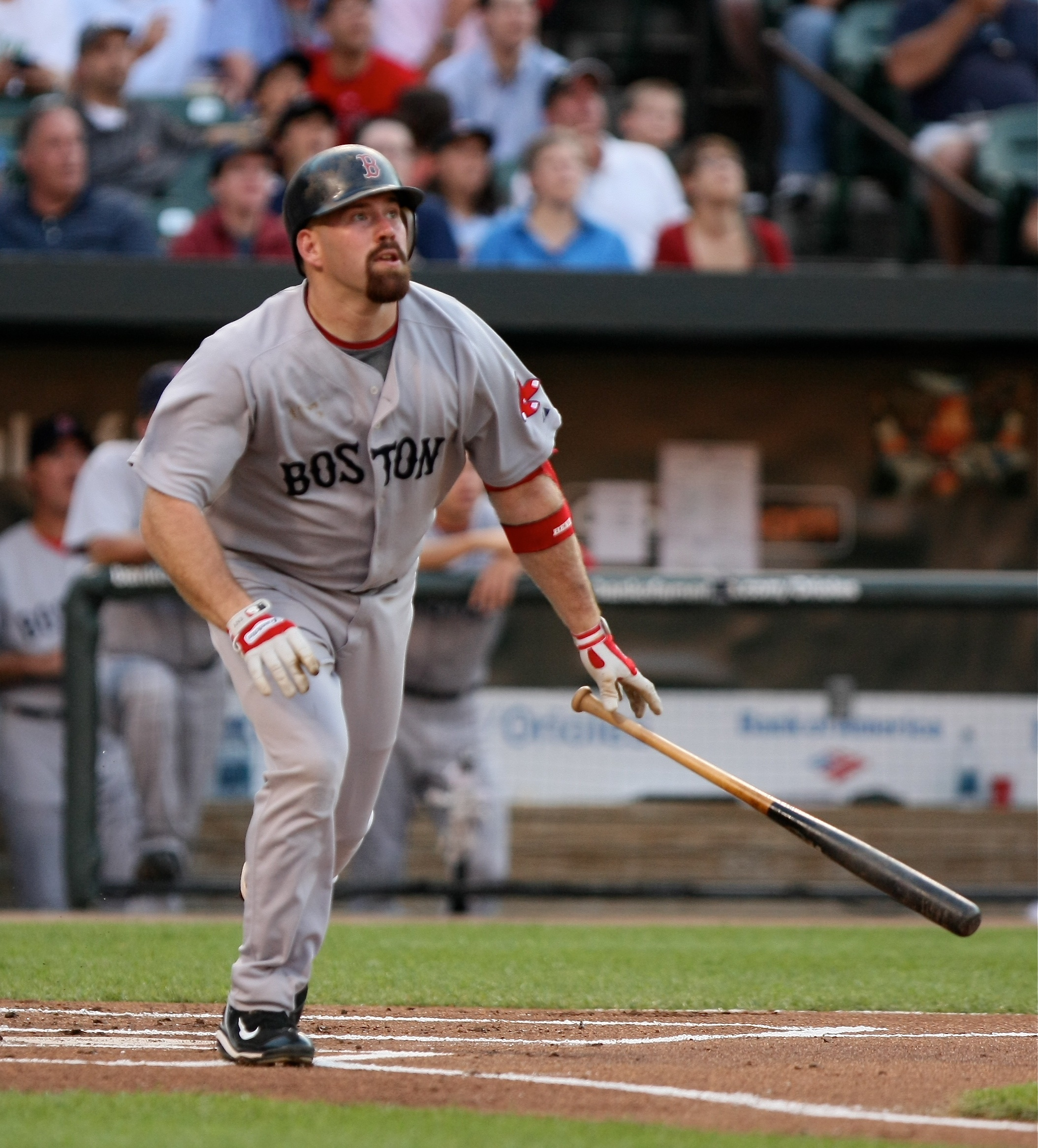
3x All Star Kevin Youkilis

- Butch Alberts
- Ethan Allen
- Skeeter Barnes
- Carl Bouldin
- Ed Brinkman
  All Star, Gold Glove
- Jack Bushelman
- Tony Campana
- Bill Faul
- George Glinatsis
- Josh Harrison
  2× MLB All-Star
- Mike Hershberger
- Ian Happ
- Miller Huggins
  Baseball Hall of Fame manager
- Sandy Koufax
  Baseball Hall of Famer, 7× MLB All-Star, NL MVP, 3× Cy Young Award
- Ryan Noda
- Art Warren
- Joey Wiemer
- Kevin Youkilis
  3x MLB All Star, Gold Glove, Hank Aaron Award

=== All Time MLB Draft Picks ===
Note: the first Major League Baseball draft was held in 1965.

Cincinnati MLB Drafted Players
Year	Round	Overall pick	Player	Team
1965	3	60	Billy Wolff	STL
1966	36	675	John Meyer	NYM
1967^{1rg}	7	125	John Meyer	CLE
1967^{6sc}	8	150	John Meyer	CLE
1969^{1rg}	7	125	David Jakubs	STL
1970	23	550	Rick DeFelice	CIN
1972	23	533	Denny Nagel	HOU
1972	28	642	Butch Alberts	PIT
1974	33	641	Timothy Burman	PIT
1975^{1sc}	4	79	Timothy Burman	PIT
1977^{1rg}	2	27	Bobby Sagers	MON
1977	23	556	Brady Baldwin	ATL
1977	28	669	Jeffrey Wilson	MON
1978	16	407	Skeeter Barnes	CIN
1978	25	596	Mark Roush	ATL
1982^{1rg}	10	241	James Bettis	MON
1984	19	475	Lalo Berezo	CIN
1985	19	474	Tom Summers	CIN
1986	3	78	Dave Sala	STL
1988	14	353	John Zaksek	CWS
1988	42	1079	Joe Tenhunfeld	PHI
1988	58	1352	Riley Stephens	CWS
1990	49	1241	George Glinatsis	CWS
1991	32	838	George Glinatsis	SEA
1992	43	1215	Bill Metzinger	COL
1995	40	1119	Chris Murphy	COL
1998	16	470	Casey McEvoy	CIN
2001	8	243	Kevin Youkilis	BOS
2001	25	756	Curtus Moak	SF
2001	35	1066	Chris Hamblen	SF
2002	13	382	Chris Hamblen	TEX
2005	23	690	Mark Haske	DET
2005	31	941	Josh Kay	OAK
2006	12	354	Logan Parker	CIN
2007	24	725	John Baird	TB
2008	6	191	Josh Harrison	CHC
2008	7	216	Dan Osterbrock	MIN
2008	13	401	Tony Campana	CHC
2009	11	333	Mike Spina	OAK
2009	14	430	Lance Durham	TOR
2009	38	1148	Kevin Johnson	FLA
2010	17	519	Brian Garman	MIL
2010	42	1276	Kevin Johnson	TEX
2011	20	625	Dan Jensen	CIN
2012	8	261	Zach Isler	CWS
2012	14	430	Jake Proctor	MIN
2012	32	982	Christian McElroy	CIN
2014	12	348	Connor Walsh	CWS
2015	1	9	Ian Happ	CHC
2017	15	459	Ryan Noda	TOR
2017	29	857	A.J. Bumpass	CIN
2018	10	290	Manny Rodriguez	NYM
2018	24	714	Cam Alldred	PIT
2018	29	874	J.T. Perez	MIN
2019	39	1164	A.J. Bumpass	CIN
2020	4	121	Joey Wiemer	MIL
2021	7	200	Evan Shawver	COL
2024	6	171	Josh Kross	STL

^{6sc} – June Secondary
^{1rg} – January Draft
^{1sc} – January Secondary Draft

== See also ==
- List of NCAA Division I baseball programs
- Cincinnati Bearcats
