= Ty Neal =

American baseball player and coach

Biographical details
- Born: West Elkton, Ohio, U.S.

Playing career
- 1996–1999: Miami (OH)
- Position: Pitcher

Coaching career (HC unless noted)
- 2000: Miami (OH) (asst.)
- 2001–2003: Southern Illinois (asst.)
- 2004: Cincinnati (asst.)
- 2005: Miami (OH) (asst.)
- 2006–2013: Indiana (Asst.)
- 2014–2017: Cincinnati
- 2018: Arizona State (QC)
- 2024-present: Michigan (asst.)

Head coaching record
- Overall: 91–132–1
- Tournaments: AAC: 0–6

Tyson B. Neal is an American college baseball coach and former player. He served as head coach of the Cincinnati Bearcats baseball team from 2014 to 2017.

Neal was a four-year letterman at Miami, earning 19 victories as a pitcher. He began his coaching career as an assistant with the RedHawks for one season before moving to Southern Illinois for three years. After a one-year return to Miami, he spent a year on staff at Cincinnati and an eight-year stint with Indiana, where he added pitching coach and recruiting coordinator duties. In 2013, he helped lead the Hoosiers to their first College World Series. On June 7, 2013, Neal was named head coach at Cincinnati, and took over the duties following Indiana's elimination from the 2013 College World Series. On May 23, 2017, two days before Cincinnati was scheduled to play its first game in the American Athletic Conference tournament, it was announced Neal would step down from his head coaching responsibilities. The announcement cited personal reasons as the only factor.

== Head coaching record ==
The following is a table of Neal's yearly records as an NCAA head baseball coach.

Record table
Season	Team	Overall	Conference	Standing	Postseason
Cincinnati Bearcats (American Athletic Conference) (2014–2017)
2014	Cincinnati	22–31	6–18	9th (9)	
2015	Cincinnati	15–41	6–18	8th (8)	AAC Tournament (Note: In 2015, all eight members of the American Athletic Conference qualified for its postseason tournament.)
2016	Cincinnati	26–30–1	13–10–1	4th (8)	AAC Tournament
2017	Cincinnati	28–30	10–14	6th (8)	AAC Tournament
Cincinnati:		91–132–1	35–60–1		
Total:		91–132–1			
National champion Postseason invitational champion Conference regular season champion Conference regular season and conference tournament champion Division regular season champion Division regular season and conference tournament champion Conference tournament champion
