= 2016 Cincinnati Bearcats baseball team =

American college baseball season

2016 Cincinnati Bearcats baseball
- Conference: American Athletic Conference
- Record: 26-29-1 (13-10-1 The American)
- Head coach: Ty Neal (3rd season)
- Assistant coaches: John Lackaff (2nd season); Ted Tom (1st season); Dustin Coffman (3rd season)
- Home stadium: Marge Schott Stadium

2016 American Athletic Conference baseball standings
	Conf.						Overall
Team	W		L		T	PCT	W		L		T	PCT
No. 25 Tulane ‍†‍‍^{y}	15	–	7	–	0	.682	39	–	19	–	0	.672
No. 15 East Carolina ‍‍‍^{y}	15	–	8	–	1	.646	34	–	21	–	1	.616
Connecticut ‍‍‡‍^{y}	14	–	9	–	0	.609	37	–	23	–	0	.617
Cincinnati ‍‍‍	13	–	10	–	1	.563	26	–	30	–	1	.465
Houston ‍‍‍	11	–	12	–	0	.478	36	–	23	–	0	.610
Memphis ‍‍‍	9	–	15	–	0	.375	22	–	39	–	0	.361
South Florida ‍‍‍	8	–	16	–	0	.333	24	–	33	–	0	.421
UCF ‍‍‍	8	–	16	–	0	.333	26	–	33	–	0	.441
† – Conference champion ‡ – Tournament champion y – Invited to the NCAA tournament As of June 2, 2016; Rankings from Collegiate Baseball

The 2016 Cincinnati Bearcats baseball team represented the University of Cincinnati during the 2016 NCAA Division I baseball season. The Bearcats played their home games at Marge Schott Stadium as a member of the American Athletic Conference. They were led by head coach Ty Neal, in his third season at Cincinnati. The UC Baseball team was the youngest team in the nation in 2015. The 2016 team featured 29 underclassmen (14 freshmen, two redshirt freshmen, 12 sophomores and one redshirt sophomore) to just six upperclassmen (two juniors, one redshirt junior and three seniors).

On March 21, 2016 Cincinnati defeated Northwestern 10–3 for the 8th straight win, also the 200th win at Marge Schott Stadium. The 8–0 record at home was the best start for any UC team at home since going a perfect 10–0 at home in 1961. Cincinnati finished the home schedule with an 18–7 record, the best winning percentage in the history of Marge Schott Stadium

== Previous season ==
In 2015, the Bearcats finished 8th in the American with a record of 15-41, 6–18 in conference play. They failed to qualify for the 2015 NCAA Division I baseball tournament. Ian Happ was drafted ninth overall by the Chicago Cubs. Happ was named first team American Baseball Coaches Association (ABCA), he was previously named First Team All-America by D1Baseball.com and was added to the second team by Baseball America, the NCBWA, Louisville Slugger Collegiate Baseball and College Sports Madness. He also was named a First Team Capital One Academic All-American by CoSIDA, along with AAC Player of the year

== Roster ==
2016 Cincinnati Bearcats baseball team
Players
Coaches

#	Pos.	Name	B/T	Height	Weight	Year	Home town
2	INF	Manny Rodriguez	L/L	5 ft 10 in (1.78 m)	161 lb (73 kg)	So	Brooklyn, N.Y
4	INF	Kyle Mottice	L/R	6 ft 0 in (1.83 m)	176 lb (80 kg)	So	Canal Fulton, OH
5	OF	Vince Augustine	R/R	6 ft 1 in (1.85 m)	190 lb (86 kg)	Fr	Cranberry Township, PA
6	OF	Jordan Ramey	R/R	5 ft 6 in (1.68 m)	150 lb (68 kg)	Fr	Cincinnati, OH
7	C	Joey Thomas	R/R	6 ft 1 in (1.85 m)	194 lb (88 kg)	So	Mason, OH
8	INF	Devin Wenzel	R/R	6 ft 1 in (1.85 m)	196 lb (89 kg)	Sr	Blandon, PA
10	C	Woody Wallace	R/R	5 ft 9 in (1.75 m)	185 lb (84 kg)	Sr	Lewis Center, OH
11	RHP	Andrew Zellner	R/R	6 ft 3 in (1.91 m)	190 lb (86 kg)	Jr	Farmersville, OH
13	LHP	Cam Alldred	S/L	6 ft 3 in (1.91 m)	200 lb (91 kg)	Jr	Batavia, OH
14	INF	Ryan Noda	L/L	6 ft 3 in (1.91 m)	216 lb (98 kg)	So	Volo, IL
16	RHP	Cameron Ross	R/R	6 ft 1 in (1.85 m)	170 lb (77 kg)	RS Fr	Hebron, KY
17	OF	Treg Haberkorn	L/L	6 ft 3 in (1.91 m)	198 lb (90 kg)	So	Leo, IN
18	INF	Connor McVey	R/R	6 ft 0 in (1.83 m)	190 lb (86 kg)	RS So	Mason, OH
19	LHP	Ryan Bettcher	L/L	5 ft 11 in (1.8 m)	172 lb (78 kg)	Fr	Lakeville, IN
20	OF	A.J. Bumpass	L/R	6 ft 2 in (1.88 m)	195 lb (88 kg)	Fr	Rougemont, NC
21	RHP	Jarod Yoakam	R/R	6 ft 2 in (1.88 m)	173 lb (78 kg)	Fr	Marysville, OH
22	LHP	A.J. Olasz	L/L	6 ft 1 in (1.85 m)	194 lb (88 kg)	So	West Mifflin, PA
23	RHP	Doug Lowe III	L/L	6 ft 2 in (1.88 m)	203 lb (92 kg)	RS Fr	Marysville, OH
24	LHP	Mitch Patishall	R/R	5 ft 11 in (1.8 m)	195 lb (88 kg)	Sr	Pendleton, IN
25	LHP	Chris Gang	L/L	6 ft 6 in (1.98 m)	190 lb (86 kg)	Fr	Lancaster, OH
28	LHP	J.T. Perez	L/L	6 ft 4 in (1.93 m)	201 lb (91 kg)	So	Orrville, OH
29	OF	R.J. Thompson	R/R	5 ft 10 in (1.78 m)	190 lb (86 kg)	Jr	Mason, OH
30	RHP	Cal Jarrett	R/R	6 ft 2 in (1.88 m)	200 lb (91 kg)	Fr	Dixon, IL
32	LHP	Colton Cleary	L/L	5 ft 10 in (1.78 m)	185 lb (84 kg)	RS Jr	Nicholasville, KY
33	LHP	Dalton Lehnen	L/L	6 ft 2 in (1.88 m)	208 lb (94 kg)	So	Lakeville, MN
34	RHP	A.J. Kullman	L/R	6 ft 8 in (2.03 m)	200 lb (91 kg)	Fr	Powell, OH
35	C	Mason DeAnna	R/R	5 ft 9 in (1.75 m)	165 lb (75 kg)	Fr	Olmsted Falls, OH
38	INF	Cole Murphy	L/R	6 ft 6 in (1.98 m)	217 lb (98 kg)	Fr	Cincinnati, OH
40	RHP	Nick Voss	R/R	6 ft 6 in (1.98 m)	199 lb (90 kg)	Fr	Loveland, OH
41	RHP	Clayton Colvin	R/R	6 ft 4 in (1.93 m)	205 lb (93 kg)	Fr	Dublin, OH
42	INF	Garrett Zoukis	R/R	6 ft 0 in (1.83 m)	175 lb (79 kg)	Fr	Reston, VA
43	LHP	Jack Bergren	L/L	6 ft 4 in (1.93 m)	178 lb (81 kg)	Fr	Chicago, IL
45	RHP	Tristan Hammans	L/L	6 ft 8 in (2.03 m)	236 lb (107 kg)	So	Bakersfield, CA
46	RHP	David Orndorff	R/R	6 ft 5 in (1.96 m)	189 lb (86 kg)	So	Pasadena, CA
48	INF	Christian Steele	L/R	6 ft 6 in (1.98 m)	230 lb (104 kg)	Fr	Mason, OH

Head coach

Ty Neal

Assistant coach(es)

John Lackaff
Ted Tom
Dustin Coffman

Legend

- (C) Team captain
- (S) Suspended
- (I) Ineligible
- Injured
- Current redshirt

Roster
Last update: February 17, 2016

== Schedule ==
2016 Cincinnati Bearcats baseball game log
Regular Season

February
Date	Opponent	Site/stadium	Score	Win	Loss	Save	TV	Attendance	Overall record	AAC record
February 19	at #7 LSU*	Alex Box Stadium/Skip Bertman Field • Baton Rouge, LA	**L** 5–6 (12)	Cartwright (1–0)	**Orndorff** (0–1)	None	SECN+	11,906	0–1	—
February 20	at #7 LSU*	Alex Box Stadium/Skip Bertman Field • Baton Rouge, LA	**L** 0–4	Lange (1–0)	**Patishall** (0–1)	None	SECN+	11,573	0–2	—
February 21	at #7 LSU*	Alex Box Stadium/Skip Bertman Field • Baton Rouge, LA	**L** 4–12	Valek III (1–0)	**Olasz** (0–1)	None	SECN+	10,334	0–3	—
February 26	vs WKU*	Foley Field • Athens, GA Georgia Foley Field Tournament	**L** 2–5	King (1–0)	**Zellner** (0–1)	Elder (2)			0–4	—
February 27	at Georgia*	Foley Field • Athens, GA Georgia Foley Field Tournament	**L** 6–7 (10)	Gist (1–0)	**Kullman** (0–1)	None	SECN+	2,522	0–5	—
February 28	vs South Alabama*	Foley Field • Athens, GA Georgia Foley Field Tournament	**L** 2–3	—	—	—			0–6	—

March
Date	Opponent	Site/stadium	Score	Win	Loss	Save	TV	Attendance	Overall record	AAC record
March 2	at Tennessee*	Lindsey Nelson Stadium • Knoxville, TN	**L** 1–7	Vasquez (1–0)	**Alldred** (0–1)	None		1,096	0–7	—
March 4	at Coastal Carolina*	Charles Watson Stadium • Conway, SC	**W** 10–7	**Zellner** (1–1)	Bilous (0–1)	None	Big South Network	1,417	1–7	—
March 5	vs. Ball State*	Charles Watson Stadium • Conway, SC Chanticleer Classic	**L** 3–4	Brockhouse (1–1)	**Perez** (0–1)	None		114	1–8	—
March 5	vs. Ball State*	Charles Watson Stadium • Conway, SC Chanticleer Classic	**L** 4–6	Burns (2–0)	**Olasz** (0–2)	Butler (2)		107	1–9	—
March 6	vs. #7 Ole Miss*	Charles Watson Stadium • Conway, SC Chanticleer Classic	**L** 1–7	Johnson (3–0)	**Lowe II** (0–1)	None		123	1–10	—
March 8	at Kentucky*	Cliff Hagan Stadium • Lexington, KY	**L** 4–8	Strecker (2–0)	**Yoakam** (0–1)	None	SECN+	2,062	1–11	—
March 11	Canisius*	Marge Schott Stadium • Cincinnati, OH	**W** 8–7 (10)	**Kullman** (1–1)	Remillard (0–1)	None			2–11	—
March 11	Canisius*	Marge Schott Stadium • Cincinnati, OH	**W** 6–1	**Perez** (1–1)	Shepley (1–2)	None		723	3–11	—
March 12	Canisius*	Marge Schott Stadium • Cincinnati, OH	**W** 7–6	**Clearly** (1–0)	Stevenson (0–4)	**Orndorff** (1)			4–11	—
March 12	Canisius*	Marge Schott Stadium • Cincinnati, OH	**W** 5–1	**Colvin** (1–0)	Smith (0–1)	None		742	5–11	—
March 15	Miami (OH)*	Marge Schott Stadium • Cincinnati, OH	**W** 7–2	**Orndorff** (1–1)	Graham (1–2)	**Yoakam** (1)		1,081	6–11	—
March 19	Northwestern*	Marge Schott Stadium • Cincinnati, OH	**W** 1–0	**Zellner** (2–1)	Reed (2–1)	None		431	7–11	—
March 20	Northwestern*	Marge Schott Stadium • Cincinnati, OH	**W** 6–5	**Kullman** (2–1)	Bordignon (1–2)	None		388	8–11	—
March 21	Northwestern*	Marge Schott Stadium • Cincinnati, OH	**W** 10–3	**Orndorff** (2–1)	Kubiuk (0–1)	None		292	9–11	—
March 25	Xavier*	Marge Schott Stadium • Cincinnati, OH	**W** 4–0	**Zellner** (3–1)	Lowther (2–3)	None		—	10–11	—
March 25	Xavier*	Marge Schott Stadium • Cincinnati, OH	**W** 9–2	**Perez** (2–1)	Jacknewitz (0–4)	None		607	11–11	—
March 26	at Xavier*	J. Page Hayden Field • Cincinnati, OH	**L** 3–6	Kirschner (2–1)	**Kullman** (2–2)	Schilling (4)		478	11–12	—
March 29	at Indiana*	Bart Kaufman Field • Bloomington, IN	**W** 5–0	**Olasz** (1–2)	Milto (1–1)	None		2,279	12–12	—

April
Date	Opponent	Site/stadium	Score	Win	Loss	Save	TV	Attendance	Overall record	AAC record
April 1	South Florida	Marge Schott Stadium • Cincinnati, OH	**L** 3–5	Sanders (3–1)	**Zellner** (3–2)	Evald (6)		503	12–13	0–1
April 2	South Florida	Marge Schott Stadium • Cincinnati, OH	**W** 3–2	**Perez** (3–1)	Lawson (3–2)	**Yoakam** (1)		492	13–13	1–1
April 3	South Florida	Marge Schott Stadium • Cincinnati, OH	**W** 4–3 (14)	**Yoakam** (1–1)	Perez (0–3)	None		471	14–13	2–1
April 5	Wright State*	Marge Schott Stadium • Cincinnati, OH	**L** 5–7	Milto (3–1)	**Lehnen** (0–1)			332	14–14	—
April 6	Indiana*	Marge Schott Stadium • Cincinnati, OH	**L** 3–7	Swaney (4–1)	**Hammans** (0–1)	None		366	14–15	—
April 8	Connecticut	Marge Schott Stadium • Cincinnati, OH	**W** 3–2 (13)	**Kullman** (3–2)	Nepiarsky (1–1)	None		241	15–15	3–1
April 9	Connecticut	Marge Schott Stadium • Cincinnati, OH	**W** 3–2	**Perez** (4–1)	Over (0–3)	**Orndorff** (2)		558	16–15	4–1
April 10	Connecticut	Marge Schott Stadium • Cincinnati, OH	**L** 2–4	Montgomerie (2–1)	**Orndorff** (2–2)	Polonia (4)		412	16–16	4–2
April 12	vs. Wright State*	Hayden Park • Oxford, OH Joe Nuxhall Classic	**L** 1–6	Sexton (3–2)	**Olasz** (1–3)	None		102	16–17	—
April 13	vs. Xavier*	Hayden Park • Oxford, OH Joe Nuxhall Classic	**L** 5–8	Jacknewitz (1–6)	**Cleary** (1–1)	None		55	16–18	—
April 15	at Tulane	Greer Field at Turchin Stadium • New Orleans, LA	**W** 2–1	**Zellner** (4–2)	Gibbs (3–2)	**Kullman** (1)		2,256	17–18	5–2
April 16	at Tulane	Greer Field at Turchin Stadium • New Orleans, LA	**L** 0–1	Massey (5–2)	**Perez** (4–2)	None		2,249	17–19	5–3
April 17	at Tulane	Greer Field at Turchin Stadium • New Orleans, LA	**W** 7–4	**Yoakam** (2–1)	Massey (3–4)	None		2,244	18–19	6–3
April 19	at Ohio State*	Bill Davis Stadium • Columbus, OH	**L** 0–9	Woodby (5–1)	**Olasz** (1–4)	None		1,006	18–20	—
April 22	Memphis	Marge Schott Stadium • Cincinnati, OH	**W** 1–0	**Zellner** (5–2)	Hathcock (4–5)	None		962	19–20	7–3
April 23	Memphis	Marge Schott Stadium • Cincinnati, OH	**W** 16–4	**Ferguson** (5–2)	Alexander (2–5)	None		947	20–20	8–3
April 24	Memphis	Marge Schott Stadium • Cincinnati, OH	**L** 2–6	Massey (4–4)	**Orndorff** (2–3)	None		668	20–21	8–4
April 29	at East Carolina	Clark–LeClair Stadium • Greenville, NC	**W** 3–0	**Zellner** (6–2)	Kruczynski (5–1)	**Kullman** (2)		2,648	21–21	9–4
April 30	at East Carolina	Clark–LeClair Stadium • Greenville, NC	**L** 4–6	Boyd (6–3)	**Perez** (5–3)	Ingle (9)		2,915	21–22	9–5

May
Date	Opponent	Site/stadium	Score	Win	Loss	Save	TV	Attendance	Overall record	AAC record
May 1	at East Carolina	Clark–LeClair Stadium • Greenville, NC	**T** 3–3 (8)	—	—	None		2,258	21-22-1	9-5-1
May 3	at #7 Louisville*	Jim Patterson Stadium • Louisville, KY	**L** 1–7	McClure (9–0)	**Olasz** (1–5)	None		1,463	21–23–1	—
May 6	at UCF	Jay Bergman Field • Orlando, FL	**L** 7–8	Hukari (2–2)	**Zellner** (6–3)	Thompson (3)		1,025	21–24–1	9–6–1
May 7	at UCF	Jay Bergman Field • Orlando, FL	**L** 1–12	Pimentel (3–6)	**Perez** (5–4)	None		1,121	21–25–1	9–7–1
May 8	at UCF	Jay Bergman Field • Orlando, FL	**W** 4–2	**Orndorff** (3–3)	Finfrock (4–5)	None		932	22–25–1	10–7–1
May 13	Houston	Marge Schott Stadium • Cincinnati, OH	**L** 1–3	Romero (5–4)	Zellner (6–4)	None		713	22–26–1	11–8–1
May 14	Houston	Marge Schott Stadium • Cincinnati, OH	**W** 1–0	**Perez** (6–4)	Ullom (6–3)	None		581	23–26–1	11–8–1
May 15	Houston	Marge Schott Stadium • Cincinnati, OH	**L** 0–4	Cumbie (4–2)	**Orndorff** (3–4)	Maxwell (3)		617	23–27–1	11–9–1
May 13	Western Carolina*	Marge Schott Stadium • Cincinnati, OH	**W** 3–1	**Olasz** (2–5)	Bray (1–4)	**Yoakam** (3)		322	24–27–1	—
May 19	at Memphis	FedExPark • Memphis, TN	**W** 4–2 (10)	**Zellner** (7–4)	Crosby (0–2)	**Kullman** (3)		520	25–27–1	12–9–1
May 20	at Memphis	FedExPark • Memphis, TN	**L** 3–5	Blackwood (2–3)	**Perez** (6–5)	None		412	25–28–1	12–10–1
May 21	at Memphis	FedExPark • Memphis, TN	**W** 4–3	**Kullman** (4–2)	Blackwood (2–4)	None		864	26–28–1	13–10–1

Postseason

AAC Tournament
Date	Opponent	Site/stadium	Score	Win	Loss	Save	TV	Attendance	Overall record	AACT Record
May 24	vs. (5) Houston	Bright House Field • Clearwater, FL	**L** 1–9	Cumbie (5–2)	**Olasz** (2–6)	Hernandez (9)	CBSSN	—	26–29–1	0–1
May 25	vs. (8) UCF	Bright House Field • Clearwater, FL	**L** 6–7 (10)	Hukari (3–3)	**Kullman** (4–3)	None	AACDN	843	26–30–1	0–2

Legend: = Win = Loss = Postponement
Bold = Cincinnati team member

Rankings from Collegiate Baseball; parenthesis indicate tournament seedings.
