= 2026 Oklahoma State Cowboys baseball team =

American college baseball season

2026 Oklahoma State Cowboys baseball

NCAA Tuscaloosa Regional, 2–2
- Conference: Big 12 Conference

Ranking
- D1Baseball.com: No. 25
- Record: 39–22 (18–12 Big 12)
- Head coach: Josh Holliday (14th season)
- Assistant coaches: Blake Hawksworth (1st season); Mark Ginther (3rd season); Victor Romero (3rd season)
- Home stadium: O'Brate Stadium

2026 Big 12 Conference baseball standings
	Conf.				Overall
Team	W		L	PCT	W		L	PCT
No. 12 Kansas ‍†‍‡‍^{y}	22	–	8	.733	45	–	16	.738
No. 4 West Virginia ‍‍‍^{y}	21	–	9	.700	47	–	17	.734
Arizona State ‍‍‍^{y}	19	–	11	.633	39	–	21	.650
UCF ‍‍‍^{y}	19	–	11	.633	32	–	23	.582
No. 25 Oklahoma State ‍‍‍^{y}	18	–	12	.600	39	–	22	.639
Cincinnati ‍‍‍^{y}	17	–	13	.567	38	–	22	.633
TCU ‍‍‍	17	–	13	.567	33	–	21	.611
Baylor ‍‍‍	14	–	16	.467	30	–	27	.526
BYU ‍‍‍	14	–	16	.467	28	–	29	.491
Utah ‍‍‍	12	–	18	.400	26	–	25	.510
Kansas State ‍‍‍	11	–	19	.367	30	–	27	.526
Texas Tech ‍‍‍	10	–	20	.333	27	–	28	.491
Arizona ‍‍‍	9	–	21	.300	19	–	34	.358
Houston ‍‍‍	7	–	23	.233	24	–	31	.436
† – Conference champion ‡ – Tournament champion y – Invited to the NCAA tournament As of May 20, 2026; Rankings from D1baseball

The 2026 Oklahoma State Cowboys baseball team represented Oklahoma State University during the 2026 NCAA Division I baseball season. The Cowboys play their home games at O'Brate Stadium as a member of the Big 12 Conference. They were led by head coach Josh Holliday, in his 14th season at Oklahoma State.

== Previous season ==
Oklahoma State is coming off of a 30–25 (15–12) season. The team finished seventh in the Big 12 Conference and went 1–1 in the 2025 Big 12 Conference baseball tournament. The Pokes earned an at-large berth into the 2025 NCAA Division I baseball tournament, where they were the three seed in the Athens Regional. The Pokes played all three teams in the regional, beating Binghamton and hosts, Georgia, but losing twice to the regional champions, Duke.

Starting pitcher, Harrison Bodendorf, was named to the All-Big 12 First-Team. Swingman, Sean Youngerman, was named to the All-Big 12 Second-Team. During the 2025 MLB draft, Nolan Schubart was the first Poke to selected, being selected in the third round with the 101st overall pick by the Cleveland Guardians. Youngerman was picked in the fourth round by the Philadelphia Phillies. Bodendorf was taken by the Guardians in the 10th round. Additionally, right-handed pitcher, Gabe Davis was selected by the Chicago White Sox in the fifth round, and infielder, Brayden Smith, was taken by the Baltimore Orioles in the 13th round, although he was shortly traded to the St. Louis Cardinals.

== Preseason ==
=== Big 12 Baseball Preseason Poll ===
The Big 12 Baseball Preseason Poll was released on February 5, 2026. Oklahoma State was voted to finish fifth in the Big 12.

Big 12 Baseball Preseason Poll
Predicted finish	Team	Votes (1st place)
1	TCU	169 (13)
2	Arizona	157 (1)
3	West Virginia	137
4	Arizona State	128
T–5	Kansas	112
T–5	Oklahoma State	112
7	Kansas State	87
8	Cincinnati	85
9	Texas Tech	78
10	UCF	66
11	Baylor	54
12	Houston	42
13	BYU	29
14	Utah	18

== Personnel ==
=== Starters ===
Lineup
Pos.	No.	Player.	Year
C	4	Campbell Smithwick	Junior
1B	12	Colin Brueggemann	Senior
2B	5	Garrett Shull	Sophomore
3B	2	Aidan Meola	Senior
SS	1	Brock Thompson	Sophomore
LF	14	Alex Conover	Junior
CF	13	Kollin Ritchie	Junior
RF	9	Danny Wallace	Freshman
DH	7	Avery Ortiz	Junior

Weekend pitching rotation
Day	No.	Player.	Year
Friday	66	Mario Pesca	Senior
Saturday	16	Ethan Lund	Sophomore
Sunday	36	Hudson Barrett	Junior

=== Roster ===
2026 Oklahoma State Cowboys baseball team
Players
Coaches

#	Pos.	Name	B/T	Height	Weight	Year	Home town
1	INF	Brock Thompson	L/R	6 ft 0 in (1.83 m)	187 lb (85 kg)	So	Bakersfield, CA
2	INF	Aidan Meola	R/R	6 ft 2 in (1.88 m)	215 lb (98 kg)	Gr	Palm Beach Gardens, FL
3	INF	Terrance Bowen	R/R	6 ft 2 in (1.88 m)	205 lb (93 kg)	Fr	Dallas, GA
4	C	Campbell Smithwick	L/R	6 ft 0 in (1.83 m)	192 lb (87 kg)	Jr	Oxford, MS
5	OF	Garrett Shull	S/R	6 ft 2 in (1.88 m)	207 lb (94 kg)	So	Enid, OK
6	OF	Remo Indomenico	L/L	5 ft 10 in (1.78 m)	181 lb (82 kg)	Fr	Chicago, IL
7	INF	Avery Ortiz	R/R	5 ft 11 in (1.8 m)	190 lb (86 kg)	Jr	Tulsa, OK
8	UTL	TP Wentworth	L/L	6 ft 5 in (1.96 m)	242 lb (110 kg)	Jr	Ripon, CA
9	OF	Danny Wallace	R/R	5 ft 10 in (1.78 m)	197 lb (89 kg)	Fr	La Vista, NE
10	LHP	Bryce LeBlanc	L/L	6 ft 7 in (2.01 m)	233 lb (106 kg)	So	Lubbock, TX
12	INF	Colin Brueggemann	L/R	6 ft 6 in (1.98 m)	246 lb (112 kg)	Gr	Smithton, IL
13	OF	Kollin Ritchie	L/R	6 ft 2 in (1.88 m)	228 lb (103 kg)	Jr	Atoka, OK
14	INF	Alex Conover	L/R	6 ft 4 in (1.93 m)	202 lb (92 kg)	Jr	Tuttle, OK
15	UTL	Sebastian Norman	R/R	6 ft 0 in (1.83 m)	258 lb (117 kg)	Fr	Springfield, MO
16	LHP	Ethan Lund	R/L	6 ft 6 in (1.98 m)	210 lb (95 kg)	So	Fishers, IN
17	OF	Ezra Essex	R/R	5 ft 7 in (1.7 m)	176 lb (80 kg)	Fr	Chicago, IL
18	RHP	Kai Fyke	R/R	6 ft 2 in (1.88 m)	208 lb (94 kg)	Jr	Langley, BC, CAN
19	RHP	Stormy Rhodes	R/R	6 ft 4 in (1.93 m)	197 lb (89 kg)	So	Kerrville, TX
22	UTL	Evan Saunders	R/R	6 ft 3 in (1.91 m)	222 lb (101 kg)	Jr	St. Michael, MN
23	OF	Cole Pladson	L/R	5 ft 10 in (1.78 m)	201 lb (91 kg)	Fr	Clay Center, KS
24	C	Quinn Schambow	R/R	6 ft 0 in (1.83 m)	225 lb (102 kg)	Fr	Libertyville, IL
25	INF	Ty Kennedy	R/R	5 ft 10 in (1.78 m)	186 lb (84 kg)	Fr	Orlando, FL
26	RHP	Noah Wech	R/R	6 ft 1 in (1.85 m)	205 lb (93 kg)	So	Manitowoc, WI
27	RHP	Matthew Brown	R/R	6 ft 5 in (1.96 m)	214 lb (97 kg)	So	Carlisle, ON, CAN
28	LHP	Brennan Phillips	L/L	6 ft 1 in (1.85 m)	195 lb (88 kg)	Sr	Owasso, OK
30	C	Brady Francisco	R/R	5 ft 9 in (1.75 m)	196 lb (89 kg)	So	Simi Valley, FL
32	LHP	Drew Blake	L/L	6 ft 2 in (1.88 m)	192 lb (87 kg)	Jr	Stillwater, OK
33	RHP	Lucas Glendinning	R/R	6 ft 5 in (1.96 m)	229 lb (104 kg)	Jr	Viera, FL
35	RHP	Jake Kennedy	R/R	6 ft 2 in (1.88 m)	193 lb (88 kg)	So	Hennessey, OK
36	LHP	Hudson Barrett	L/L	6 ft 5 in (1.96 m)	232 lb (105 kg)	Jr	Bakersfield, CA
37	LHP	Kyler Zagar	L/L	6 ft 2 in (1.88 m)	204 lb (93 kg)	So	Perry, OK
38	LHP	Gaige Albright	L/L	6 ft 2 in (1.88 m)	197 lb (89 kg)	Fr	Choctaw, OK
40	RHP	Caden Sramek	R/R	6 ft 7 in (2.01 m)	225 lb (102 kg)	Fr	Simi Valley, CA
41	RHP	Parker Jennings	R/R	6 ft 4 in (1.93 m)	172 lb (78 kg)	Fr	Granite Bay, CA
44	RHP	Zane Burns	R/R	6 ft 1 in (1.85 m)	191 lb (87 kg)	Fr	Chandler, AZ
45	UTL	Deacon Pomeroy	R/R	6 ft 4 in (1.93 m)	230 lb (104 kg)	Fr	Topeka, KS
48	RHP	Drew Winslow	R/R	6 ft 5 in (1.96 m)	230 lb (104 kg)	Fr	Troy, IL
53	RHP	Kyle Pearcy	R/R	6 ft 3 in (1.91 m)	199 lb (90 kg)	Fr	Kansas City, MO
56	RHP	Cael Turner	R/R	6 ft 3 in (1.91 m)	207 lb (94 kg)	Fr	Cabot, AR
66	RHP	Mario Pesca	R/R	6 ft 8 in (2.03 m)	236 lb (107 kg)	Sr	The Bronx, NY
77	RHP	Hunter Watkins	R/R	6 ft 9 in (2.06 m)	230 lb (104 kg)	Jr	Simi Valley, CA

Head coach

Josh Holliday

Assistant coach(es)

Rob Walton
Mark Ginther
Victor Romero

Legend

- (C) Team captain
- (S) Suspended
- (I) Ineligible
- Injured
- Current redshirt

Roster
Last update: December 8, 2024

=== Coaching staff ===
2026 Oklahoma State Cowboys baseball coaching staff
Name	Position	Seasons at OSU	Alma mater
Josh Holliday	Head coach	14	Oklahoma State University (1999)
Blake Hawksworth	Pitching coach	1	Grand Canyon University (2021)
Mark Ginther	Assistant coach	3	Oklahoma State University (2012)
Victor Romero	Assistant coach	3	Oklahoma State University (2013)

== Offseason ==
=== Departures ===
Offseason departures
Name	Number	Pos.	Height	Weight	Year	Hometown	Notes
Ian Daugherty	8	C	6 ft 2 in (1.88 m)	212 pounds (96 kg)	Senior	Kingfisher, OK	Signed by Minnesota Twins
Nolan Schubart	10	C	6 ft 5 in (1.96 m)	223 pounds (101 kg)	Junior	Durand, MI	Signed by Cleveland Guardians
Harrison Bodendorf	15	LHP	6 ft 5 in (1.96 m)	186 pounds (84 kg)	Junior	Temecula, CA	Signed by Cleveland Guardians
Gabe Davis	22	RHP	6 ft 9 in (2.06 m)	217 pounds (98 kg)	Junior	Choctaw, OK	Signed by Chicago White Sox
Ryan Ure	24	LHP	6 ft 8 in (2.03 m)	235 pounds (107 kg)	Junior	Eaton, CO	Signed by Kansas City Royals
Ben Reiland	25	INF/OF	5 ft 11 in (1.80 m)	170 pounds (77 kg)	Freshman	Villa Park, CA	Did not return
Ryan Ure	33	RHP	6 ft 3 in (1.91 m)	225 pounds (102 kg)	Junior	Valencia, CA	Signed by Philadelphia Phillies
Thomas Lieb	38	C	5 ft 11 in (1.80 m)	192 pounds (87 kg)	Freshman	Shadow Hills, CA	Did not return
Brex Caldwell	39	RHP	6 ft 2 in (1.88 m)	220 pounds (100 kg)	Freshman	Shady Point, OK	Did not return
Tommy Allman	44	RHP	6 ft 2 in (1.88 m)	195 pounds (88 kg)	Senior	Farmington Hills, MI	Graduated
Kyle Landry	45	RHP	6 ft 3 in (1.91 m)	210 pounds (95 kg)	Senior	Oklahoma City, OK	Graduated
Aaron Weber	48	RHP	6 ft 5 in (1.96 m)	223 pounds (101 kg)	Senior	Edmond, OK	Graduated
Blake Julius	52	RHP	6 ft 6 in (1.98 m)	215 pounds (98 kg)	Freshman	Mansfield, TX	Did not return
Bowen Bridges	53	RHP	6 ft 1 in (1.85 m)	206 pounds (93 kg)	Junior	Edmond, OK	Did not return

==== Outgoing transfers ====
Outgoing transfers
Name	Number	Pos.	Height	Weight	Hometown	Year	New school
Donovan LaSalle	3	OF	6 ft 2 in (1.88 m)	195 pounds (88 kg)	Lake Charles, LA	Sophomore	Louisiana
Drew Culbertson	6	INF	6 ft 0 in (1.83 m)	170 pounds (77 kg)	Greenwood, IN	Sophomore	Michigan
Elijah Alexander	17	OF	6 ft 2 in (1.88 m)	195 pounds (88 kg)	Moore, OK	Junior	Central Oklahoma
Beau Sylvester	18	INF	6 ft 0 in (1.83 m)	201 pounds (91 kg)	Kailua, HI	Sophomore	Arizona
Jayson Jones	23	INF/OF	6 ft 2 in (1.88 m)	204 pounds (93 kg)	Savannah, TX	Junior	Wichita State
Braylon Brooks	30	INF	5 ft 9 in (1.75 m)	180 pounds (82 kg)	Tuttle, OK	Freshman	Johnson County (Note: Junior college)
Charlie Carter	34	C	6 ft 3 in (1.91 m)	201 pounds (91 kg)	Little Rock, AR	Sophomore	Missouri State
Cale Sudderth	40	LHP	6 ft 3 in (1.91 m)	225 pounds (102 kg)	Ardmore, OK	Freshman	Johnson County
Kash Ferris	41	RHP	6 ft 2 in (1.88 m)	200 pounds (91 kg)	Midwest City, OK	Freshman	Oral Roberts
Jett Hope	42	RHP	6 ft 4 in (1.93 m)	205 pounds (93 kg)	Bixby, OK	Freshman	Austin Peay
Kyle Bade	56	LHP	5 ft 10 in (1.78 m)	170 pounds (77 kg)	Plano, TX	Sophomore	San Diego

==== 2025 MLB draft ====
Round	Pick	Overall pick	Player	Position	MLB team
3	27	101	Nolan Schubart	OF	Cleveland Guardians
4	26	131	Sean Youngerman	RHP	Philadelphia Phillies
5	1	137	Gabe Davis	RHP	Chicago White Sox
10	27	312	Harrison Bodendorf	LHP	Cleveland Guardians
13	19	394	Brayden Smith	2B	Baltimore Orioles

=== Acquisitions ===
==== Incoming transfers ====
Incoming transfers
Name	Number	Pos.	Height	Weight	Hometown	Year	Previous school
Campbell Smithwick	4	C	6 ft 0 in (1.83 m)	192 pounds (87 kg)	Oxford, MS	Junior	Ole Miss
TP Wentworth	8	INF	6 ft 5 in (1.96 m)	242 pounds (110 kg)	Ripon, CA	Sophomore	Clemson
Bryce LeBlanc	10	LHP	6 ft 7 in (2.01 m)	233 pounds (106 kg)	Lubbock, TX	Sophomore	Odessa
Kai Fyke	18	RHP	6 ft 2 in (1.88 m)	208 pounds (94 kg)	Langley, BC, CAN	Junior	Central Arizona
Evan Saunders	17	INF/OF	6 ft 3 in (1.91 m)	222 pounds (101 kg)	St. Michael, MN	Junior	Iowa Western
Brady Francisco	30	C	5 ft 9 in (1.75 m)	196 pounds (89 kg)	Simi Valley, CA	Sophomore	Yavapai
Lucas Glendinning	33	RHP	6 ft 5 in (1.96 m)	229 pounds (104 kg)	Viera, FL	Junior	Indian River State
Josiah Golden	34	RHP	6 ft 0 in (1.83 m)	204 pounds (93 kg)	Higginsville, MO	Junior	Johnson County
Hudson Barrett	36	LHP	6 ft 5 in (1.96 m)	232 pounds (105 kg)	Bakersfield, CA	Junior	UCSB
Kyle Zagar	37	LHP	6 ft 2 in (1.88 m)	204 pounds (93 kg)	Perry, OK	Sophomore	Cowley

==== Incoming recruits ====
2025 Oklahoma State Recruits
Number	Pos.	Name	B/T	Height	Weight	Hometown	High School
3	INF	Terrance Brown	R/R	6 ft 2 in (1.88 m)	205 pounds (93 kg)	Dallas, GA	Blessed Trinity Catholic
6	OF	Remo Indomenico	L/L	5 ft 10 in (1.78 m)	181 pounds (82 kg)	Chicago, IL	The First Academy
9	OF	Danny Wallace	R/R	5 ft 10 in (1.78 m)	197 pounds (89 kg)	La Vista, NE	Papillion-La Vista South
15	UTL	Sebastian Norman	R/R	6 ft 0 in (1.83 m)	258 pounds (117 kg)	Springfield, MO	Glendale (MO)
17	OF	Ezra Essex	R/R	5 ft 7 in (1.70 m)	176 pounds (80 kg)	Chicago, IL	P27 Academy
23	OF	Cole Pladson	L/R	5 ft 0 in (1.52 m)	201 pounds (91 kg)	Clay Center, KS	Clay Center
24	C	Quinn Schambow	R/R	6 ft 0 in (1.83 m)	225 pounds (102 kg)	Libertyville, IL	Libertyville
25	INF	Ty Kennedy	R/R	5 ft 10 in (1.78 m)	186 pounds (84 kg)	Orlando, FL	East River
38	LHP	Gaige Albright	L/L	6 ft 2 in (1.88 m)	197 pounds (89 kg)	Choctaw, OK	Choctaw
40	RHP	Caden Sramek	R/R	6 ft 7 in (2.01 m)	225 pounds (102 kg)	Simi Valley, CA	Royal (CA)
41	RHP	Parker Jennings	R/R	6 ft 4 in (1.93 m)	172 pounds (78 kg)	Granite Bay, CA	IMG Academy
44	RHP	Zane Burns	R/R	6 ft 1 in (1.85 m)	191 pounds (87 kg)	Chandler, AZ	Corona del Sol
45	UTL	Deacon Pomeroy	R/R	6 ft 4 in (1.93 m)	230 pounds (100 kg)	Topeka, KS	Shawnee Heights
48	RHP	Drew Winslow	R/R	6 ft 5 in (1.96 m)	230 pounds (100 kg)	Troy, IL	Triad (IL)
53	RHP	Kyle Pearcy	R/R	6 ft 3 in (1.91 m)	199 pounds (90 kg)	Kansas City, MO	Staley (KS)
56	RHP	Cael Turner	R/R	6 ft 3 in (1.91 m)	207 pounds (94 kg)	Cabot, AR	Cabot

== Game log ==
2026 Oklahoma State Cowboys baseball game log
(Overall: 39–22; Conference: 17–12); (Home: 22–6; Away: 12–12; Neutral: 5–4)
Regular season (36–19)
February (7–3)
(Home: 3–0; Away: 3–1; Neutral: 1–2)

Date	Time (CST)	Opponent	Rank	TV	Venue	Score	Win	Loss	Save	Attendance	Overall record	B12 record
Shriners Children's College Showdown
February 13	7:00 p.m.	vs. No. 5 Arkansas*		FloSports	Globe Life Field; Arlington, TX	**L** 2–12^{(8)}	Gibler (1–0)	**Barrett** (0–1)	—	18,387	0–1	—
February 14	3:15 p.m.	vs. No. 19 Oklahoma*		FloSports	Globe Life Field	**L** 1–10	Mercurius (1–0)	**Pesca** (0–1)	—	22,384	0–2	—
February 15	10:35 a.m.	vs. No. 23 Vanderbilt*		FloSports	Globe Life Field	**W** 11–1^{(8)}	**Wech** (1–0)	Taylor (0–1)	—	16,951	1–2	—
February 19	7:00 p.m.	at Grand Canyon*		MWN	Brazzell Field; Phoenix, AZ	**L** 8–12	Lee (1–0)	**LeBlanc** (0–1)	Gregory (1)	691	1–3	—
February 20	7:00 p.m.	at Grand Canyon*		MWN	Brazell Field	**W** 9–1	**Barrett** (1–1)	Ahern (0–1)	—	909	2–3	—
February 21	3:30 p.m.	at Grand Canyon*		MWN	Brazell Field	**W** 10–7	**Fyke** (1–0)	Frey (0–2)	**Wech** (1)	751	3–3	—
February 22	2:00 p.m.	at Grand Canyon*		MWN	Brazell Field	**W** 13–2^{(7)}	**Lund** (1–0)	Robb (0–1)	—	718	4–3	—
February 24	4:00 p.m.	Central Arkansas*		B12N+	O'Brate Stadium; Stillwater, OK	**W** 14–3^{(7)}	**Wentworth** (1–0)	Pannell (0–1)	—	4,570	5–3	—
February 27	4:00 p.m.	Sam Houston*		B12N+	O'Brate Stadium	**W** 5–1	**Barrett** (2–1)	Peterson (0–2)	—	4,825	6–3	—
February 28	1:05 p.m.	Sam Houston*		B12N+	O'Brate Stadium	**W** 20–0	**Lund** (2–0)	Ryden (1–2)	—	4,862	7–3	—

March (11–8)
(Home: 9–2; Away: 2–6; Neutral: 0–0)

Date	Time (CDT)	Opponent	Rank	TV	Venue	Score	Win	Loss	Save	Attendance	Overall record	B12 record
March 1	1:05 p.m.	Sam Houston*		B12N+	O'Brate Stadium	**W** 1–0	**Rhodes** (1–0)	Neuenschwander (0–1)	**Wech** (2)	3,973	8–3	—
March 3	4:05 p.m.	Missouri State*		B12N+	O'Brate Stadium	**W** 8–7	**Phillips** (1–0)	Charlton (1–1)	**Wech** (3)	4,218	9–3	—
March 6	6:05 p.m.	Gardner–Webb*		B12N+	O'Brate Stadium	**L** 5–19^{(7)}	Ellison (3–0)	**Leblanc** (0–2)	—	4,292	9–4	—
March 7	2:05 p.m.	Gardner–Webb*		B12N+	O'Brate Stadium	**W** 4–2	**Lund** (3–0)	Stuart (1–1)	**Wech** (4)	3,724	10–4	—
March 8	1:05 p.m.	Gardner–Webb*		B12N+	O'Brate Stadium	**W** 16–1^{(7)}	**Pesca** (1–1)	Bertram (2–1)	—	3,907	11–4	—
March 10	6:05 p.m.	Dallas Baptist*		ESPN+	O'Brate Stadium	**W** 6–5^{(10)}	**Wech** (2–0)	Long (1–3)	—	4,717	12–4	—
March 13	5:05 p.m.	at No. 22 UCF		ESPN+	John Euliano Park; Orlando, FL	**L** 11–12	Gray (2–0)	**Phillips** (1–1)	Sosnowski (1)	1,812	12–5	0–1
March 14	5:05 p.m.	at No. 22 UCF		ESPN+	John Euliano Park	**L** 1–6	Sauser (2–0)	**Pesca** (1–2)	—	2,008	12–6	0–2
March 15	11:05 a.m.	at No. 22 UCF		ESPN+	John Euliano Park	**L** 5–6	Lariz (2–0)	**Wech** (2–1)	—	1,538	12–7	0–3
March 17	6:00 p.m.	South Dakota State*		B12N+	O'Brate Stadium	**W** 7–6	**Winslow** (1–0)	Sjuts (0–2)	**Fyke** (1)	4,159	13–7	—
March 18	4:00 p.m.	South Dakota State*		B12N+	O'Brate Stadium	**W** 12–11	**Zagar** (1–0)	Henry (0–2)	—	3,946	14–7	—
March 20	6:00 p.m.	Baylor		B12N+	O'Brate Stadium	**L** 4–6	Ruais (2–1)	**Rhodes** (1–1)	Bunch (31)	4,283	14–8	0–4
March 21	6:00 p.m.	Baylor		B12N+	O'Brate Stadium	**W** 5–3	**Pesca** (1–0)	Wallace (2–1)	**Rhodes** (1)	4,389	15–8	1–4
March 22	1:00 p.m.	Baylor		B12N+	O'Brate Stadium	**W** 13–6	**Burns** (1–0)	Calder (1–3)	—	4,222	16–8	2–4
March 24	3:05 p.m.	at Missouri State*		ESPN+	Route 66 Stadium; Springfield, MO	**L** 2–16^{(7)}	Knight (3–0)	**Phillips** (1–2)	—	715	16–9	—
March 26	7:05 p.m.	at BYU		B12N+	Larry H. Miller Field; Provo, UT	**L** 5–6^{(10)}	Gray (3–5)	**Wech** (2–2)	—	1,878	16–10	2–5
March 27	7:05 p.m.	at BYU		B12N+	Larry H. Miller Field	**W** 12–5	**Pesca** (3–2)	Crane (0–2)	—	1,606	17–10	3–5
March 28	2:05 p.m.	at BYU		B12N+	Larry H. Miller Field	**L** 4–5	Gray (4–5)	**Wech** (2–3)	—	2,457	17–11	3–6
March 31	6:30 p.m.	at Dallas Baptist*		ESPN+	Horner Ballpark; Dallas, TX	**W** 12–5	**Fyke** (2–0)	Smith (2–3)	—	1,082	18–11	—

April (10–6)
(Home; 5–3; Away: 4–3; Neutral: 1–0)

Date	Time (CDT)	Opponent	Rank	TV	Venue	Score	Win	Loss	Save	Attendance	Overall record	B12 record
April 3	1:05 p.m.	Cincinnati		B12N+	O'Brate Stadium	**W** 12–9	**Kennedy** (1–0)	Buczkowski (2–1)	**Wech** (5)	3,871	19–11	4–6
April 4	6:05 p.m.	Cincinnati		B12N+	O'Brate Stadium	**W** 11–3	**Pesca** (4–2)	Brouwer (2–3)	**Rhodes** (2)	4,212	20–11	5–6
April 4	1:05 p.m.	Cincinnati		B12N+	O'Brate Stadium	**W** 10–4	**Kennedy** (2–0)	Knight (2–3)	**Rhodes** (2)	3,810	21–11	6–6
April 7	6:05 p.m.	Oral Roberts*		ESPN+	O'Brate Stadium	**L** 9–10	Ferris (1–2)	**Wech** (2–4)	Hill (3)	5,817	21–12	—
April 10	1:05 p.m.	at Kansas State		B12N+	Tointon Family Stadium; Manhattan, KS	**L** 3–11	Guyette (5–1)	**Lund** (3–1)	—	2,147	21–13	6–7
April 11	6:05 p.m.	at Kansas State		B12N+	Tointon Family Stadium	**L** 9–13	Arther (2–1)	**Rhodes** (1–2)	—	2,344	21–14	6–8
April 12	1:05 p.m.	at Kansas State		B12N+	Tointon Family Stadium	**W** 12–10^{(13)}	**Jennings** (1–0)	Smith (1–2)	—	2,101	22–14	7–8
Bedlam Series
April 14	7:05 p.m.	vs. No. 14 Oklahoma*		SECN	ONEOK Field; Tulsa, OK	**W** 7–3^{(8)}	**Phillips** (2–2)	Catalano (3–3)	—	4,901	23–14	—
April 17	1:05 p.m.	No. 18 Kansas		B12N+	O'Brate Stadium	**W** 13–2^{(8)}	**Rhodes** (2–2)	Nayral (4–2)	—	4,000	24–14	8–8
April 18	6:05 p.m.	No. 18 Kansas		B12N+	O'Brate Stadium	**L** 3–13	Voegele (4–2)	**Pesca** (4–3)	—	8,456	24–15	8–9
April 19	1:05 p.m.	No. 18 Kansas		B12N+	O'Brate Stadium	**L** 6–9	Ritter (5–1)	**Blake** (0–1)	Rahe (5)	4,544	24–16	8–10
April 21	6:00 p.m.	Wichita State*		ESPN+	O'Brate Stadium	**W** 14–4^{(7)}	**Burns** (2–0)	Hayashi (0–1)	—	4,326	25–16	—
April 24	1:05 p.m.	at Texas Tech		B12N+	Rip Griffin Park; Lubbock, TX	**W** 16–6^{(7)}	**Lund** (4–1)	Lowe (1–1)	—	3,547	26–16	9–10
April 25	1:05 p.m.	at Texas Tech		B12N+	Rip Griffin Park	**W** 9–8	**Barrett** (3–1)	Addison (0–1)	—	3,910	27–16	10–10
April 26	11:05 a.m.	at Texas Tech		B12N+	Rip Griffin Park	**W** 11–2	**Phillips** (3–2)	Hayes (2–3)	—	3,511	28–16	11–10
April 28	6:35 p.m.	at Oral Roberts*		ESPN+	J. L. Johnson Stadium; Tulsa, OK	**L** 6–11	Asher (1–3)	**Burns** (2–1)	—	1,932	28–17	—

May (8–2)
(Home; 5–1; Away: 3–1; Neutral: 0–0)

Date	Time (CDT)	Opponent	Rank	TV	Venue	Score	Win	Loss	Save	Attendance	Overall record	B12 record
May 1	6:00 p.m.	TCU		B12N+	O'Brate Stadium	**W** 7–6	**Barrett** (4–1)	Stern (2–1)	—	4,073	29–17	12–10
May 2	6:00 p.m.	TCU		ESPN+	O'Brate Stadium	**W** 9–2	**Pesca** (5–3)	Lapour (0–1)	—	4,623	30–17	13–10
May 3	1:00 p.m.	TCU		ESPN+	O'Brate Stadium	**W** 11–10	**Burns** (3–1)	Stern (2–2)	**Wech** (6)	4,287	31–17	14–10
May 8	8:05 p.m.	at No. 17 Arizona State*	No. 25	ESPN2	Phoenix Municipal Stadium; Tempe, AZ	**W** 9–6	**Barrett** (5–1)	Schaefer (1–2)	**Pesca** (1)	3,636	32–17	15–10
May 9	8:05 p.m.	at No. 17 Arizona State*	No. 25	ESPN2	Phoenix Municipal Stadium	**W** 13–6	**Rhodes** (3–2)	Alba (2–1)	—	3,754	33–17	16–10
May 10	3:05 p.m.	at No. 17 Arizona State*	No. 25	B12N	Phoenix Municipal Stadium	**L** 7–11	Klecker (6–2)	**Phillips** (3–3)	—	2,910	33–18	16–11
May 12	6:00 p.m.	at Oral Roberts*	No. 21		J. L. Johnson Stadium	**W** 12–9	**Kennedy** (3–0)	Christensen (0–1)	—	2,189	34–18	—
May 14	6:00 p.m.	Arizona	No. 21	ESPN+	O'Brate Stadium	**L** 4–7	Kling (2–1)	**Pesca** (5–4)	None	4,511	34–19	16–12
May 15	6:00 p.m.	Arizona	No. 21	ESPN+	O'Brate Stadium	**W** 13–1^{(7)}	**Lund** (5–1)	Kramkowski (1–8)	None	4,496	35–19	17–12
May 16	12:00 p.m.	Arizona	No. 21	ESPN+	O'Brate Stadium	**W** 7–5	**Rhodes** (4–2)	McKinney (3–7)	**Pesca** (2)	4,290	36–19	18–12

Postseason (3–3)
Big 12 tournament (1–1)

Date	Time (CDT)	Opponent	Rank	TV	Venue	Score	Win	Loss	Save	Attendance	Overall record	Tournament record
May 21	11:00 a.m.	vs. (4) UCF	No. 19 (5)	ESPNU	Surprise Stadium; Surprise, AZ	**W** 12–6	**Pesca** (6–4)	Rosado (0–3)	None		37–19	1–0
May 22	6:30 p.m.	vs. No. 13 (1) Kansas	No. 19 (5)	ESPN+	Surprise Stadium	**L** 2–9	Cook (5–1)	**Lund** (5–2)	Ritter (2)		37–20	1–1

Tuscaloosa Regional (2–2)

Date	Time (CDT)	Opponent	Rank	TV	Venue	Score	Win	Loss	Save	Attendance	Overall record	Regional record
May 29	1:00 p.m.	vs. (3) USC Upstate	No. 19 (2)	ESPN+	Sewell–Thomas Stadium	**L** 5–8	Stukes (8–3)	**Lund** (5–3)	Kirby (3)		37–21	0–1
May 30	1:00 p.m.	vs. (4) Alabama State	No. 19 (2)	ESPN+	Sewell–Thomas Stadium	**W** 8–7^{(11)}	**Pesca** (7–4)	Sanders (0–3)	None	3,011	38–21	1–1
May 31	2:00 p.m.	vs. (3) USC Upstate	No. 19 (2)	ESPN+	Sewell–Thomas Stadium	**W** 12–1	**Barrett** (6–1)	Eichenberger (1–3)	None	2,909	39–21	2–1
May 31	7:00 p.m.	at No. 16 (1) Alabama	No. 19 (2)	ESPN+	Sewell–Thomas Stadium	**L** 7–9^{(11)}	Banks (2–0)	**Pesca** (7–5)	None	3,768	39–22	2–2

"#" represents ranking. All rankings from D1Baseball Poll on the date of the contest.
"()" represents postseason seeding in the B12 Tournament or NCAA Regional, respectively.
= Win, = Loss, = Canceled/Postponed
Bold = **Oklahoma State team member**
* = Non-Conference Game
Schedule Source:

== Rankings ==
Ranking movements Legend: ██ Increase in ranking ██ Decrease in ranking — = Not ranked RV = Received votes
	Week																	
Poll	Pre	1	2	3	4	5	6	7	8	9	10	11	12	13	14	15	16	Final
Coaches'	RV	RV*	RV	RV	RV	—	RV	—	RV	—	—	RV	RV	23	21	21	21*	RV
Baseball America	—	—	—	—	—	—	—	—	—	—	—	—	25	21	19	19*	19*	—
NCBWA†	RV	—	—	—	—	RV	RV	RV	RV	RV	—	—	RV	22	20	20*	RV	RV
D1Baseball	—	—	—	—	—	—	—	—	—	—	—	—	—	21	19	19	19*	25
Perfect Game	—	—	—	—	—	—	—	—	—	—	—	—	—	23	21	21*	21*	—

† NCBWA ranks 30 teams in their preseason poll, but only ranks 25 teams weekly during the season.
* A new poll was not released for this week, so for comparison purposes, the previous week's ranking is inserted in this week's slot.
