= 2026 Cincinnati Bearcats baseball team =

American college baseball season

2026 Cincinnati Bearcats baseball

Starkville Regional, 1–2
- Conference: Big 12 Conference

Ranking
- Coaches: No. 24
- D1Baseball.com: No. 24
- Record: 38–22 (17–13 Big 12)
- Head coach: Jordan Bischel (3rd season)
- Assistant coaches: Kyle Pettoruto (3rd season); Tayler Sheriff (3rd season); Tom Winske (3rd season)
- Home stadium: UC Baseball Stadium

2026 Big 12 Conference baseball standings
	Conf.				Overall
Team	W		L	PCT	W		L	PCT
No. 12 Kansas ‍†‍‡‍^{y}	22	–	8	.733	45	–	16	.738
No. 4 West Virginia ‍‍‍^{y}	21	–	9	.700	47	–	17	.734
Arizona State ‍‍‍^{y}	19	–	11	.633	39	–	21	.650
UCF ‍‍‍^{y}	19	–	11	.633	32	–	23	.582
No. 25 Oklahoma State ‍‍‍^{y}	18	–	12	.600	39	–	22	.639
Cincinnati ‍‍‍^{y}	17	–	13	.567	38	–	22	.633
TCU ‍‍‍	17	–	13	.567	33	–	21	.611
Baylor ‍‍‍	14	–	16	.467	30	–	27	.526
BYU ‍‍‍	14	–	16	.467	28	–	29	.491
Utah ‍‍‍	12	–	18	.400	26	–	25	.510
Kansas State ‍‍‍	11	–	19	.367	30	–	27	.526
Texas Tech ‍‍‍	10	–	20	.333	27	–	28	.491
Arizona ‍‍‍	9	–	21	.300	19	–	34	.358
Houston ‍‍‍	7	–	23	.233	24	–	31	.436
† – Conference champion ‡ – Tournament champion y – Invited to the NCAA tournament As of May 20, 2026; Rankings from D1baseball

The 2026 Cincinnati Bearcats baseball team represent the University of Cincinnati during the 2026 NCAA Division I baseball season. The Bearcats play their home games at UC Baseball Stadium as a member of the Big 12 Conference. They are led by head coach Jordan Bischel in his third season at Cincinnati.

== Previous season ==
In 2025, the Bearcats finished 8th in the Big 12 with a record of 31–23, 16–14 in conference play. As the 8th seed in the Big 12 tournament, they beat 9th seeded Texas Tech 6–5, before losing to rival and top seeded West Virginia. They accepted a bid to the 2025 NCAA Tournament, playing as a 3 seed in the Knoxville Regional, hosted by Tennessee. The Bearcats beat Wake Forest in the first round, before losing to Tennessee in the second round, and to Wake Forest in the second chance game. Overall, the Bearcats finished with a record of 1–2 in the NCAA tournament.

== Preseason ==
=== Big 12 Baseball Preseason Poll ===
The Big 12 Baseball Preseason Poll was released on February 05, 2026. Cincinnati was voted to finish eighth in the Big 12.

Big 12 Baseball Preseason Poll
Predicted finish	Team	Votes (1st place)
1	TCU	169 (13)
2	Arizona	157 (1)
3	West Virginia	137
4	Arizona State	128
T–5	Kansas	112
T–5	Oklahoma State	112
7	Kansas State	87
8	Cincinnati	85
9	Texas Tech	78
10	UCF	66
11	Baylor	54
12	Houston	42
13	BYU	29
14	Utah	18

=== Preseason Big 12 awards and honors ===
Big 12 Preseason All-Big 12
Player	Position
Jack Natili	C
Nathan Taylor	SP

== Personnel ==
=== Roster ===
2026 Cincinnati Bearcats baseball team
Players
Coaches

#	Pos.	Name	B/T	Height	Weight	Year	Home town
0	C	Parker McDaniels	R/R	6 ft 1 in (1.85 m)	215 lb (98 kg)	So	Delaware, OH
3		Christian Mitchelle	R/R	5 ft 11 in (1.8 m)	200 lb (91 kg)	Sr	Romeoville, IL
4	OF	Conlan Daniel	R/R	6 ft 0 in (1.83 m)	190 lb (86 kg)	So	Cincinnati, OH
5	INF	Jackson Reardon	R/R	6 ft 3 in (1.91 m)	200 lb (91 kg)	Fr	Hebron, KY
6	INF	Luke Sefcik	R/R	5 ft 10 in (1.78 m)	180 lb (82 kg)	RS Jr	Palos Heights, IL
7	C	Jack Natili	R/R	6 ft 3 in (1.91 m)	198 lb (90 kg)	Jr	Venetia, PA
8	OF	Quincy Mazeke	R/R	5 ft 10 in (1.78 m)	185 lb (84 kg)	Fr	Canton, OH
9	C	Enzo Infelise	R/R	6 ft 2 in (1.88 m)	225 lb (102 kg)	Fr	New Lenox, IL
10	LHP	Brennan Eager	L/L	6 ft 2 in (1.88 m)	210 lb (95 kg)	So	West Monroe, LA
11	RHP	Nathan Taylor	L/R	6 ft 5 in (1.96 m)	230 lb (104 kg)	Jr	Amelia, OH
13	OF	Luke Kosko	L/R	6 ft 4 in (1.93 m)	210 lb (95 kg)	Fr	Pittsburgh, PA
14	INF	Jackson Smith	L/R	6 ft 0 in (1.83 m)	180 lb (82 kg)	So	Channahon, IL
15	RHP	Tucker King	R/R	6 ft 3 in (1.91 m)	210 lb (95 kg)	Fr	Western Springs, IL
16	RHP	Adam Brouwer	R/R	6 ft 1 in (1.85 m)	200 lb (91 kg)	RS Sr	Tinley Park, IL
17	C	Ryan Tyranski	L/R	6 ft 4 in (1.93 m)	195 lb (88 kg)	RS Fr	Birmingham, MI
19	INF	Charlie Niehaus	R/R	5 ft 11 in (1.8 m)	185 lb (84 kg)	RS So	West Chester, OH
20	RHP	Dominic Mauro	R/R	6 ft 1 in (1.85 m)	210 lb (95 kg)	Jr	Lapeer, MI
21	OF	Cal Sefcik	R/R	6 ft 0 in (1.83 m)	220 lb (100 kg)	Jr	Palos Heights, IL
22	INF	Ben Voegele	L/R	6 ft 1 in (1.85 m)	190 lb (86 kg)	Fr	Hamilton, OH
23	RHP	Brendin Oliver	R/R	6 ft 3 in (1.91 m)	192 lb (87 kg)	So	Mooresville, IN
24	RHP	Logan Knight	R/R	6 ft 6 in (1.98 m)	220 lb (100 kg)	Sr	London, Ontario, Canada
25	INF	Quinton Coats	R/R	6 ft 3 in (1.91 m)	225 lb (102 kg)	So	Olathe, KS
26	RHP	Charlie Dieruf IV	R/R	6 ft 1 in (1.85 m)	200 lb (91 kg)	So	Hebron, KY
27	OF	Joe DuSell	L/L	6 ft 2 in (1.88 m)	210 lb (95 kg)	Fr	Elgin, IL
28	C	Gavin Brewer	R/R	5 ft 11 in (1.8 m)	190 lb (86 kg)	RS Fr	Knoxville, TN
29	RHP	Carson Marsh	R/R	5 ft 10 in (1.78 m)	178 lb (81 kg)	Jr	West Chester, OH
30	RHP	Connor Blue	R/R	6 ft 3 in (1.91 m)	210 lb (95 kg)	Fr	O'Fallon, IL
31	RHP	Adam Buczkowski	R/R	6 ft 2 in (1.88 m)	205 lb (93 kg)	So	Carmel, IN
32	RHP	Tommy Boba	R/R	6 ft 2 in (1.88 m)	210 lb (95 kg)	RS Jr	Wheaton, IL
33	RHP	Bradley Coulter	R/R	6 ft 1 in (1.85 m)	189 lb (86 kg)	RS So	Taylorsville, KY
35	RHP	Alex Gonzalez	R/R	6 ft 0 in (1.83 m)	165 lb (75 kg)	Fr	McLean, VA
38	RHP	Joel Piñeiro	R/R	6 ft 1 in (1.85 m)	202 lb (92 kg)	RS Sr	Miami, FL
39	RHP	Dillon Schueler	R/R	6 ft 2 in (1.88 m)	190 lb (86 kg)	Sr	Rock Falls, IL
40	LHP	Hudson Johnson	L/L	6 ft 1 in (1.85 m)	245 lb (111 kg)	So	Prior Lake, MN
42	OF	Derrick Pitts	R/R	6 ft 2 in (1.88 m)	198 lb (90 kg)	So	St. Louis, MO
44		Nolan Jaworowski	L/L	6 ft 5 in (1.96 m)	230 lb (104 kg)	Fr	St. Louis, MO
45	LHP	Brenden Garula	R/L	5 ft 11 in (1.8 m)	195 lb (88 kg)	RS Jr	Mason, OH
50	RHP	Chad Brown	R/R	6 ft 6 in (1.98 m)	230 lb (104 kg)	Fr	Hemlock, MI

Head coach

Jordan Bischel

Assistant coach(es)

Kyle Pettoruto
Tayler Sheriff
Tom Winske

Legend

- (C) Team captain
- (S) Suspended
- (I) Ineligible
- Injured
- Current redshirt

Roster
Last update: March 29, 2026

== Schedule and results ==
2026 Cincinnati Bearcats baseball game log (38–22)
Regular season (37–19)
February (8–4)
(Home: 3–1; Away: 5–3)

Date	Opponent	Rank	TV	Venue	Score	Win	Loss	Save	Attendance	Overall record	Big 12 record
February 13	at Jacksonville State	—	ESPN+	Jim Case Stadium; Jacksonville, AL	**W** 11–5	—	—	—	—	1–0	–
February 14	at Jacksonville State	—	—	Jim Case Stadium; Jacksonville, AL	**W** 6–5	—	—	—	—	2–0	–
February 15	at Jacksonville State	—	ESPN+	Jim Case Stadium; Jacksonville, AL	**L** 0–1	—	—	—	—	2–1	–
February 17	at No. 9 Auburn	—	SEC Network Plus	Plainsman Park; Auburn, AL	**W** 8–0	—	—	—	—	3–1	–
February 19	at UAB	—	ESPN+	Young Memorial Field; Birmingham, AL	**L** 11–12	—	—	—	—	3–2	–
February 20	at UAB	—	ESPN+	Young Memorial Field; Birmingham, AL	**L** 3–8	—	—	—	—	3–3	–
February 21	at UAB	—	ESPN+	Young Memorial Field; Birmingham, AL	**W** 8–4	—	—	—	—	4–3	–
February 22	at UAB	—	ESPN+	Young Memorial Field; Birmingham, AL	**W** 8–6	—	—	—	—	5–3	–
February 25	Bowling Green	—	ESPN+	UC Baseball Stadium; Cincinnati, OH	**W** 11–1 (7)	—	—	—	—	6–3	–
February 27	Austin Peay	—	ESPN+	UC Baseball Stadium; Cincinnati, OH	**W** 5–4 (10)	—	—	—	—	7–3	–
February 28	Austin Peay	—	ESPN+	UC Baseball Stadium; Cincinnati, OH	**L** 1–7	—	—	—	—	7–4	–
February 28	Austin Peay	—	ESPN+	UC Baseball Stadium; Cincinnati, OH	**W** 3–0	—	—	—	—	8–4	–

March (13–6)
(Home: 10–2; Away: 3–4)

Date	Opponent	Rank	TV	Venue	Score	Win	Loss	Save	Attendance	Overall record	Big 12 record
March 3	at Western Kentucky	—	—	Nick Denes Field; Bowling Green, KY	**W** 5–2	—	—	—	—	9–4	–
March 5	UC San Diego	—	ESPN+	UC Baseball Stadium; Cincinnati, OH	**W** 9–5	—	—	—	—	10–4	–
March 6	UC San Diego	—	ESPN+	UC Baseball Stadium; Cincinnati, OH	**W** 16–1 (7)	—	—	—	—	11–4	–
March 6	UC San Diego	—	ESPN+	UC Baseball Stadium; Cincinnati, OH	**W** 13–3 (7)	—	—	—	—	12–4	–
March 8	UC San Diego	—	ESPN+	UC Baseball Stadium; Cincinnati, OH	**W** 9–8 (11)	—	—	—	—	13–4	–
March 10	Evansville	—	ESPN+	UC Baseball Stadium; Cincinnati, OH	**W** 13–11	—	—	—	—	14–4	–
March 12	at BYU	—	ESPN+	Miller Park; Provo, UT	**L** 2–5	—	—	—	—	14–5	0–1
March 13	at BYU	—	ESPN+	Miller Park; Provo, UT	**W** 9–7	—	—	—	—	15–5	1–1
March 14	at BYU	—	ESPN+	Miller Park; Provo, UT	**L** 9–10	—	—	—	—	15–6	1–2
March 16	at Utah Valley	—	ESPN+	UCCU Ballpark; Orem, UT	**W** 11–1 (8)	—	—	—	—	16–6	–
March 17	at Utah Valley	—	ESPN+	UCCU Ballpark; Orem, UT	**W** 6–3	—	—	—	—	17–6	–
March 20	Utah	—	ESPN+	UC Baseball Stadium; Cincinnati, OH	**W** 13–4	—	—	—	—	18–6	2–2
March 21	Utah	—	ESPN+	UC Baseball Stadium; Cincinnati, OH	**W** 20–10 (8)	—	—	—	—	19–6	3–2
March 22	Utah	—	ESPN+	UC Baseball Stadium; Cincinnati, OH	**L** 11–13	—	—	—	—	19–7	3–3
March 24	at Xavier	—	—	J. Page Hayden Field; Cincinnati, OH	**L** 3–4	—	—	—	—	19–8	–
March 27	Kansas	—	ESPN+	UC Baseball Stadium; Cincinnati, OH	**W** 5–0	—	—	—	—	20–8	4–3
March 28	Kansas	—	ESPN+	UC Baseball Stadium; Cincinnati, OH	**L** 2–8	—	—	—	—	20–9	4–4
March 29	Kansas	—	ESPN+	UC Baseball Stadium; Cincinnati, OH	**L** 6–13	—	—	—	—	20–10	4–5
March 31	Wright State	—	ESPN+	UC Baseball Stadium; Cincinnati, OH	**W** 8–5	—	—	—	—	21–10	–

April (8–7)
(Home: 5–2; Away: 2–5; Neutral: 1–0)

Date	Opponent	Rank	TV	Venue	Score	Win	Loss	Save	Attendance	Overall record	Big 12 record
April 3	at Oklahoma State	—	ESPN+	O'Brate Stadium; Stillwater, OK	**L** 9–12	—	—	—	—	21–11	4–6
April 4	at Oklahoma State	—	—	O'Brate Stadium; Stillwater, OK	**L** 3–11	—	—	—	—	21–12	4–7
April 5	at Oklahoma State	—	—	O'Brate Stadium; Stillwater, OK	**L** 4–10	—	—	—	—	21–13	4–8
April 8	vs. Miami (OH)	—	—	Prasco Park; Mason, OH	**W** 8–7	—	—	—	—	22–13	–
April 10	vs. Baylor	—	ESPN+	UC Baseball Stadium; Cincinnati, OH	**W** 11–1 (8)	—	—	—	—	23–13	5–8
April 11	Baylor	—	ESPN+	UC Baseball Stadium; Cincinnati, OH	**W** 8–0	—	—	—	—	24–13	6–8
April 12	Baylor	—	ESPN+	UC Baseball Stadium; Cincinnati, OH	**L** 3–8	—	—	—	—	24–14	6–9
April 14	vs. Xavier	—	ESPN+	UC Baseball Stadium; Cincinnati, OH	**W** 15–5 (7)	—	—	—	2,042	25–14	–
April 17	at No. 21 UCF	—	—	John Euliano Park; Orlando, FL	**L** 1–7	—	—	—	—	25–15	6–10
April 18	at No. 21 UCF	—	—	John Euliano Park; Orlando, FL	**W** 9–3	—	—	—	—	26–15	7–10
April 19	at No. 21 UCF	—	—	John Euliano Park; Orlando, FL	**W** 11–9	—	—	—	—	27–15	8–10
April 21	at Wright State	—	—	Nischwitz Stadium; Dayton, OH	**L** 7–12	—	—	—	—	27–16	–
April 24 (Note: Game was suspended due to rain and completed on April 25.)	No. 12 West Virginia	—	ESPN+	UC Baseball Stadium; Cincinnati, OH	**L** 5–9 (13)	—	—	—	—	27–17	8–11
April 25	No. 12 West Virginia	—	ESPN+	UC Baseball Stadium; Cincinnati, OH	**W** 5–2	—	—	—	—	28–17	9–11
April 26	No. 12 West Virginia	—	ESPN+	UC Baseball Stadium; Cincinnati, OH	**W** 7–5	—	—	—	—	29–17	10–11

May (8–2)
(Home: 2–1; Away: 6–1)

Date	Opponent	Rank	TV	Venue	Score	Win	Loss	Save	Attendance	Overall record	Big 12 record
May 2	at Houston	—	ESPN+	Darryl & Lori Schroeder Park; Houston, TX	**W** 3–2	—	—	—	—	30–17	11–11
May 2	at Houston	—	—	Darryl & Lori Schroeder Park; Houston, TX	**W** 8–1	—	—	—	—	31–17	12–11
May 3	at Houston	—	—	Darryl & Lori Schroeder Park; Houston, TX	**W** 4–3 (11)	—	—	—	—	32–17	13–11
May 5	at Oral Roberts	—	—	J. L. Johnson Stadium; Tulsa, OK	**W** 15–4	—	—	—	—	33–17	–
May 8	at Kansas State	—	—	Tointon Family Stadium; Manhattan, KS	**W** 4–2	—	—	—	—	34–17	14–11
May 9	at Kansas State	—	—	Tointon Family Stadium; Manhattan, KS	**W** 5–3	—	—	—	—	35–17	15–11
May 10	at Kansas State	—	—	Tointon Family Stadium; Manhattan, KS	**L** 2–5	—	—	—	—	35–18	15–12
May 14	Texas Tech	No. 25	ESPN+	UC Baseball Stadium; Cincinnati, OH	**W** 13–1 (7)	—	—	—	—	36–18	16–12
May 15	Texas Tech	No. 25	ESPN+	UC Baseball Stadium; Cincinnati, OH	**L** 5–6	—	—	—	—	36–19	16–13
May 15	Texas Tech	No. 25	ESPN+	UC Baseball Stadium; Cincinnati, OH	**W** 8–7	—	—	—	—	37–19	17–13

Postseason (1–2)
Big 12 Tournament (0–1)

Date	Opponent	Seed	TV	Venue	Score	Win	Loss	Save	Attendance	Overall record	Big12T record

"#" represents ranking. All rankings from D1 Baseball Poll on the date of the contest.
"()" represents postseason seeding in the Big 12 Tournament or NCAA Regional, respectively.
= Win, = Loss, = Canceled/Postponed
Bold = **Cincinnati team member**
* = Non-Conference Game
Schedule Source:

Schedule Notes:

== Rankings ==
Ranking movements Legend: ██ Increase in ranking ██ Decrease in ranking — = Not ranked RV = Received votes
	Week																	
Poll	Pre	1	2	3	4	5	6	7	8	9	10	11	12	13	14	15	16	Final
Coaches'	—	—*	—	—	RV	RV	RV	—	—	—	—	RV	RV	RV	23	24	24*	
Baseball America	—	—	—	—	—	—	25	—	—	—	—	23	20	18	17	17*	17*	
NCBWA†	RV	RV	RV	RV	RV	RV	RV	RV	RV	RV	RV	RV	RV	RV	RV	RV*	RV	
D1Baseball	—	—	—	—	—	—	—	—	—	—	—	—	—	25	22	24	24*	
Perfect Game	—	—	—	—	—	—	—	—	—	—	—	—	22	20	20	20*	20*	

† NCBWA ranks 30 teams in their preseason poll, but only ranks 25 teams weekly during the season.
* A new poll was not released for this week, so for comparison purposes, the previous week's ranking is inserted in this week's slot.
