= 2026 West Virginia Mountaineers baseball team =

American college baseball season

2026 West Virginia Mountaineers baseball

NCAA Morgantown Regional champions NCAA Morgantown Super Regional champions

College World Series, 2–2
- Conference: Big 12 Conference

Ranking
- Coaches: No. 4
- D1Baseball.com: No. 4
- Record: 47–17 (21–9 Big 12)
- Head coach: Steve Sabins (2nd season)
- Assistant coaches: Jacob Garcia; Jimmy Roesinger; Justin Oney
- Home stadium: Kendrick Family Ballpark

2026 Big 12 Conference baseball standings
	Conf.				Overall
Team	W		L	PCT	W		L	PCT
No. 12 Kansas ‍†‍‡‍^{y}	22	–	8	.733	45	–	16	.738
No. 4 West Virginia ‍‍‍^{y}	21	–	9	.700	47	–	17	.734
Arizona State ‍‍‍^{y}	19	–	11	.633	39	–	21	.650
UCF ‍‍‍^{y}	19	–	11	.633	32	–	23	.582
No. 25 Oklahoma State ‍‍‍^{y}	18	–	12	.600	39	–	22	.639
Cincinnati ‍‍‍^{y}	17	–	13	.567	38	–	22	.633
TCU ‍‍‍	17	–	13	.567	33	–	21	.611
Baylor ‍‍‍	14	–	16	.467	30	–	27	.526
BYU ‍‍‍	14	–	16	.467	28	–	29	.491
Utah ‍‍‍	12	–	18	.400	26	–	25	.510
Kansas State ‍‍‍	11	–	19	.367	30	–	27	.526
Texas Tech ‍‍‍	10	–	20	.333	27	–	28	.491
Arizona ‍‍‍	9	–	21	.300	19	–	34	.358
Houston ‍‍‍	7	–	23	.233	24	–	31	.436
† – Conference champion ‡ – Tournament champion y – Invited to the NCAA tournament As of May 20, 2026; Rankings from D1baseball

The 2026 West Virginia Mountaineers baseball team represented West Virginia University during the 2026 NCAA Division I baseball season. The Mountaineers played their home games at Kendrick Family Ballpark as a member of the Big 12 Conference. They were led by second year head coach, Steve Sabins.

== Previous season ==
West Virginia finished the 2025 season 44–16, 19–9 in Big 12 Conference play, were the Big 12 regular season champions. West Virginia swept the Clemson Regional with two wins over Kentucky and one over the No. 11 ranked Clemson. With the regional title, the Mountaineers advanced to the Baton Rouge Super Regional—where they were eliminated by the No. 6 national seed, LSU, in two games.

== Preseason ==
=== Big 12 Coaches poll ===
The coaches poll was released on February 5, 2026. West Virginia was picked to third in the Big 12.

Big 12 coaches poll
Predicted finish	Team	Votes (1st place)
1	TCU	169 (13)
2	Arizona	157 (1)
3	West Virginia	137
4	Arizona State	128
t-5	Kansas	112
t-5	Oklahoma State	112
7	Kansas State	87
8	Cincinnati	85
9	Texas Tech	78
10	UCF	66
11	Baylor	54
12	Houston	42
13	BYU	29
14	Utah	18

== Rankings ==
Ranking movements Legend: ██ Increase in ranking ██ Decrease in ranking — = Not ranked RV = Received votes
	Week																	
Poll	Pre	1	2	3	4	5	6	7	8	9	10	11	12	13	14	15	16	Final
Coaches'	RV	RV*	RV	RV	RV	22	16	12	19	15	14	20	15	11	11	11	11*	4
Baseball America	21	20	20	21	22	18	15	13	18	18	14	20	18	13	12	12*	12*	4
NCBWA†	27	23	21	21	23	21	15	11	15	11	10	16	14	9	9	9*	5	4
D1Baseball	—	25	24	23	—	20	17	13	17	15	12	18	15	9	9	9	9*	4
Perfect Game	—	—	—	24	25	20	18	11	16	13	11	17	15	7	6	6*	6*	4

† NCBWA ranks 30 teams in their preseason poll, but only ranks 25 teams weekly during the season.
* A new poll was not released for this week, so for comparison purposes, the previous week's ranking is inserted in this week's slot.

== Personnel ==
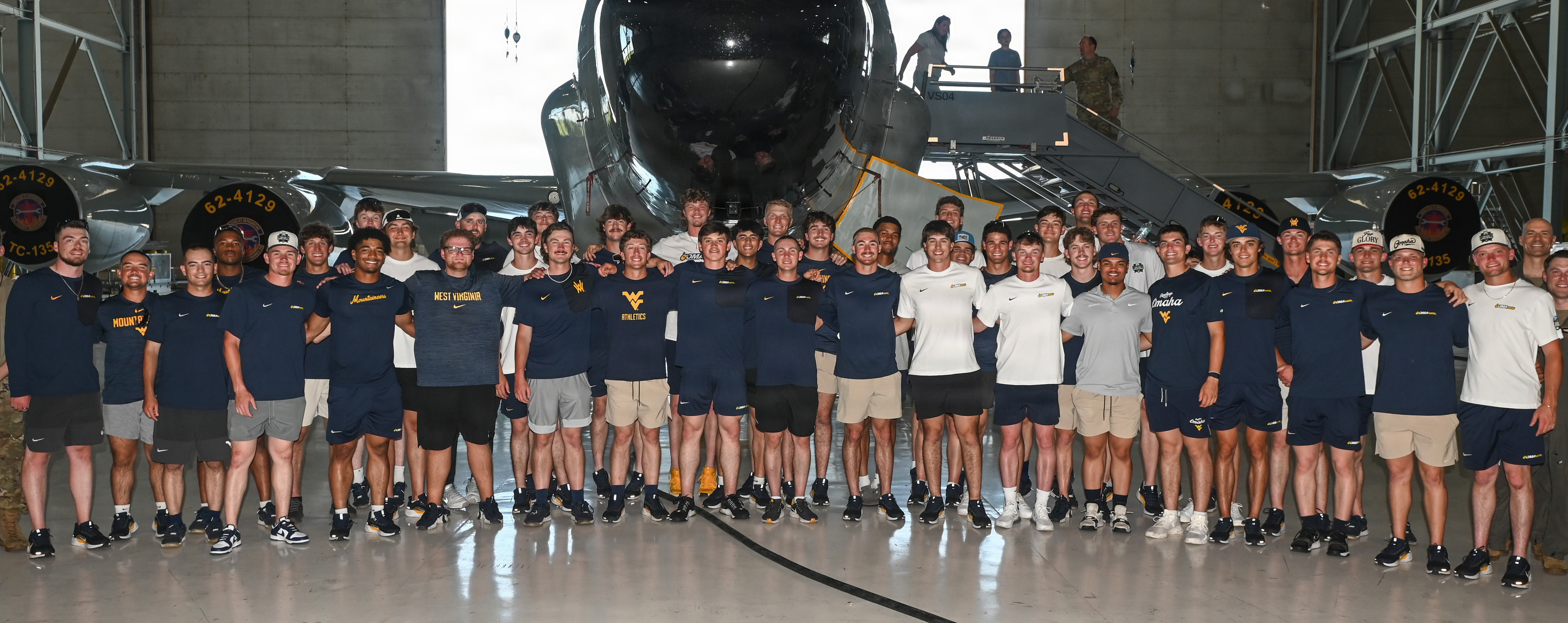
The Mountaineers baseball team at Offutt Air Force Base during the 2026 College World Series

=== Coaching staff ===
2026 West Virginia Mountaineers coaching staff
- Steve Sabins - Head coach - 2nd year
- Jacob Garcia - Associate Coach/Recruiting Coordinator - 7th year
- Jimmy Roesinger - Assistant Coach - 3rd year
- Justin Oney - Assistant Coach - 2nd year

=== Support staff ===
2026 West Virginia Mountaineers support staff
- Joey Cuomo - Director of Operations - 2nd year
- Jedd Gyorko - Special Assistant to Head Coach - 2nd year
- Drew Hefner - Director of Player Development

== Schedule and results ==
2026 West Virginia Mountaineers baseball game log (47–17)
Legend: = Win = Loss = Canceled Bold = West Virginia team member
Regular season (37–13)

February (8–1)
Date	Time (ET)	TV	Opponent	Rank	Stadium	Score	Win	Loss	Save	Attend	Overall Record	Big 12 Record	Sources
Feb. 13	6:30 pm	ESPN+	at Georgia Southern*	—	J.I. Clements Stadium; Statesboro, GA	**W** 15-3	**Bassinger** **(1-0)**	Kalkbrenner (0-1)	—	3,023	1-0	—	
Feb. 14 (DH 1)	2:00 pm	ESPN+	at Georgia Southern*	—	J.I. Clements Stadium	**W** 11-10	**Meyer** **(1-0)**	Garrett (0-1)	**Estridge** **(1)**	2,836	2-0	—	
Feb. 14 (DH 2)	5:00 pm	ESPN+	at Georgia Southern*	—	J.I. Clements Stadium	**W** 5-2	**Montesa** **(1-0)**	Holder (0-1)	**Perez** **(1)**	2674	3-0	—	
Feb. 20	4:00 pm	ESPN+	at Liberty*	—	Liberty Baseball Stadium; Lynchburg, VA	**W** 12-0	**Cole** **(1-0)**	Blair (0-1)	—	1,370	4-0	—	
Feb. 21 (DH 1)	1:00 pm	ESPN+	at Liberty*	—	Liberty Baseball Stadium	**W** 2-0	**Yehl** **(1-0)**	Lucas (0-1)	**Perez** **(2)**	2,390	5-0	—	
Feb. 21 (DH 2)	5:00 pm	ESPN+	at Liberty*	—	Liberty Baseball Stadium	**L** 1-4	Zayac (2-0)	**Montesa** **(1-1)**	Potts (1)	2,390	5-1	—	
Feb. 25	1:30 pm	ESPN+	Ohio*	#24	Wagener Field at Kendrick Family Ballpark; Morgantown, WV	**W** 19-6	**Hagen** **(1-0)**	Cook (0-1)	—	2,055	6-1	—	
Feb. 27	4:00 pm	ESPN+	at Kennesaw State*	#24	Mickey Dunn Stadium; Kennesaw, GA	**W** 12-4	**Montesa** **(2-1)**	McMullen (0-1)	—	752	7-1	—	
Feb. 28	2:00 pm	ESPN+	at Kennesaw State*	#24	Mickey Dunn Stadium	**W** 9-1	**Cole** **(2-0)**	Bayer (0-2)	—	1,005	8-1	—	

March (12–4)
Date	Time (ET)	TV	Opponent	Rank	Stadium	Score	Win	Loss	Save	Attend	Overall Record	Big 12 Record	Sources
Mar. 1	12:00 pm	ESPN+	at Kennesaw State*	#24	Mickey Dunn Stadium	**L** 6-7	Cain (2-0)	**Perez** **(0-1)**	—	802	8-2	—	
Mar. 3	—	ESPN+	at Marshall*	#23	Jack Cook Field; Huntington, WV	**Canceled**			—		—	—	
Mar. 6	2:00 pm	ESPN+	Columbia*	#23	Wagener Field at Kendrick Family Ballpark	**L** 4-7	Sotiropoulos (1-0)	**Montesa** **(2-2)**	Soske (1)	2,233	8-3	—	
Mar. 7	12:00 pm	ESPN+	Columbia*	#23	Wagener Field at Kendrick Family Ballpark	**W** 9-5 (10 inn.)	**Perez** **(1-1)**	Kleinhans (1-1)	—	2,885	9-3	—	
Mar. 8	12:30 pm	ESPN+	Columbia*	#23	Wagener Field at Kendrick Family Ballpark	**W** 16-1	**Yehl** **(2-0)**	Korthas (0-1)	—	2,508	10-3	—	
Mar. 10	2:00 pm	ESPN+	Maryland*	—	Wagener Field at Kendrick Family Ballpark	**W** 10-3	**Estridge** **(1-0)**	Morlang (2-3)	—	2,480	11-3	—	
Mar. 13	7:30 pm	ESPN+	at Baylor	—	Baylor Ballpark; Waco, TX	**L** 6-7	Wallace (2-0)	**Bassinger** **(1-1)**	Bunch (2)	2,318	11-4	0-1	
Mar. 14	3:00 pm	ESPN+	at Baylor	—	Baylor Ballpark	**W** 13-2	**Cole** **(3-0)**	Murry (0-1)	—	2,461	12-4	1-1	
Mar. 15	12:00 pm	ESPN+	at Baylor	—	Baylor Ballpark	**W** 9-0	**Yehl** **(3-0)**	Calder (1-2)	—	1,962	13-4	2-1	
Mar. 17	—	ESPN+	Penn State*	#20	Wagener Field at Kendrick Family Ballpark		**Canceled**		—		—	—	
Mar. 19	4:30 pm	ESPN+	BYU	#20	Wagener Field at Kendrick Family Ballpark	**W** 7-4	**Montesa** **(3-2)**	Sumner (1-1)	**Perez** **(3)**	2,178	14-4	3-1	
Mar. 20	2:00 pm	ESPN+	BYU	#20	Wagener Field at Kendrick Family Ballpark	**W** 12-10	**Korn** **(1-0)**	Johnson (1-2)	**Perez** **(4)**	2,133	15-4	4-1	
Mar. 21	12:30 pm	ESPN+	BYU	#20	Wagener Field at Kendrick Family Ballpark	**W** 11-1	**Yehl** **(4-0)**	Gray (2-5)	—	2,706	16-4	5-1	
Mar. 24	6:00 pm	ESPN+	at Marshall*	#17	Jack Cook Field	**W** 3-0	**Hagen** **(2-0)**	Blaine (1-3)	**Perez** **(5)**	2,285	17-4	5-1	
Mar. 27	9:30 pm	ESPN+	at #22 Arizona State	#17	Phoenix Municipal Stadium; Phoenix, AZ	**L** 4-14	Penn (4-0)	**Montesa** **(3-3)**	—	3,788	17-5	5-2	
Mar. 28	9:30 pm	ESPN+	at #22 Arizona State	#17	Phoenix Municipal Stadium	**W** 13-7	**Yehl** **(5-0)**	Overbay (0-1)	—	3,299	18-5	6-2	
Mar. 29	8:00 pm	ESPN2	at #22 Arizona State	#17	Phoenix Municipal Stadium	**W** 9-5	**Cole** **(4-0)**	Klecker (3-2)	**Perez** **(6)**	3,377	19-5	7-2	
Mar. 31	9:00 pm	ESPN+	at Arizona*	#13	Hi Corbett Field; Tucson, AZ	**W** 7-4	**Estridge** **(2-0)**	Brandt (0-2)	**Bassinger** **(1)**	2,084	20-5	7-2	

April (8–7)
Date	Time (ET)	TV	Opponent	Rank	Stadium	Score	Win	Loss	Save	Attend	Overall Record	Big 12 Record	Sources
Apr. 3	6:30 pm	ESPN+	#23 UCF	#13	Wagener Field at Kendrick Family Ballpark	**L** 0-5	Murray (3-1)	**Montesa** **(3-4)**	—	3,850	20-6	7-3	
Apr. 4	2:00 pm	ESPN+	#23 UCF	#13	Wagener Field at Kendrick Family Ballpark	**W** 11-10	**Estridge** **(3-0)**	Jones (1-2)	—	3,413	21-6	8-3	
Apr. 5	12:00 pm	ESPN+	#23 UCF	#13	Wagener Field at Kendrick Family Ballpark	**L** 5-1	Wicker (3-1)	**Cole** **(4-1)**	—	2,386	21-7	8-4	
Apr. 8	6:30 pm	ESPN+	Marshall*	#17	Wagener Field at Kendrick Family Ballpark	**W** 12-2	**Korn** **(2-0)**	Collins (2-3)	—	3,312	22-7	8-4	
Apr. 10	7:30 pm	ESPN+	at Texas Tech	#17	Dan Law Field at Rip Griffin Park; Lubbock, TX	**W** 12-8	**Perez** **(2-1)**	Han (0-2)	—	3,754	23-7	9-4	
Apr. 11	1:00 pm	ESPN+	at Texas Tech	#17	Dan Law Field at Rip Griffin Park	**L** 1-4	Bevis (1-1)	**Yehl** **(5-1)**	—	3,442	23-8	9-5	
Apr. 12	2:00 pm	ESPN+	at Texas Tech	#17	Dan Law Field at Rip Griffin Park	**W** 10-2	**Cole** **(4-0)**	Hayes (3-3)	—	3,428	24-8	10-5	
Apr. 15	5:30 pm	—	vs. Penn State*	#15	Meritus Park; Hagerstown, MD	**W** 3-1	**Hagen** **(3-0)**	Butash (0-1)	**Bassinger** **(2)**	4,748	25-8	10-5	
Apr. 17	6:30 pm	ESPN+	Houston	#15	Wagener Field at Kendrick Family Ballpark	**L** 7-10	Hoffman (2-4)	**Montesa** **(3-5)**	—	3,851	25-9	10-6	
Apr. 18	11:00 am	ESPN+	Houston	#15	Wagener Field at Kendrick Family Ballpark	**W** 7-1	**Korn** **(3-0)**	Schmitz (2-5)	—	3,237	26-9	11-6	
Apr. 19	1:00 pm	ESPN+	Houston	#15	Wagener Field at Kendrick Family Ballpark	**W** 7–3	**Cole** **(6–1)**	Udland (2–3)	—	2,657	27–9	12–6	
Apr. 21	6:30 pm	ESPN+	Pittsburgh*	#12	Wagener Field at Kendrick Family Ballpark	**L** 1–23	Kriebel (1-1)	**Thacker** **(0-1)**	—	4,571	27-10	12–6	
Apr. 24	5:00 pm	ESPN+	at Cincinnati	#12	UC Baseball Stadium; Cincinnati, OH	**W** 9–5 (13 inn.)	**Cole** (6–1)	Schueler (0–1)	—	1,457	28-10	13–6	
Apr. 25	3:00 pm	ESPN+	at Cincinnati	#12	UC Baseball Stadium	**L** 2–5	Brown (3-0)	**Hagen** **(3–1)**	Buczkowski (3)	1,649	28–11	13-7	
Apr. 26	1:00 pm	ESPN+	at Cincinnati	#12	UC Baseball Stadium	**L** 5–7	Garula (1-0)	**Bassinger** **(1–2)**	—	1,503	28-12	13-8	
Apr. 29	—	—	at Penn State*	#18	Medlar Field at Lubrano Park; University Park, PA	**Canceled**			—		—	—	

May (9–1)
Date	Time (ET)	TV	Opponent	Rank	Stadium	Score	Win	Loss	Save	Attend	Overall Record	Big 12 Record	Sources
May 1	6:30 pm	ESPN+	Kansas State	#18	Wagener Field at Kendrick Family Ballpark	**W** 7–0	**Yehl** **(6–1)**	Butler (0–3)	**Korn** **(1)**	2,884	29–12	14–8	
May 2	4:00 pm	ESPN+	Kansas State	#18	Wagener Field at Kendrick Family Ballpark	**W** 9–1	**Cole** **(8–1)**	Sheffield (6–2)	—	3,067	30–12	15–8	
May 3	1:00 pm	ESPN+	Kansas State	#18	Wagener Field at Kendrick Family Ballpark	**W** 13–6	**Estridge** **(4–0)**	Guyette (5–2)	—	2,757	31-12	16–8	
May 5	6:00 pm	ESPN+	vs. Marshall*	#15	GoMart Ballpark; Charleston, WV	**W** 7–2	**Hagen** **(4–1)**	Doll (2–4)	—	9,302	32-12	16-8	
May 8	7:00 pm	ESPN+	at #7 Kansas	#15	Hoglund Ballpark; Lawrence, KS	**W** 4–1	**Yehl** **(7–1)**	Voegele (5–3)	—	2,192	33-12	17-8	
May 9	3:00 pm	ESPN+	at #7 Kansas	#15	Hoglund Ballpark	**W** 5–2	**Korn** **(4–0)**	Ritter (5–2)	—	2,301	34-12	18-8	
May 10	12:00 pm	ESPN+	at #7 Kansas	#15	Hoglund Ballpark	**W** 13–2	**Bassinger** **(2–2)**	Nayral (4–3)	—	2,087	35-12	19–8	
May 14	6:30 pm	ESPN+	TCU	#9	Wagener Field at Kendrick Family Ballpark	**W** 2–0	**Korn** **(5–0)**	Lapour (1–2)	**Estridge** **(7)**	2,645	36-12	20-8	
May 15	6:30 pm	ESPN+	TCU	#9	Wagener Field at Kendrick Family Ballpark	**L** 0–4	Davis (5–3)	**Yehl** **(7–2)**	—	3,759	36-13	20-9	
May 16	12:00 pm	ESPN+	TCU	#9	Wagener Field at Kendrick Family Ballpark	**W** 6–4	**Bassinger** **(3–2)**	Sagouspe (3–3)	—	3,846	37-13	21-9	

Postseason (10-4)

Big 12 Tournament (2–1)
Date	Time (ET)	TV	Opponent	Seed	Stadium	Score	Win	Loss	Save	Attend	Overall Record	Tourney Record	Sources
May 21	7:30 pm	ESPNU	vs. (11) Kansas State	(2) #9	Surprise Stadium; Surprise, AZ	**W** 4–2	**Yehl** **(8–2)**	Sheffield (8–4)	**Korn** **(2)**	2,119	38–13	1–0	
May 22	11:00 pm	ESPN+	vs. (3) #21 Arizona State	(2) #9	Surprise Stadium	**W** 7–3	**Bassinger** **(4–2)**	Edwards (1–3)	**Montesa** **(1)**	2,153	39–13	2–0	
May 22	7:30 pm	ESPN2	vs. (1) #13 Kansas	(2) #9	Surprise Stadium	**L** 0–9	Scheidt (5–1)	**Korn** **(5–1)**	—	3,293	39–14	2–1	

NCAA Tournament: Morgantown Regional (4–1)
Date	Time (ET)	TV	Opponent	Seed	Stadium	Score	Win	Loss	Save	Attend	Overall Record	Tourney Record	Sources
May 29	5:00 pm	ESPN+	vs. (4) Binghamton	(1) #16	Wagener Field at Kendrick Family Ballpark	**W** 10–1	**Cole** **(9–1)**	Griffin (3–4)	**Hagen** **(1)**	4,120	40–14	1–0	
May 30	5:00 pm	SEC Network	vs. (3) Kentucky	(1) #16	Wagener Field at Kendrick Family Ballpark	**L** 9–11	Bennett (2–3)	**Bassinger** **(4–3)**	—	4,276	40–15	1–1	
May 31	12:00 pm	ESPN2	vs. (2) Wake Forest	(1) #16	Wagener Field at Kendrick Family Ballpark	**W** 10–5	**Montesa** **(4-5)**	Dressler (8-2)	—	4,181	41–15	2–1	
May 31	5:00 pm	SEC Network	vs. (3) Kentucky	(1) #16	Wagener Field at Kendrick Family Ballpark	**W** 11–9	**McDougal** **(1-0)**	Soucie (0-2)	—	4,184	42–15	3–1	
June 1	6:00 pm	ESPN2	vs. (3) Kentucky	(1) #16	Wagener Field at Kendrick Family Ballpark	**W** 6–5 (10 inn.)	**Montesa** **(5-5)**	Bennett (2-4)	—	4,607	43–15	4–1	

NCAA Tournament: Morgantown Super Regional (2-0)
Date	Time (ET)	TV	Opponent	Seed	Stadium	Score	Win	Loss	Save	Attend	Overall Record	Tourney Record	Sources
June 5	12:00 pm	ESPN2	vs. (4) Cal Poly	(1) #16	Wagener Field at Kendrick Family Ballpark	**W** 12–2	**Cole** **(10–1)**	Naess (8–5)	—	4,564	44–15	5–1	
June 6	12:00 pm	ESPN2	vs. (4) Cal Poly	(1) #16	Wagener Field at Kendrick Family Ballpark	**W** 17–1	**Yehl** **(9–2)**	Turnquist (9–3)	—	4,675	45–15	6-1	

Men's College World Series (2–2)
Date	Time (ET)	TV	Opponent	Seed	Stadium	Score	Win	Loss	Save	Attend	Overall Record	Tourney Record	Sources
June 12	2:00 pm	ESPN	vs. (3) Troy	(1) #16	Charles Schwab Field; Omaha, NE	**W** 7–5	**Korn** **(6–1)**	Crotchfelt (7–3)	**McDougal** **(1)**	24,154	46–15	7–1	
June 14	7:00 pm	ESPN	vs. (1) #5 North Carolina	(1) #16	Charles Schwab Field	**L** 2–5	McDuffie (9–3)	**Yehl** **(9–3)**	Glauber (5)	24,414	46–16	7–2	
June 16	2:00 pm	ESPN	vs. (3) Troy	(1) #16	Charles Schwab Field	**W** 12–0	**Montesa** **(6-5)**	Ellingworth (2-5)	—	21,814	47–16	8–2	
June 17	2:00 pm	ESPN	vs. (1) #5 North Carolina	(1) #16	Charles Schwab Field	**L** 7–12	Rose; 5-0	**Chansen** **(10-2)**	—	23,572	47-17	8-3	

* indicates a non-conference game.
(#) All rankings from D1 Baseball Poll on the date of the contest.
