= George Glinatsis =

American baseball player (born 1969)

- Pitcher
- Born: June 29, 1969 (age 57); Youngstown, Ohio, U.S.
- Batted: Right Threw: Right

MLB debut
- July 18, 1994, for the Seattle Mariners

Last MLB appearance
- July 24, 1994, for the Seattle Mariners

MLB statistics
- Win–loss record: 0–1
- Earned run average: 13.50
- Strikeouts: 1
- Stats at Baseball Reference

Teams
- Seattle Mariners (1994)

George Glinatsis (born June 29, 1969) is an American former Major League Baseball (MLB) player who pitched briefly for the Seattle Mariners in 1994. He started two games for the Mariners and finished the season 0–1.

Glinatsis attended Boardman High School in Boardman, Ohio, where he played baseball and basketball. He played college baseball for the University of Cincinnati. He was selected by the Mariners in the 32nd round of the 1991 MLB draft.

Glinatsis was assigned to the Rookie-level Arizona League to begin his professional career. He led all pitchers in the league in wins and strikeouts and had the lowest earned run average of any player with more than 50 innings pitched. In the summer of the 1994 season, the Mariners found themselves short on pitching due to injuries. On July 18, the Mariners called Glinatsis up directly from Double-A and he made his major league debut that night as the starting pitcher against the Baltimore Orioles in Seattle. He allowed five runs in 4 2/3 innings. He made one more start six days later and allowed three runs to the Boston Red Sox in 2/3 of an inning. It was his final game in the majors. On July 27, he was replaced on the roster by Rich Amaral and returned to Double-A. That September, he had surgery to remove bone chips from his throwing elbow.

Following the 1995 season, Glinatsis was selected by the San Francisco Giants in the Rule 5 draft. He pitched in independent baseball for the St. Paul Saints in 1997. Prior to the 1998 season, he signed with the Colorado Rockies. While pitching in the Rockies' farm system in 1998, he tied a Pacific Coast League record by hitting three batters in one inning. Prior to the 1999 season, he signed with the Arizona Diamondbacks. Ultimately, however, he would not play for the Diamondbacks organization. He finished his professional baseball career that year with the Sinon Bulls in the Chinese Professional Baseball League.
