= Jordan Bischel =

American college baseball coach

Current position
- Title: Head coach
- Team: Cincinnati
- Conference: Big 12
- Record: 103–73

Biographical details
- Born: June 2, 1981 (age 45); Green Bay, Wisconsin, U.S.

Playing career
- 2000–2003: St. Norbert College
- Position: Pitcher / First baseman

Coaching career (HC unless noted)
- 2004–2006: St. Norbert College (asst.)
- 2007–2009: John Carroll (asst.)
- 2010–2012: Northwest Missouri State (asst.)
- 2013–2014: Midland
- 2015–2018: Northwood
- 2019–2023: Central Michigan
- 2024–present: Cincinnati

Head coaching record
- Overall: 417–229 (NCAA); 74–45 (NAIA)
- Tournaments: NAIA: 1–4; NCAA DII: 3–4; NCAA DI: 6–8

Accomplishments and honors

Championships
- GPAC Tournament (2014); 2× GLIAC Regular season (2017, 2018); 2× GLIAC Tournament (2017, 2018); 2× MAC Regular season (2019, 2021); 2× MAC Tournament (2019, 2022)

Awards
- 2× GLIAC Coach of the Year (2017, 2018); 2× MAC Coach of the Year (2019, 2021)

Jordan Bischel (born June 2, 1981) is an American baseball coach, former pitcher and first baseman, and current head baseball coach of the Cincinnati Bearcats. He played college baseball at St. Norbert College from 2000 to 2003. He previously served as the head coach of the Midland Warriors (2013–2014), the Northwood Timberwolves (2015–2018), and the Central Michigan Chippewas (2018–2023).

== Playing career ==
Bischel enrolled at the St. Norbert College, to play college baseball for the Green Knights team. Bischel played 4 years for the Green Knights, earning Second Team All-Midwest Conference North Division as a senior in 2003.

== Coaching career ==
Bischel began his coaching career in 2004 with St. Norbert. Bischel then went on to coach at John Carroll University. He was then named the pitching coach at Northwest Missouri State University. On September 28, 2012, Bischel was named the head coach at Midland University. After helping guide the Warriors to 74 wins in two season, Bischel accepted the role of head coach at Northwood University in Midland, Michigan to be closer to home. Bischel inherited a team that had gone 18–27 in 2014, and led them to a 28–23 record in 2015. In 2017, he led Northwood to their first Great Lakes Intercollegiate Athletic Conference championship, setting a GLIAC record for wins with 46. Bischel was named the GLIAC Coach of the Year at the conclusion of the season. Northwood repeated as GLIAC champions in 2018, as well as Bischel repeating as GLIAC Coach of the Year.

On June 28, 2018, Bischel was hired as the head coach of the Central Michigan Chippewas baseball program. In his first season at the helm, Bischel electrified the storied program, leading it to its first Mid-American Conference Tournament championship and its first NCAA tournament berth since 1995. He led the team to three consecutive (discounting the canceled 2020 season) NCAA Regionals.

On June 18, 2023, Bischel was named the head coach of the Cincinnati Bearcats baseball program.

== Head coaching record ==
Record table
Season	Team	Overall	Conference	Standing	Postseason
Midland Warriors (Great Plains Athletic Conference) (2013–2014)
2013	Midland	31–26	9–11	6th	NAIA Opening Round
2014	Midland	43–19	16–4	3rd	NAIA Opening Round
Midland:		74–45 (NAIA)	25–15		
Northwood Timberwolves (Great Lakes Intercollegiate Athletic Conference) (2015–2018)
2015	Northwood	28–23	20–12	3rd (North)	GLIAC Tournament
2016	Northwood	25–24	14–16	3rd (North)	
2017	Northwood	46–13	26–6	1st	NCAA Regional
2018	Northwood	38–16	21–7	1st	NCAA Regional
Northwood:		137–76	81–41		
Central Michigan Chippewas (Mid-American Conference) (2019–2023)
2019	Central Michigan	47–14	22–5	1st	NCAA Regional
2020	Central Michigan	11–6	0–0		Season canceled due to COVID-19
2021	Central Michigan	42–18	30–9	1st	NCAA Regional
2022	Central Michigan	43–19	30–7	2nd	NCAA Regional
2023	Central Michigan	34–23	19–11	T-2nd	
Central Michigan:		177–80	101–32		
Cincinnati Bearcats (Big 12 Conference) (2024–present)
2024	Cincinnati	32–25	17–13	5th	Big 12 tournament
2025	Cincinnati	33–26	16–14	8th	NCAA Regional
2026	Cincinnati	38–22	17–13	T–6th	NCAA Regional
Cincinnati:		103–73	50–40		
Total:		417–229			
National champion Postseason invitational champion Conference regular season champion Conference regular season and conference tournament champion Division regular season champion Division regular season and conference tournament champion Conference tournament champion

== See also ==
- List of current NCAA Division I baseball coaches
