= 2016 American Athletic Conference baseball tournament =

American college baseball tournament

- Tournament Logo
- Teams: 8
- Format: Double-elimination tournament
- Finals site: Bright House Field; Clearwater, FL
- Champions: Connecticut (1st title)
- Winning coach: Jim Penders (1st title)
- MVP: Anthony Kay (Connecticut)
- Television: CBS Sports Network, ESPNews

2016 American Athletic Conference baseball standings
	Conf.						Overall
Team	W		L		T	PCT	W		L		T	PCT
No. 25 Tulane ‍†‍‍^{y}	15	–	7	–	0	.682	39	–	19	–	0	.672
No. 15 East Carolina ‍‍‍^{y}	15	–	8	–	1	.646	34	–	21	–	1	.616
Connecticut ‍‍‡‍^{y}	14	–	9	–	0	.609	37	–	23	–	0	.617
Cincinnati ‍‍‍	13	–	10	–	1	.563	26	–	30	–	1	.465
Houston ‍‍‍	11	–	12	–	0	.478	36	–	23	–	0	.610
Memphis ‍‍‍	9	–	15	–	0	.375	22	–	39	–	0	.361
South Florida ‍‍‍	8	–	16	–	0	.333	24	–	33	–	0	.421
UCF ‍‍‍	8	–	16	–	0	.333	26	–	33	–	0	.441
† – Conference champion ‡ – Tournament champion y – Invited to the NCAA tournament As of June 2, 2016; Rankings from Collegiate Baseball

The 2016 American Athletic Conference baseball tournament was held at Bright House Field in Clearwater, Florida, from May 24 through 29. The event, held at the end of the conference regular season, determined the champion of the American Athletic Conference for the 2016 season. The University of Connecticut won and received the conference's automatic bid to the 2016 NCAA Division I baseball tournament.

== Format and seeding ==
All eight baseball teams in The American were seeded based on their records in conference play. The tournament used a two bracket double-elimination format, leading to a single championship game between the winners of each bracket. South Florida claimed the seventh seed over UCF by virtue of owning the third tie-breaker (season series tied 3-3; both teams 0–3 versus Tulane; USF 2–1 versus East Carolina, UCF 0–3 versus East Carolina).

Team	W	L	T	Pct	GB	Seed
Tulane	15	7	0	.682	—	1
East Carolina	15	8	1	.646	.5	2
Connecticut	14	9	0	.609	1.5	3
Cincinnati	13	10	1	.563	2.5	4
Houston	11	12	0	.478	4.5	5
Memphis	9	15	0	.375	7	6
South Florida	8	16	0	.333	8	7
UCF	8	16	0	.333	8	8

== Bracket ==
First round
1	Tulane	4
8	UCF	3
5	Houston	9
4	Cincinnati	1
8	UCF	7
4	Cincinnati	6
2	East Carolina	2
7	South Florida	4
6	Memphis	2
3	Connecticut	6
2	East Carolina	4
6	Memphis	5

Second round
1	Tulane	3
5	Houston	5
8	UCF	0
1	Tulane	5
7	South Florida	1
3	Connecticut	9
6	Memphis	7
7	South Florida	5

Semifinals
5	Houston	6	—
1	Tulane	2	—
3	Connecticut	5	5
6	Memphis	9	0

Final
5	Houston	2
3	Connecticut	7

== All-Tournament Team ==
The following players were named to the All-Tournament Team.

Pos	Name	School
P	Anthony Kay	Connecticut
P	Nick Hernandez	Houston
IF	Bryan Daniello	Connecticut
IF	Aaron Hill	Connecticut
IF	Bobby Melley	Connecticut
IF	Brandon Grudzielanek	Memphis
OF	John Toppa	Connecticut
OF	Zac Taylor	Houston
OF	Connor Wong	Houston
C	Jake Rogers	Tulane
UTY	Joe Davis	Houston
