= 2013 Texas Tech Red Raiders baseball team =

American college baseball season

2013 Texas Tech Red Raiders baseball
- Conference: Big 12 Conference
- Record: 26–30 (9–15 Big 12)
- Head coach: Tim Tadlock (1st season)
- Assistant coach: J-Bob Thomas (1st season)
- Hitting coach: Russel Raley (1st season)
- Pitching coach: Ray Hayward (1st season)
- Home stadium: Dan Law Field at Rip Griffin Park

2013 Big 12 Conference baseball standings
	Conf.				Overall
Team	W		L	PCT	W		L	PCT
No. 15 Kansas State ‍†‍‍^{y}	16	–	8	.667	45	–	19	.703
No. 22 Oklahoma State ‍‍‍^{y}	13	–	10	.565	41	–	19	.683
West Virginia ‍‍‍	13	–	11	.542	33	–	26	.559
No. 16 Oklahoma ‍‍‡‍^{y}	13	–	11	.542	43	–	21	.672
Baylor ‍‍‍	12	–	11	.522	27	–	28	.491
Kansas ‍‍‍	12	–	12	.500	34	–	25	.576
TCU ‍‍‍	12	–	12	.500	29	–	28	.509
Texas Tech ‍‍‍	9	–	15	.375	26	–	30	.464
Texas ‍‍‍	7	–	17	.292	27	–	24	.529
† – Conference champion ‡ – Tournament champion y – Invited to the NCAA tournament Rankings from Collegiate Baseball

The 2013 Texas Tech Red Raiders baseball team represented Texas Tech University during the 2013 NCAA Division I baseball season. The Red Raiders played their home games at Dan Law Field at Rip Griffin Park as a member of the Big 12 Conference. The team was led by head coach Tim Tadlock in his first season as the team's head coach. As of the conclusion of the 2024 season, this is the team's only losing season under Tadlock.

In March, the team had a 2–1 series win over the Texas Longhorns in Austin. This was the Red Raiders' first series win over Texas in Austin since 2001 and the program's first series win over the Longhorns since 2002.

== Previous season ==
The 2012 baseball team finished the season with a record of 29–26. In Big 12 play, the team finished 7–17, finishing in eighth place tied with Kansas State. The team was not invited to the Big 12 tournament as Kansas State held the tiebreaker over Texas Tech, having won the regular season series. The 2012 team only won one series in Big 12 play.

Head coach Dan Spencer was fired following the season, finishing his tenure at Texas Tech with an overall record of 115–112 and Big 12 record of 44–61 through four seasons.

== Roster ==
2013 Texas Tech Red Raiders Baseball Roster
Pitchers: 12 Eric Gutierrez (LHP) – freshman (5'8); 13 Dalton Brown (RHP) – freshman (6'3); 16 Trey Masek (RHP) – junior (6'1); 25 Andre Wheeler (LHP) – junior (6'1); 26 Jerad McCrummen (RHP) – senior (6'1); 30 Jonny Drozd (LHP) – junior (6'7); 32 Justin Bethard (RHP) – freshman (6'0); 34 Corey Taylor (RHP) – sophomore (6'2); 35 Matt Withrow (RHP) – freshman (6'3); 37 Matt Custred (RHP) – freshman (6'4); 38 Johnathon Tripp (RHP) – freshman (6'5); 40 Dominic Moreno (RHP) – sophomore (5'10); 42 Joey Zurawik (RHP) – freshman (5'10); 44 Nathan Bauder (RHP) – freshman (5'10); 45 Heath Herrington (RHP) – junior (6'0); 46 Reid Meyer (LHP) – freshman (6'2)	Catchers: 5 Jarrard Poteete – freshman (6'1); 14 Elliot Richoux – sophomore (6'0); 18 Mason Randoloh – junior (6'1); Infielders: 1 Tim Proudfoot – sophomore (5'10); 3 Scott Lejeune – (redshirt) senior (6'1); 7 Wade Stramp – sophomore (6'2); 8 Alec Humphreys – freshman (5'9); 9 Bryant Burleson – sophomore (5'9); 11 Jake Barrios – junior (6'0); 20 A. J. Florence – junior (5'9); 36 Blake Bass – sophomore (6'7); Outfielders: 2 Brett Bell – sophomore (5'10); 4 Todd Ritchie – junior (5'7); 10 Tyler Neslony – freshman (6'0); 18 Zach Davis – freshman (5'8); 21 Brennan Moore – senior (6'0); 28 Devon Conley – junior (6'0)

== Schedule and results ==
2013 Texas Tech Red Raiders baseball game log: 26–30
Regular season: 25–28

February: 5–4
Date	Time	Opponent	Stadium/Site	Score	Win	Loss	Save	Attendance	Overall record	Big 12 Record	Ref
February 15	6:00 PM	Northern Illinois	Dan Law Field at Rip Griffin Park • Lubbock, TX	8–0	**Moreno** (1–0)	Badgley (0–1)	**Bauder** (1)	2,459	1–0	—	
February 16	2:00 PM	Northern Colorado	Dan Law Field at Rip Griffin Park • Lubbock, TX	10–1	**Taylor** (1–0)	Hawkins (0–1)	**Custred** (1)	2,617	2–0	—	
February 16	6:00 PM	BYU	Dan Law Field at Rip Griffin Park • Lubbock, TX	5–1	**Masek** (1–0)	Miller (0–1)	**Tripp** (1)	2,775	3–0	—	
February 17	1:00 PM	Northern Illinois	Dan Law Field at Rip Griffin Park • Lubbock, TX	13–0	**Withrow** (1–0)	Klonowski (0–1)	—	2,571	4–0	—	
February 22	11:00 AM	vs. Troy; UCF Wawa Weekend Classic	Jay Bergman Field • Orlando, FL	3–10	Starling (2–0)	**Moreno** (1–1)	—	441	4–1	—	
February 23	5:30 PM	at UCF; UCF Wawa Weekend Classic	Jay Bergman Field • Orlando, FL	8–13	Davis (2–0)	**Taylor** (1–1)	Matulis (1)	1,844	4–2	—	
February 24	1:00 PM	vs. Connecticut; UCF Wawa Weekend Classic	Jay Bergman Field • Orlando, FL	0–1(11)	Moore (1–0)	**McCrummen** (0–1)	Tabakman (1)	207	4–3	—	
February 25	5:00 PM	at FIU	FIU Baseball Stadium • Miami, FL	7–9	Sullivan (2–1)	**Withrow** (1–1)	Gomez (4)	432	4–4	—	
February 26	2:00 PM	at FIU	FIU Baseball Stadium • Miami, FL	8–6	**Drozd** (1–0)	Caballero (0–1)	**Tripp** (2)	383	5–4	—	

March: 12–9
Date	Time	Opponent	Stadium/Site	Score	Win	Loss	Save	Attendance	Overall record	Big 12 Record	Ref
March 1	6:30 PM	La Salle	Dan Law Field at Rip Griffin Park • Lubbock, TX	5–6 (12)	Christensen (1–0)	**Taylor** (1–2)	—	2,300	5–5	—	
March 2	6:30 PM	La Salle	Dan Law Field at Rip Griffin Park • Lubbock, TX	3–0	**Masek** (2–0)	Hollman (0–1)	—	2,430	6–5	—	
March 3	1:00 PM	La Salle	Dan Law Field at Rip Griffin Park • Lubbock, TX	7–0	**Withrow** (2–1)	O'Neill (0–1)	—	2,419	7–5	—	
March 5	7:00 PM	at #18 Arizona	Hi Corbett Field • Tucson, AZ	2–6	Crawford (2–1)	**Drozd** (1–1)	—	2,131	7–6	—	
March 6	2:00 PM	at #18 Arizona	Hi Corbett Field • Tucson, AZ	5–2	**Wheeler** (1–0)	Cunningham (0–2)	**McCrummen** (1)	1,887	8–6	—	
March 8	6:30 PM	UT Arlington	Dan Law Field at Rip Griffin Park • Lubbock, TX	8–3	**Custred** (1–0)	Nack (2–2)	—	2,414	9–6	—	
March 9	6:30 PM	UT Arlington	Dan Law Field at Rip Griffin Park • Lubbock, TX	4–1	**Masek** (3–0)	Thompson (1–1)	—	2,462	10–6	—	
March 10	2:00 PM	UT Arlington	Dan Law Field at Rip Griffin Park • Lubbock, TX	12–13	Beck (1–0)	**McCrummen** (0–2)	—	2,265	10–7	—	
March 12	6:30 PM	Utah Valley	Dan Law Field at Rip Griffin Park • Lubbock, TX	9–2	**Drozd** (2–1)	Gunn (1–3)	—	1,685	11–7	—	
March 13	6:30 PM	Utah Valley	Dan Law Field at Rip Griffin Park • Lubbock, TX	6–0	**Taylor** (2–2)	Nelson (1–1)	—	1,812	12–7	—	
March 15	6:35 PM	Texas	UFCU Disch–Falk Field • Austin, TX	1–0	**Moreno** (2–1)	Marlow (1–1)	**McCrummen** (2)	6,550	13–7	1–0	
March 16	2:00 PM	Texas	UFCU Disch–Falk Field • Austin, TX	1–2	Knebel (2–1)	**Tripp** (0–1)	—	6,842	13–8	1–1	
March 17	1:00 PM	Texas	UFCU Disch–Falk Field • Austin, TX	4–2	**Drozd** (3–1)	Thornhill (1–2)	**McCrummen** (3)	6,373	14–8	2–1	
March 19	6:30 PM	#22 Arizona State	Dan Law Field at Rip Griffin Park • Lubbock, TX	8–7	**McCrummen** (1–2)	Burr (0–1)	—	2,624	15–8	—	
March 22	5:30 PM	at West Virginia	Appalachian Power Park • Charleston, WV	0–2	Musgrave (3–1)	**Moreno** (2–2)	Paul (3)	612	15–9	2–2	
March 23	12:00 PM	at West Virginia	Appalachian Power Park • Charleston, WV	6–4 (10)	**Wheeler** (2–0)	Dierdorff (1–3)	—	785	16–9	3–2	
March 23	3:00 PM	at West Virginia	Appalachian Power Park • Charleston, WV	1–3	Means (3–1)	**Withrow** (2–2)	Dierdorff (1)	1,095	16–10	3–3	
March 25	7:00 PM	at New Mexico	Presley Askew Field • Las Cruces, NM	6–7	Bradley (2–3)	**McCrummen** (1–3)	—	317	16–11	—	
March 29	6:37 PM	TCU	Dan Law Field at Rip Griffin Park • Lubbock, TX	1–4	Morrison (4–1)	**Taylor** (2–3)	Ferrell (1)	2,668	16–12	3–4	
March 30	6:30 PM	TCU	Dan Law Field at Rip Griffin Park • Lubbock, TX	3–7	Frey (1–1)	**Drozd** (3–2)	—	3,267	16–13	3–5	
March 31	1:35 PM	TCU	Dan Law Field at Rip Griffin Park • Lubbock, TX	8–7	**Wheeler** (3–0)	Young (3–3)	**Tripp** (3)	2,595	17–13	4–5	

April: 4–11
Date	Time	Opponent	Stadium/Site	Score	Win	Loss	Save	Attendance	Overall record	Big 12 Record	Ref
April 2	4:00 PM	at New Mexico	Santa Ana Star Field • Albuquerque, NM	3–10	Bridges (1–1)	**Custred** (1–1)	—	479	17–14	—	
April 5	6:30 PM	at Kansas State	Tointon Family Stadium • Manhattan, KS	5–6	Matthys (4–0)	**McCrummen** (1–4)	—	3,866	17–15	4–6	
April 6	2:00 PM	at Kansas State	Tointon Family Stadium • Manhattan, KS	2–15	Wivinis (5–1)	**Drozd** (3–3)	Nixon (1)	1,950	17–16	4–7	
April 7	1:00 PM	at Kansas State	Tointon Family Stadium • Manhattan, KS	2–12 (8)	McFadden (3–1)	**Taylor** (2–4)	—	1,240	17–17	4–8	
April 9	6:30 PM	at Dallas Baptist	Horner Ballpark • Dallas, TX	9–10	Webster (2–1)	**Withrow** (2–3)	Smith (2)	1,107	17–18	—	
April 14	6:30 PM	Lubbock Christian	Dan Law Field at Rip Griffin Park • Lubbock, TX	5–6	McCasland (2–1)	**McCrummen** (1–5)	Forsyth (1)	2,680	17–19	—	
April 16	6:35 PM	at #22 Rice	Reckling Park • Houston, TX	2–11	Kubitza (5–2)	**Bethard** (0–1)	—	3,208	17–20	—	
April 19	6:37 PM	Kansas	Dan Law Field at Rip Griffin Park • Lubbock, TX	3–4	Taylor (4–0)	**Drozd** (3–4)	Piche' (8)	2,750	17–21	4–9	
April 20	6:30 PM	Kansas	Dan Law Field at Rip Griffin Park • Lubbock, TX	1–6	Benjamin (4–4)	**Wheeler** (3–1)	—	2,950	17–22	4–10	
April 21	1:00 PM	Kansas	Dan Law Field at Rip Griffin Park • Lubbock, TX	16–5 (8)	**Tripp** (1–1)	Morovick (2–2)	—	2,602	18–22	5–10	
April 23	6:00 PM	New Mexico State	Dan Law Field at Rip Griffin Park • Lubbock, TX	6–1	**Wheeler** (4–1)	Bradley (4–4)	**Brown** (1)	2,257	19–22	—	
April 26	6:30 PM	at #11 Oklahoma	L. Dale Mitchell Baseball Park • Norman, OK	0–8	Fisher (1–1)	**Drozd** (3–5)	—	1,285	19–23	5–11	
April 27	2:00 PM	at #11 Oklahoma	L. Dale Mitchell Baseball Park • Norman, OK	2–6	Gray (8–1)	**Masek** (3–1)	Evans (8)	2,668	19–24	5–12	
April 28	1:00 PM	at #11 Oklahoma	L. Dale Mitchell Baseball Park • Norman, OK	9–3	**Moreno** (3–2)	Carnes (2–2)	—	1,774	20–24	6–12	
April 30	6:37 PM	#18 New Mexico	Dan Law Field at Rip Griffin Park • Lubbock, TX	12–8	**Withrow** (3–3)	Baumgartner (2–4)	—	2,320	21–24	—	

May: 4–4
Date	Time	Opponent	Stadium/Site	Score	Win	Loss	Save	Attendance	Overall record	Big 12 Record	Ref
May 3	6:37 PM	Oklahoma State	Dan Law Field at Rip Griffin Park • Lubbock, TX	5–2	**Masek** (4–1)	Hursh (4–4)	—	2,420	22–24	7–12	
May 4	6:36 PM	Oklahoma State	Dan Law Field at Rip Griffin Park • Lubbock, TX	5–11	Nurdin (2–2)	**Moreno** (3–3)	—	2,944	22–25	7–13	
May 5	2:00 PM	Oklahoma State	Dan Law Field at Rip Griffin Park • Lubbock, TX	0–3	Robinette (5–0)	**Tripp** (1–2)	—	2,816	22–26	7–14	
May 7	3:00 PM	Dallas Baptist	Dan Law Field at Rip Griffin Park • Lubbock, TX	7–2	**Withrow** (4–3)	Taylor (1–3)	—	2,226	23–26	—	
May 15	8:30 PM	at #15 Arizona State	Packard Stadium • Tempe, AZ	5–8	McCreery (2–3)	**Custred** (1–2)	Burr (11)	1,821	23–27	—	
May 16	6:37 PM	Baylor	Dan Law Field at Rip Griffin Park • Lubbock, TX	17–5	**Masek** (5–1)	Garner (3–6)	—	2,427	24–27	8–14	
May 17	6:30 PM	Baylor	Dan Law Field at Rip Griffin Park • Lubbock, TX	7–1	**Drozd** (4–5)	Newman (3–3)	**Moreno** (1)	2,817	25–27	9–14	
May 18	12:06 PM	Baylor	Dan Law Field at Rip Griffin Park • Lubbock, TX	8–15	Bare (6–2)	**Taylor** (2–5)	—	2,727	25–28	9–15	

Post–season: 1–2

Big 12 Tournament: 1–2
Date	Time	Opponent	Rank	Stadium/Site	Score	Win	Loss	Save	Attendance	Overall record	B12T Record	Ref
May 23	3:20 PM	vs. #17 (1) Kansas State	(8)	Chickasaw Bricktown Ballpark • Oklahoma City, OK	3–4	McFadden (6–2)	**Masek** (5–2)	Matthys (7)	3,637	25–29	0–1	
May 24	9:00 AM	vs. (4) Oklahoma	(8)	Chickasaw Bricktown Ballpark • Oklahoma City, OK	0–8	Overton (9–2)	**Moreno** (3–4)	—	3,707	25–30	0–2	
May 25	9:00 AM	vs. (5) Baylor	(8)	Chickasaw Bricktown Ballpark • Oklahoma City, OK	8–2	**Withrow** (5–3)	Stone (3–3)	**Drozd** (1)	4,119	26–30	1–2	

Legend: = Win = Loss = Postponement
Bold = Texas Tech team member

"#" represents ranking. All rankings from Collegiate Baseball on the date of the contest.
"()" represents postseason seeding in the Big 12 Tournament.
