= 2013 West Virginia Mountaineers baseball team =

American college baseball season

2013 West Virginia Mountaineers baseball
- Conference: Big 12 Conference
- Record: 33-26 (13-11 Big 12)
- Head coach: Randy Mazey (1st season)
- Assistant coaches: Derek Matlock (1st season); Steven Trout (1st season); Daniel Carte (1st season)
- Home stadium: Hawley Field; Appalachian Power Park; Linda K. Epling Stadium

2013 Big 12 Conference baseball standings
	Conf.				Overall
Team	W		L	PCT	W		L	PCT
No. 15 Kansas State ‍†‍‍^{y}	16	–	8	.667	45	–	19	.703
No. 22 Oklahoma State ‍‍‍^{y}	13	–	10	.565	41	–	19	.683
West Virginia ‍‍‍	13	–	11	.542	33	–	26	.559
No. 16 Oklahoma ‍‍‡‍^{y}	13	–	11	.542	43	–	21	.672
Baylor ‍‍‍	12	–	11	.522	27	–	28	.491
Kansas ‍‍‍	12	–	12	.500	34	–	25	.576
TCU ‍‍‍	12	–	12	.500	29	–	28	.509
Texas Tech ‍‍‍	9	–	15	.375	26	–	30	.464
Texas ‍‍‍	7	–	17	.292	27	–	24	.529
† – Conference champion ‡ – Tournament champion y – Invited to the NCAA tournament Rankings from Collegiate Baseball

The 2013 West Virginia Mountaineers baseball team represented West Virginia University during the 2013 NCAA Division I baseball season. The Mountaineers were competing in their first year as members of the Big 12 Conference. Playing their non conference home games at Hawley Field in Morgantown, West Virginia and their conference home games at Appalachian Power Park in Charleston, West Virginia. They were led by head coach Randy Mazey, in his 1st season at West Virginia.

== Preseason ==
=== Coaches poll ===
Coaches' Poll
Predicted finish	Team	Points
1	Oklahoma	62 (6)
2	TCU	55 (3)
3	Texas	48
4	Baylor	47
5	Oklahoma State	38
6	Texas Tech	28
7	Kansas State	20
8	Kansas	18
9	West Virginia	8

== Roster ==
2013 West Virginia Mountaineers baseball team
Players
Coaches

#	Pos.	Name	B/T	Height	Weight	Year	Home town
2	INF	Michael Constantini	/	6 ft 1 in (1.85 m)	180 lb (82 kg)	Jr	Yardville, NJ
3	OF	Taylor Munden	/	5 ft 11 in (1.8 m)	190 lb (86 kg)	So	Lewisville, TX
4	OF	Bobby Boyd	/	5 ft 9 in (1.75 m)	170 lb (77 kg)	So	Silver Spring, MD
5	INF	Alex Stephens	/	6 ft 0 in (1.83 m)	185 lb (84 kg)	Fr	Wheeling, WV
9	RHP	Corey Walter	/	6 ft 3 in (1.91 m)	215 lb (98 kg)	Jr	Wheeling, WV
10	INF	Billy Fleming	/	6 ft 1 in (1.85 m)	195 lb (88 kg)	So	Churchville, PA
11	LHP	Harrison Musgrave	/	6 ft 1 in (1.85 m)	205 lb (93 kg)	So	Bridgeport, WV
12		Ryan Tuntland	/	6 ft 1 in (1.85 m)	190 lb (86 kg)	Jr	Des Plaines, IL
15	RHP	Pascal Paul	/	6 ft 2 in (1.88 m)	200 lb (91 kg)	Jr	Merrill, WI
17	LHP	Marshall Thompson	/	6 ft 3 in (1.91 m)	215 lb (98 kg)	Jr	Denton, MD
18	LHP	Cale Russell	/	5 ft 11 in (1.8 m)	185 lb (84 kg)	Jr	Norman, OK
19	C	Max Nogay	/	5 ft 11 in (1.8 m)	210 lb (95 kg)	So	Weirton, WV
21		Justin Fox	/	5 ft 10 in (1.78 m)	185 lb (84 kg)	So	New Martinsville, WV
22	RHP	Dan Dierdorff	/	5 ft 9 in (1.75 m)	160 lb (73 kg)	Sr	Mount Wolf, PA
23	OF	Brady Wilson	/	5 ft 11 in (1.8 m)	165 lb (75 kg)	Sr	Frederick, MD
24	OF	Jacob Rice	/	6 ft 3 in (1.91 m)	200 lb (91 kg)	Jr	Tulsa, OK
25	RHP	Josh Harlow	/	6 ft 0 in (1.83 m)	195 lb (88 kg)	Jr	Shinnston, WV
27	RHP	Ryan Tezak	/	6 ft 3 in (1.91 m)	220 lb (100 kg)	Jr	Hershey, PA
28	INF	Nate Antone	/	6 ft 4 in (1.93 m)	210 lb (95 kg)	Jr	Vandergrift, PA
29	RHP	Corey Holmes	/	6 ft 6 in (1.98 m)	200 lb (91 kg)	Jr	Waco, TX
30	OF	Billy Sager	/	5 ft 10 in (1.78 m)	205 lb (93 kg)	Fr	Kenova, WV
32	OF	Kevin Cohen	/	5 ft 10 in (1.78 m)	165 lb (75 kg)	Jr	Wantagh, NY
34	RHP	Ryan Hostrander	/	6 ft 3 in (1.91 m)	215 lb (98 kg)	Fr	Williamsport, PA
35	RHP	Sean Carley	/	6 ft 4 in (1.93 m)	245 lb (111 kg)	Jr	Melbourne, FL
36	RHP	Brock Dykxhoorn	/	6 ft 8 in (2.03 m)	225 lb (102 kg)	Fr	Goderich, Ontario
38	LHP	Zach Bargeron	/	6 ft 2 in (1.88 m)	205 lb (93 kg)	Jr	Manassas, VA
40	OF	Chris Rasky	/	6 ft 5 in (1.96 m)	215 lb (98 kg)	Sr	Irwin, PA
42	C	Ray Guerrini	/	6 ft 1 in (1.85 m)	195 lb (88 kg)	Fr	Highland Heights, OH
43	LHP	John Means	/	6 ft 3 in (1.91 m)	215 lb (98 kg)	So	Olathe, KS
44		Shaun Wood	/	6 ft 6 in (1.98 m)	215 lb (98 kg)	Fr	Arlington, VA
45	RHP	Jared Hill	/	6 ft 0 in (1.83 m)	205 lb (93 kg)	Jr	Harrisburg, OH
46	INF	Ryan McBroom	/	6 ft 3 in (1.91 m)	220 lb (100 kg)	Jr	Fredericksburg, VA
47	OF	Matt Frazer	/	5 ft 10 in (1.78 m)	178 lb (81 kg)	Sr	Alum Creek, WV
48	C	Alan Filauro	/	6 ft 2 in (1.88 m)	210 lb (95 kg)	Sr	South Salem, NY
49	RHP	Michael Teagle	/	6 ft 5 in (1.96 m)	195 lb (88 kg)	Fr	Houston, TX
50	RHP	Tad Dipzinski	/	6 ft 1 in (1.85 m)	200 lb (91 kg)	So	Davison, MI

Head coach

Randy Mazey

Assistant coach(es)

Derek Matlock

Legend

- (C) Team captain
- (S) Suspended
- (I) Ineligible
- Injured
- Current redshirt

== Awards ==
=== National Honors ===
Harrison Musgrave LHP -
2nd Team All-American (Louisville Slugger)
Honorable Mention (College Baseball Insider)

=== Big 12 Pitcher of the Year ===
Harrison Musgrave

== Hawley Field ==
West Virginia joined the Big 12 Conference following the 2012 season. Since Hawley Field does not meet Big 12 Conference standards, and the state legislature turned down a plan for a taxpayer funded replacement, the Mountaineers played three of their four 2013 home conference series at Appalachian Power Park in Charleston and one at Linda K. Epling Stadium in Beckley (160 and 185 miles from campus, respectively). Non-conference games continued to be played at Hawley Field. In 2013, plans were announced to build a new venue in the nearby town of Granville for the Mountaineers baseball team. The new park, ultimately known as Monongalia County Ballpark, was opened during the 2015 season.

== Attendance ==
In 2013, the Mountaineers ranked 50th among Division I baseball programs in attendance, averaging 1,328 per home game.
