= 2013 Texas Longhorns baseball team =

American college baseball season

2013 Texas Longhorns baseball
- Conference: Big 12 Conference
- Record: 27–24 (7–17 Big 12)
- Head coach: Augie Garrido (17th season)
- Assistant coaches: Skip Johnson (7th season); Tommy Nicholson (1st season)
- Home stadium: UFCU Disch–Falk Field

2013 Big 12 Conference baseball standings
	Conf.				Overall
Team	W		L	PCT	W		L	PCT
No. 15 Kansas State ‍†‍‍^{y}	16	–	8	.667	45	–	19	.703
No. 22 Oklahoma State ‍‍‍^{y}	13	–	10	.565	41	–	19	.683
West Virginia ‍‍‍	13	–	11	.542	33	–	26	.559
No. 16 Oklahoma ‍‍‡‍^{y}	13	–	11	.542	43	–	21	.672
Baylor ‍‍‍	12	–	11	.522	27	–	28	.491
Kansas ‍‍‍	12	–	12	.500	34	–	25	.576
TCU ‍‍‍	12	–	12	.500	29	–	28	.509
Texas Tech ‍‍‍	9	–	15	.375	26	–	30	.464
Texas ‍‍‍	7	–	17	.292	27	–	24	.529
† – Conference champion ‡ – Tournament champion y – Invited to the NCAA tournament Rankings from Collegiate Baseball

The 2013 Texas Longhorns baseball team represented the Texas Longhorns baseball program for the University of Texas in the 2013 NCAA Division I baseball season. Augie Garrido coached the team in his 17th season at Texas.

== Personnel ==
=== Roster ===
2013 Texas Longhorns Roster
Pitchers: 13 – Kirby Bellow – Junior; 15 – Justin Peters – Junior; 17 – Josh Urban – Senior; 19 – Holden Helmink – Freshman; 24 – Parker French – Sophomore; 27 – Travis Duke – Freshman; 29 – Corey Knebel – Junior; 31 – Chad Hollingsworth – Freshman; 32 – Dillon Peters – Sophomore; 36 – Nathan Thornhill – Junior; 37 – Toller Boardman – (redshirt) Freshman; 38 – Ty Culbreth – Freshman; 41 – Cameron Cox – Sophomore; 43 – John Curtiss – Sophomore; 48 – Ty Marlow – Junior	Catchers: 12 – Jacob Felts – Junior; 33 – Jeremy Montalbano – Freshman; 42 – Patrick Marsh – Senior; 45 – Grant Martin – Sophomore; 46 – James Barton – Freshman; Infielders: 6 – Erich Weiss – Junior; 8 – Brooks Marlow – Sophomore; 9 – C.J. Hinojosa – Freshman; 11 – Alex Silver – Junior; 13 – Codey McElroy – Sophomore; 35 – Madison Carter – Junior; 40 – Taylor Stell – Sophomore	Outfielders: 1 – Cohl Walla – Senior; 2 – Mark Payton – Junior; 4 – Collin Shaw – Sophomore; 7 – Weston Hall – Junior; 14 – Ben Johnson – Freshman; 30 – Landon Steinhagen – Senior; 34 – Matt Moynihan – Junior; 47 – Mark Gottsacker – Freshman

=== Coaches ===
2013 Texas Longhorns Coaching Staff
- Augie Garrido – Head coach – 17th
- Skip Johnson – Assistant coach – 7th
- Tommy Nicholson – Assistant coach – 1st
- Lucas Kephart – Student assistant coach – 2nd

== Schedule ==
2013 Texas Longhorns baseball game log
Legend: = Win = Loss = Canceled Bold = Texas team member
Regular season (27–24)

February (6–2)
Date	Time (CT)	TV	Opponent	Rank	Stadium	Score	Win	Loss	Save	Attendance	Overall record	Big 12 Record	Box Score	Recap
February 15	6:30 PM		Sacramento State*	No. 21	UFCU Disch–Falk Field • Austin, TX	**W** 6–5	**French (1–0)**	Mendonca (0–1)	**T. Marlow (1)**	5,638	1–0	—	Box Score	Recap
February 16	2:00 PM		Sacramento State*	No. 21	UFCU Disch–Falk Field • Austin, TX	**L** 3–5	Leitao (1–0)	**Thornhill (0–1)**	McLoughlin (1)	5,778	1–1	—	Box Score	Recap
February 17	1:00 PM		Sacramento State*	No. 21	UFCU Disch–Falk Field • Austin, TX	**W** 6–3	**D. Peters (1–0)**	Morgan (0–1)	—	5,667	2–1	—	Box Score	Recap
February 19	6:00 PM		UT Arlington*	No. 25	UFCU Disch–Falk Field • Austin, TX	**W** 2–1	**Hollingsworth (1–0)**	Nack (1–1)	**Knebel (1)**	5,057	3–1	—	Box Score	Recap
February 22	7:00 PM		Nebraska*	No. 25	UFCU Disch–Falk Field • Austin, TX	**W** 8–2	**French (2–0)**	Pierce (0–2)	**Knebel (2)**	6,004	4–1	—	Box Score	Recap
February 23	1:00 PM		Nebraska*	No. 25	UFCU Disch–Falk Field • Austin, TX	**W** 4–3	**Hollingsworth (2–0)**	Vogt (0–2)	—	6,718	5–1	—	Box Score	Recap
February 24	12:00 PM		Nebraska*	No. 25	UFCU Disch–Falk Field • Austin, TX	**W** 2–0	**Thornhill (1–1)**	Hander (0–1)	**Knebel (3)**	5,906	6–1	—	Box Score	Recap
February 26	5:00 PM		Sam Houston State*	No. 22	UFCU Disch–Falk Field • Austin, TX	**L** 3–5	Eppler (1–0)	**Cox (0–1)**	Simms (1)	4,987	6–2	—	Box Score	Recap

March (10–9)
Date	Time (CT)	TV	Opponent	Rank	Stadium	Score	Win	Loss	Save	Attendance	Overall record	Big 12 Record	Box Score	Recap
March 1	7:30 PM		at No. 14 Stanford*	No. 22	Klein Field at Sunken Diamond • Stanford, CA	**L** 0–2	Appel (2–1)	**French (2–1)**	—	1,867	6–3	—	Box Score	Recap
March 2	3:00 PM		at No. 14 Stanford*	No. 22	Klein Field at Sunken Diamond • Stanford, CA	**L** 2–7	Starwalt (2–0)	**D. Peters (1–1)**	Lindquist (2)	2,080	6–4	—	Box Score	Recap
March 3	3:00 PM		at No. 14 Stanford*	No. 22	Klein Field at Sunken Diamond • Stanford, CA	**L** 1–2	Hughes (2–0)	**Knebel (0–1)**	—	2,280	6–5	—	Box Score	Recap
March 5	4:30 PM		UT Pan American*		UFCU Disch–Falk Field • Austin, TX	**W** 6–1	**Hollingsworth (3–0)**	Street (2–1)	—	4,910	7–5	—	Box Score	Recap
March 8	7:00 PM		UC Santa Barbara*		UFCU Disch–Falk Field • Austin, TX	**W** 5–1	**French (3–1)**	Pettibone (2–1)	—	5,394	8–5	—	Box Score	Recap
March 9	2:00 PM		UC Santa Barbara*		UFCU Disch–Falk Field • Austin, TX	**W** 3–2	**T. Marlow (1–0)**	Hecht (0–1)	—	5,213	9–5	—	Box Score	Recap
March 10	12:00 PM		UC Santa Barbara*		UFCU Disch–Falk Field • Austin, TX	**W** 11–6	**Cox (1–1)**	Vasquez (1–2)	—	5,491	10–5	—	Box Score	Recap
March 12	6:00 PM		Oral Roberts*		UFCU Disch–Falk Field • Austin, TX	**W** 4–3	**Knebel (1–1)**	Smith (0–1)	—	5,873	11–5	—	Box Score	Recap
March 15	6:30 PM		Texas Tech		UFCU Disch–Falk Field • Austin, TX	**L** 0–1	Moreno (2–1)	**T. Marlow (1–1)**	McCrummen (2)	6,550	11–6	0–1	Box Score	Recap
March 16	2:00 PM		Texas Tech		UFCU Disch–Falk Field • Austin, TX	**W** 2–1	**Knebel (2–1)**	Tripp (0–1)	—	6,842	12–6	1–1	Box Score	Recap
March 17	1:00 PM		Texas Tech		UFCU Disch–Falk Field • Austin, TX	**L** 2–4	Drozd (3–1)	**Thornhill (1–2)**	McCrummen (3)	6,373	12–7	1–2	Box Score	Recap
March 19	6:30 PM		at Houston*		Cougar Field • Houston, TX	**L** 3–4	Garza (3–0)	**Hollingsworth (3–1)**	Wellbrock (2)	2,342	12–8	—	Box Score	Recap
March 22	6:30 PM		at Minnesota*		Hubert H. Humphrey Metrodome • Minneapolis, MN	**L** 1–5	Windle (3–2)	**Boardman (0–1)**	—	402	12–9	—	Box Score	Recap
March 23	2:00 PM		at Minnesota*		Hubert H. Humphrey Metrodome • Minneapolis, MN	**W** 5–4 ^{10}	**Knebel (3–1)**	Soule (0–2)	—	1,013	13–9	—	Box Score	Recap
March 24	1:00 PM		at Minnesota*		Hubert H. Humphrey Metrodome • Minneapolis, MN	**W** 6–3	**Thornhill (2–2)**	Crawford (0–1)	**Knebel (4)**	659	14–9	—	Box Score	Recap
March 26	6:00 PM		Texas State*		UFCU Disch–Falk Field • Austin, TX	**W** 5–3	**Cox (2–1)**	Morrow (1–1)	**Knebel (5)**	5,602	15–9	—	Box Score	Recap
March 28	6:30 PM		at No. 22 Oklahoma State		Allie P. Reynolds Stadium • Stillwater, OK	**W** 8–5	**Duke (1–0)**	Hursh (3–1)	**Knebel (6)**	1,112	16–9	2–2	Box Score	Recap
March 29	7:00 PM		at No. 22 Oklahoma State		Allie P. Reynolds Stadium • Stillwater, OK	**L** 3–8	Wheeland (3–0)	**D. Peters (1–2)**	McCurry (3)	1,921	16–10	2–3	Box Score	Recap
March 30	3:00 PM		at No. 22 Oklahoma State		Allie P. Reynolds Stadium • Stillwater, OK	**L** 4–5	Perrin (3–0)	**Thornhill (2–3)**	McCurry (4)	1,877	16–11	2–4	Box Score	Recap

April (7–9)
Date	Time (CT)	TV	Opponent	Rank	Stadium	Score	Win	Loss	Save	Attendance	Overall record	Big 12 Record	Box Score	Recap
April 2	7:00 PM		Texas A&M-Corpus Christi*		UFCU Disch–Falk Field • Austin, TX	Canceled (rain)								Recap
April 5	6:30 PM		No. 10 Oklahoma		UFCU Disch–Falk Field • Austin, TX	**L** 1–2	Gray (6–1)	**French (3–2)**	Evans (5)	6,411	16–12	2–5	Box Score	Recap
April 6	2:30 PM		No. 10 Oklahoma		UFCU Disch–Falk Field • Austin, TX	**W** 1–0	**D. Peters (2–2)**	Overton (6–2)	**Knebel (7)**	6,902	17–12	3–5	Box Score	Recap
April 7	2:00 PM		No. 10 Oklahoma		UFCU Disch–Falk Field • Austin, TX	**L** 2–4	Waltrip (2–1)	**Knebel (3–2)**	Evans (5)	6,246	17–13	3–6	Box Score	Recap
April 9	6:00 PM		Texas State*		UFCU Disch–Falk Field • Austin, TX	**W** 12–5	**Duke (2–0)**	Humpal (2–1)	—	5,293	18–13	—	Box Score	Recap
April 12	6:00 PM		at Kansas		Hoglund Ballpark • Lawrence, KS	**L** 6–7 ^{12}	Piche' (5–1)	**T. Marlow (1–2)**	—	1,069	18–14	3–7	Box Score	Recap
April 13	2:00 PM		at Kansas		Hoglund Ballpark • Lawrence, KS	**W** 2–1	**D. Peters (3–2)**	Benjamin (3–4)	—	1,374	19–14	4–7	Box Score	Recap
April 14	1:00 PM		at Kansas		Hoglund Ballpark • Lawrence, KS	**L** 3–4	Duncan (3–4)	**Thornhill (2–4)**	—	1,189	19–15	4–8	Box Score	Recap
April 16	6:00 PM		UT Pan American*		UFCU Disch–Falk Field • Austin, TX	**W** 6–1	**Urban (1–0)**	Daniels (0–3)	—	5,187	20–15	—	Box Score	Recap
April 19	7:00 PM		West Virginia		UFCU Disch–Falk Field • Austin, TX	**L** 0–1	Musgrave (6–1)	**French (3–3)**	—	5,641	20–16	4–9	Box Score	Recap
April 20	2:00 PM		West Virginia		UFCU Disch–Falk Field • Austin, TX	**W** 12–0	**D. Peters (4–2)**	Dierdorff (2–5)	—	6,747	21–16	5–9	Box Score	Recap
April 21	12:00 PM		West Virginia		UFCU Disch–Falk Field • Austin, TX	**L** 3–6 ^{10}	Walters (3–4)	**Knebel (3–3)**	Paul (6)	5,478	21–17	5–10	Box Score	Recap
April 23	6:00 PM		No. 30 Houston*		UFCU Disch–Falk Field • Austin, TX	**W** 4–0	**Duke (3–0)**	Garza (4–3)	—	5,266	22–17	—	Box Score	Recap
April 26	6:30 PM		at Baylor		Baylor Ballpark • Waco, TX	**L** 2–6	Garner (3–47)	**French (3–4)**	—	3,739	22–18	5–11	Box Score	Recap
April 27	8:00 PM		at Baylor		Baylor Ballpark • Waco, TX	**L** 0–1	Stone (3–2)	**D. Peters (4–3)**	Bare (2)	4,295	22–19	5–12	Box Score	Recap
April 28	2:00 PM		at Baylor		Baylor Ballpark • Waco, TX	**L** 2–5	Smith (2–3)	**Thornhill (2–5)**	Bare (3)	3,539	22–20	5–13	Box Score	Recap
April 30	6:00 PM		Prairie View A&M*		UFCU Disch–Falk Field • Austin, TX	**W** 1–0	**Duke (4–0)**	Lunsford (1–3)	**Knebel (8)**	5,189	23–20	—	Box Score	Recap

May (4–4)
Date	Time (CT)	TV	Opponent	Rank	Stadium	Score	Win	Loss	Save	Attendance	Overall record	Big 12 Record	Box Score	Recap
May 3	6:30 PM		Kansas State		UFCU Disch–Falk Field • Austin, TX	**L** 2–3	Matthys (7–0)	**Duke (4–1)**	—	5,451	23–21	5–14	Box Score	Recap
May 4	2:00 PM		Kansas State		UFCU Disch–Falk Field • Austin, TX	**W** 6–3	**D. Peters (5–3)**	Wivinis (6–2)	**T. Marlow (2)**	6,064	24–21	6–14	Box Score	Recap
May 5	1:00 PM		Kansas State		UFCU Disch–Falk Field • Austin, TX	**L** 3–9	Moore (3–0)	**Thornhill (2–6)**	—	5,710	24–22	6–15	Box Score	Recap
May 11	1:00 PM		Texas Southern*		UFCU Disch–Falk Field • Austin, TX	**W** 4–0 ^{7}	**French (4–4)**	Pearson (4–5)	**Knebel (9)**	5,921	25–22	—	Box Score	Recap
May 11	4:00 PM		Texas Southern*		UFCU Disch–Falk Field • Austin, TX	**W** 12–0	**D. Peters (6–3)**	Cruz IV (2–3)	—	5,921	26–22	—	Box Score	Recap
May 16	6:30 PM		at TCU		Lupton Stadium • Fort Worth, TX	**L** 1–5	Morrison (7–3)	**French (4–5)**	Scharf (1)	3,879	26–23	6–16	Box Score	Recap
May 17	6:30 PM		at TCU		Lupton Stadium • Fort Worth, TX	**L** 3–9	Young (7–4)	**Knebel (3–4)**	—	4,212	26–24	6–17	Box Score	Recap
May 18	3:30 PM		at TCU		Lupton Stadium • Fort Worth, TX	**W** 3–0	**Thornhill (3–6)**	Seidenberger (2–3)	—	4,694	27–24	7–17	Box Score	Recap

* indicates a non-conference game. All rankings from Collegiate Baseball on the date of the contest.

== Rankings ==
Ranking movements Legend: ██ Increase in ranking ██ Decrease in ranking
	Week																		
Poll	Pre	1	2	3	4	5	6	7	8	9	10	11	12	13	14	15	16	17	Final
Coaches'		*	23																
Baseball America																			
Collegiate Baseball^	21	25	22																
NCBWA†	26	29	25																

^ Collegiate Baseball ranked 40 teams in their preseason poll, but only ranked 30 teams weekly during the season.
† NCBWA ranks 30 teams in their preseason poll, but only ranks 25 teams weekly during the season.
* A new poll was not released for this week, so for comparison purposes, the previous week's ranking is inserted in this week's slot.
