= Jon Gray =

American baseball player (born 1991)

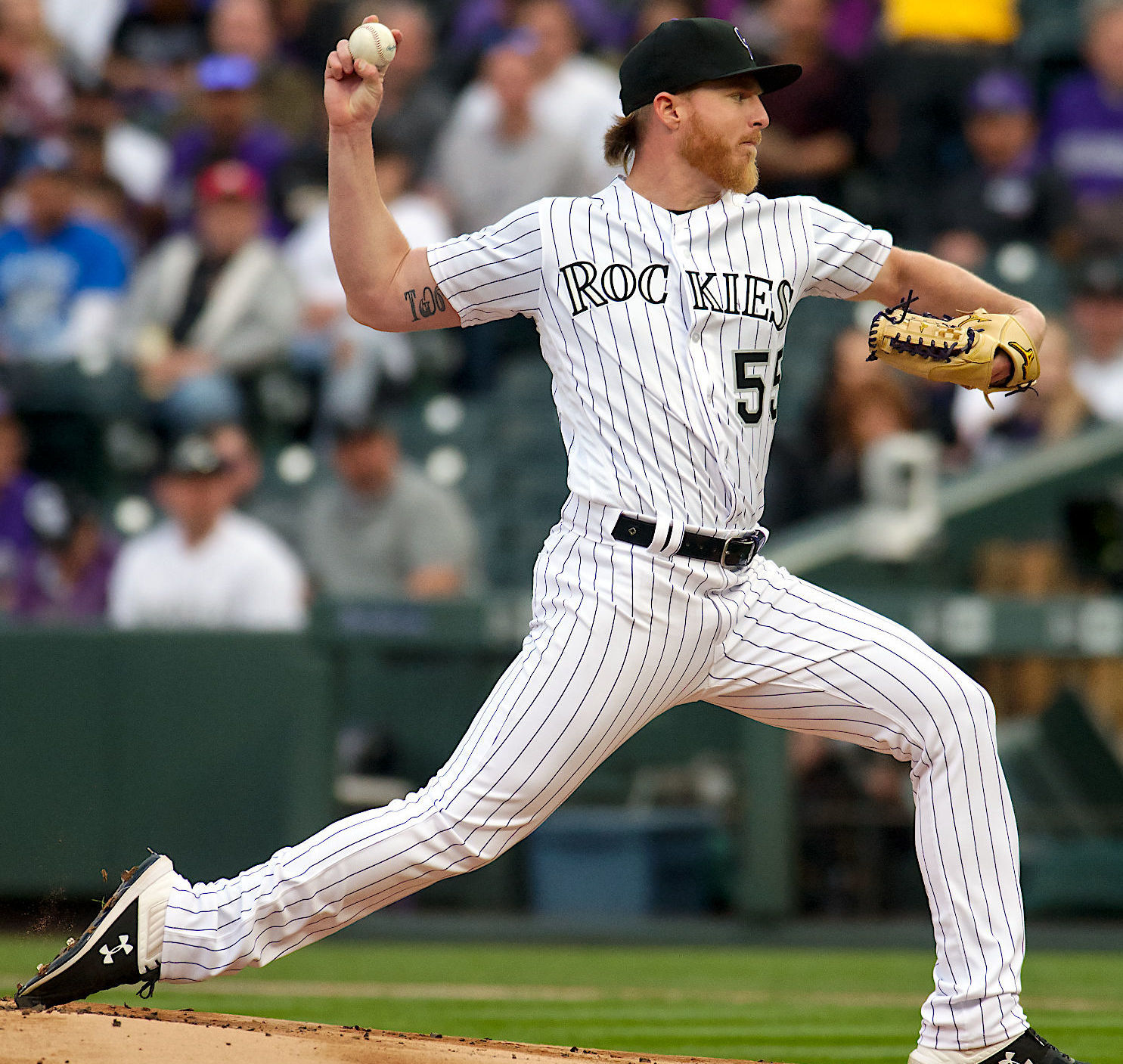
- Gray with the Colorado Rockies in 2019

Free agent
- Pitcher
- Born: November 5, 1991 (age 34); Shawnee, Oklahoma, U.S.
- Bats: Right Throws: Right

MLB debut
- August 4, 2015, for the Colorado Rockies

MLB statistics (through 2025 season)
- Win–loss record: 75–71
- Earned run average: 4.49
- Strikeouts: 1,223
- Stats at Baseball Reference

Teams
- Colorado Rockies (2015–2021); Texas Rangers (2022–2025)

Career highlights and awards
- World Series champion (2023)

Jonathan Charles Gray (born November 5, 1991) is an American professional baseball pitcher who is a free agent. He has previously played in Major League Baseball (MLB) for the Colorado Rockies and Texas Rangers.

Gray played college baseball for Eastern Oklahoma State College and the University of Oklahoma. The Rockies chose Gray with the third pick in the 2013 MLB draft, and he made his MLB debut in 2015. After pitching for the Rockies through the 2021 season, Gray signed with the Rangers as a free agent before the 2022 season.

== Early life ==
Jonathan Charles "Jon" Gray was born on November 5, 1991, in Shawnee, Oklahoma. Attending Chandler High School in Chandler, Oklahoma, Gray played baseball, basketball, and football for the Lions, focusing on baseball his senior year. That year, he was named the Little All-City Player of the Year by The Oklahoman and was named to the All-State Team.

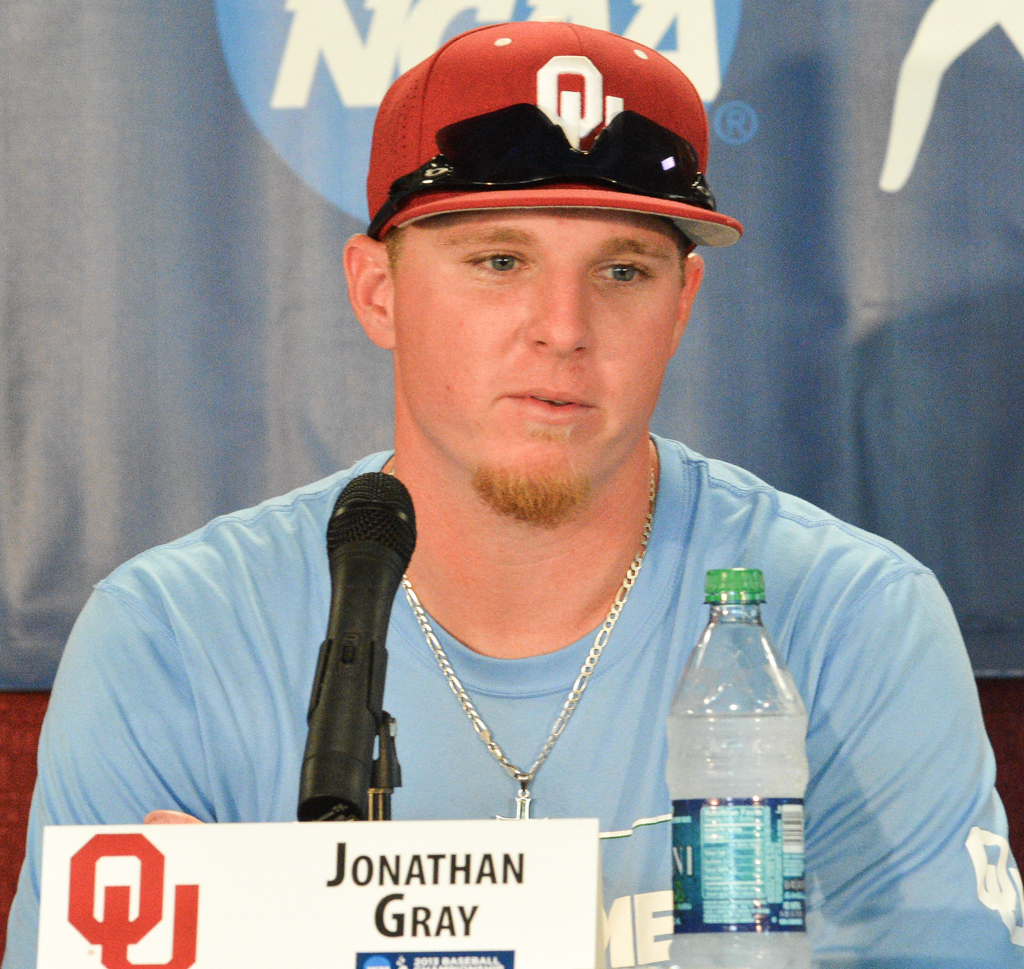
Gray at Oklahoma in 2013

The Kansas City Royals selected Gray in the 13th round of the 2010 Major League Baseball (MLB) Draft, but he did not sign. Oklahoma Sooners baseball coach Sunny Golloway encouraged Gray to enroll at Eastern Oklahoma State College, a junior college in Wilburton, Oklahoma, where he could continue to gain experience as a starting pitcher, as he would be used as a relief pitcher if he were to join the Sooners that season.

== College career ==
For Eastern Oklahoma, Gray pitched to a 6–2 win–loss record and a 2.89 earned run average (ERA). The New York Yankees drafted him in the 10th round of the 2011 MLB draft and offered him $500,000 to sign, but he instead opted to transfer to the University of Oklahoma. In his sophomore year at Oklahoma, Gray compiled a 3.16 ERA and 104 strikeouts in 102 2/3 innings pitched.

As a junior, Gray was named the Big 12 Conference Pitcher of the Week three times. He had a 10–3 win–loss record, a 1.64 ERA, and 147 strikeouts in 126 1/3 innings pitched. He was a first team All-American and a unanimous choice for the All-Big 12 team. He was named the Most Outstanding Player of the 2013 Big 12 Conference baseball tournament, as Oklahoma won the tournament for the first time since 1997. Gray also won the National Pitcher of the Year Award.

== Professional career ==
=== Draft and minor leagues ===
Gray was expected to be among the first players chosen in the 2013 MLB draft, and was considered by the Houston Astros, who had the first overall pick. The Colorado Rockies picked him with the third pick. Gray signed with the Rockies, receiving a $4.8 million signing bonus, which was below the recommended slot value for the pick. Gray made his professional debut with the Grand Junction Rockies of the Rookie-level Pioneer League in July, before receiving a promotion to the Modesto Nuts of the High–A California League later in the month. For Modesto, Gray pitched to a 0.75 ERA with 36 strikeouts in 24 innings.

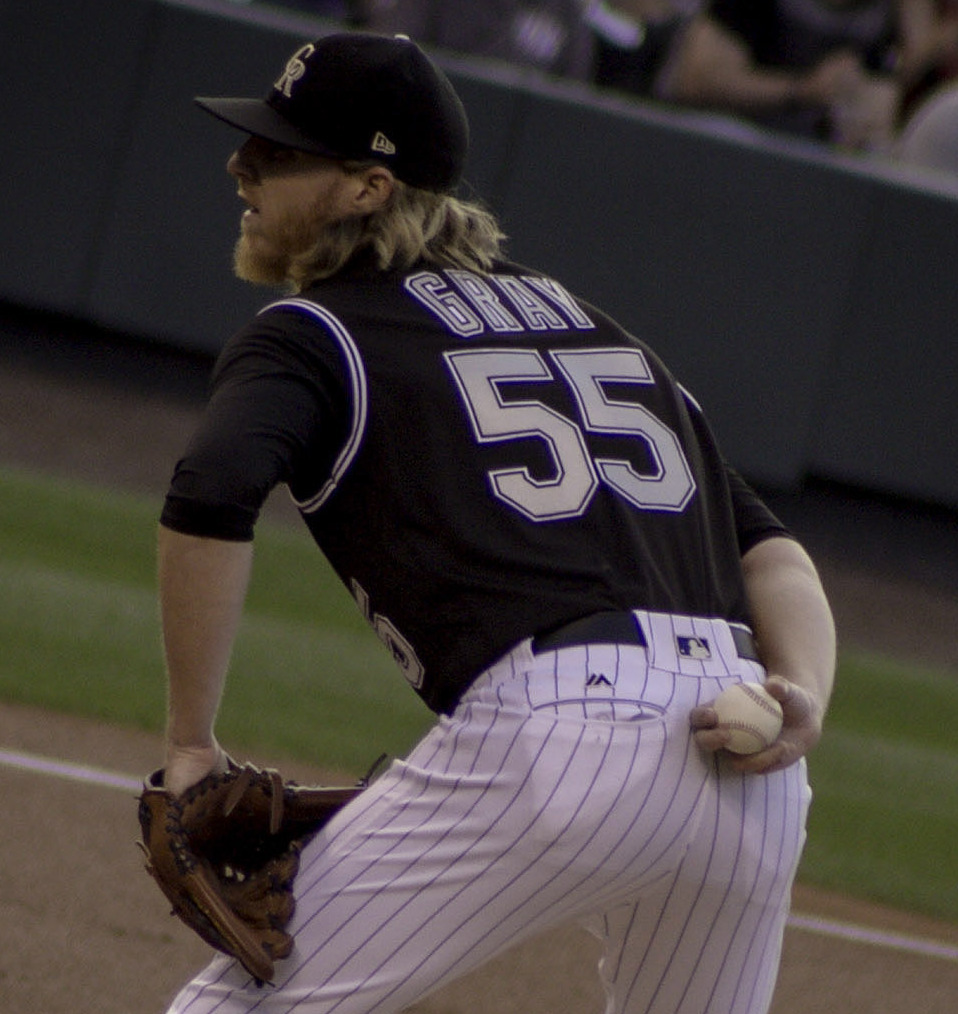
Gray in 2018

The Rockies invited Gray to spring training in 2014. They assigned him to the Tulsa Drillers of the Double–A Texas League for the 2014 season. He pitched to a 10–5 record, a 3.91 ERA, and 113 strikeouts in 124 1/3 innings. He missed the first round of the Texas League playoffs due to a tired shoulder. The Rockies invited Gray to spring training in 2015. They assigned him to the Albuquerque Isotopes of the Triple–A Pacific Coast League to start the 2015 season. Gray pitched to a 6–6 win–loss record with a 4.33 ERA and 110 strikeouts in 21 games, including a 2.70 ERA in his last six starts.

=== Colorado Rockies (2015–2021) ===
Gray made his major league debut with the Rockies on August 4, 2015. Focusing on his fastball and slider, Gray pitched to a 0–2 record and a 5.53 ERA in nine starts for the Rockies. During the 2015–16 offseason, Gray worked to add a curveball.

Gray missed the beginning of the 2016 season due to a strained abdominal muscle. On May 13, Gray earned his first career major league win in a 5–2 victory over the New York Mets. He finished the 2016 season with a 10–10 record, a 4.61 ERA, and 185 strikeouts in 168 innings pitched.

In 2017, the Rockies named Gray their Opening Day starting pitcher. He went on the disabled list in April with a stress fracture in his left foot. On July 5, Gray hit his first career home run off of Cincinnati Reds pitcher Scott Feldman, which measured 467 feet (142 m). Gray finished the season winning 10 games in 20 starts and a 3.67 ERA. Gray started for the Rockies in the 2017 National League Wild Card Game, which the Rockies lost to the Arizona Diamondbacks.

Gray started for the Rockies on Opening Day in 2018, but he began the 2018 season with a 5.77 ERA in his first 17 starts. On June 20, 2018, he was optioned to Triple-A Albuquerque. He was recalled on July 13. Gray ended the regular season with a 5.12 ERA and 27 home runs allowed. The Rockies did not include Gray on their postseason roster for the 2018 National League Division Series. In August 2019, Gray's season ended due to the diagnosis of a stress fracture in his left foot. In 2019, he had an 11–8 record and a 3.84 ERA in 25 starts. In 2020, Gray's season was cut short due to right shoulder inflammation as he pitched in only eight starts. He finished with a 2–4 record and a 6.69 ERA.

In 2021, Gray posted an ERA of 4.59 in 29 starts. He struck out 157 batters in 149 innings. After the season, the Rockies opted not to make a qualifying offer of $18.4 million for the 2022 season to Gray, and he became a free agent.

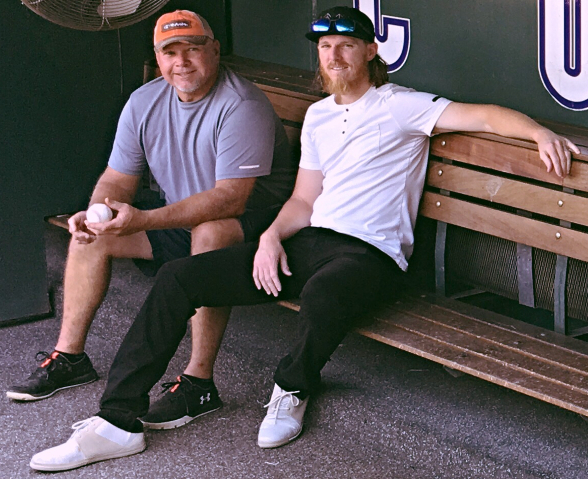
Gray (right) with his father at Coors Field

=== Texas Rangers (2022–present) ===
On December 1, 2021, Gray signed a four-year, $56 million contract with the Texas Rangers. He started for the Rangers on Opening Day, but developed a blister on his right middle finger during the game and went on the injured list the next day. He returned to make his second start for Texas on April 19, and went back on the injured list with a sprained medial collateral ligament in his left knee. Over 24 games for Texas in 2022, Gray posted a 7–7 record with a 3.96 ERA and 134 strikeouts over 127 1/3 innings.

Gray started 29 games for the Rangers during the 2023 campaign, compiling a 9-8 record and 4.12 ERA with 142 strikeouts across 157 1/3 innings pitched. Gray pitched three scoreless innings in relief in Game 3 of the 2023 World Series, earning the win.

Gray started the 2024 season off well but was removed from a game on May 21 and was later diagnosed with a mild right groin strain, landing on the 15-day injured list on May 23. On June 8, he was activated from the injured list but was later removed from a game on July 28 and placed on the 15-day injured list on July 29 with a right groin strain. On August 20, he was reinstated from the injured list, only to be placed back on the list on September 3, when manager Bruce Bochy revealed that both he and Tyler Mahle would miss the remainder of the 2024 season. Gray finished his 2024 season, pitching in 23 games (19 starts) to an ERA of 4.47, and recorded a record of 5-6. Over 102 2/3 innings, he had 86 strikeouts while walking only 28.

On March 14, 2025, Gray suffered a broken right wrist after being hit by a Michael Toglia line drive during a spring training game against the Colorado Rockies. He was transferred to the 60-day injured list to begin the season on March 18. Gray was activated for his season debut on July 23. On August 14, Gray was placed on waivers by Texas; he subsequently went unclaimed and remained with the team. In six total appearances for the team, he struggled to a 7.71 ERA and 1-1 record with 12 strikeouts over 14 innings of work. On August 17, Gray was placed on the injured list due to thoracic outlet syndrome.

== Personal life ==
Jon Gray is married to middle school sweetheart, Jacklyn. Gray’s father, Jack Gray, was a baseball player at Chandler High and later joined the United States military. His brother, Jack, played linebacker at Northeastern State University, and is currently one of the football coaches for their high school in Chandler. His sister, Brooke, played softball for Chandler and had also played for Barton Community College.
