= 2013 Big 12 Conference baseball tournament =

American college baseball tournament

- Teams: 8
- Format: Two four-team round-robin groups
- Finals site: Chickasaw Bricktown Ballpark; Oklahoma City, OK
- Champions: Oklahoma (2nd title)
- Winning coach: Sunny Golloway (1st title)
- MVP: Jonathan Gray (Oklahoma)
- Attendance: 56,859
- Television: Bracket Play: FCS Central; Championship: FSN

2013 Big 12 Conference baseball standings
	Conf.				Overall
Team	W		L	PCT	W		L	PCT
No. 15 Kansas State ‍†‍‍^{y}	16	–	8	.667	45	–	19	.703
No. 22 Oklahoma State ‍‍‍^{y}	13	–	10	.565	41	–	19	.683
West Virginia ‍‍‍	13	–	11	.542	33	–	26	.559
No. 16 Oklahoma ‍‍‡‍^{y}	13	–	11	.542	43	–	21	.672
Baylor ‍‍‍	12	–	11	.522	27	–	28	.491
Kansas ‍‍‍	12	–	12	.500	34	–	25	.576
TCU ‍‍‍	12	–	12	.500	29	–	28	.509
Texas Tech ‍‍‍	9	–	15	.375	26	–	30	.464
Texas ‍‍‍	7	–	17	.292	27	–	24	.529
† – Conference champion ‡ – Tournament champion y – Invited to the NCAA tournament Rankings from Collegiate Baseball

The 2013 Big 12 Conference baseball tournament was held from May 22 through 26 at Chickasaw Bricktown Ballpark in Oklahoma City, Oklahoma. The annual tournament determines the conference champion of the Division I Big 12 Conference for college baseball. The winner of the event earned the league's automatic bid to the 2013 NCAA Division I baseball tournament.

The tournament has been held since 1997, the inaugural year of the Big 12 Conference. Among current league members, Texas has won the most championships with four. TCU and West Virginia, new members of the league, are eligible for their first tournaments. Only Baylor and Kansas State have never won the event. Iowa State discontinued their program after the 2001 season without having won a title. Last year's champion, Missouri and three time champion Texas A&M departed the conference for the Southeastern Conference after the 2012 season.

Fourth-seeded Oklahoma defeated sixth-seeded Kansas in the championship game to claim their second Big 12 Baseball Conference Tournament title.

== Format and seeding ==
Due to the 2013 Moore tornado, just outside the Oklahoma City site of the Tournament, the Big 12 announced a delay in the start of the event and a change in format from the planned double-elimination tournament. Instead, the eight teams were divided into two pools who would play a round-robin format. The winners of each pool would then play a single championship game.

Place	Seed	Team	Conference				Overall		
Place	Seed	Team	W	L	%	GB	W	L	%
1	1	Kansas State	16	8	.667	–	45	19	.703
2	2	Oklahoma State	13	10	.565	2.5	41	19	.683
3	3	West Virginia	13	11	.542	3	33	26	.559
3	4	Oklahoma	13	11	.542	3	43	21	.672
5	5	Baylor	12	11	.522	3.5	27	28	.491
6	6	Kansas	12	12	.500	4	34	25	.576
6	7	TCU	12	12	.500	4	29	28	.509
8	8	Texas Tech	9	15	.375	7	26	30	.464
9	–	Texas	7	17	.292	9	27	24	.529

== Results ==
	Division A	KSU	OU	BU	TTU	Overall
1	Kansas State		L 6–7	W 13–9	W 4–3	2–1
4	Oklahoma	W 7–6		W 2–0	W 8–0	3–0
5	Baylor	L 9–13	L 0–2		L 2–8	0–3
8	Texas Tech	L 3–4	L 0–8	W 8–2		1–2

	Division B	OSU	WVU	KU	TCU	Overall
2	Oklahoma State		L 5–6	L 3–5	L 4–8	0–3
3	West Virginia	W 6–5		L 2–7	W 10–3	2–1
6	Kansas	W 5–3	W 7–2		W 4–0	3–0
7	TCU	W 8–4	L 3–10	L 0–4		1–2

Finals
A	Oklahoma	7
B	Kansas	2

== All-Tournament Team ==
Position	Player	School
1B	Matt Oberste	Oklahoma
2B	Hector Lorenzana	Oklahoma
3B	Garrett Carey	Oklahoma
SS	Kevin Kuntz	Kansas
C	Anthony Hermelyn	Oklahoma
OF	Michael Suiter	Kansas
OF	Max White	Oklahoma
OF	Jacob Rice	West Virginia
DH	Connor McKay	Kansas
RP	Jordan Piche'	Kansas
SP	Jon Gray	Oklahoma
RP	Trevor Seidenberger	TCU

=== Most Outstanding Player ===
- Jon Gray
