= GoMart Ballpark =

Baseball stadium in Charleston, West Virginia, US

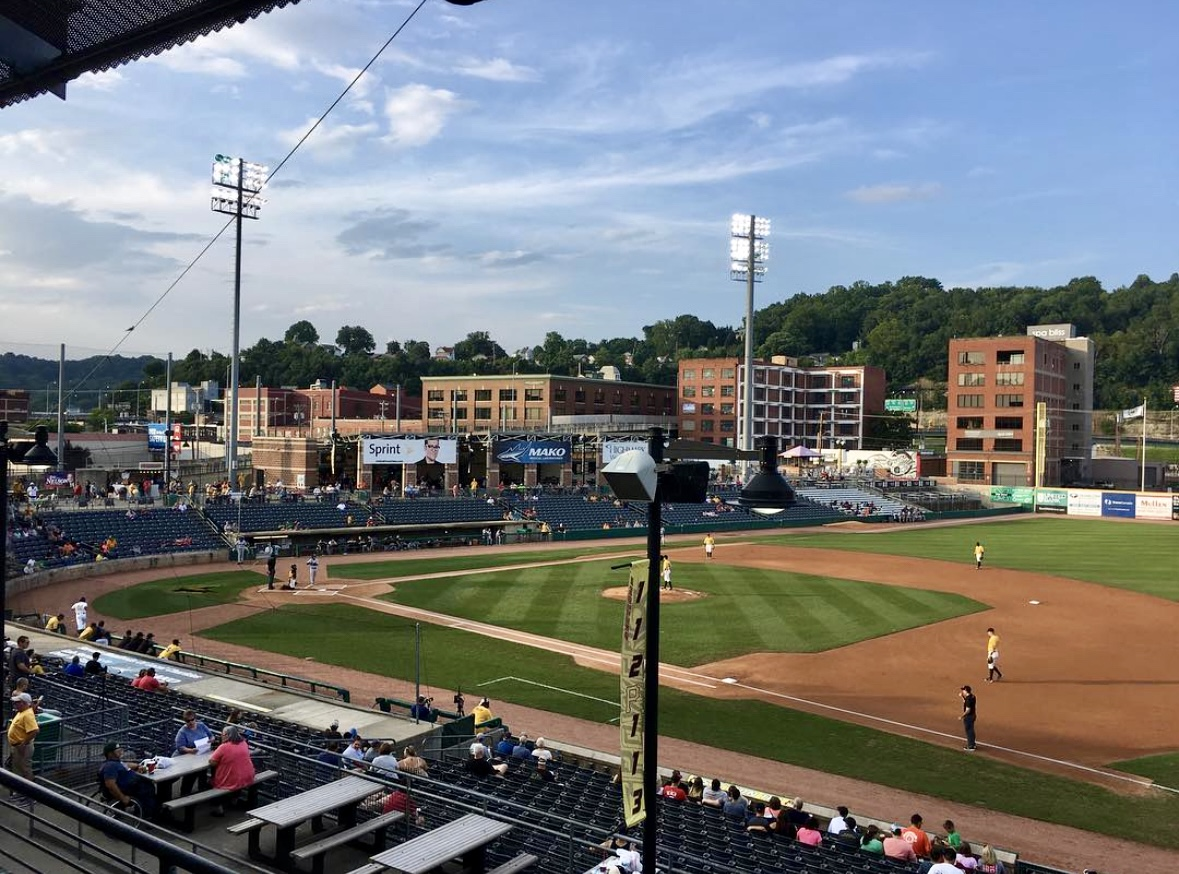
- GoMart Ballpark

- Location within West Virginia Location within the United States
- Interactive map of GoMart Ballpark
- Former names: Appalachian Power Park (2005–2022)
- Address: 601 Morris Street; Charleston, West Virginia 25301
- Coordinates: 38°20′56.5″N 81°37′30.4″W
- Owner: City of Charleston
- Operator: Palisades Baseball
- Capacity: 4,500
- Executive suites: 14 luxury seating boxes
- Surface: Grass (2005–2022); FieldTurf (2023–present)
- Record attendance: 10,103 vs Lexington Legends (June 9, 2005)
- Field size: Left Field: 330 ft (101 m); Center Field: 400 ft (122 m); Right Field: 320 ft (98 m)

Construction
- Groundbreaking: March 18, 2004
- Opened: April 14, 2005 vs Hagerstown Suns
- Cost: $25 million ($41.2 million in 2025 dollars)
- Architect: HNTB
- Services engineers: Henderson Engineers, Inc.
- General contractors: BBL Carlton, LLC

Tenants
- Charleston Dirty Birds (SAL/ALPB) 2005–present; Charleston Golden Eagles (NCAA) 2005–2019; Marshall Thundering Herd (NCAA) 2006–2018, 2023; WVSSAC State Baseball Championship 2005–2025; MEC Baseball Tournament (NCAA) 2023–2027

GoMart Ballpark is the current home field for the Charleston Dirty Birds, a baseball team in the Atlantic League of Professional Baseball. The stadium, which opened in April 2005, is located in the East End of Charleston, West Virginia. It seats 4,500 fans and cost $25 million to build. The dimensions of the field are as follows: left field – 330 feet, center field – 400 feet, right field – 320 feet.

== History ==
In an effort to preserve professional baseball in Charleston, plans were set in motion in the early 2000s to construct a new stadium that would replace the aging Watt Powell Park. On March 18, 2004, ground was broken on a new downtown ballpark located on Charleston's East End, marking a new chapter for baseball in the city after 56 years at Watt Powell Park in Kanawha City.

Watt Powell Park, though rich in history, was no longer viable under the financial and structural demands of modern Minor League Baseball. Several local and state groups worked to ensure baseball's continued presence in Charleston. Political support and collaboration with the West Virginia Economic Development Grant Committee played a critical role, while a community organization known as WVWINS mobilized residents and businesses to back the project. Shortly thereafter, Appalachian Power acquired the naming rights for the new $25 million stadium, which would become known as Appalachian Power Park.

The move to the new facility coincided with a rebranding of the city's baseball team. Charleston had fielded numerous professional clubs over the years under different names, including the Statesmen, Senators (1912–1961), Indians (1962–1964), and Charlies (1971–1983). After a brief absence from affiliated baseball, the city saw the return of the sport with the Charleston Wheelers (1987–1994) and later the Charleston Alley Cats (1995–2004), members of the South Atlantic League.

In 2005, the team debuted as the West Virginia Power, a name reflecting the state's diverse energy resources. The Power played their first game at Appalachian Power Park on April 14, 2005, defeating the Hagerstown Suns 8–3 before a crowd of 5,354 fans. The ballpark quickly became one of the more modern and popular facilities in Minor League Baseball at the time.

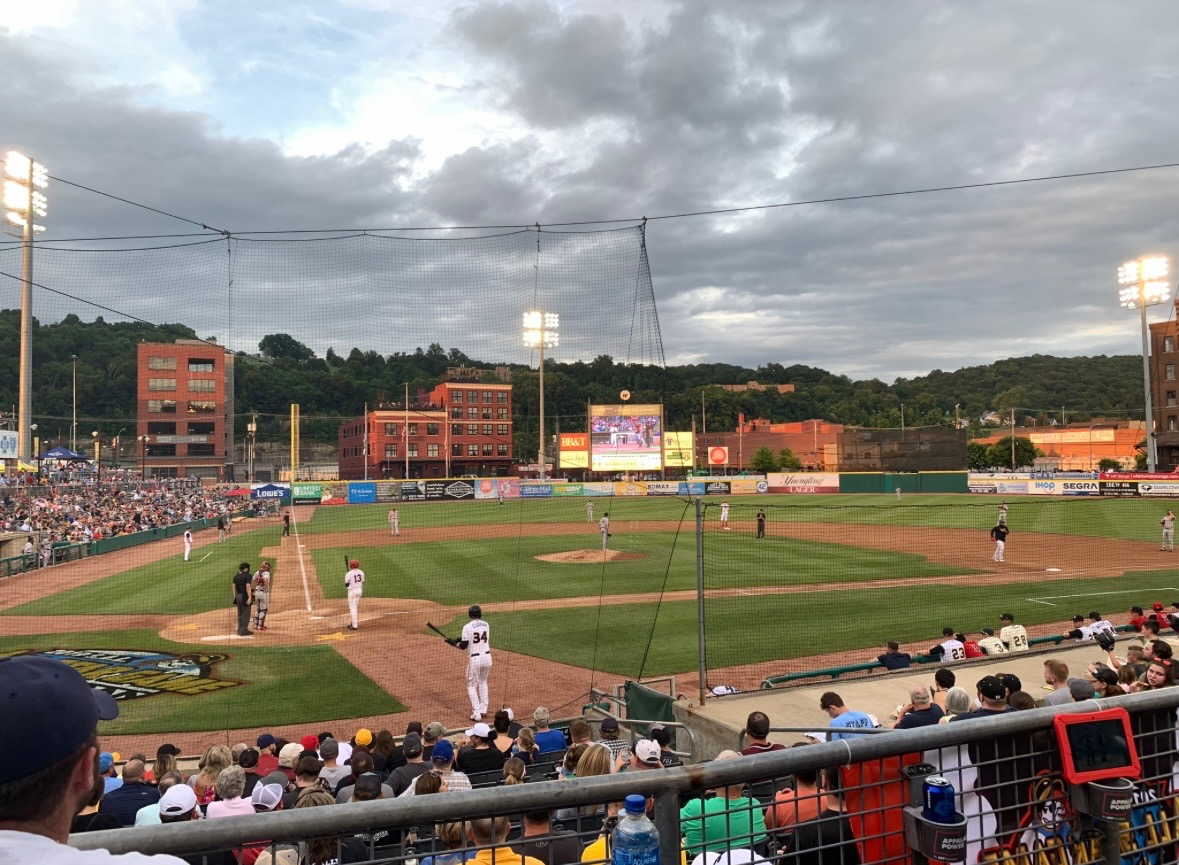
The 2019 South Atlantic League All-Star Game at GoMart Ballpark in Charleston, West Virginia

The ballpark gained further prominence when it hosted the 2009 South Atlantic League All-Star Game, branded the All-Star Jamboree. The event featured a range of festivities, including whitewater rafting and zip-lining excursions for players, a concert, guided coal mine tours, and a Home Run Derby competition, which was won by West Virginia Power slugger Calvin Anderson. The All-Star Game itself was played in front of a sellout crowd.

A decade later, the ballpark again served as the host site for the 2019 South Atlantic League All-Star Game, further solidifying its reputation as a premier minor league venue.

In November 2022, the stadium was renamed GoMart Ballpark after local convenience chain GoMart purchased the naming rights.

In April 2023, a capacity crowd of 5,500 filled GoMart Ballpark for a sold-out exhibition game between the Savannah Bananas and the Charleston Dirty Birds, held as part of the Bananas' nationwide Banana Ball tour.

== Top 10 highest-attended games at GoMart Ballpark ==
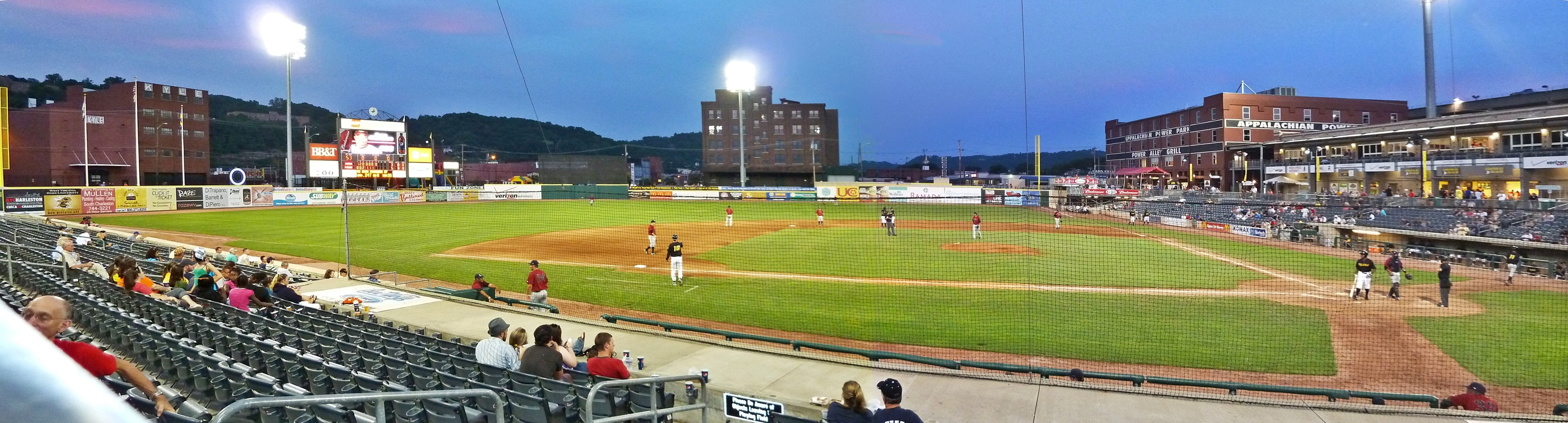
The view from Rowdy Alley, July 2010, vs. Lexington Legends

GoMart Ballpark, has hosted numerous high-attendance baseball games since opening in 2005. The following table lists the ten baseball games that drew the largest crowds in the ballpark's history.

Top 10 Highest-Attended Games at GoMart Ballpark
Rank	Date	Opponent	Attendance
1	June 9, 2005	Lexington Legends	10,103
2	April 30, 2025	#16 West Virginia University vs Marshall University	‡9,639
3	May 5, 2026	West Virginia University vs Marshall University	‡9,302
4	May 27, 2008	Lake County Captains	9,140
5	June 3, 2008	Lexington Legends	7,976
6	June 21, 2007	Kannapolis Intimidators	7,458
7	June 26, 2008	Lexington Legends	6,897
8	July 4, 2015	Delmarva Shorebirds	6,833
9	July 4, 2005	Lexington Legends	6,744
10	July 9, 2009	Delmarva Shorebirds	6,730

‡ College baseball contest

== High school and collegiate events ==
GoMart Ballpark has served as a frequent host of the WVSSAC West Virginia High School Baseball State Tournament. The Class A, AA, and AAA state semifinals and championship games were annually played at the stadium between 2005 and 2025, with an additional Class AAAA debuting in 2025.

From 2006 to 2018, it also served as the home field for the Marshall Thundering Herd's Conference USA games, as Marshall did not have an adequate baseball facility on its campus in Huntington, located approximately 50 miles (80 km) away.

The ballpark hosts an annual neutral-site college baseball rivalry game between West Virginia University and Marshall University. The matchup consistently draws strong attendance from fans of both schools and is considered a highlight of the college baseball season in West Virginia.

- The WVIAC Baseball Tournament was held at GoMart Ballpark on multiple occasions prior to the league's disbandment in 2013.
- The Mountain East Conference Baseball Tournament has also been hosted at the ballpark, continuing the tradition of showcasing Division II postseason play in Charleston.
- The University of Charleston and West Virginia State have played regular-season and rivalry games at GoMart Ballpark, drawing strong local crowds due to the schools' close proximity and competitive history.

List of notable college baseball games at GoMart Ballpark
Date	Home team	Opponent	Score	Attendance
May 3, 2013	West Virginia Mountaineers	#10 Oklahoma Sooners	3–4	3,279
April 18, 2017	Marshall Thundering Herd	#21 West Virginia Mountaineers	4–8	4,217
April 5, 2023	Marshall Thundering Herd	#24 West Virginia Mountaineers	9–15	5,047
March 12, 2024	West Virginia Mountaineers	Marshall Thundering Herd	11–2	5,084
April 30, 2025	Marshall Thundering Herd	#16 West Virginia Mountaineers	7–6	9,639
May 5, 2026	West Virginia Mountaineers	Marshall Thundering Herd	7–2	9,302

== Concerts and Events ==
In 2008, parts of The World's Strongest Man competition were held at the stadium.

TNA Wrestling held BaseBrawl Wrestling events at the stadium on September 8, 2012.

The stadium has also hosted concerts, boxing matches, charity events and shown television coverage of college football games on its scoreboard.

In December 2023, the Charleston Dirty Birds launched a holiday lights festival at GoMart Ballpark called Light the Night. The inaugural event drew a total of 8,614 visitors throughout the month, breaking several single-day attendance records at the ballpark during its first year.

The second annual Salango Law Light the Night in 2024 saw substantial expansion, including 500,000 additional lights—bringing the total to over 2 million—alongside new attractions such as a carousel, the Roundup, carnival rides, inflatables, and extended hours for the ice-skating rink.

GoMart Ballpark has hosted a variety of nationally and internationally recognized performers over the years. Notable concerts have included Def Leppard and Bryan Adams as part of the Rock 'N Roll Double-Header Tour, Randy Travis, Craig Morgan, Drive-By Truckers, and a multi-artist hip hop event in 2021 featuring Wiz Khalifa, Bone Thugs-n-Harmony, Chevy Woods, and Qwavais'e Sneed. The Davisson Brothers Band, based in West Virginia, has also played multiple shows at the venue.

== Stadium features ==
For the 2023 baseball season, the grass stadium surface was replaced with synthetic turf.

The ballpark features an authentic locomotive horn donated by Norfolk Southern Corporation, whose tracks run adjacent to the park, coincidentally continuing the atmosphere of predecessor Watt Powell Park. The horn was refurbished in 2005 by employees of Norfolk Southern's Juniata Locomotive Shop in Altoona, Pennsylvania, at the request of Assistant Division Superintendent Joe Maynard of Williamson.

One unique feature of the park is an electrical outlet located in the backstop behind home plate. This was added to accommodate local politician Rod Blackstone, nicknamed the "Toast Man," who has become one of the most famous fans in minor league baseball. Blackstone brings numerous signs to urge the team on, and regularly leads the crowd in family-friendly cheers. He is most famous for bringing bread and a toaster to games, which he had done for years for the Power's predecessors. When a Power pitcher strikes out a batter, he yells "You are toast!" and then tosses slices of fresh (and not-so-fresh) toast into the seats around him, following it up with a chant of "Don't eat the toast. You don't know where it's been."

The section behind the opposing team dugout is known as "Rowdy Alley" where Billy Bob and the Rowdys deliver family-friendly, good-natured heckles to the opposing team players and coaches as well to the umpires when they make bad calls. Billy Bob and Rowdy Alley are carryovers from Watt Powell Park and they have been razzing the opposing team since the early Charleston Alley Cats days. A night doesn't go by without hearing what can only be described as a Billy Bob Cackle when an opposing player strikes out. Choruses of "DIRT BALL!" and "BORING!" (sometimes in both English AND Spanish) pepper the opposing pitchers, and opposing coaches who dare venture onto the field are met with "LEFT-RIGHT-LEFT-RIGHT" all the way to the mound and back. The Rowdys are also known for their use of props to amuse the fans: duck-shaped umbrellas pop-up with loud calls of "DUCK!" when foul balls ricochet overhead, costume accessories, and noise-makers are abundant.

The stadium previously housed a seasonal and special events restaurant called the "Power Alley Bar and Grill" that featured food, indoor and outside seating, a full size bar, and pictures and memorabilia from Watt Powell Park and famous former players. In 2013, the restaurant was closed and reopened by a private vendor. The current restaurant is not sports-themed and does not have direct ties to the stadium.

In 2007, a party deck was built near the right field foul pole that can accommodate 250 people. An upgrade to a normal game ticket can be purchased for $25, allowing access to the Party Deck, which features all-you-can-eat hot dogs, nachos and other "baseball food," as well as unlimited drinks. Naming rights for the party deck were recently acquired by Anheuser-Busch. In the 2008 and 2009 seasons, this area was known as the "Landshark Lagoon" but has since been renamed the "Budweiser Party Deck."

Also in 2007, the Charleston Baseball Wall of Fame made its debut, located behind the home plate press box. "Wheeler" Bob (longtime Wheelers/Alley Cats/Power program and souvenir merchant), Rod "Toast Man" Blackstone, and Dave Parker are just three of the few who have had the honor of being inducted onto the Wall.

== Awards ==
In 2012, Stadium Journey Magazine named GoMart Ballpark among the ten best minor league baseball parks in the nation, and number 58 in its list of 100 best athletic venues worldwide.

== See also ==
- List of NCAA Division I baseball venues
