= Derek Matlock =

Head Coach of the Texas-Rio Grande Valley Vaqueros baseball team

Current position
- Title: Head coach
- Team: Texas–Rio Grande Valley
- Conference: Southland
- Record: 254–208

Biographical details
- Born: October 23, 1967 (age 59); Logan, Utah, U.S.
- Education: UT Arlington ('92)

Coaching career (HC unless noted)
- 1994–1995: Fort Worth (TX) Eastern Hills (asst)
- 1996–1999: Fort Worth (TX) Eastern Hills
- 1999–2004: Flower Mound (TX)
- 2005–2006: TCU (Volunteer asst)
- 2007–2012: Texas State (asst)
- 2013–2017: West Virginia (asst)
- 2018–present: Texas–Rio Grande Valley

Head coaching record
- Overall: 254–208
- Tournaments: NCAA: 0–0

Accomplishments and honors

Championships
- WAC Regular Season (2019); Southland Regular Season (2025)

Awards
- WAC Coach of the Year (2019)

Derek Matlock (born October 23, 1967) is an American college baseball coach and former pitcher. Matlock is the head coach of the Texas–Rio Grande Valley Vaqueros baseball team.

== Coaching career ==
Matlock began his coaching career as an assistant coach at Eastern Hills High School in Fort Worth, Texas. In 1996, Matlock became the head coach of Eastern Hills where he won multiple district championships and Coach-of-the-Year honors. In 1999, Matlock left Eastern Hills to start the Flower Mound High School program from scratch. On July 15, 2004, Matlock joined the TCU Horned Frogs baseball program as a volunteer assistant coach.

After two seasons at TCU, Matlock joined the Texas State program as the team's recruiting coordinator and pitching coach. While at Texas State, Matlock helped develop Paul Goldschmidt into an eighth-round draft pick.

On June 12, 2012, Matlock joined the West Virginia Mountaineers baseball staff as the team's recruiting coordinator and pitching coach.

On June 10, 2017, Matlock was introduced as the head coach of the Texas–Rio Grande Valley Vaqueros baseball team.

== Head coaching record ==
Record table
Season	Team	Overall	Conference	Standing	Postseason
Texas–Rio Grande Valley Vaqueros (Western Athletic Conference) (2018–2024)
2018	Texas–Rio Grande Valley	23–31	8–16	7th	
2019	Texas–Rio Grande Valley	34–21	19–8	T-1st	WAC Tournament
2020	Texas–Rio Grande Valley	11–7	0–0		Season canceled due to COVID-19
2021	Texas–Rio Grande Valley	32–26	20–15	5th	WAC Tournament
2022	Texas–Rio Grande Valley	33–25	17–13	3rd (Southwest)	
2023	Texas–Rio Grande Valley	30–26	15–14	7th	
2024	Texas–Rio Grande Valley	29–25	15–15	7th	WAC Tournament
Texas–Rio Grande Valley:			94–81		
Texas–Rio Grande Valley Vaqueros (Southland Conference) (2025–present)
2025	Texas–Rio Grande Valley	36–18	22–8	T–1st	Southland Tournament
2026	Texas–Rio Grande Valley	26–29	17–13	3rd	Southland Tournament
Texas–Rio Grande Valley:		254–208	39–21		
Total:		254–208			
National champion Postseason invitational champion Conference regular season champion Conference regular season and conference tournament champion Division regular season champion Division regular season and conference tournament champion Conference tournament champion

== See also ==
- List of current NCAA Division I baseball coaches
