= Florida State Seminoles baseball =

Florida State University baseball team

- Founded: 1948; 78 years ago
- Overall record: 3,160–1,245–10 (.717)
- University: Florida State University
- Head coach: Link Jarrett (5th season)
- Conference: ACC; Atlantic Division
- Location: Tallahassee, Florida
- Home stadium: Dick Howser Stadium (capacity: 6,750)
- Nickname: Seminoles
- Colors: Garnet and gold

College World Series runner-up
- 1970, 1986, 1999

College World Series appearances
- 1957, 1962, 1963, 1965, 1970, 1975, 1980, 1986, 1987, 1989, 1991, 1992, 1994, 1995, 1996, 1998, 1999, 2000, 2008, 2010, 2012, 2017, 2019, 2024

NCAA regional champions
- 1975, 1980, 1986, 1987, 1989, 1991, 1992, 1994, 1995, 1996, 1998, 1999, 2000, 2001, 2002, 2003, 2004, 2005, 2008, 2009, 2010, 2011, 2012, 2013, 2015, 2016, 2017, 2019, 2024, 2025

NCAA tournament appearances
- 1956, 1957, 1958, 1959, 1961, 1962, 1963, 1965, 1966, 1967, 1968, 1970, 1972, 1975, 1976, 1978, 1979, 1980, 1981, 1982, 1983, 1984, 1985, 1986, 1987, 1988, 1989, 1990, 1991, 1992, 1993, 1994, 1995, 1996, 1997, 1998, 1999, 2000, 2001, 2002, 2003, 2004, 2005, 2006, 2007, 2008, 2009, 2010, 2011, 2012, 2013, 2014, 2015, 2016, 2017, 2018, 2019, 2021, 2022, 2024, 2025, 2026

Conference tournament champions
- Metro; 1977, 1980, 1981, 1983, 1984, 1985, 1986, 1987, 1988, 1989, 1990, 1991 ACC; 1995, 1997, 2002, 2004, 2010, 2015, 2017, 2018

Conference regular season champions
- Dixie; 1950 Florida Intercollegiate; 1956, 1957 Metro; 1986, 1989, 1990, 1991 ACC; 1996, 1998, 1999, 2001, 2002, 2003, 2007, 2009, 2012

Conference division regular season champions
- ACC Atlantic; 2007, 2008, 2009, 2010, 2011, 2012, 2013, 2014

The Florida State Seminoles baseball is the team represents Florida State University (variously known as Florida State or just FSU) in the sport of college baseball. Florida State competes in NCAA Division I, and currently in the Atlantic Division of the Atlantic Coast Conference (ACC).

The Seminoles are the second most successful NCAA Division I college baseball program in percentage of games won, with an all-time win percentage of .717, second behind the Texas Longhorns. The Seminoles rank fifth in all-time wins and second in post-season wins. The Seminoles have appeared in the NCAA Tournament 62 times, advancing to the College World Series (CWS) 24 times, and have appeared in the CWS Championship Game or Championship Series on three occasions (in 1970, 1986, and 1999), finishing as runner-up. Florida State has won 11 regular-season conference championships and 20 conference tournament championships, including nine regular-season ACC championships and eight ACC tournament championships as well as eight division titles.

Florida State has had over 100 All-Americans and more than 300 players drafted into the MLB. Four Seminoles have won the Golden Spikes Award. Notable alumni include J.D. Drew, Terry Kennedy, Buster Posey, Dick Howser, and Mike Martin; the Buster Posey National Collegiate Catcher of the Year Award, presented annually to the top catcher in college baseball, is named for Florida State hall of famer, Posey, the Dick Howser Trophy, which has been awarded to a Florida State player on three occasions, is named after the team's former head coach, and Martin, a former player and head coach, is the winningest coach in the history of college baseball and has been elected into the College Baseball Hall of Fame.

The Seminoles play their home games on campus at Mike Martin Field at Dick Howser Stadium on the university's Tallahassee, Florida, campus and are coached by alumnus Link Jarrett.

== Program history ==
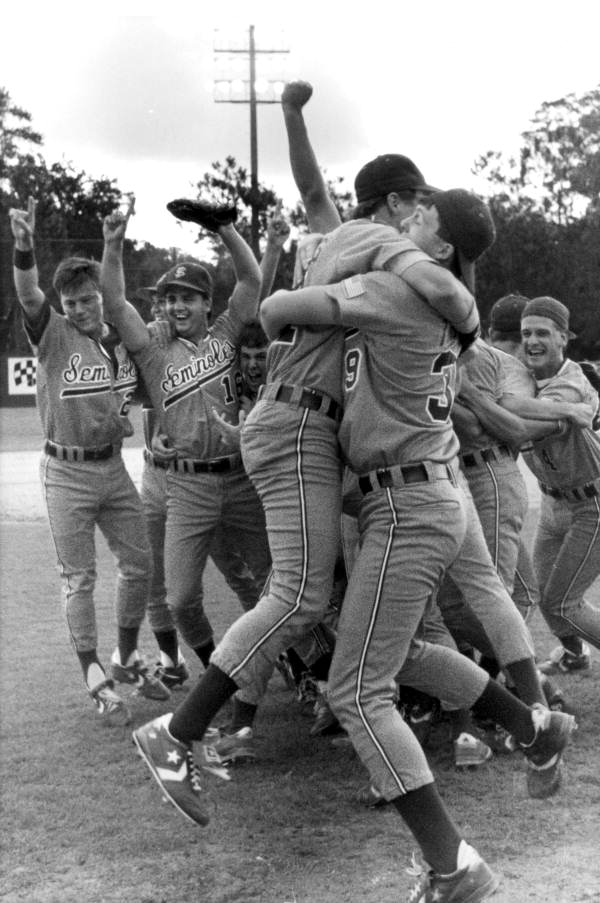
FSU has fielded a baseball team since 1948.

Seminole baseball is one of the most successful collegiate baseball programs in the United States having been to 24 College World Series in 62 Tournament appearances, and having appeared in the national championship final on three occasions (falling to the USC Trojans in 1970, the Arizona Wildcats in 1986, and the Miami Hurricanes in 1999).

Since 1990, FSU has had more 50 win seasons, hosted more NCAA Tournaments, and finished in the top 10 more than any team in the nation. Since 2000, FSU has been one of the best programs in college baseball with more victories and a higher winning percentage in the regular season than any other school. FSU made the postseason 44 years in a row, tied for the longest streak in the history of college baseball. FSU also has two 60 win seasons and twenty-four 50 win seasons. FSU has hosted more Super Regional Tournaments than any team in the nation. In 2012, FSU passed Texas for the most all-time wins in regionals and super regionals. In 2014, FSU set the record for the most National Seed selections of all-time. In 2017, FSU defeated Cal-State Fullerton, in the 1,000th College World Series game. From 1948-2022, FSU completed seventy-five consecutive winning seasons, the longest streak in the sport’s history, and was the only college baseball team to have never had a losing record until the 2023 season.

=== Early history (1948–1978) ===
The first coach of the Florida State Seminoles was Charlie Armstrong, who spent four years with the program and compiled a record of 46–29.

Ralph Matherly became the second coach of the Seminoles. Matherly served as head coach for three years and compiled a record of 43–22–1.

Danny Litwhiler was named as the third coach at Florida State. Litwhiler spent nine years coaching the Seminoles and compiled a record of 189–83. He is the second longest tenured coach in the history of the Florida State program.

The fourth coach of Florida State was Fred Hatfield. Hatfield was coach of the Seminoles for five years, and he compiled a record of 157–57–1.

Jack Stallings spent six years as head coach at Florida State. Stallings compiled a record of 248–107–3, making him the second winningest coach at the school.

As the sixth coach of the Seminoles, Woody Woodward led Florida State to an overall record 174–57 in his four years spent as head coach.

=== Dick Howser era (1979) ===
Dick Howser returned to his alma mater to serve as head coach of the Florida State Seminoles for one year and guided the team to a 43–17–1 record. Howser then returned to Major League Baseball as manager of the New York Yankees, leading them to the 1980 ALCS.

=== Mike Martin, Sr. era (1980–2019) ===
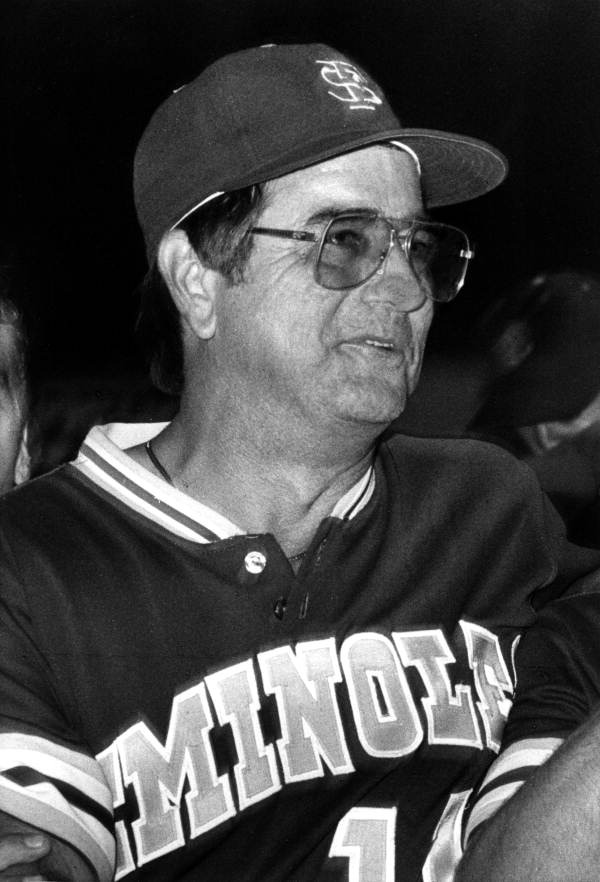
Mike Martin is the winningest coach in school history.

Mike Martin was the coach of the Seminoles for 40 years after serving as an assistant for five years. He is the winningest coach in school history and his teams never won less than 40 games a season and reached the postseason in every year of his tenure, advancing to the world series on 17 occasions; in 2017, Martin won his 1900th game, becoming just the second coach in college baseball history to reach that milestone, in 2018, he become the winningest coach in college baseball, and in his final season, he became the first coach in history to win 2,000 games. During his tenure, he had 85 players drafted in the first ten rounds of the MLB draft including 19 first round picks.

=== Mike Martin, Jr. era (2020–2022) ===
On June 21, 2019, Martin's son, Mike, Jr., a former player and assistant, was named head coach of the Seminoles. He guided Florida State to two appearances in the NCAA tournament during his tenure although the Seminoles were eliminated in the regionals on both occasions. On June 10, 2022, Martin was let go following three seasons, ending forty-three years of a Martin at the helm of the program.

=== Link Jarrett era (2023–present) ===
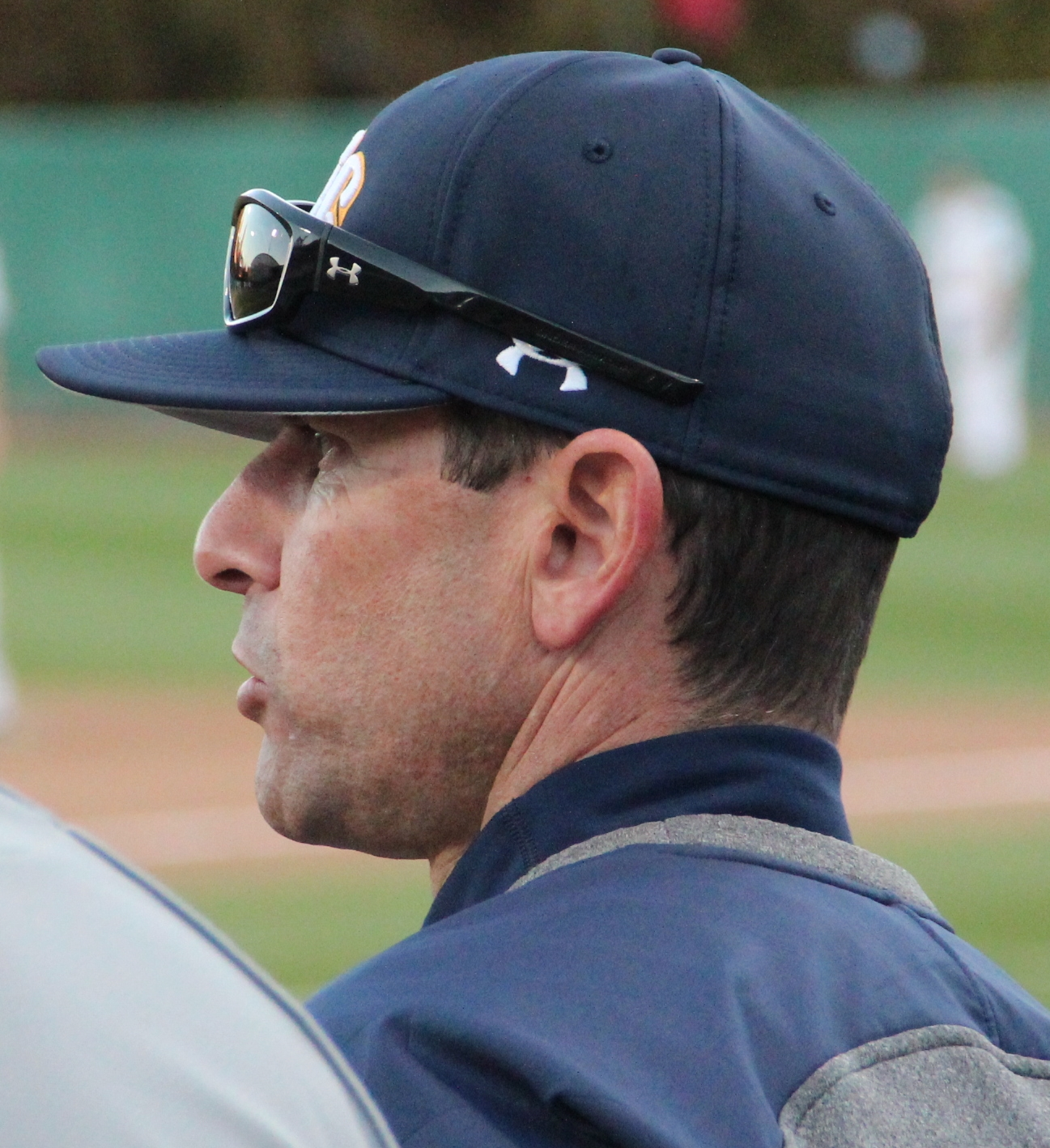
Jarrett played shortstop for the Seminoles from 1991–1994.

On June 24, 2022, Notre Dame head coach Link Jarrett, a former player under Martin Sr., was named head coach of the Seminoles. In his first season, the Seminoles suffered their first losing season in program history and missed the NCAA tournament for the first time since 1977. In his second year, he led the Seminoles to their second best start to a season in school history and a return to the tournament, with the Seminoles setting records in a super regional game for runs scored and margin of victory and advancing to their first world series appearance in five years, becoming the second Florida State head coach to both play and coach for the team in the college world series. Prior to the start of his fourth season, Jarrett signed a new contract with the school, ensuring his continuance as head coach of the program.

== Venue ==
=== Mike Martin Field at Dick Howser Stadium ===
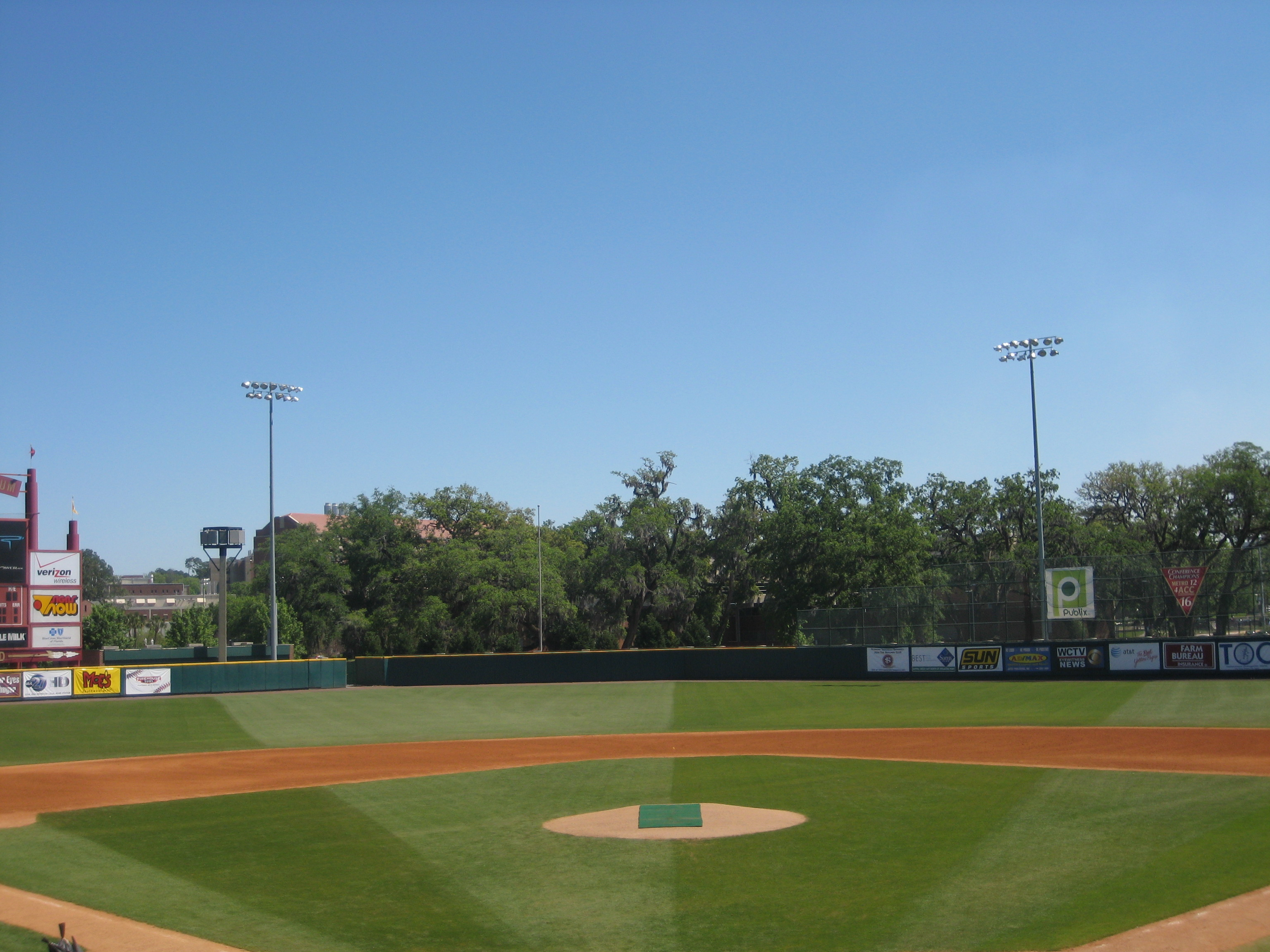
The field is named after former head coach Mike Martin.

Mike Martin Field at Dick Howser Stadium is the home of the Seminoles and is located in Tallahassee, Florida, on the campus of Florida State University. It is primarily used for baseball, and is the home field of the Florida State Seminoles baseball team.

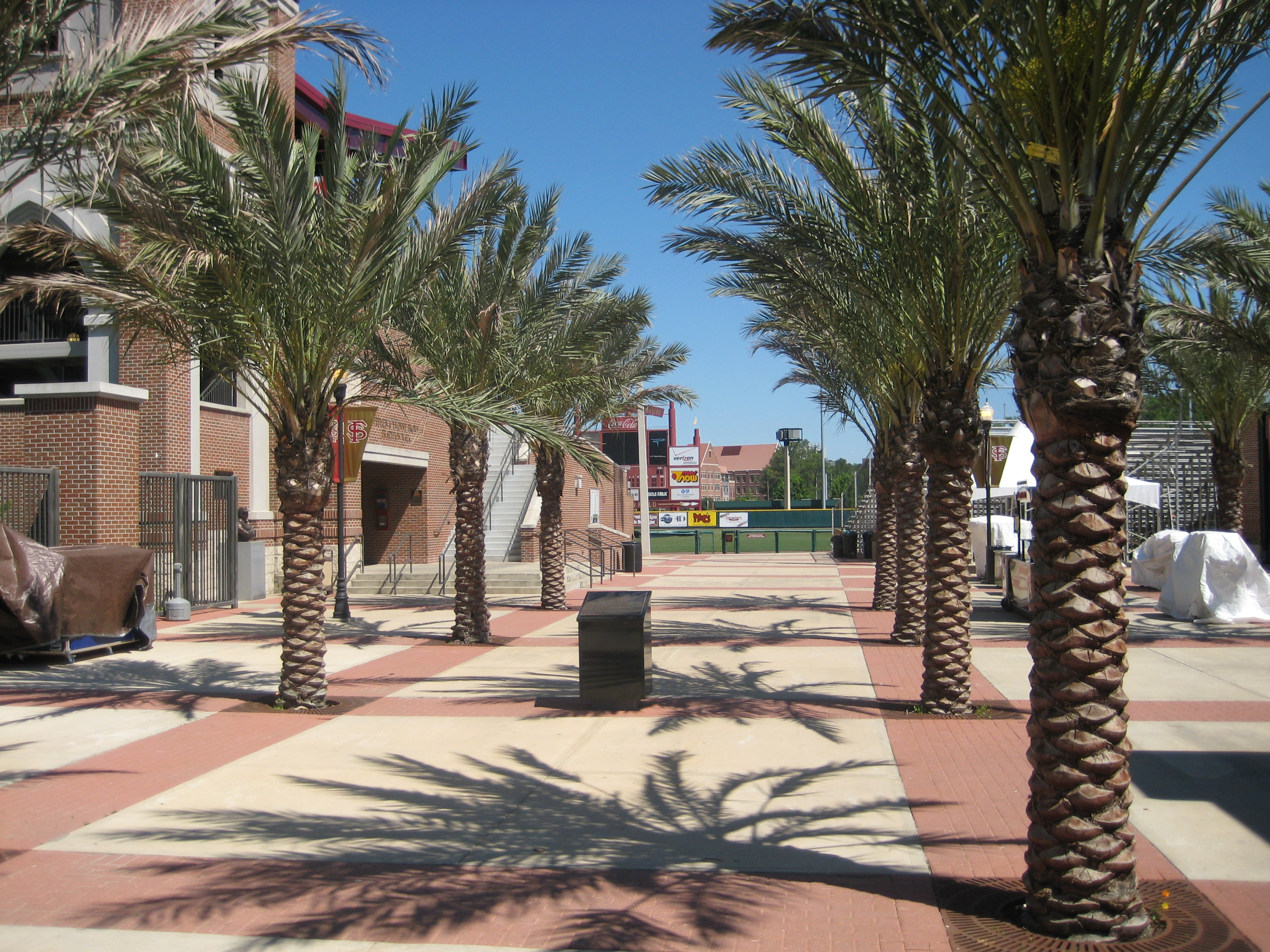
The stadium is named after former player and head coach Dick Howser.

It opened in 1983 and was renovated in 2004, upgrading the stadium to a 6,700 capacity level to make it one of the top collegiate baseball facilities in the United States. FSU's record crowd of 6,789 was set on April 19, 2008 with a defeat of the then #1 Miami Hurricanes by a score of 9–5.

== Head coaches ==
- Records are through the 2026 season

| Tenure | Coach | Years | Record | Pct. |
|---|---|---|---|---|
| 1948–1951 | Charlie Armstrong | 4 | 46–29 | .613 |
| 1952–1954 | Ralph Matherly | 3 | 43–22–1 | .659 |
| 1955–1963 | Danny Litwhiler | 9 | 190–83–1 | .695 |
| 1964–1968 | Fred Hatfield | 5 | 159–57–1 | .756 |
| 1969–1974 | Jack Stallings | 6 | 249–106–2 | .700 |
| 1975–1978 | Woody Woodward | 4 | 170–57 | .749 |
| 1979 | Dick Howser | 1 | 43–17–1 | .713 |
| 1980–2019 | Mike Martin | 40 | 2,029–736–4^{^} | .733 |
| 2020–2022 | Mike Martin, Jr. | 3 | 77–54 | .588 |
| 2023–present | Link Jarrett | 4 | 154–83 | .650 |
| Totals | 9 coaches | 79 seasons | 3,160–1,245–10 | .717 |

*^{^}4 wins were vacated due to the academic scandal in 2007.

=== Current coaching staff ===
- Head coach: Link Jarrett
- Assistant coach: Brad Vanderglas
- Pitching coach: Micah Posey
- Hitting coach/Recruiting coordinator: Ty Megahee
- Director of operations: Drew Linder

== Traditions ==
=== Animals of Section B ===
Before the home half of the 5th inning, a group of fans known as The Animals of Section B lead the Seminoles crowd in singing the Canadian national anthem, O Canada. This tradition is claimed to have started on February 13, 1988, during the 1988 Winter Olympics in Calgary, when FSU was playing Grambling State University. During the bottom of the 5th inning, with the score tied 2–2, a member of The Animals began humming the Canadian anthem. As the Seminoles began to rally for more and more runs, more Animals joined in the humming and the team scored eight runs that inning. With baseball being a sport with a long history of superstition, The Animals have maintained the tradition ever since.

=== Sunday Golds ===
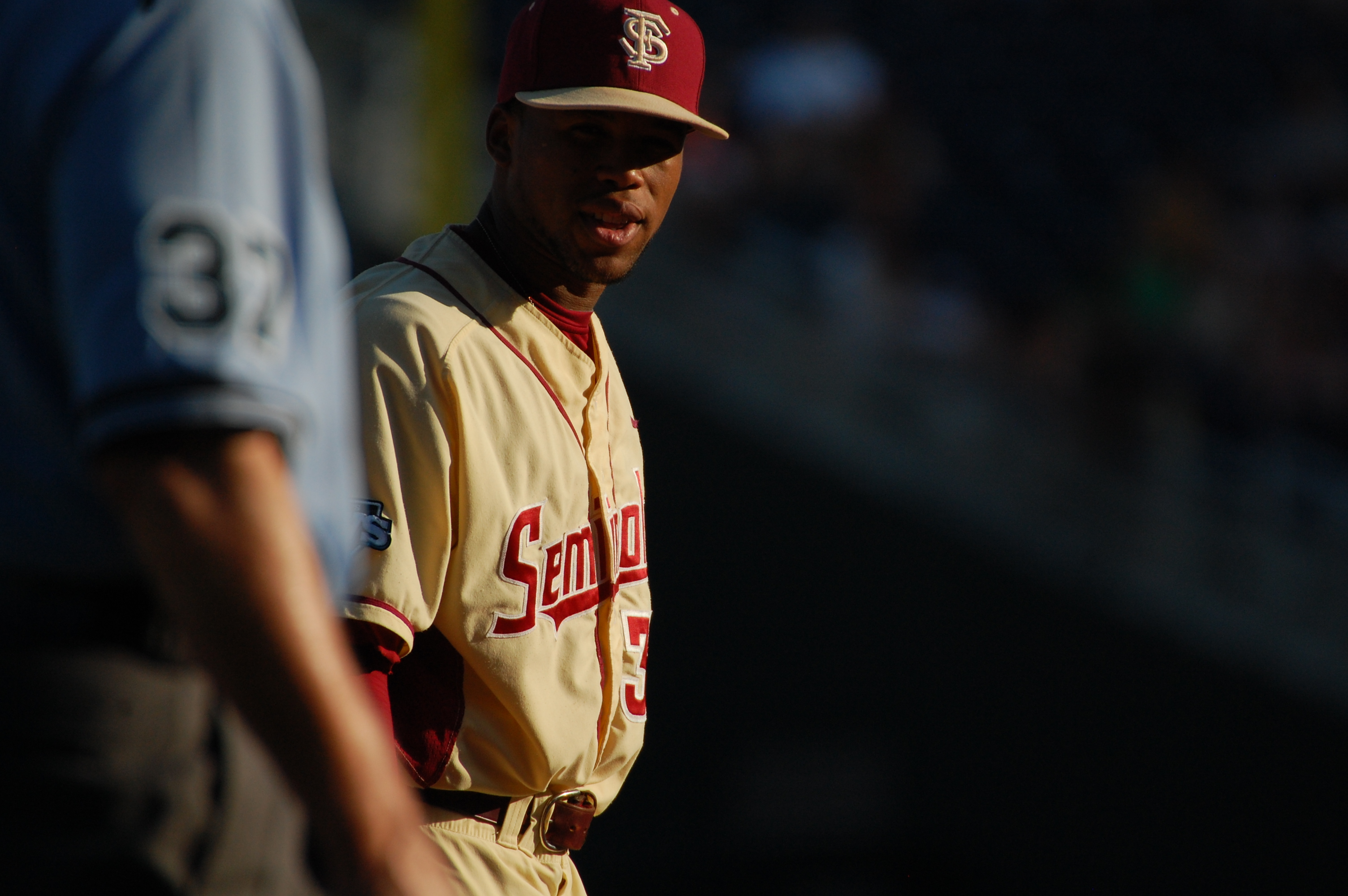
Florida State players wear gold uniforms in games that are played on Sundays.

A tradition that began during the Mike Martin era, the Seminoles wear their gold uniforms for every game that they play on a Sunday.

== Records and results ==
=== Year-by-year results ===
| National champions | Conference champions | Division champions |

Note: W = Wins, L = Losses, T = Ties, C = Conference

| Season | Coach | Conference | W | L | T | CW | CL | CT | Post Season |
|---|---|---|---|---|---|---|---|---|---|
| 1948 | Charlie Armstrong | Independent | 9 | 8 | 0 | | | | |
| 1949 | Charlie Armstrong | Dixie | 11 | 8 | 0 | 9 | 4 | 0 | |
| 1950 | Charlie Armstrong | Dixie | 13 | 7 | 0 | 6 | 2 | 0 | |
| 1951 | Charlie Armstrong | Dixie | 13 | 6 | 0 | 6 | 1 | 0 | |
| 1952 | Ralph Matherly | Independent | 17 | 4 | 0 | | | | |
| 1953 | Ralph Matherly | Independent | 13 | 10 | 1 | | | | |
| 1954 | Ralph Matherly | Independent | 13 | 8 | 0 | | | | |
| 1955 | Danny Litwhiler | Florida Intercollegiate | 17 | 6 | 1 | 7 | 3 | 0 | |
| 1956 | Danny Litwhiler | Florida Intercollegiate | 25 | 7 | 0 | 7 | 1 | 0 | NCAA tournament |
| 1957 | Danny Litwhiler | Florida Intercollegiate | 22 | 9 | 0 | 7 | 2 | 0 | College World Series |
| 1958 | Danny Litwhiler | Independent | 20 | 7 | 0 | | | | NCAA tournament |
| 1959 | Danny Litwhiler | Independent | 22 | 11 | 0 | | | | NCAA tournament |
| 1960 | Danny Litwhiler | Independent | 13 | 9 | 0 | | | | |
| 1961 | Danny Litwhiler | Independent | 21 | 7 | 0 | | | | NCAA tournament |
| 1962 | Danny Litwhiler | Independent | 23 | 14 | 0 | | | | College World Series |
| 1963 | Danny Litwhiler | Independent | 27 | 13 | 0 | | | | College World Series |
| 1964 | Fred Hatfield | Independent | 23 | 13 | 0 | | | | |
| 1965 | Fred Hatfield | Independent | 32 | 11 | 1 | | | | College World Series |
| 1966 | Fred Hatfield | Independent | 39 | 13 | 0 | | | | NCAA tournament |
| 1967 | Fred Hatfield | Independent | 30 | 14 | 0 | | | | NCAA tournament |
| 1968 | Fred Hatfield | Independent | 35 | 6 | 0 | | | | NCAA tournament |
| 1969 | Jack Stallings | Independent | 39 | 12 | 0 | | | | |
| 1970 | Jack Stallings | Independent | 49 | 9 | 1 | | | | College World Series |
| 1971 | Jack Stallings | Independent | 46 | 16 | 0 | | | | |
| 1972 | Jack Stallings | Independent | 45 | 23 | 0 | | | | NCAA tournament |
| 1973 | Jack Stallings | Independent | 38 | 21 | 0 | | | | |
| 1974 | Jack Stallings | Independent | 37 | 25 | 1 | | | | |
| 1975 | Woody Woodward | Independent | 49 | 10 | 0 | | | | College World Series |
| 1976 | Woody Woodward | Independent | 40 | 16 | 0 | | | | NCAA tournament |
| 1977 | Woody Woodward | Metro | 37 | 13 | 0 | 4 | 1 | 0 | |
| 1978 | Woody Woodward | Metro | 44 | 18 | 0 | 9 | 4 | 0 | NCAA tournament |
| 1979 | Dick Howser | Metro | 43 | 17 | 1 | 4 | 2 | 0 | NCAA tournament |
| 1980 | Mike Martin | Metro | 51 | 12 | 0 | 5 | 2 | 0 | College World Series |
| 1981 | Mike Martin | Metro | 56 | 23 | 0 | 9 | 4 | 0 | NCAA tournament |
| 1982 | Mike Martin | Metro | 56 | 17 | 1 | 9 | 6 | 0 | NCAA tournament |
| 1983 | Mike Martin | Metro | 55 | 18 | 1 | 10 | 4 | 0 | NCAA tournament |
| 1984 | Mike Martin | Metro | 55 | 29 | 0 | 15 | 3 | 0 | NCAA tournament |
| 1985 | Mike Martin | Metro | 59 | 23 | 0 | 17 | 6 | 0 | NCAA tournament |
| 1986 | Mike Martin | Metro | 61 | 13 | 0 | 13 | 3 | 0 | College World Series |
| 1987 | Mike Martin | Metro | 55 | 18 | 0 | 14 | 3 | 0 | College World Series |
| 1988 | Mike Martin | Metro | 50 | 18 | 1 | 11 | 6 | 0 | NCAA tournament |
| 1989 | Mike Martin | Metro | 54 | 18 | 0 | 14 | 4 | 0 | College World Series |
| 1990 | Mike Martin | Metro | 57 | 15 | 0 | 17 | 4 | 0 | NCAA tournament |
| 1991 | Mike Martin | Metro | 57 | 14 | 0 | 17 | 4 | 0 | College World Series |
| 1992 | Mike Martin | ACC | 49 | 21 | 0 | 16 | 7 | 0 | College World Series |
| 1993 | Mike Martin | ACC | 46 | 19 | 0 | 14 | 9 | 0 | NCAA tournament |
| 1994 | Mike Martin | ACC | 53 | 22 | 0 | 14 | 9 | 0 | College World Series |
| 1995 | Mike Martin | ACC | 53 | 16 | 0 | 16 | 7 | 0 | College World Series |
| 1996 | Mike Martin | ACC | 52 | 17 | 0 | 19 | 5 | 0 | College World Series |
| 1997 | Mike Martin | ACC | 50 | 17 | 0 | 18 | 6 | 0 | NCAA tournament |
| 1998 | Mike Martin | ACC | 53 | 20 | 0 | 18 | 4 | 0 | College World Series |
| 1999 | Mike Martin | ACC | 57 | 14 | 0 | 22 | 2 | 0 | College World Series |
| 2000 | Mike Martin | ACC | 53 | 19 | 0 | 15 | 9 | 0 | College World Series |
| 2001 | Mike Martin | ACC | 47 | 19 | 0 | 20 | 4 | 0 | NCAA tournament |
| 2002 | Mike Martin | ACC | 60 | 14 | 0 | 18 | 6 | 0 | NCAA tournament |
| 2003 | Mike Martin | ACC | 54 | 13 | 1 | 19 | 5 | 0 | NCAA tournament |
| 2004 | Mike Martin | ACC | 45 | 23 | 0 | 16 | 8 | 0 | NCAA tournament |
| 2005 | Mike Martin | ACC | 53 | 20 | 0 | 19 | 11 | 0 | NCAA tournament |
| 2006 | Mike Martin | ACC | 44 | 21 | 0 | 16 | 13 | 0 | NCAA tournament |
| 2007 | Mike Martin | ACC | 45^{1} | 13 | 0 | 21^{2} | 6 | 0 | NCAA tournament |
| 2008 | Mike Martin | ACC | 54 | 14 | 0 | 24 | 6 | 0 | College World Series |
| 2009 | Mike Martin | ACC | 45 | 18 | 0 | 19 | 9 | 0 | NCAA tournament |
| 2010 | Mike Martin | ACC | 48 | 20 | 0 | 18 | 12 | 0 | College World Series |
| 2011 | Mike Martin | ACC | 46 | 19 | 0 | 19 | 11 | 0 | NCAA tournament |
| 2012 | Mike Martin | ACC | 50 | 17 | 0 | 24 | 6 | 0 | College World Series |
| 2013 | Mike Martin | ACC | 47 | 17 | 0 | 20 | 10 | 0 | NCAA tournament |
| 2014 | Mike Martin | ACC | 43 | 17 | 0 | 21 | 9 | 0 | NCAA tournament |
| 2015 | Mike Martin | ACC | 44 | 21 | 0 | 17 | 13 | 0 | NCAA tournament |
| 2016 | Mike Martin | ACC | 41 | 22 | 0 | 16 | 10 | 0 | NCAA tournament |
| 2017 | Mike Martin | ACC | 46 | 24 | 0 | 14 | 14 | 0 | College World Series |
| 2018 | Mike Martin | ACC | 43 | 19 | 0 | 16 | 13 | 0 | NCAA tournament |
| 2019 | Mike Martin | ACC | 42 | 23 | 0 | 17 | 13 | 0 | College World Series |
| 2020 | Mike Martin, Jr. | ACC | 12 | 5 | 0 | 1 | 2 | 0 | season canceled due to the COVID-19 pandemic |
| 2021 | Mike Martin, Jr. | ACC | 31 | 24 | 0 | 20 | 16 | 0 | NCAA tournament |
| 2022 | Mike Martin, Jr. | ACC | 34 | 25 | 0 | 15 | 15 | 0 | NCAA tournament |
| 2023 | Link Jarrett | ACC | 23 | 31 | 0 | 9 | 21 | 0 | |
| 2024 | Link Jarrett | ACC | 49 | 17 | 0 | 17 | 12 | 0 | College World Series |
| 2025 | Link Jarrett | ACC | 42 | 15 | 0 | 17 | 10 | 0 | NCAA tournament |
| 2026 | Link Jarrett | ACC | 40 | 19 | 0 | 19 | 11 | 0 | NCAA tournament |
| Total: | | | 3,160 | 1,245 | 10 | 813 | 393 | 0 | |
| Win Percentage: | | | .717 | | | .674 | | | |

*^{^}4 total wins vacated due to the academic scandal
*^{^}3 ACC wins vacated due to the academic scandal

=== Polls ===
Florida State been ranked in the Collegiate Baseball Division I Final Poll 57 times.

Top-10 finishes are colored ██

| Year | Record | Final Ranking |
|---|---|---|
| 1961 | 21–7 | 17 |
| 1962 | 23–14 | 4 |
| 1963 | 27–13 | 6 |
| 1965 | 32–11–1 | 5 |
| 1966 | 39–13 | 9 |
| 1967 | 30–14 | 13 |
| 1968 | 35–6 | 12 |
| 1969 | 39–12–1 | 10 |
| 1970 | 49–9–1 | 2 |
| 1971 | 41–16 | 23 |
| 1972 | 45–23 | 19 |
| 1973 | 38–21 | 24 |
| 1975 | 49–10 | 2 |
| 1976 | 40–16 | 14 |
| 1980 | 51–12 | 7 |

| Year | Record | Final Ranking |
|---|---|---|
| 1981 | 56–23 | 16 |
| 1982 | 56–17–1 | 22 |
| 1983 | 55–18–1 | 15 |
| 1985 | 59–23 | 20 |
| 1986 | 61–13 | 2 |
| 1987 | 55–18 | 6 |
| 1988 | 50–18–1 | 15 |
| 1989 | 54–18 | 3 |
| 1990 | 57–15 | 10 |
| 1991 | 57–14 | 7 |
| 1992 | 49–21 | 5 |
| 1993 | 46–19 | 22 |
| 1994 | 53–22 | 6 |
| 1995 | 53–16 | 5 |
| 1996 | 52–17 | 6 |

| Year | Record | Final Ranking |
|---|---|---|
| 1997 | 50–17 | 9 |
| 1998 | 53–20 | 8 |
| 1999 | 57–14 | 2 |
| 2000 | 53–19 | 3 |
| 2001 | 47–19 | 9 |
| 2002 | 60–14 | 9 |
| 2003 | 54–13–1 | 9 |
| 2004 | 45–23 | 14 |
| 2005 | 53–20 | 15 |
| 2006 | 44–21 | 24 |
| 2007 | 45–13 | 10 |
| 2008 | 54–14 | 7 |
| 2009 | 45–18 | 9 |
| 2010 | 48–20 | 6 |
| 2011 | 46–19 | 6 |

| Year | Record | Final Ranking |
|---|---|---|
| 2012 | 50–17 | 4 |
| 2013 | 47–17 | 13 |
| 2014 | 43–17 | 23 |
| 2015 | 44–21 | 12 |
| 2016 | 41–22 | 14 |
| 2017 | 46–23 | 6 |
| 2018 | 43–19 | 21 |
| 2019 | 42–23 | 6 |
| 2020 | 12–5 | 13 |
| 2024 | 49–17 | 3 |
| 2025 | 42–16 | 10 |
| 2026 | 40–19 | 18 |

=== All-time record vs. ACC teams ===
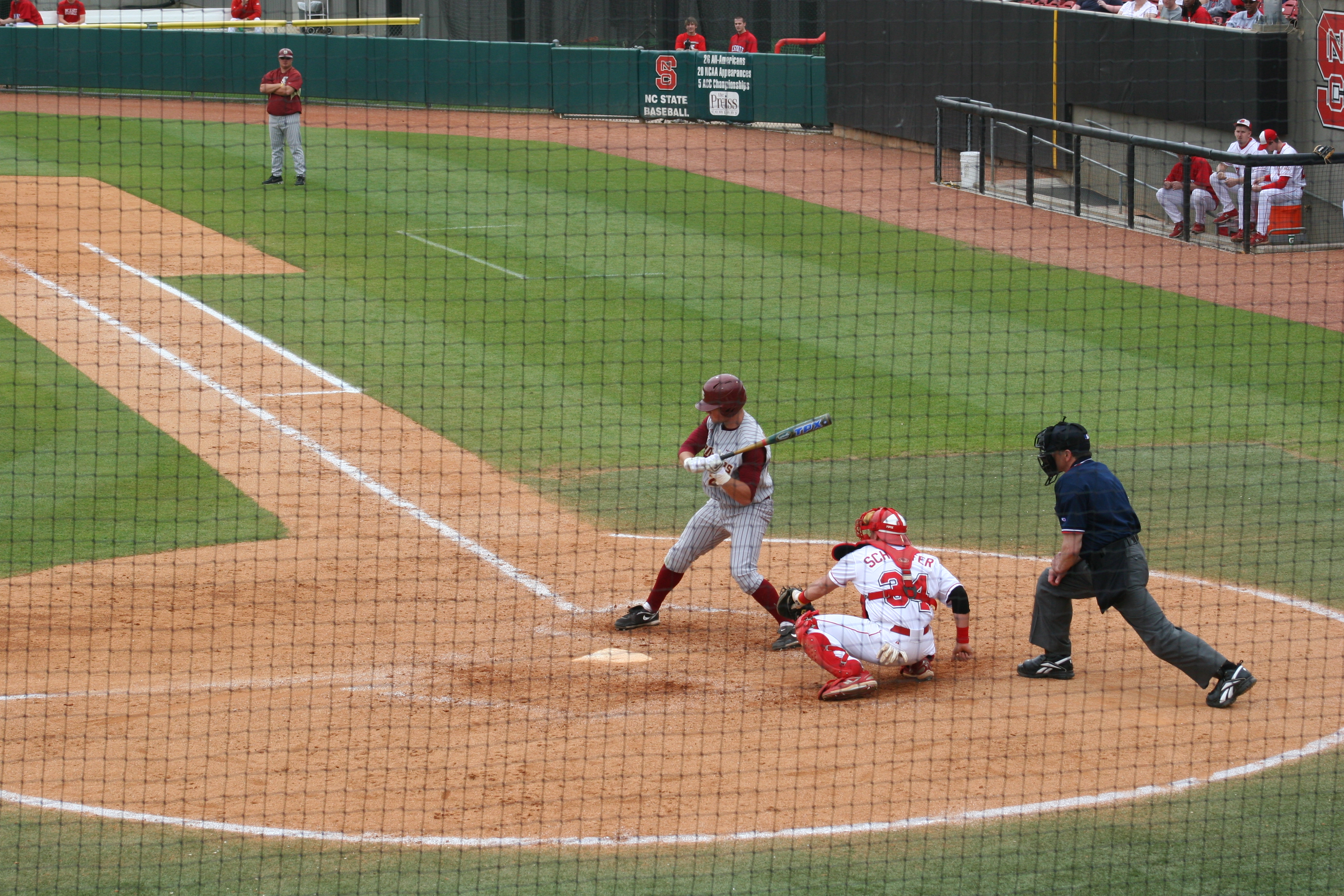
Florida State maintains a winning record against all current ACC baseball teams.

| Opponent | Won | Lost | Tie | Percentage | Streak | First Meeting |
|---|---|---|---|---|---|---|
| Boston College | 44^{^} | 12 | 0 | .786 | Won 4 | 2006 |
| California | 5 | 2 | 0 | .714 | Won 1 | 1992 |
| Clemson | 87 | 79 | 1 | .524 | Won 1 | 1958 |
| Duke | 85^{^} | 31 | 0 | .733 | Lost 1 | 1954 |
| Georgia Tech | 81 | 54 | 0 | .600 | Lost 3 | 1959 |
| Louisville | 38 | 14 | 0 | .731 | Lost 2 | 1977 |
| Miami | 166 | 138 | 4 | .545 | Lost 1 | 1951 |
| North Carolina | 75 | 37 | 0 | .670 | Lost 1 | 1956 |
| North Carolina State | 78 | 41 | 0 | .655 | Won 2 | 1962 |
| Notre Dame | 30 | 17 | 0 | .638 | Won 5 | 1956 |
| Pittsburgh | 32 | 9 | 0 | .780 | Lost 1 | 1983 |
| Stanford | 11 | 12 | 0 | .478 | Lost 3 | 1992 |
| Virginia | 64 | 35 | 0 | .646 | Won 2 | 1972 |
| Virginia Tech | 51^{^} | 18 | 0 | .739 | Won 4 | 1967 |
| Wake Forest | 101 | 40 | 0 | .716 | Won 3 | 1962 |
| Totals | 941 | 544 | 5 | .633 | | |

*^{^}3 ACC wins are vacated from 2007 due to the academic scandal

=== Rivalries ===
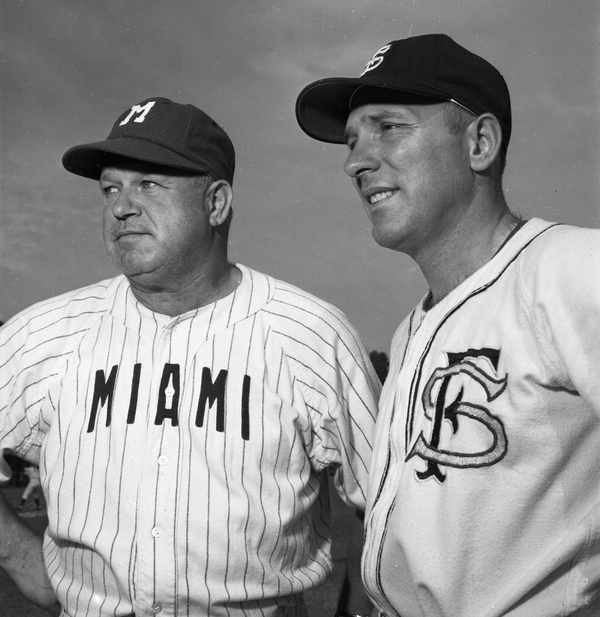
Florida State and Miami play a yearly series as conference opponents.

| Opponent | Won | Lost | Tie | Percentage | Streak | First Meeting |
|---|---|---|---|---|---|---|
| Florida | 135 | 132 | 1 | .506 | Lost 4 | 1956 |
| Jacksonville | 143 | 43 | 0 | .769 | Won 10 | 1960 |
| Miami | 166 | 138 | 4 | .545 | Lost 1 | 1951 |
| Totals | 444 | 313 | 5 | .586 | | |

=== Florida State in the NCAA Tournament ===
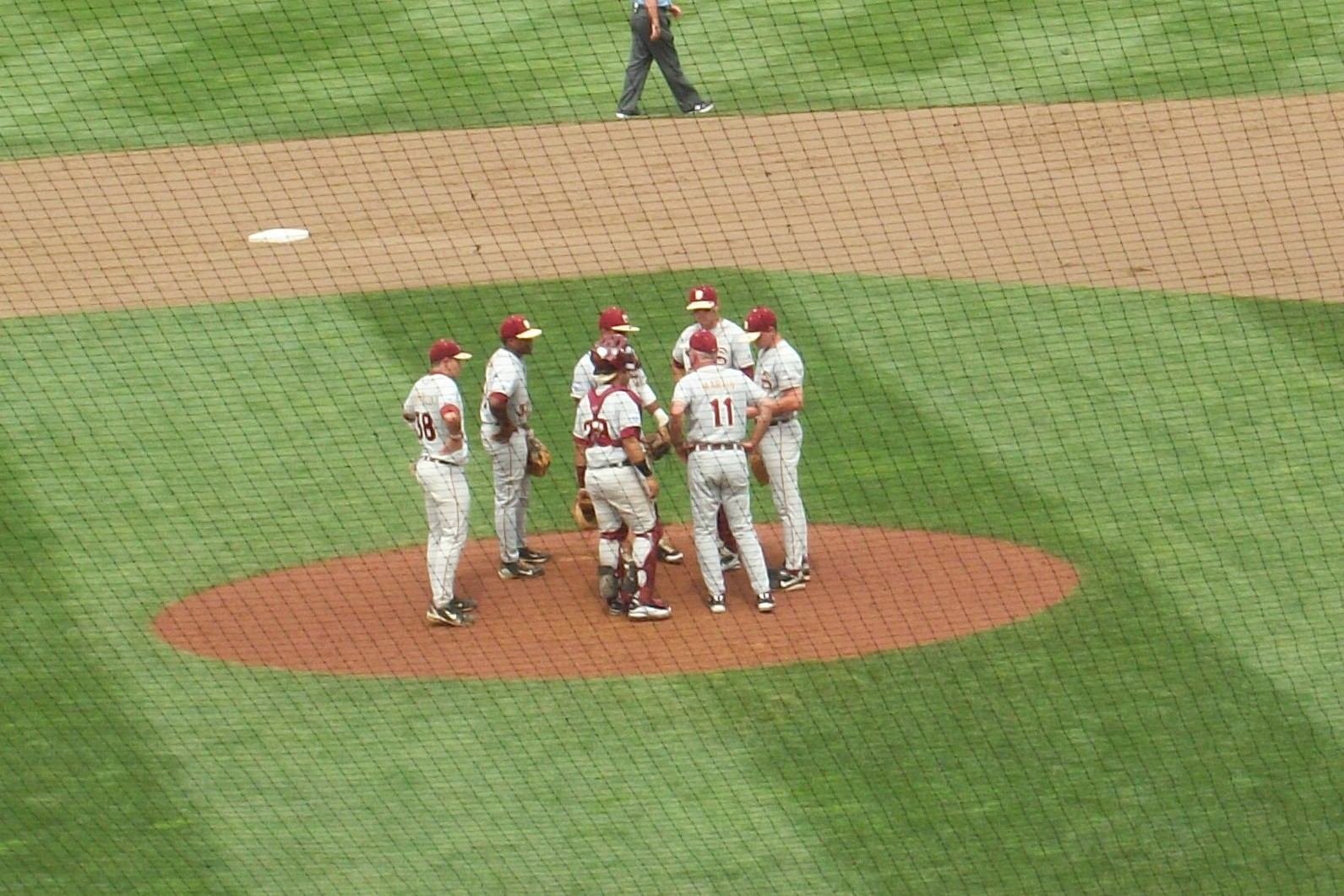
Florida State in the College World Series

Florida State has appeared in the NCAA tournament a total of 62 times (as of 2026), the second most appearances of any team in history. The Seminoles had 44 straight appearances from 1978 to 2022, tied for the longest streak in tournament history. The Seminoles have hosted regionals a nation-leading total of 38 times (as of 2026), including eight consecutive times from 2011–2018, have been selected as a top-eight national seed a total of 12 times (as of 2024), the most of any school, and have advanced to a super-regional a nation-leading total of 19 times (as of 2025), including six straight appearances from 2008–2013.

- The NCAA Division I baseball tournament started in 1947.
- The format of the tournament has changed through the years.

| National champions | Runner-up | College World Series | Super Regionals |

| Year | W | L | Percent |
|---|---|---|---|
| 1956 | 1 | 2 | .333 |
| 1957 | 3 | 3 | .500 |
| 1958 | 1 | 2 | .333 |
| 1959 | 2 | 2 | .500 |
| 1961 | 1 | 2 | .333 |
| 1962 | 6 | 3 | .667 |
| 1963 | 4 | 3 | .571 |
| 1965 | 5 | 3 | .625 |
| 1966 | 3 | 2 | .600 |
| 1967 | 1 | 2 | .333 |
| 1968 | 3 | 2 | .600 |
| 1970 | 7 | 2 | .778 |
| 1972 | 1 | 2 | .333 |
| 1975 | 3 | 2 | .600 |
| 1976 | 1 | 2 | .333 |
| 1978 | 0 | 2 | .000 |
| 1979 | 0 | 2 | .000 |
| 1980 | 3 | 2 | .600 |
| 1981 | 2 | 2 | .500 |
| 1982 | 1 | 2 | .333 |
| 1983 | 1 | 2 | .333 |
| 1984 | 0 | 2 | .000 |
| 1985 | 2 | 2 | .500 |
| 1986 | 7 | 2 | .778 |
| 1987 | 5 | 3 | .625 |
| 1988 | 2 | 2 | .500 |
| 1989 | 6 | 2 | .750 |
| 1990 | 4 | 2 | .667 |
| 1991 | 4 | 2 | .667 |
| 1992 | 6 | 3 | .667 |
| 1993 | 2 | 2 | .500 |
| 1994 | 5 | 2 | .714 |
| 1995 | 5 | 2 | .714 |
| 1996 | 5 | 2 | .714 |
| 1997 | 4 | 2 | .667 |
| 1998 | 4 | 2 | .667 |
| 1999 | 9 | 2 | .818 |
| 2000 | 8 | 4 | .667 |
| 2001 | 4 | 2 | .667 |
| 2002 | 4 | 2 | .667 |
| 2003 | 4 | 3 | .571 |
| 2004 | 3 | 3 | .500 |
| 2005 | 3 | 2 | .600 |
| 2006 | 2 | 2 | .500 |
| 2007 | 1 | 2 | .333 |
| 2008 | 6 | 4 | .600 |
| 2009 | 3 | 2 | .600 |
| 2010 | 6 | 3 | .667 |
| 2011 | 4 | 2 | .667 |
| 2012 | 7 | 2 | .778 |
| 2013 | 3 | 2 | .600 |
| 2014 | 0 | 2 | .000 |
| 2015 | 3 | 2 | .600 |
| 2016 | 4 | 2 | .667 |
| 2017 | 7 | 4 | .636 |
| 2018 | 0 | 2 | .000 |
| 2019 | 6 | 2 | .750 |
| 2021 | 1 | 2 | .333 |
| 2022 | 1 | 2 | .333 |
| 2024 | 7 | 2 | .778 |
| 2025 | 4 | 2 | .667 |
| 2026 | 2 | 2 | .500 |
| Total: | 212 | 138 | .606 |

==== College World Series ====
Florida State has made twenty-four appearances in the College World Series, compiling a 32–48 record and advancing to the title game on three occasions.

| Year | Place |
|---|---|
| 1957 | 8th |
| 1962 | 4th |
| 1963 | 5th |
| 1965 | 6th |
| 1970 | 2nd |
| 1975 | 7th |
| 1980 | 8th |
| 1986 | 2nd |
| 1987 | 5th |
| 1989 | 3rd |
| 1991 | 8th |
| 1992 | 6th |
| 1994 | 6th |
| 1995 | 6th |
| 1996 | 5th |
| 1998 | 8th |
| 1999 | 2nd |
| 2000 | 3rd |
| 2008 | 7th |
| 2010 | 5th |
| 2012 | 3rd |
| 2017 | 6th |
| 2019 | 5th |
| 2024 | 4th |
| 24 | 32–48 (.400) |

== Championships ==
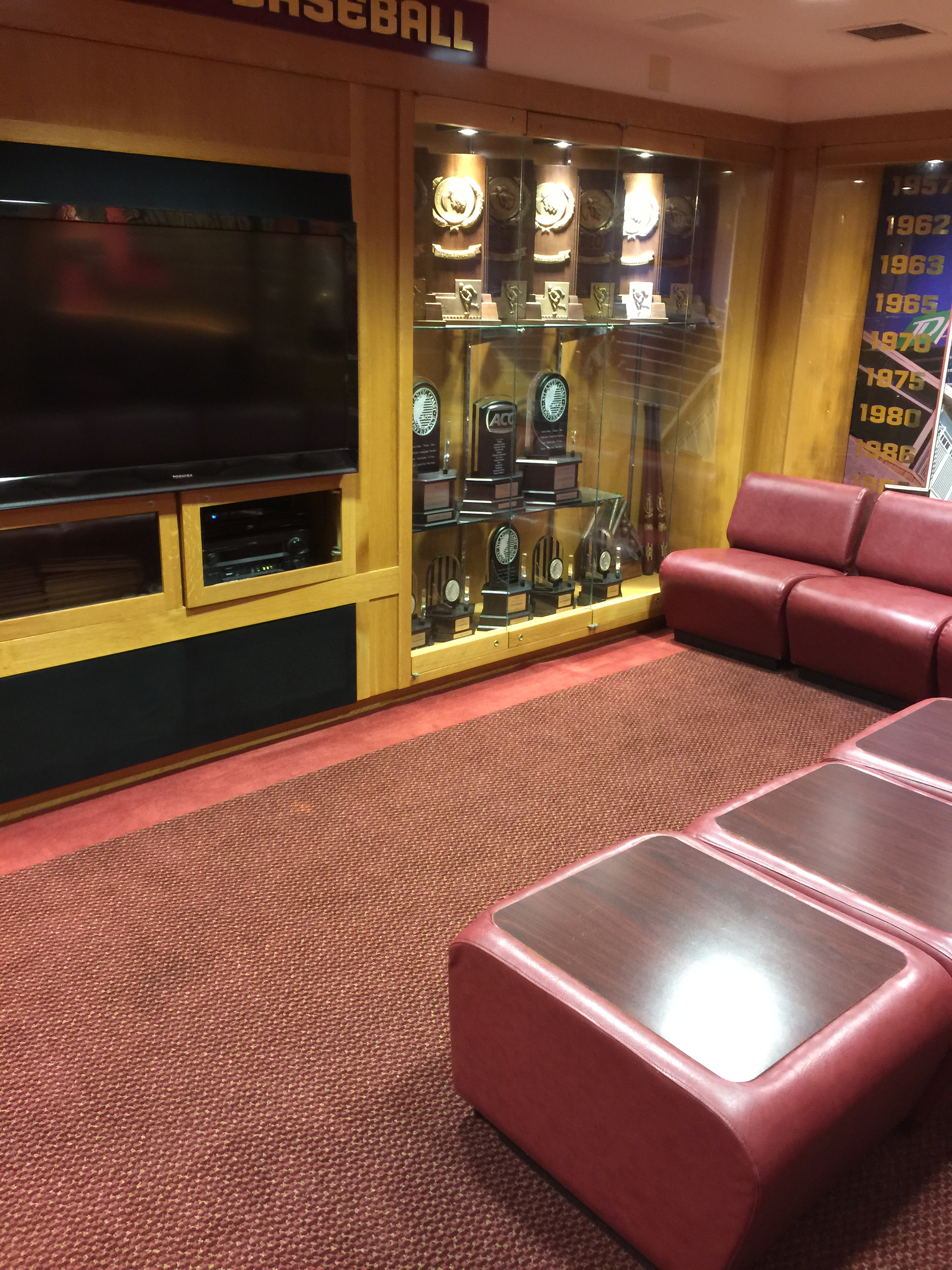
The Seminoles have won multiple ACC division and conference titles.

=== National Championship appearances ===
Florida State has appeared in the College World Series National Championship game three times in 1970, 1986 and 1999.

| Season | Coach | Opponent | Result | Overall record |
|---|---|---|---|---|
| 1970 | Jack Stallings | Southern California | USC 2, FSU 1 (15) | 49–9–1 |
| 1986 | Mike Martin | Arizona | Arizona 10, FSU 2 | 61–13 |
| 1999 | Mike Martin | Miami | Miami 6, FSU 5 | 57–14 |
| Total National Championship Game Appearances | | | | 3 |

=== Divisional Championships ===
| Season | Conference | Division | Coach | Conference |
|---|---|---|---|---|
| 2007 | ACC | Atlantic | Mike Martin | 21–6 |
| 2008 | ACC | Atlantic | Mike Martin | 24–6 |
| 2009 | ACC | Atlantic | Mike Martin | 19–9 |
| 2010 | ACC | Atlantic | Mike Martin | 18–12 |
| 2011 | ACC | Atlantic | Mike Martin | 19–11 |
| 2012 | ACC | Atlantic | Mike Martin | 24–6 |
| 2013 | ACC | Atlantic | Mike Martin | 20–10 |
| 2014 | ACC | Atlantic | Mike Martin | 21–9 |
| Total division titles | | | 8 | |

=== Conference Regular Season Championships ===
| Season | Conference | Coach | Overall | Conference |
|---|---|---|---|---|
| 1986 | Metro | Mike Martin | 61–13 | 13–5 |
| 1989 | Metro | Mike Martin | 54–18 | 14–4 |
| 1990 | Metro | Mike Martin | 57–15 | 17–4 |
| 1991 | Metro | Mike Martin | 57–14 | 14–4 |
| 1996 | ACC | Mike Martin | 52–17 | 19–5 |
| 1998 | ACC | Mike Martin | 53–20 | 18–4 |
| 1999 | ACC | Mike Martin | 57–14 | 22–2 |
| 2001 | ACC | Mike Martin | 47–19 | 20–4 |
| 2002 | ACC | Mike Martin | 60–14 | 18–6 |
| 2003 | ACC | Mike Martin | 54–13–1 | 19–5 |
| 2007 | ACC | Mike Martin | 45–13 | 21–6 |
| 2009 | ACC | Mike Martin | 45–18 | 19–9 |
| 2012 | ACC | Mike Martin | 50–17 | 24–6 |
| Total Conference Titles | | | 13 | |

=== Conference Tournament championships ===
| Season | Conference | Coach | Winning Team | Losing Team |
|---|---|---|---|---|
| 1950 | Dixie | Charlie Armstrong | Florida State 11 | Mercer 6 |
| 1951 | Dixie | Charlie Armstrong | Mississippi College 8 | Florida State 7 |
| 1956 | Florida Intercollegiate | Danny Litwhiler | Florida State 9 | Rollins College 0 |
| 1957 | Florida Intercollegiate | Danny Litwhiler | Florida State 5 | Rollins College 0 |
| 1977 | Metro | Woody Woodward | Florida State 11 | Tulane 1 |
| 1979 | Metro | Dick Howser | Tulane 2 | Florida State 2 |
| 1980 | Metro | Mike Martin | Florida State 11 | Memphis State 7 |
| 1981 | Metro | Mike Martin | Florida State 7 | Memphis State 3 |
| 1982 | Metro | Mike Martin | Tulane 11 | Florida State 7 |
| 1983 | Metro | Mike Martin | Florida State 9 | Tulane 6 |
| 1984 | Metro | Mike Martin | Florida State 11 | South Carolina 10 |
| 1985 | Metro | Mike Martin | Florida State 11 | South Carolina 5 |
| 1986 | Metro | Mike Martin | Florida State 7 | South Carolina 2 |
| 1987 | Metro | Mike Martin | Florida State 6 | Cincinnati 3 |
| 1988 | Metro | Mike Martin | Florida State 9 | South Carolina 1 |
| 1989 | Metro | Mike Martin | Florida State 6 | Southern Mississippi 5 |
| 1990 | Metro | Mike Martin | Florida State 8 | Cincinnati 5 |
| 1991 | Metro | Mike Martin | Florida State 10 | South Carolina 9 |
| 1992 | ACC | Mike Martin | Clemson 11 | Florida State 0 |
| 1994 | ACC | Mike Martin | Clemson 4 | Florida State 1 |
| 1995 | ACC | Mike Martin | Florida State 8 | Clemson 2 |
| 1996 | ACC | Mike Martin | Virginia 12 | Florida State 1 |
| 1997 | ACC | Mike Martin | Florida State 10 | Clemson 0 |
| 1998 | ACC | Mike Martin | Wake Forest 6 | Florida State 3 |
| 2002 | ACC | Mike Martin | Florida State 4 | Clemson 1 |
| 2004 | ACC | Mike Martin | Florida State 17 | Georgia Tech 5 |
| 2009 | ACC | Mike Martin | Virginia 6 | Florida State 3 |
| 2010 | ACC | Mike Martin | Florida State 8 | NC State 3 |
| 2011 | ACC | Mike Martin | Virginia 7 | Florida State 2 |
| 2015 | ACC | Mike Martin | Florida State 6 | NC State 2 |
| 2016 | ACC | Mike Martin | Clemson 18 | Florida State 13 |
| 2017 | ACC | Mike Martin | Florida State 7 | North Carolina 3 |
| 2018 | ACC | Mike Martin | Florida State 11 | Louisville 8 |
| 2024 | ACC | Link Jarrett | Duke 16 | Florida State 4 |
| Championship Results: | | | 23–11 | |

== Awards ==
=== Dick Howser Trophy ===
Dick Howser Trophy winners
| Year | Player | Position |
| 1997 | J. D. Drew | OF |
| 2008 | Buster Posey | C |
| 2025 | Alex Lodise | SS |

=== Golden Spikes Award ===
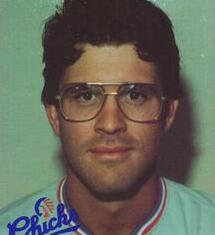
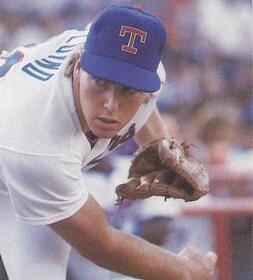
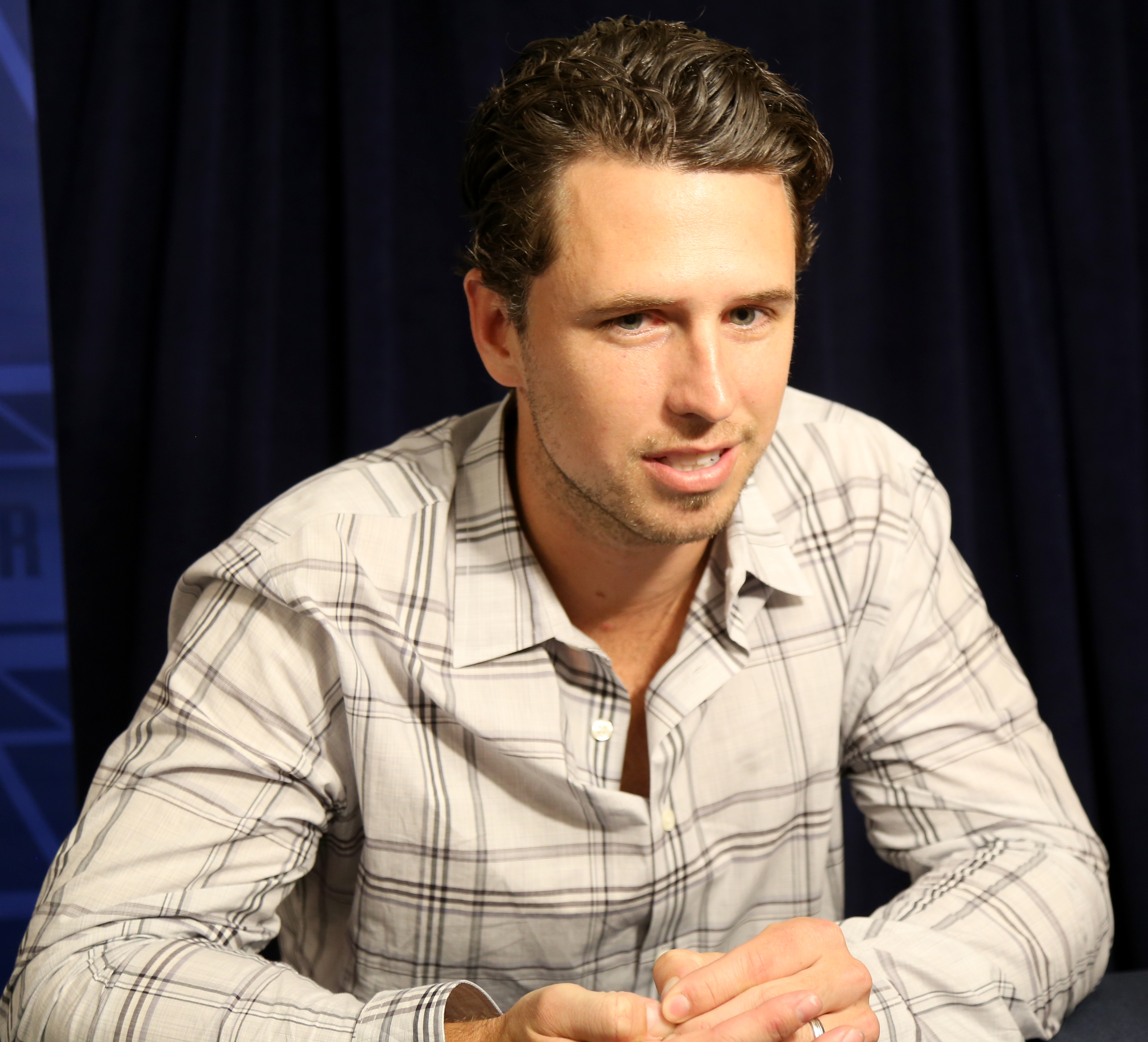
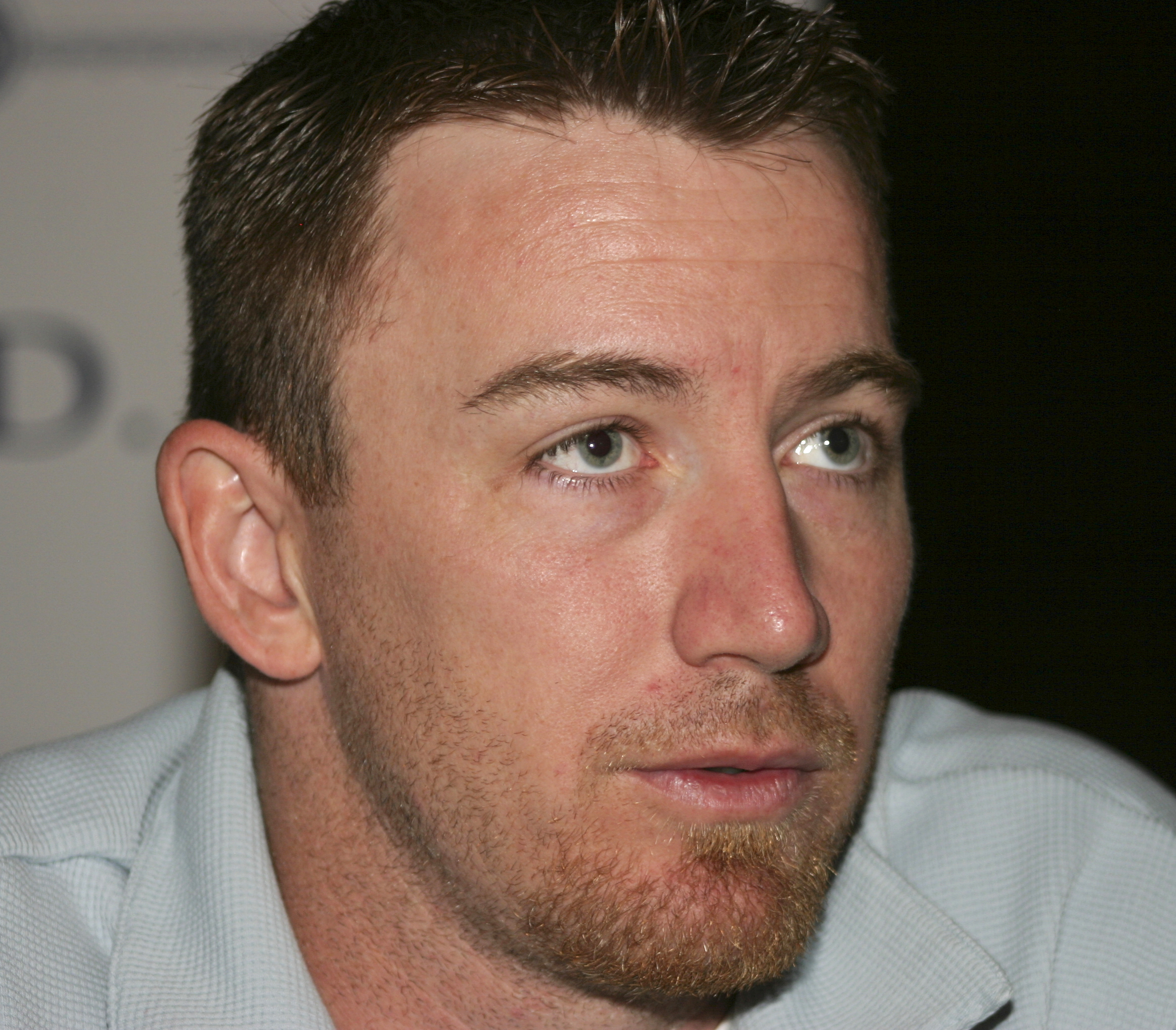
Clockwise from upper left: Mike Fuentes, Mike Loynd, J. D. Drew and Buster Posey

Golden Spikes Award
| Year | Player | Position |
| 1981 | Mike Fuentes | OF |
| 1986 | Mike Loynd | P |
| 1997 | J. D. Drew | OF |
| 2008 | Buster Posey | C |

=== National Awards ===
- Buster Posey Award – Buster Posey (2008), Matheu Nelson (2021)
- Brooks Wallace Award – Buster Posey (2008)
- America Baseball Coaches Association National Player of the Year – J. D. Drew (1997), Buster Posey (2008), James Ramsey (2012)
- Collegiate Baseball National Player of the Year Award – Terry Kennedy (1977), Mike Fuentes (1981), Jeff Ledbetter (1982), Mike Loynd (1986), J. D. Drew (1997), Shane Robinson (2005), Tony Thomas, Jr. (2007), Buster Posey (2008)
- National Rookie of the Year – Matt Diaz (1998), Blair Varnes (1999), Stephen Drew (2002), Sean Gilmartin (2009)
- John Olerud Two-Way Player of the Year – Mike McGee (2010)
- Rawlings Gold Glove Award – Buster Posey (2008), Tyler Holt (2009), Sherman Johnson (2012)
- Lowe's Senior CLASS Award – James Ramsey (2012)
- Baseball America's National Coach of the Year – Mike Martin (2012, 2019)
- Perfect Game/Rawlings National Coach of the Year - Mike Martin (2019)
- Perfect Game Player of the Year: Matheu Nelson (2021)

=== Conference awards ===
- ACC Player of the Year – J. D. Drew (1997), Marshall McDougall (1999), John-Ford Griffin (2001), Tony Thomas, Jr. (2007), Buster Posey (2008), James Ramsey (2012), D. J. Stewart (2014), Matheu Nelson (2021), James Tibbs III (2024), Alex Lodise (2025)
- ACC Pitcher of the Year – Bryan Henry (2007), Parker Messick (2021), Wes Mendes (2026)
- ACC Freshman of the Year – Jonathan Johnson (1993), Stephen Drew (2002), Parker Messick (2021)
- ACC Defensive Player of the Year - Alex Lodise (2025)
- ACC Coach of the Year – Mike Martin (1996, 1998, 1999, 2001, 2007, 2009, 2012)

=== All-Americans ===
- John Abraham
- Luis Alicea
- Jamie Arnold
- Mike Augustine
- Myles Bailey
- Roger Bailey
- Ryan Barthelemy
- Robert Benincasa
- Allen Bevis
- Barry Blackwell
- Guillermo Bonilla
- Jayce Boyd
- Dylan Busby
- Jim Busby
- Brian Busch
- Stephen Cardullo
- Kevin Cash
- Ron Cash
- Tyler Chambliss
- Chris Chavez
- Randy Choate
- Bob Clem
- Mike Compton
- Tom Cook
- Brian Cox
- Wes Crawford
- Daniel Davidson
- Randy Davidson
- Matt Diaz
- J. D. Drew
- Stephen Drew
- Jack Dull
- Matt Fairel
- Frank Fazzini
- Jaime Ferrer
- Bien Figueroa
- Gar Finnvold
- J.C. Flowers
- Mike Fuentes
- Ed Fulton
- Sean Gilmartin
- Dick Gold
- Richard Gonzalez
- Brad Gregory
- John-Ford Griffin
- Pedro Grifol
- Brett Groves
- Johnny Grubb
- Mark Hallberg
- Bryan Henry
- Daniel Hodges
- Tyler Holt
- Tyler Holton
- Dick Howser
- Bryce Hubbart
- Link Jarrett
- Jonathan Johnson
- Terry Kennedy
- Ricky Kimball
- Jeff Ledbetter
- Brandon Leibrandt
- Richie Lewis
- John LiBrandi
- Doug Little
- Alex Lodise
- Mickey Lopez
- Mike Loynd
- Matt Lynch
- Jim Lyttle
- Ryne Malone
- Mike Martin Jr.
- Robby Martin
- Tyler Martin
- Eddy Martinez-Esteve
- Wes Mendes
- Blane McDonald
- Jon McDonald
- Marshall McDougall
- Mike McGee
- Drew Mendoza
- Parker Messick
- Doug Mientkiewicz
- Scooby Morgan
- Jeremy Morris
- Mat Nelson
- Dick Nichols
- Danny O'Brien
- Pat Osburn
- Drew Parrish
- Geoff Parker
- Craig Patterson
- Eduardo Pérez
- Trent Peterson
- Buster Posey
- Jeff Probst
- Cal Raleigh
- James Ramsey
- Ray Revak
- Tony Richie
- Chris Roberts
- Shane Robinson
- Marc Ronan
- Jack Rye
- Jeremy Salazar
- John Sansone
- Mark Sauls
- Brian Schultz
- Jonah Scolaro
- Scott Sitz
- Cam Smith
- Chris Smith
- Paul Sorrento
- Gary Sprague
- D. J. Stewart
- Jason Stidham
- Nick Stocks
- Billy Strode
- Ken Suarez
- Stuart Tapley
- Bud Teagle
- Steve Tebbetts
- Tony Thomas, Jr.
- James Tibbs III
- Devon Travis
- Blair Varnes
- CJ Van Eyk
- Taylor Walls
- Jim Weaver
- Luke Weaver
- Conner Whittaker
- Paul Wilson
- Woody Woodward
- David Yocum
- Scott Zech

== Notable players ==
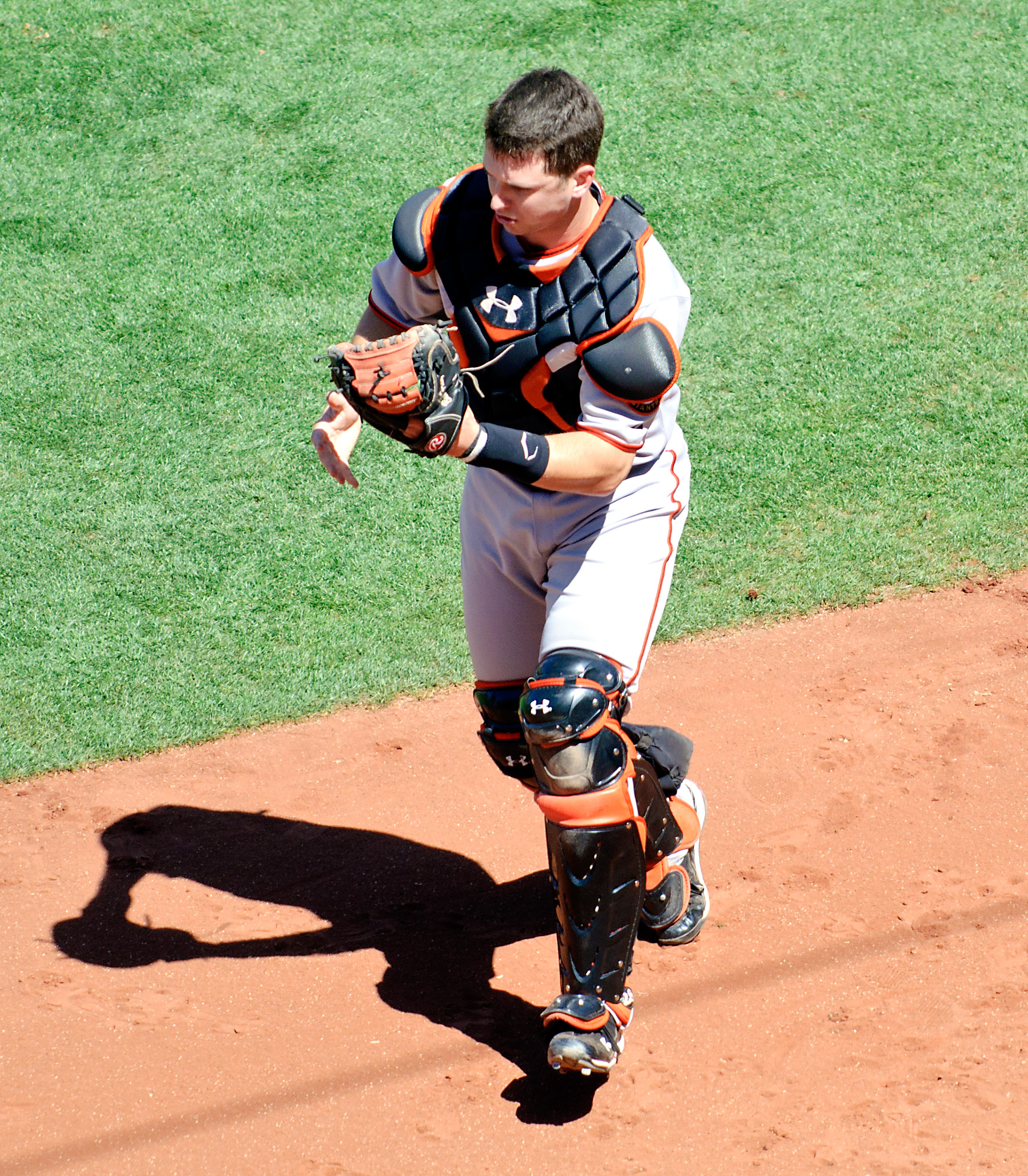
Buster Posey was drafted in the first round of the draft.

=== Drafted players ===
| Year | Round | Pick | Name | Team |
|---|---|---|---|---|
| 1966 | 1st | 10 | Jim Lyttle | New York Yankees |
| 1966 | 6th | 112 (12) | Gary Sprague | Cleveland Indians |
| 1966 | 12th | 222 (2) | Edward Howell | Oakland Athletics |
| 1966 | 18th | 348 (8) | Randy Brown | California Angels |
| 1966 | 28th | 540 (1) | Michael Martin | New York Mets |
| 1966 | 44th | 757 (1) | Cecil Hopkins | New York Mets |
| 1967 | 2nd | 33 (13) | LaDon Boyd | Oakland Athletics |
| 1968 | 1st | 12 | Tom Cook | Oakland Athletics |
| 1968 | 15th | 326 (2) | Stephen Mastin | Oakland Athletics |
| 1968 | 17th | 381 (9) | Charles Hines | Pittsburgh Pirates |
| 1968 | 31st | 705 (20) | Wayne Vincent | Milwaukee Brewers |
| 1969 | 4th | 89 (19) | Dave Moates | Washington Senators |
| 1969 | 14th | 324 (12) | Walter Sumner | Atlanta Braves |
| 1969 | 23rd | 543 (15) | Mike Easom | Cleveland Indians |
| 1969 | 31st | 721 (7) | Jeffrey Hogan | Los Angeles Dodgers |
| 1969 | 37th | 842 (9) | Richard Gold | Chicago Cubs |
| 1970 | 1st | 9 | Pat Osburn | Cincinnati Reds |
| 1970 | 2nd | 47 (23) | Jeffrey Hogan | Detroit Tigers |
| 1970 | 3rd | 56 (8) | Gene Ammann | Milwaukee Brewers |
| 1970 | 3rd | 61 (13) | Johnny Grubb | Atlanta Braves |
| 1970 | 6th | 123 (6) | Walter Sumner | California Angels |
| 1970 | 26th | 621 (14) | Richard Nichols | Boston Red Sox |
| 1971 | 1st | 24 | Johnny Grubb | San Diego Padres |
| 1971 | 2nd | 33 (9) | John Roatche | Minnesota Twins |
| 1971 | 3rd | 66 (19) | Ron Cash | Detroit Tigers |
| 1971 | 8th | 179 (7) | Mac Scarce | Philadelphia Phillies |
| 1971 | 34th | 724 (6) | Gregory Gromek | Detroit Tigers |
| 1975 | 9th | 214 (22) | Randy Davidson | Cincinnati Reds |
| 1975 | 16th | 371 (11) | Dan O'Brien | Chicago White Sox |
| 1976 | 1st | 5 | Steven Tebbetts | California Angels |
| 1976 | 3rd | 47 (3) | Jeffrey Hardy | Cincinnati Reds |
| 1976 | 3rd | 61 (13) | Dan O'Brien | St. Louis Cardinals |
| 1976 | 4th | 94 (22) | Larry Jones | Boston Red Sox |
| 1976 | 13th | 311 (23) | Bob Meyer | Cincinnati Reds |
| 1977 | 1st | 6 | Terry Kennedy | St. Louis Cardinals |
| 1977 | 1st | 11 | Jeffrey Hardy | Chicago Cubs |
| 1977 | 5th | 123 (19) | Larry Jones | Baltimore Orioles |
| 1977 | 16th | 411 (21) | Rickey McGlone | Kansas City Royals |
| 1977 | 17th | 427 (11) | Benjamin Curry | Cleveland Indians |
| 1977 | 18th | 442 (1) | Jackie Smith | Chicago White Sox |
| 1977 | 19th | 488 (22) | Mike McLeod | New York Yankees |
| 1977 | 24th | 606 (20) | Juan Bonilla | New York Yankees |
| 1978 | 2nd | 26 (1) | Blane McDonald | Atlanta Braves |
| 1978 | 10th | 256 (22) | Brooks Carey | Baltimore Orioles |
| 1978 | 14th | 351 (13) | Mark Gilbert | Chicago Cubs |
| 1978 | 22nd | 547 (11) | Robert Benda | Detroit Tigers |
| 1978 | 38th | 754 (3) | Michael Bretz | Pittsburgh Pirates |
| 1979 | 31st | 767 (16) | Craig Patterson | Kansas City Royals |
| 1980 | 2nd | 28 (2) | Edwin Schneider | Cincinnati Reds |
| 1980 | 2nd | 35 (9) | Jim Weaver | Minnesota Twins |
| 1980 | 5th | 115 (12) | Mike Fuentes | Minnesota Twins |
| 1980 | 21st | 540 (21) | Ken Smith | New York Yankees |
| 1980 | 25th | 636 (18) | Don DeLoach | Montreal Expos |
| 1980 | 27th | 671 (10) | Jeffrey Keeler | Arizona Cardinals |
| 1981 | 2nd | 44 (18) | Mike Fuentes | Montreal Expos |
| 1981 | 4th | 95 (18) | Jeff Ledbetter | Montreal Expos |
| 1981 | 7th | 159 (4) | Jeffrey Keeler | New York Mets |
| 1981 | 17th | 420 (5) | Edwin Schneider | Toronto Blue Jays |
| 1981 | 28th | 692 (3) | Joseph Licata | New York Mets |
| 1982 | 1st | 26 | Jeff Ledbetter | Boston Red Sox |
| 1982 | 6th | 144 (12) | David Cawthon | Cleveland Indians |
| 1982 | 8th | 199 (15) | Jamey Shouppe | Houston Astros |
| 1982 | 11th | 274 (12) | Jeffrey Keeler | Cleveland Indians |
| 1982 | 30th | 741 (1) | Tim Phillips | Toronto Blue Jays |
| 1983 | 1st | 4 | Tony Blasucci | Pittsburgh Pirates |
| 1983 | 2nd | 49 (23) | Joey Reed | Texas Rangers |
| 1983 | 4th | 97 (17) | Bruce Tanner | Chicago White Sox |
| 1983 | 8th | 197 (13) | Dave Smalley | New York Yankees |
| 1983 | 23rd | 570 (3) | Mike Yastrzemski | Texas Rangers |
| 1984 | 8th | 198 (14) | Jody Reed | Boston Red Sox |
| 1984 | 12th | 311 (23) | Doug Treadway | Los Angeles Dodgers |
| 1985 | 7th | 176 (18) | Doug Little | St. Louis Cardinals |
| 1985 | 11th | 281 (19) | Mike Loynd | Baltimore Orioles |
| 1985 | 19th | 471 (1) | Frank Fazzini | Milwaukee Brewers |
| 1985 | 21st | 534 (12) | Steve Gelmine | Houston Astros |
| 1985 | 22nd | 560 (12) | Kevin Smith | Houston Astros |
| 1986 | 1st | 7 | Ray Revak | Boston Red Sox |
| 1986 | 1st | 23 | Luis Alicea | St. Louis Cardinals |
| 1986 | 4th | 103 (22) | Paul Sorrento | California Angels |
| 1986 | 5th | 130 (23) | Bien Fiqueroa | St. Louis Cardinals |
| 1986 | 7th | 163 (4) | Mike Loynd | Texas Rangers |
| 1986 | 10th | 257 (20) | Doug Little | Chicago White Sox |
| 1986 | 17th | 438 (19) | Eric Mangham | Los Angeles Dodgers |
| 1987 | 2nd | 44 (12) | Richie Lewis | Montreal Expos |
| 1987 | 10th | 252 (12) | Chris Pollack | Montreal Expos |
| 1987 | 11th | 277 (11) | Jerry Nielsen | Oakland Athletics |
| 1987 | 12th | 300 (8) | Barry Blackwell | Los Angeles Dodgers |
| 1987 | 16th | 399 (3) | Jose Marzan | Minnesota Twins |
| 1987 | 16th | 404 (8) | John Wanish | Los Angeles Dodgers |
| 1987 | 16th | 410 (14) | Ed Fulton | St. Louis Cardinals |
| 1987 | 19th | 482 (8) | Rafael Bournigal | Los Angeles Dodgers |
| 1987 | 55th | 1215 (5) | Steve Taddeo | New York Yankees |
| 1988 | 9th | 216 (3) | Ed Alicia | Atlanta Braves |
| 1988 | 17th | 423 (2) | Barry Blackwell | Cleveland Indians |
| 1988 | 18th | 469 (22) | Jerry Nielsen | New York Yankees |
| 1988 | 30th | 781 (22) | Deion Sanders | New York Yankees |
| 1989 | 10th | 253 (9) | Ronald Lewis | California Angels |
| 1989 | 21st | 555 (25) | Timothy Nedin | Minnesota Twins |
| 1989 | 32nd | 822 (6) | Clyde Keller | St. Louis Cardinals |
| 1990 | 3rd | 86 (13) | Marc Ronan | St. Louis Cardinals |
| 1990 | 6th | 173 (19) | Gar Finnvold | Boston Red Sox |
| 1990 | 9th | 236 (1) | Brad Gregory | Miami Miracle |
| 1990 | 17th | 465 (14) | Richard Kimball | St. Louis Cardinals |
| 1990 | 25th | 672 (10) | Matt Dunbar | New York Yankees |
| 1990 | 36th | 957 (9) | Michael Brady | Los Angeles Dodgers |
| 1991 | 1st | 17 | Eduardo Pérez | California Angels |
| 1991 | 2nd | 49 (5) | James Lewis | Houston Astros |
| 1991 | 6th | 154 (3) | Pedro Grifol | Minnesota Twins |
| 1991 | 7th | 203 (26) | Richard Kimball | Oakland Athletics |
| 1991 | 10th | 276 (21) | Ken Robinson | Toronto Blue Jays |
| 1991 | 25th | 649 (4) | Garrett Blanton | St. Louis Cardinals |
| 1991 | 34th | 882 (3) | Tim Davis | Minnesota Twins |
| 1992 | 1st | 12 | Ken Felder | Milwaukee Brewers |
| 1992 | 1st | 18 | Chris Roberts | New York Mets |
| 1992 | 3rd | 95 (27) | Roger Bailey | Colorado Rockies |
| 1992 | 6th | 166 (14) | Tim Davis | Seattle Mariners |
| 1992 | 12th | 341 (21) | Chris Brock | Atlanta Braves |
| 1992 | 18th | 491 (3) | Jim Rushworth | Montreal Expos |
| 1992 | 38th | 1069 (21) | Terrell Buckley | Atlanta Braves |
| 1993 | 1st | 25 | John Wasdin | Oakland Athletics |
| 1993 | 18th | 495 (3) | Bryan Harris | California Angels |
| 1993 | 22nd | 617 (13) | Michael Schmitz | New York Yankees |
| 1993 | 59th | 1556 (13) | Charlie Ward | Milwaukee Brewers |
| 1994 | 1st | 1 | Paul Wilson | New York Mets |
| 1994 | 17th | 469 (14) | Mike Martin | Seattle Mariners |
| 1994 | 18th | 507 (24) | Charlie Ward | New York Yankees |
| 1994 | 22nd | 602 (7) | Lincoln Jarrett | Colorado Rockies |
| 1994 | 41st | 1150 (25) | Colby Weaver | Atlanta Braves |
| 1995 | 1st | 7 | Jonathan Johnson | Texas Rangers |
| 1995 | 1st | 20 | David Yocum | Los Angeles Dodgers |
| 1995 | 5th | 128 (13) | Doug Mientkiewicz | Minnesota Twins |
| 1995 | 9th | 229 (2) | Mike Martin | San Diego Padres |
| 1995 | 13th | 348 (9) | Mickey Lopez | Milwaukee Brewers |
| 1995 | 13th | 365 (26) | Charlie Cruz | Atlanta Braves |
| 1995 | 20th | 553 (18) | Phil Olson | New York Mets |
| 1995 | 20th | 563 (28) | Mike Bell | Montreal Expos |
| 1995 | 25th | 702 (27) | Danny Kanell | New York Yankees |
| 1995 | 34th | 953 (26) | Randy Hodges | Atlanta Braves |
| 1996 | 9th | 259 (14) | Jeremy Morris | Kansas City Royals |
| 1996 | 38th | 1123 (8) | Adam Faurot | Milwaukee Brewers |
| 1996 | 51st | 1466 (8) | Mike Davis | New York Mets |
| 1997 | 1st | 2 | J. D. Drew | Philadelphia Phillies |
| 1997 | 5th | 169 (25) | Randy Choate | New York Yankees |
| 1997 | 8th | 259 (25) | Jeremy Morris | New York Yankees |
| 1997 | 14th | 436 (22) | Scott Zech | Montreal Expos |
| 1997 | 20th | 605 (11) | Randy Niles | Oakland Athletics |
| 1997 | 31st | 943 (19) | Matt Woodward | Seattle Mariners |
| 1998 | 1st | 5 | J. D. Drew | St. Louis Cardinals |
| 1998 | 5th | 156 (23) | Scott Proctor | Los Angeles Dodgers |
| 1998 | 19th | 554 (1) | Jeremy Salazar | Philadelphia Phillies |
| 1998 | 24th | 725 (22) | Matt Woodward | Seattle Mariners |
| 1998 | 26th | 791 (28) | Brian Cox | Atlanta Braves |
| 1999 | 1st | 36 | Nick Stocks | St. Louis Cardinals |
| 1999 | 17th | 505 (1) | Matt Diaz | Tampa Bay Rays |
| 1999 | 26th | 799 (25) | Marshall McDougall | Boston Red Sox |
| 1999 | 27th | 834 (30) | Chris Chavez | Atlanta Braves |
| 2000 | 9th | 270 (20) | Marshall McDougall | Oakland Athletics |
| 2000 | 14th | 420 (20) | Mike Ziegler | Oakland Athletics |
| 2000 | 16th | 476 (16) | Jared Jones | Seattle Mariners |
| 2000 | 22nd | 642 (2) | Brett Groves | Minnesota Twins |
| 2000 | 41st | 1228 (19) | Karl Jernigan | Oakland Athletics |
| 2001 | 1st | 23 | John-Ford Griffin | New York Yankees |
| 2001 | 22nd | 676 (30) | Karl Jernigan | San Francisco Giants |
| 2002 | 7th | 205 (13) | Matt Lynch | San Diego Padres |
| 2002 | 7th | 209 (17) | Robby Read | Philadelphia Phillies |
| 2002 | 10th | 299 (17) | Ryan Barthelemy | Philadelphia Phillies |
| 2003 | 4th | 103 (6) | Tony Richie | Chicago Cubs |
| 2003 | 5th | 150 (23) | Brandon Balkcom | California Angels |
| 2003 | 5th | 152 (25) | Trent Peterson | Oakland Athletics |
| 2003 | 10th | 302 (25) | Matt Lynch | Oakland Athletics |
| 2003 | 13th | 390 (23) | Daniel Davidson | Anaheim Angels |
| 2003 | 15th | 433 (6) | Tony McQuade | Chicago Cubs |
| 2003 | 21st | 616 (9) | Marc LaMacchia | Texas Rangers |
| 2003 | 26th | 775 (18) | Daniel Hodges | Philadelphia Phillies |
| 2004 | 1st | 15 | Stephen Drew | Arizona Diamondbacks |
| 2004 | 2nd | 70 (29) | Eddy Martinez-Esteve | San Francisco Giants |
| 2004 | 20th | 608 (27) | Rhett James | Miami Marlins |
| 2004 | 24th | 704 (3) | Bryan Zech | New York Mets |
| 2004 | 44th | 1314 (16) | Eddie Cannon | Toronto Blue Jays |
| 2005 | 26th | 793 (23) | Kevin Lynch | Los Angeles Angels of Anaheim |
| 2005 | 29th | 877 (17) | Aaron Cheesman | Philadelphia Phillies |
| 2005 | 38th | 1137 (7) | Barret Browning | Colorado Rockies |
| 2006 | 5th | 166 (30) | Shane Robinson | St. Louis Cardinals |
| 2006 | 11th | 317 (1) | Tyler Chambliss | Kansas City Royals |
| 2006 | 28th | 852 (26) | Barret Browning | Los Angeles Angels of Anaheim |
| 2006 | 39th | 1170 (14) | Luke Tucker | Toronto Blue Jays |
| 2006 | 49th | 1459 (13) | Ryne Malone | Chicago Cubs |
| 2007 | 3rd | 97 (3) | Tony Thomas, Jr. | Chicago Cubs |
| 2007 | 9th | 280 (6) | Mark Gildea | Washington Nationals |
| 2007 | 9th | 283 (9) | Mark Hallberg | Arizona Diamondbacks |
| 2007 | 12th | 373 (9) | Bryan Henry | Arizona Diamondbacks |
| 2007 | 35th | 1077 (27) | Ryan Strauss | Minnesota Twins |
| 2007 | 41st | 1226 (9) | Danny Rosen | Arizona Diamondbacks |
| 2007 | 46th | 1355 (10) | Jack Rye | San Francisco Giants |
| 2007 | 49th | 1418 (7) | Brandon Reichert | Colorado Rockies |
| 2008 | 1st | 5 | Buster Posey | San Francisco Giants |
| 2008 | 6th | 187 (15) | Tony Delmonico | Los Angeles Dodgers |
| 2008 | 9th | 270 (8) | Ryan Strauss | Chicago White Sox |
| 2008 | 13th | 410 (28) | Jack Rye | New York Yankees |
| 2008 | 17th | 513 (11) | Dennis Guinn | Texas Rangers |
| 2008 | 27th | 808 (6) | Elih Villanueva | Miami Marlins |
| 2008 | 35th | 1049 (7) | Matt Fairel | Cincinnati Reds |
| 2009 | 5th | 166 (25) | D'Vontrey Richardson | Milwaukee Brewers |
| 2009 | 8th | 249 (18) | Jason Stidham | St. Louis Cardinals |
| 2009 | 23rd | 697 (16) | Jimmy Marshall | Los Angeles Dodgers |
| 2010 | 6th | 199 (24) | John Gast | St. Louis Cardinals |
| 2010 | 9th | 290 (25) | Geoff Parker | Colorado Rockies |
| 2010 | 10th | 300 (5) | Tyler Holt | Cleveland Indians |
| 2010 | 24th | 721 (6) | Stephen Cardullo | Arizona Diamondbacks |
| 2010 | 31st | 947 (22) | Taiwan Easterling | Miami Marlins |
| 2010 | 41st | 1231 (6) | Mike McGee | Arizona Diamondbacks |
| 2011 | 1st | 28 | Sean Gilmartin | Atlanta Braves |
| 2011 | 15th | 453 (2) | Mike McGee | Seattle Mariners |
| 2011 | 16th | 489 (8) | Rafael Lopez | Chicago Cubs |
| 2011 | 19th | 587 (16) | Dan Bennett | Detroit Tigers |
| 2011 | 22nd | 688 (27) | James Ramsey | Minnesota Twins |
| 2011 | 27th | 819 (8) | Taiwan Easterling | Chicago Cubs |
| 2012 | 1st | 13 | James Ramsey | St. Louis Cardinals |
| 2012 | 6th | 200 (12) | Jayce Boyd | New York Mets |
| 2012 | 7th | 234 (16) | Robert Benincasa | Washington Nationals |
| 2012 | 13th | 424 (26) | Devon Travis | Detroit Tigers |
| 2012 | 14th | 447 (19) | Sherman Johnson | Los Angeles Angels of Anaheim |
| 2012 | 14th | 454 (26) | Hunter Scantling | Detroit Tigers |
| 2012 | 27th | 836 (18) | Justin Gonzalez | Los Angeles Dodgers |
| 2013 | 9th | 277 (21) | Stephen McGee | Los Angeles Angels of Anaheim |
| 2013 | 16th | 484 (18) | Peter Miller | Los Angeles Dodgers |
| 2013 | 24th | 718 (12) | Marcus Davis | San Diego Padres |
| 2013 | 28th | 836 (10) | Robert Coles | New York Mets |
| 2013 | 28th | 846 (20) | Scott Sitz | Detroit Tigers |
| 2014 | 1st | 27 | Luke Weaver | St. Louis Cardinals |
| 2014 | 6th | 172 (7) | Brandon Leibrandt | Philadelphia Phillies |
| 2014 | 9th | 261 (6) | Peter Miller | Seattle Mariners |
| 2014 | 9th | 270 (15) | Justin Gonzalez | Arizona Diamondbacks |
| 2014 | 16th | 492 (27) | Jose Brizuela | Oakland Athletics |
| 2014 | 25th | 760 (25) | Gage Smith | Detroit Tigers |
| 2014 | 34th | 1032 (27) | John Nogowski | Oakland Athletics |
| 2015 | 1st | 25 | D. J. Stewart | Baltimore Orioles |
| 2015 | 9th | 268 (13) | Danny De La Calle | Tampa Bay Rays |
| 2015 | 10th | 304 (19) | Billy Strode | Cleveland Indians |
| 2015 | 11th | 335 (20) | Dylan Silva | Seattle Mariners |
| 2015 | 14th | 428 (23) | Boomer Biegalski | Oakland Athletics |
| 2015 | 24th | 706 (1) | Bryant Holtmann | Arizona Diamondbacks |
| 2015 | 37th | 1125 (30) | Josh Delph | Los Angeles Angels of Anaheim |
| 2016 | 8th | 228 (2) | John Sansone | Cincinnati Reds |
| 2017 | 3rd | 79 (4) | Taylor Walls | Tampa Bay Rays |
| 2017 | 3rd | 88 (13) | Dylan Busby | Pittsburgh Pirates |
| 2017 | 26th | 773 (8) | Quincy Nieporte | Philadelphia Phillies |
| 2017 | 29th | 865 (10) | Cobi Johnson | Los Angeles Angels of Anaheim |
| 2017 | 32nd | 965 (20) | Drew Carlton | Detroit Tigers |
| 2017 | 33rd | 986 (11) | Alec Byrd | Colorado Rockies |
| 2017 | 34th | 1035 (30) | Andrew Karp | Chicago Cubs |
| 2017 | 35th | 1049 (14) | Tyler Holton | Miami Marlins |
| 2017 | 38th | 1144 (19) | Jim Voyles | St. Louis Cardinals |
| 2018 | 3rd | 90 (12) | Cal Raleigh | Seattle Mariners |
| 2018 | 5th | 154 (20) | Cole Sands | Minnesota Twins |
| 2018 | 6th | 191 (27) | Andrew Karp | Washington Nationals |
| 2018 | 8th | 242 (18) | Jackson Lueck | Kansas City Royals |
| 2018 | 9th | 279 (25) | Tyler Holton | Arizona Diamondbacks |
| 2018 | 28th | 842 (18) | Rhett Aplin | Kansas City Royals |
| 2018 | 30th | 896 (12) | Cobi Johnson | Toronto Blue Jays |
| 2019 | 3rd | 94 | Drew Mendoza | Washington Nationals |
| 2019 | 4th | 124 | J.C. Flowers | Pittsburgh Pirates |
| 2019 | 8th | 229 | Drew Parrish | Kansas City Royals |
| 2019 | 9th | 276 | Mike Salvatore | Seattle Mariners |
| 2020 | 2nd | 42 | CJ Van Eyk | Toronto Blue Jays |
| 2020 | 5th | 148 | Shane Drohan | Boston Red Sox |
| 2021 | 1st | 35 | Matheu Nelson | Cincinnati Reds |
| 2021 | 8th | 230 | Robby Martin | Colorado Rockies |
| 2021 | 10th | 299 | Hunter Perdue | Miami Marlins |
| 2021 | 16th | 465 | Jack Anderson | Detroit Tigers |
| 2021 | 17th | 511 | Elijah Cabell | Arizona Cardinals |
| 2021 | 18th | 527 | Conor Grady | Baltimore Orioles |
| 2021 | 20th | 590 | Tyler Ahearn | Colorado Rockies |
| 2022 | 2nd | 54 | Parker Messick | Cleveland Guardians |
| 2022 | 3rd | 94 | Bryce Hubbart | Cincinnati Reds |
| 2022 | 16th | 472 | Brett Roberts | Miami Marlins |
| 2023 | 2nd | 63 | Jackson Baumeister | Baltimore Orioles |
| 2023 | 4th | 127 | Wyatt Crowell | Los Angeles Dodgers |
| 2023 | 11th | 341 | Carson Montgomery | San Diego Padres |
| 2024 | 1st | 13 | James Tibbs III | San Francisco Giants |
| 2024 | 1st | 14 | Cam Smith | Chicago Cubs |
| 2024 | 4th | 123 | Marco Dinges | Milwaukee Brewers |
| 2024 | 4th | 126 | Jaime Ferrer | Minnesota Twins |
| 2024 | 7th | 219 | Carson Dorsey | Baltimore Orioles |
| 2024 | 8th | 234 | Gavin Adams | Pittsburgh Pirates |
| 2024 | 14th | 410 | Yoel Tejeda | Washington Nationals |
| 2024 | 15th | 445 | Conner Whittaker | Cleveland Guardians |
| 2025 | 1st | 11 | Jamie Arnold | Oakland Athletics |
| 2025 | 2nd | 60 | Alex Lodise | Atlanta Braves |
| 2025 | 2nd | 65 | Cam Leiter | Los Angeles Dodgers |
| 2025 | 3rd | 78 | Max Williams | Miami Marlins |
| 2025 | 4th | 108 | Drew Faurot | Miami Marlins |
| 2025 | 5th | 163 | Peyton Prescott | New York Mets |
| 2025 | 6th | 168 | Joey Volini | Miami Marlins |
| 2025 | 15th | 462 | Evan Chrest | Cleveland Guardians |
| 2025 | 16th | 469 | Gage Harrelson | Los Angeles Angels |
| 2025 | 16th | 472 | Jaxson West | Toronto Blue Jays |
| 2025 | 16th | 474 | Maison Martinez | Cincinnati Reds |
| 2026 | 2nd | 57 | Wes Mendes | Houston Astros |
| 2026 | 2nd | 75 | Myles Bailey | Chicago Cubs |
| 2026 | 3rd | 88 | Brayden Dowd | Arizona Diamondbacks |
| 2026 | 5th | 147 | Trey Beard | Miami Marlins |
| 2026 | 7th | 198 | Bryson Moore | Pittsburgh Pirates |
| 2026 | 12th | 353 | Cole Stokes | Tampa Bay Rays |
| 2026 | 12th | 362 | Brodie Purcell | Cincinnati Reds |

=== Hall of Fame inductees ===
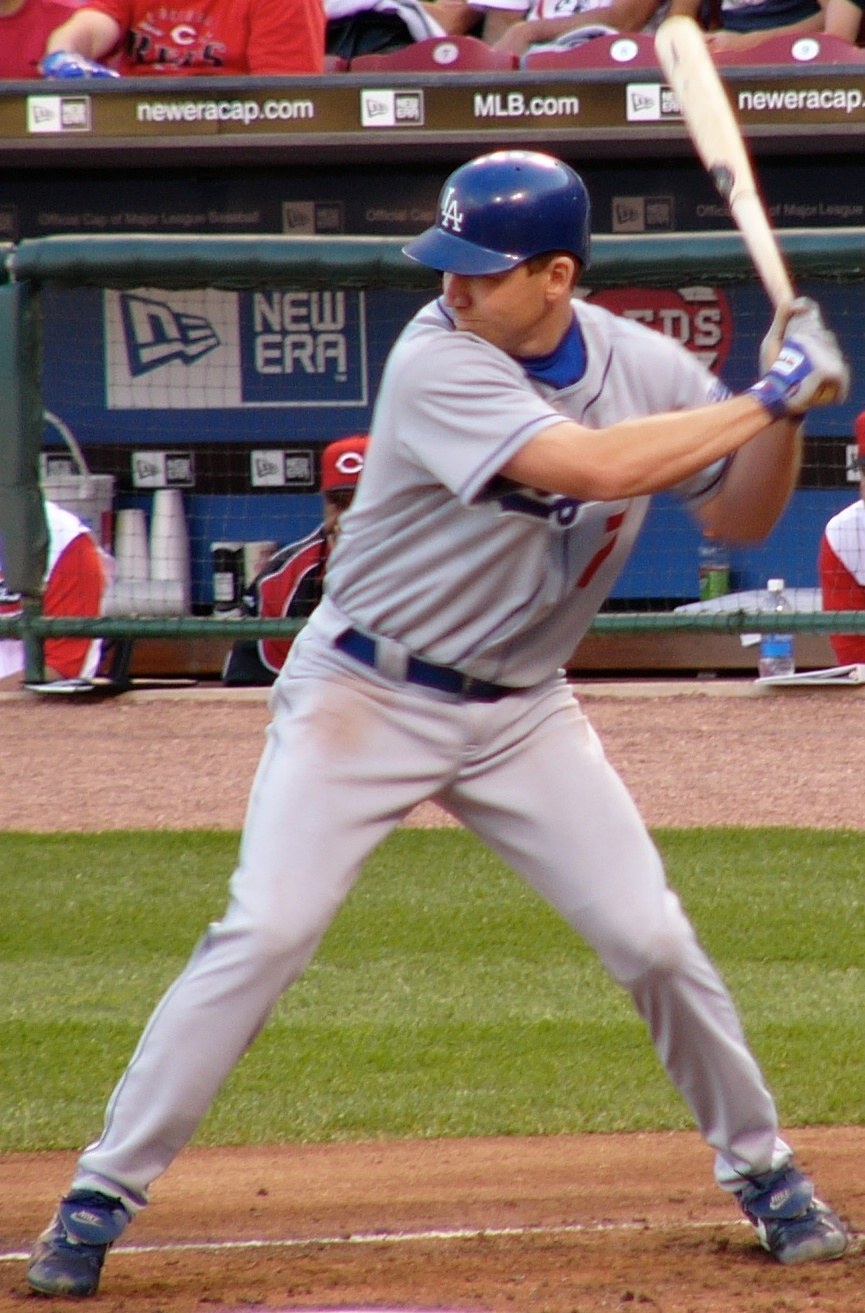
J. D. Drew is a member of the Hall of Fame.

Seven FSU players and two coaches have been inducted into the College Baseball Hall of Fame.

College Baseball Hall of Fame inductees
| Year Inducted | Name | Position | Career |
| 2008 | Dick Howser | SS | 1956–58 |
| 2016 | J. D. Drew | RF | 1995–97 |
| 2019 | Mike Martin | HC | 1980-2019 |
| 2021 | Danny Litwhiler | HC | 1955-63 |
| 2021 | Terry Kennedy | C | 1975-77 |
| 2024 | Mike Fuentes | OF | 1978-81 |
| 2025 | Gene Ammann | P | 1968-70 |
| 2025 | Mike Loynd | P | 1983-86 |
| 2026 | Buster Posey | C | 2006-08 |

=== Retired jerseys ===
Retired jersey numbers
| No. | Name | Position | Career |
| 34 | Dick Howser | SS | 1956–58 (player); 1979 (coach) |
| 39 | J.D. Drew | RF | 1995–97 |
| 11 | Mike Martin | CF | 1965–66 (player); 1980–2019 (coach) |
| 8 | Buster Posey | C | 2006–08 |

=== Notable former players ===
| Athlete | Notability |
|---|---|
| Luis Alicea | professional MLB baseball player |
| Mike Bell | head coach, Pittsburgh Panthers baseball team |
| Bruce Bochy | professional MLB baseball player and current manager of the Texas Rangers |
| Rafael Bournigal | professional MLB baseball player |
| Dick Brown | professional MLB baseball player |
| Barret Browning | professional MLB baseball player, St. Louis Cardinals |
| Stephen Cardullo | professional MLB baseball player |
| Kevin Cash | professional MLB baseball player, Boston Red Sox', current manager of Tampa Bay Rays |
| Randy Choate | professional MLB baseball player |
| Matt Diaz | professional MLB baseball player, Pittsburgh Pirates |
| J. D. Drew | professional MLB baseball player, Boston Red Sox |
| Stephen Drew | professional MLB baseball player |
| Ron Fraser | former college baseball coach at the University of Miami from 1963–1992. Won the College World Series in 1982 and 1985 |
| Mark Gilbert | professional MLB baseball player, Chicago White Sox, and US Ambassador to New Zealand and Samoa |
| Sean Gilmartin | professional MLB baseball player |
| John-Ford Griffin | professional MLB baseball player, Toronto Blue Jays |
| Johnny Grubb | professional MLB baseball player |
| Dick Howser | professional MLB baseball player and manager, Florida State's first baseball All-American and once manager |
| Jonathan Johnson | professional MLB baseball player |
| Terry Kennedy | professional MLB baseball player |
| Tony La Russa | former MLB manager, St. Louis Cardinals |
| Rick Langford | professional MLB baseball player |
| Richie Lewis | professional MLB baseball player |
| Mike Loynd | professional MLB baseball player |
| Jim Lyttle | professional MLB baseball player |
| Mike Martin | head coach, Florida State Seminoles |
| Marshall McDougall | professional MLB baseball player, Texas Rangers record holder for most home runs in a college game (6) |
| Parker Messick | professional MLB player |
| Doug Mientkiewicz | professional MLB baseball player |
| Eduardo Pérez | professional MLB baseball player, former analyst for ESPN's Baseball Tonight, hitting coach for Miami Marlins |
| Scott Proctor | professional MLB baseball player, Atlanta Braves |
| Cal Raleigh | professional MLB baseball player, Seattle Mariners |
| James Ramsey | head coach at Georgia Tech |
| Jody Reed | professional MLB baseball player |
| Shane Robinson | professional MLB baseball player |
| Larry Rothschild | professional MLB baseball player and former manager, Tampa Bay Rays |
| Deion Sanders | professional MLB baseball player, Pro Football Hall of Famer |
| Mac Scarce | professional MLB baseball player |
| Cam Smith | professional MLB baseball player, Houston Astros |
| Paul Sorrento | professional MLB baseball player |
| D. J. Stewart | professional MLB baseball player, Baltimore Orioles |
| Ken Suarez | professional MLB baseball player |
| Devon Travis | professional MLB baseball player, Toronto Blue Jays |
| Elih Villanueva | professional MLB baseball player, Miami Marlins |
| John Wasdin | professional MLB baseball player, Texas Rangers |
| Luke Weaver | professional MLB baseball player, New York Mets |
| Jameis Winston | Heisman Trophy winning quarterback, pitched for the Seminoles from 2013–14 |
| Woody Woodward | professional MLB baseball player, former FSU head coach, former general manager for the New York Yankees, and Seattle Mariners |

== See also ==
- Florida State Seminoles
- Florida State Seminoles softball
- History of Florida State University
- List of Florida State University people § Athletes
