= Mike Martin Jr. =

American baseball coach (born 1973)

Biographical details
- Born: February 19, 1973 (age 52); Tallahassee, Florida, U.S.

Playing career
- 1992: Manatee Community College
- 1993–1995: Florida State
- 1995–1996: Clinton LumberKings
- 1997: Lancaster JetHawks
- Position: Catcher

Coaching career (HC unless noted)
- 1998–2019: Florida State (asst)
- 2020–2022: Florida State

Head coaching record
- Overall: 77–54
- Tournaments: ACC: 2–2; NCAA: 2–4

Michael David Martin Jr. (born February 19, 1973) is an American baseball coach and former catcher. He was most recently the head baseball coach at Florida State University. Martin played college baseball at Manatee Community College in 1992 and at Florida State University from 1993 to 1995 for coach Mike Martin and in Minor League Baseball (MiLB) for three seasons from 1995 to 1997.

Martin was born in Tallahassee, Florida. His father, Mike Martin Sr. was a center fielder for Florida State and a college coach at Florida State. He attended Maclay School in Tallahassee. After graduation from high school, he was selected by the Seattle Mariners in the 34th round of the 1991 Major League Baseball draft, but decided to attend Manatee Community College to play baseball. After his freshman year, he was recruited to play college baseball at Florida State. After his junior year, he was once again selected by the Mariners, this time in the 1994 Major League Baseball draft's 17th round. In the summer of 1994, he played collegiate summer baseball with the Orleans Cardinals of the Cape Cod Baseball League. Martin returned to Florida State for his senior season where he was drafted in the ninth round of the 1995 Major League Baseball draft by the San Diego Padres.

In 2019, Martin was named the head coach of the Florida State Seminoles baseball program, succeeding his father.

Martin was fired from his position of head coach on June 10, 2022.

Statistics overview
Season	Team	Overall	Conference	Standing	Postseason
Florida State Seminoles (Atlantic Coast Conference) (2020–2022)
2020	Florida State	12–5	1–2		Season canceled due to COVID-19
2021	Florida State	31–24	20–16	3rd (Atlantic)	NCAA Regional
2022	Florida State	34–25	15–15	4th (Atlantic)	NCAA Regional
Florida State:		77–54	36–33		
Total:		77–54			
National champion Postseason invitational champion Conference regular season champion Conference regular season and conference tournament champion Division regular season champion Division regular season and conference tournament champion Conference tournament champion

== See also ==
- List of current NCAA Division I baseball coaches
