= Drew Parrish =

American baseball player (born 1997)

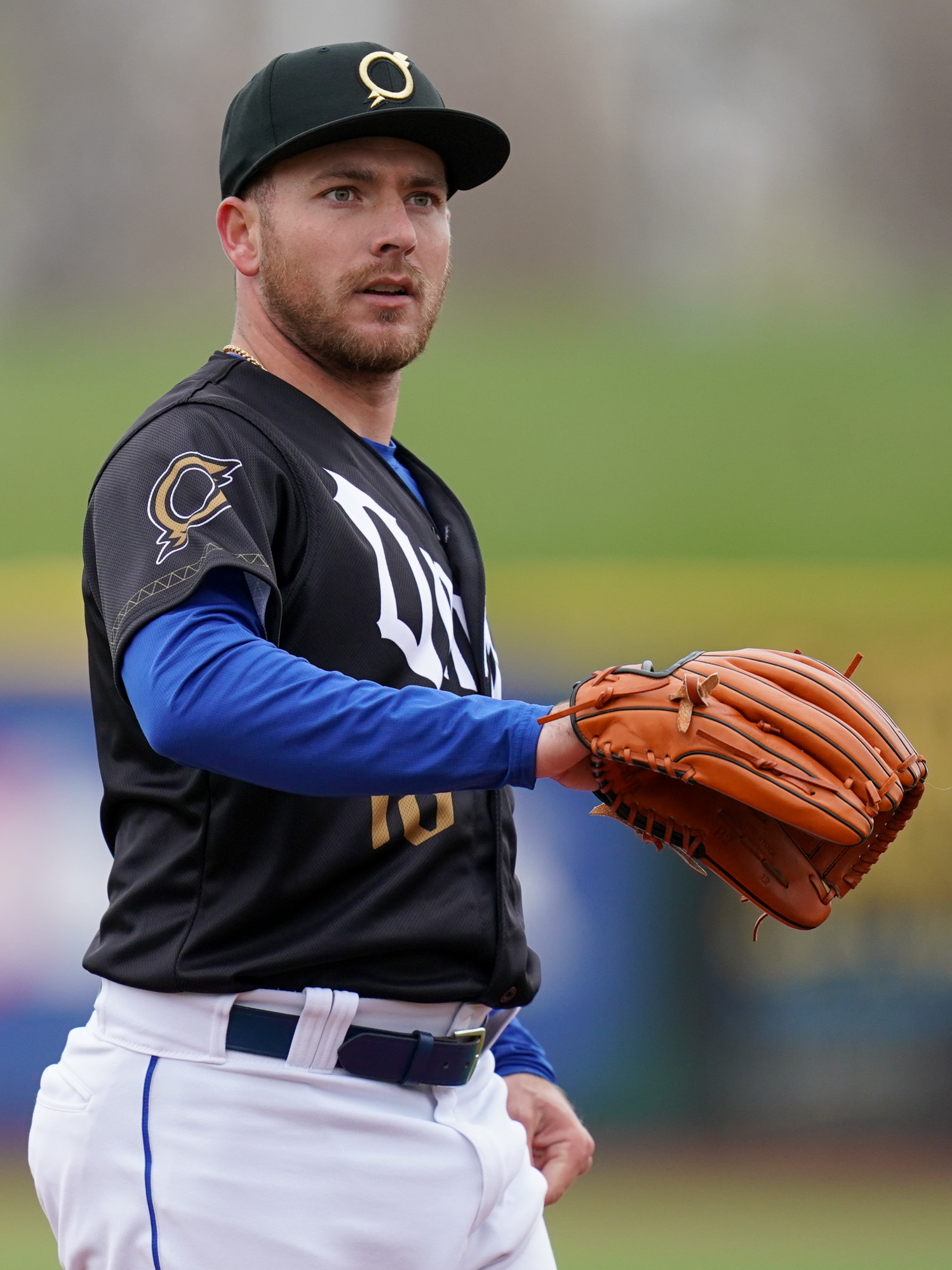
- Parrish with the Omaha Storm Chasers in 2023

Tecolotes de los Dos Laredos – No. 82
- Pitcher
- Born: December 8, 1997 (age 28); Rockledge, Florida, U.S.
- Bats: Left Throws: Left

Andrew Patrick Parrish (born December 8, 1997) is an American professional baseball pitcher for the Tecolotes de los Dos Laredos of the Mexican League.

== Amateur career ==
Parrish attended Rockledge High School in Rockledge, Florida, and Florida State University, where he played college baseball for the Florida State Seminoles.

== Professional career ==
=== Kansas City Royals ===
The Kansas City Royals selected Parrish in the eighth round, with the 229th overall selection, of the 2019 Major League Baseball draft, and he signed with the Royals. Parrish made his professional debut with the rookie–level Burlington Royals, and posted a 2.52 ERA across 9 appearances.

Parrish did not play in a game in 2020 due to the cancellation of the minor league season because of the COVID-19 pandemic. Parrish began the 2021 season with the High–A Quad Cities River Bandits, and was promoted to the Double–A Northwest Arkansas Naturals during the season. In 22 games (18 starts) between the two affiliates, he accumulated a 6–4 record and 2.83 ERA with 118 strikeouts in 98 2/3 innings pitched. In May 2021, Parrish was named to the roster of the United States national baseball team for the Americas qualifying tournament for the 2020 Summer Olympics. He was not included on the roster for the Olympics.

Parrish began the 2022 season with Northwest Arkansas and was promoted to the Triple–A Omaha Storm Chasers in June. In 27 games (25 starts) between the two clubs, he registered a combined 7–11 record and 4.13 ERA with 99 strikeouts in 128 2/3 innings pitched. In 2023, Parrish made 28 appearances (24 starts) split between Northwest Arkansas and Omaha, but struggled to a 7–8 record and 6.54 ERA with 96 strikeouts in 117.0 innings of work. On September 26, 2023, Parrish was released by the Royals organization.

=== Atlanta Braves ===
On November 10, 2023, Parrish signed a minor league contract with the Atlanta Braves. He split the 2024 campaign between the Double-A Mississippi Braves and Triple-A Gwinnett Stripers. In 29 games (18 starts) for the two affiliates, Parrish compiled a 7-5 record and 3.28 ERA with 113 strikeouts across 115 1/3 innings pitched. He elected free agency following the season on November 4, 2024.

=== Cincinnati Reds ===
On December 24, 2024, Parrish signed a minor league contract with the Cincinnati Reds. He made 29 appearances (nine starts) split between the Triple-A Louisville Bats and Double-A Chattanooga Lookouts in 2025, accumulating a 4-5 record and 4.37 ERA with 57 strikeouts over 70 innings of work. Parrish elected free agency following the season on November 6, 2025.

=== Dorados de Chihuahua ===
On April 14, 2026, Parrish signed with the Dorados de Chihuahua of the Mexican League. In five starts, he posted a 2-3 record with a 8.84 ERA, 15 strikeouts, and nine walks over 19 1/3 innings pitched. On May 19, Parrish was released by Chihuahua.

=== Tecolotes de los Dos Laredos ===
On May 27, 2026, Parrish signed with the Tecolotes de los Dos Laredos of the Mexican League.

Parrish was signed by the Navegantes del Magallanes for the 2026–27 Venezuelan Winter League season.
