= Mike Loynd =

American baseball player (born 1964)

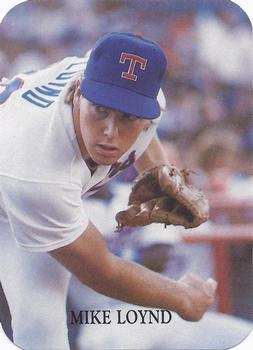
- Pitcher
- Born: March 26, 1964 (age 62); St. Louis, Missouri, U.S.
- Batted: Right Threw: Right

MLB debut
- July 24, 1986, for the Texas Rangers

Last MLB appearance
- October 1, 1987, for the Texas Rangers

MLB statistics
- Win–loss record: 3–7
- Earned run average: 5.82
- Strikeouts: 81
- Stats at Baseball Reference

Teams
- Texas Rangers (1986–1987)

Career highlights and awards
- Golden Spikes Award (1986)

Michael Wallace Loynd (born March 26, 1964) is an American former Major League Baseball pitcher for the Texas Rangers.

== College career ==
Michael Wallace was drafted in June 1986 out of Florida State University and made the jump from college to the big leagues in less than two months. At Florida State he tied an NCAA record by winning 20 games during the '86 season and was largely responsible for their trip to the College World Series. He was the 1986 Golden Spikes Award winner as the best college baseball player in the nation. After an initial flurry of success in the Majors, his career flamed out and he was demoted to the minor leagues. He had a career total of 3 wins, 7 losses, an ERA (Earned Run Average) of 5.82 with 81 strikeouts in 111 1/3 innings pitched.

== Professional career ==
Loynd, age 22, made his debut on Thursday, July 24, 1986. Like the much heralded David Clyde in 1973, Loynd was expected to contribute immediately upon being called to the Majors, as the Rangers were involved in a close pennant race, and manager Bobby Valentine was strapped for pitching. Loynd won his first start in front of 34,256 fans with a 6–3 win over future Hall of Famer Phil Niekro and the Cleveland Indians. Loynd threw for 6 innings, allowing 3 runs, walking 3 batters, and striking out 6 others.

After his next three starts resulted in no decisions, Loynd was back in the win column again on August 14, 1986, after defeating Teddy Higuera and the Milwaukee Brewers 8–2. Loynd surrendered only one run over 7 strong innings while giving up only 5 hits and one walk. He struck out 4 batters. The victory improved his undefeated record to 2-0 and moved the Rangers just 1.5 games behind the first place California Angels.

Afterwards, Loynd would begin to struggle. Many experts felt it was due to his not having pitched as many innings before during a season. Rangers' manager Bobby Valentine began to use him more selectively, but yet he struggled greatly and for the year ended with 2 wins, 2 losses, and an ERA of 5.36.

In 1987, he began the year in the bullpen and had some initial success in the first month. The Rangers, however, had been a team predicted by many pundits to contend for their first title. Instead, the club started the year 1-10 and never recovered. Perhaps the most iconic moment of that frustration involved Loynd in front of a hometown crowd at Arlington Stadium. On Saturday, May 9, 1987, Loynd was brought in relief of Edwin Correa against the Toronto Blue Jays. After Tony Fernández connected off him for a home run that pushed the score to 7–0, Loynd vented his anger by hitting the next batter, Lloyd Moseby, with a pitch. Moseby proceeded to charge the mound while Loynd ran away. Both were ejected from the game and Toronto ended up winning 15–4. Loynd concluded the 1987 season with 1 win, 5 losses, and an ERA of 6.10. It was his last time playing in the Major Leagues.

Loynd was traded from the Rangers to the Houston Astros for Robbie Wine during spring training on March 25, 1988. He spent the next seven seasons in the minor league organizations of the Astros, Toronto Blue Jays, St. Louis Cardinals, and Atlanta Braves before ending his career with the West Palm Beach Expos of the Florida State League in 1994. Loynd currently lives in St. Louis, Missouri with wife Lori.

== See also ==
- New Jersey Sports Writers Association § 1980–1989 awardees

== Sources ==
- Mike Loynd's career stats
- 1987 Texas Rangers media guide
