= James Tibbs III =

American baseball player (born 2002)

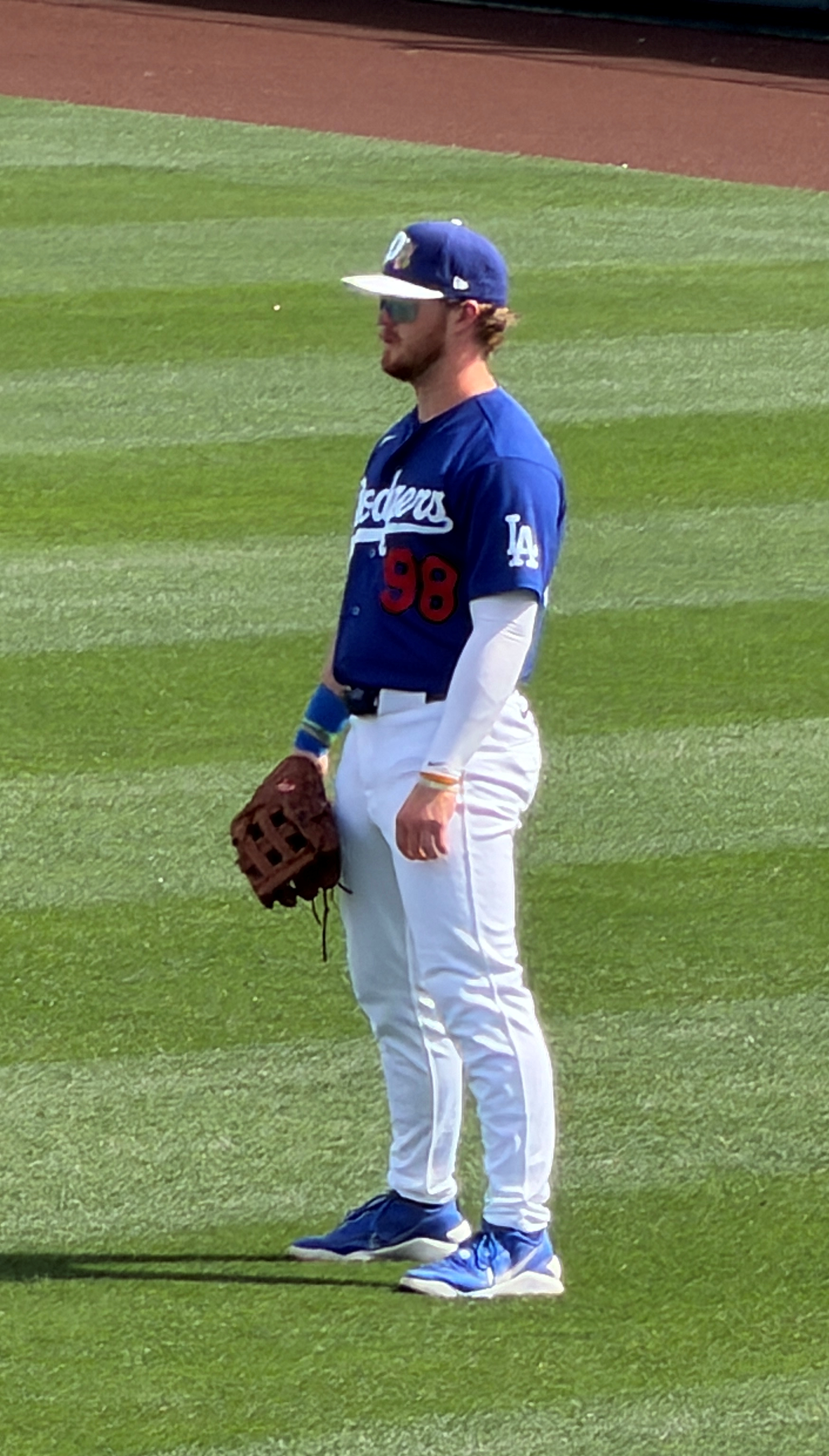
- Tibbs playing in a spring training game for the Dodgers in 2026

Los Angeles Dodgers
- Outfielder
- Born: October 1, 2002 (age 23); Atlanta, Georgia, U.S.
- Bats: Left Throws: Left
- Stats at Baseball Reference

James Eugene Tibbs III (born October 1, 2002) is an American professional baseball outfielder in the Los Angeles Dodgers organization.

== Amateur career ==
Tibbs attended Pope High School in Marietta, Georgia. He committed to Florida State University to play college baseball.

As a freshman at Florida State in 2022, Tibbs played in 56 games and hit .300/.411/.553 with 10 home runs and 32 runs batted in (RBI) over 170 at bats. As a sophomore, he started all 54 games and hit .339/.471/.682 with 17 home runs and 43 RBI over 195 at-bats. In 2023, he played collegiate summer baseball with the Brewster Whitecaps of the Cape Cod Baseball League, and was named a league all-star.

Tibbs entered his junior season in 2024 as a top prospect for the 2024 Major League Baseball draft. Over 66 games for Florida State in 2024, he hit .363 with 28 home runs and 95 RBI and was named Atlantic Coast Conference Baseball Player of the Year.

== Professional career ==
=== San Francisco Giants ===
Tibbs was drafted by San Francisco Giants with the 13th overall pick of the 2024 Major League Baseball draft. On July 24, 2024, Tibbs signed with the Giants on a $4.75 million contract.

Tibbs made his professional debut with the Low-A San Jose Giants before being promoted to the High-A Eugene Emeralds. Between the two affiliates in 2024, he had a slash line of .241/.293/.343 with two home runs and six RBI in 26 games.

Tibbs returned to Eugene to begin the 2025 season, and batted .246/.379/.478 with 12 home runs, 32 RBI, and three stolen bases across 57 appearances.

=== Boston Red Sox ===
On June 15, 2025, the Giants traded Tibbs to the Boston Red Sox, along with Kyle Harrison, Jordan Hicks, and Jose Bello, for Rafael Devers. He was assigned to the Double-A Portland Sea Dogs, where he batted .207 in 30 games.

=== Los Angeles Dodgers ===
On July 31, 2025, the Red Sox traded Tibbs and Zach Ehrhard to the Los Angeles Dodgers for Dustin May. The Dodgers sent him to the Tulsa Drillers, where he played in 36 games with a .269 batting average, seven home runs, and 32 RBI. He was promoted to the Triple-A Oklahoma City Comets to start 2026. He played in 141 games for the Comets, batting .287 and leading the Pacific Coast League in walks (108), extra-base hits (65) and total bases (278) while being second in home runs (30), RBI (107) and runs scored (109).
