= Alex Lodise =

American baseball player (born 2004)

Atlanta Braves – No. 74
- Shortstop
- Born: March 10, 2004 (age 22); Jacksonville, Florida, U.S.
- Bats: Right Throws: Right

Career highlights and awards
- Dick Howser Trophy (2025); ACC Player of the Year (2025)

Alex George Lodise (born March 10, 2004) is an American professional baseball shortstop in the Atlanta Braves organization.

== Amateur career ==
Lodise attended Bartram Trail High School in St. Johns, Florida. He committed to the University of North Florida to play college baseball.

As a freshman at North Florida in 2023, Lodise played started all 55 games and hit .306/.369/.607 with school freshman records 16 home runs and 63 runs batted in (RBI) over 219 at-bats. After the season, he entered the transfer portal and transferred to Florida State University. In his first season at Florida State in 2024, he started all 62 games, hitting .281/.363/.470 with nine home runs and 44 RBI over 217 at-bats, and played collegiate summer baseball with the Hyannis Harbor Hawks of the Cape Cod Baseball League.

Lodise returned to Florida State as the starting shortstop in 2025. In March against the Florida Gators, he hit a walk-off grand slam which also gave him the cycle. In April, Baseball America named him their Midseason Player of the Year.

Lodise was a top prospect for the 2025 Major League Baseball draft.

== Professional career ==
Lodise was drafted in the second round, with the 60th overall selection, in the 2025 Major League Baseball draft by the Atlanta Braves. He signed with Atlanta for a $1.3 million bonus on July 17, 2025.

== Personal life ==
Alex's cousin, Kyle, is a shortstop in the Chicago White Sox organization after being drafted in the 3rd round (76th overall) in the 2025 draft. Kyle attended Brunswick High School and played college baseball for the Augusta Jaguars and Georgia Tech Yellow Jackets. In 2025 with Georgia Tech, he was named a semifinalist for the Golden Spikes Award. Kyle's brother and Alex's cousin, Jordan, is also a shortstop who played his freshman season for the UCF Knights before transferring to Georgia Tech.
