= 2026 Florida State Seminoles baseball team =

American college baseball season

2026 Florida State Seminoles baseball

NCAA Tallahassee Regional, 2–2
- Conference: Atlantic Coast Conference

Ranking
- Coaches: No. 18
- D1Baseball.com: No. 18
- Record: 40–19 (19–11 ACC)
- Head coach: Link Jarrett (4th season)
- Assistant coaches: Ty Megahee (3rd season); Brad Vanderglas (3rd season); Drew Linder (2nd season)
- Pitching coach: Micah Posey (3rd season)
- Home stadium: Mike Martin Field at Dick Howser Stadium (Capacity: 6,700)

2026 Atlantic Coast Conference baseball standings
	Conf.						Overall
Team	W		L		T	PCT	W		L		T	PCT
No. 10 Georgia Tech ‍†‍‡‍^{y}	25	–	5	–	0	.833	50	–	11	–	0	.820
No. 2 North Carolina ‍‍‍^{y}	22	–	8	–	0	.733	54	–	14	–	1	.790
No. 18 Florida State ‍‍‍^{y}	19	–	11	–	0	.633	40	–	19	–	0	.678
Boston College ‍‍‍^{y}	17	–	13	–	0	.567	40	–	24	–	0	.625
Wake Forest ‍‍‍^{y}	16	–	14	–	0	.533	39	–	21	–	0	.650
Miami (FL) ‍‍‍^{y}	16	–	14	–	0	.533	39	–	20	–	0	.661
Virginia Tech ‍‍‍^{y}	15	–	15	–	0	.500	30	–	26	–	0	.536
Virginia ‍‍‍^{y}	14	–	16	–	0	.467	37	–	23	–	0	.617
NC State ‍‍‍^{y}	14	–	16	–	0	.467	32	–	24	–	0	.571
Louisville ‍‍‍	13	–	17	–	0	.433	30	–	27	–	0	.526
Notre Dame ‍‍‍	13	–	17	–	0	.433	31	–	22	–	0	.585
Stanford ‍‍‍	13	–	17	–	0	.433	28	–	26	–	0	.519
California ‍‍‍	12	–	18	–	0	.400	29	–	26	–	0	.527
Pittsburgh ‍‍‍	11	–	19	–	0	.367	33	–	24	–	0	.579
Clemson ‍‍‍	10	–	20	–	0	.333	31	–	26	–	0	.544
Duke ‍‍‍	10	–	20	–	0	.333	26	–	31	–	0	.456
† – Conference champion ‡ – Tournament champion y – Invited to the NCAA Tournament; As of June 23, 2026; Rankings from D1Baseball

The 2026 Florida State Seminoles baseball team represented Florida State University during the 2026 NCAA Division I baseball season. The Seminoles played their home games at Mike Martin Field at Dick Howser Stadium in Tallahassee, Florida. It was Link Jarrett's fourth season as head coach of the Seminoles. The team competed in the Atlantic Coast Conference.

== Previous season ==
Last season, under the leadership of Link Jarrett, the team went 42–16 overall, and 17–10 in ACC conference play. They opened the ACC tournament ranked 6th nationally, with a 14–7 defeat against the Duke Blue Devils in the first round. They would later lose to the North Carolina Tar Heels 7-3 during the second round.

The Seminoles were selected as regional hosts during the NCAA tournament, hosting the Tallahassee Regional at Dick Howser Stadium. This marked the 37th time in program history that Florida State hosted a regional and the program's 61st post-season appearance. Going into the NCAA Tournament, they were ranked the number 9 national seed. They won the Tallahassee Regional, ultimately advancing to the Corvallis Super Regional, where they lost to the Oregon State Beavers in three games.

== Preseason ==
=== Coaches poll ===
ACC coaches poll
Predicted finish	Team	Votes (1st place)
1	Georgia Tech	237 (7)
2	North Carolina	236 (6)
3	Florida State	221 (1)
4	Louisville	196
5	Clemson	185 (2)
6	NC State	169
7	Virginia	165
8	Miami	159
9	Wake Forest	145
10	Stanford	99
11	Virginia Tech	89
12	Notre Dame	87
13	Duke	67
14	Pittsburgh	45
15	California	41
16	Boston College	35

== Personnel ==
=== Starters ===
Lineup
Pos.	No.	Player.	Year
C	21	Nathan Cmeyla	RS Senior
1B	12	Myles Bailey	Sophomore
2B	26	Eli Putnam	RS Senior
3B	35	Will Bavaro	Freshman
SS	4	Cal Fisher	Junior
LF	1	Chase Williams	Junior
CF	16	Brayden Dowd	Junior
RF	9	John Stuetzer	Freshman
DH	15	Kelvyn Paulino Jr.	Freshman

Weekend pitching rotation
Day	No.	Player.	Year
Friday	7	Wes Mendes	Junior
Saturday	30	Bryson Moore	Junior
Sunday	3	Trey Beard	Junior

=== Roster ===
2026 Florida State Seminoles baseball team
Players
Coaches

#	Pos.	Name	B/T	Height	Weight	Year	Home town
1	OF	Chase Williams	S/R	5 ft 10 in (1.78 m)	176 lb (80 kg)	Jr	Elmore, AL
2	INF	Carter McCulley	R/R	6 ft 5 in (1.96 m)	201 lb (91 kg)	Sr	Pensacola, FL
3	LHP	Trey Beard	L/L	6 ft 2 in (1.88 m)	185 lb (84 kg)	Jr	Dunedin, FL
4	INF	Cal Fisher	R/R	6 ft 0 in (1.83 m)	197 lb (89 kg)	Jr	Deerfield, WI
5	INF	Gabe Fraser	L/R	6 ft 2 in (1.88 m)	190 lb (86 kg)	So	Huntington Beach, CA
7	LHP	Wes Mendes	L/L	6 ft 1 in (1.85 m)	195 lb (88 kg)	Jr	Tampa, FL
9	OF	John Stuetzer	R/R	5 ft 11 in (1.8 m)	200 lb (91 kg)	Fr	Marietta, GA
12	INF	Myles Bailey	L/R	6 ft 4 in (1.93 m)	255 lb (116 kg)	So	Tallahassee, FL
13	INF	Noah Sheffield	R/R	6 ft 1 in (1.85 m)	199 lb (90 kg)	So	Tampa, FL
15	INF	Kelvyn Paulino Jr.	R/R	6 ft 1 in (1.85 m)	182 lb (83 kg)	Fr	Thomasville, NC
16	OF	Brayden Dowd	L/L	5 ft 10 in (1.78 m)	183 lb (83 kg)	Jr	Clarkston, MI
17	UTL	Charlie Buckles	L/L	6 ft 6 in (1.98 m)	230 lb (104 kg)	Fr	Bethesda, MD
18	UTL	Manny Lantigua	S/R	6 ft 0 in (1.83 m)	197 lb (89 kg)	Fr	Delrey Beach, FL
19	RHP	John Abraham	R/R	6 ft 3 in (1.91 m)	212 lb (96 kg)	Jr	Tampa, FL
20	INF	Jace Estes	L/R	5 ft 9 in (1.75 m)	175 lb (79 kg)	So	Crawfordville, FL
21	C	Nathan Cmeyla	R/R	5 ft 11 in (1.8 m)	190 lb (86 kg)	RS Sr	Ashburn, VA
23	OF	Brody DeLamielleure	R/R	6 ft 1 in (1.85 m)	190 lb (86 kg)	RS So	St. Augustine, FL
24	RHP	Cole Stokes	R/R	6 ft 6 in (1.98 m)	229 lb (104 kg)	Jr	Redondo Beach, CA
25	C	Hunter Carns	R/R	6 ft 0 in (1.83 m)	200 lb (91 kg)	So	Jacksonville, FL
26	INF	Eli Putnam	R/R	6 ft 4 in (1.93 m)	215 lb (98 kg)	RS Sr	Cabin John, MD
27	LHP	Kevin Mebil	L/L	6 ft 0 in (1.83 m)	202 lb (92 kg)	RS Jr	West Palm Beach, FL
28	LHP	Jacob Marlowe	L/L	6 ft 0 in (1.83 m)	192 lb (87 kg)	RS Sr	Naples, FL
30	RHP	Bryson Moore	R/R	6 ft 3 in (1.91 m)	223 lb (101 kg)	Jr	Fairfax, VA
31	RHP	Braxton Varnes	R/R	6 ft 3 in (1.91 m)	210 lb (95 kg)	Fr	Santa Rosa Beach, FL
32	LHP	Cooper Whited	L/L	6 ft 1 in (1.85 m)	199 lb (90 kg)	Jr	Jacksonville, FL
33	RHP	Ben Barrett	R/R	6 ft 4 in (1.93 m)	220 lb (100 kg)	Sr	Orlando, FL
35	INF	Will Bavaro	R/R	6 ft 2 in (1.88 m)	197 lb (89 kg)	Fr	Lake Worth, FL
36	C	Mookie Rodriguez	L/R	5 ft 11 in (1.8 m)	190 lb (86 kg)	Fr	Dover, FL
38	OF	Clancy Marsh	R/R	6 ft 0 in (1.83 m)	165 lb (75 kg)	Sr	Boca Raton, FL
40	RHP	Brodie Purcell	R/R	6 ft 3 in (1.91 m)	215 lb (98 kg)	Jr	Aliso Viejo, CA
41	RHP	Chris Knier	R/R	5 ft 11 in (1.8 m)	195 lb (88 kg)	Jr	Jensen Beach, FL
42	RHP	Jake Echols	R/R	6 ft 4 in (1.93 m)	185 lb (84 kg)	Jr	Orlando, FL
45	RHP	Cade O'Leary	R/R	6 ft 4 in (1.93 m)	197 lb (89 kg)	So	Nashville, TN
47	RHP	Rhett Vaughn	R/R	6 ft 3 in (1.91 m)	235 lb (107 kg)	RS Fr	Sebring, FL
48	RHP	Gabe Nard	R/R	5 ft 11 in (1.8 m)	188 lb (85 kg)	Sr	Shaker Heights, OH
50	C	Kaden Frommelt	R/R	5 ft 11 in (1.8 m)	214 lb (97 kg)	Jr	Marion, IA
53	RHP	Cam Odom	R/R	6 ft 0 in (1.83 m)	219 lb (99 kg)	Fr	Cottondale, FL
55	LHP	Payton Manca	L/L	6 ft 6 in (1.98 m)	256 lb (116 kg)	RS So	Winchendon, MA

Head coach

Link Jarrett

Assistant coach(es)

Ty Megahee
Brad Vanderglas
Drew Linder
Micah Posey

Legend

- (C) Team captain
- (S) Suspended
- (I) Ineligible
- Injured
- Current redshirt

Roster
Last update: March 30, 2026

== Game log ==
2026 Florida State Seminoles baseball game log (40–19)
Regular season (38–16)

February (7–2)
Date	TV	Opponent	Rank	Stadium	Score	Win	Loss	Save	Attendance	Overall	ACC	Source
February 13	ACCNX	James Madison*	No. 16	Dick Howser Stadium; Tallahassee, FL	**W** 5–1	**Mendes** (1–0)	Polley (0–1)	**Purcell** (1)	6,700	1–0	—	Report
February 14	ACCNX	James Madison*	No. 16	Dick Howser Stadium	**W** 16–5^{7}	**O'Leary** (1–0)	Muscar (0–1)	None	6,577	2–0	—	Report
February 15	ACCNX	James Madison*	No. 16	Dick Howser Stadium	**Canceled (inclement weather)**							
February 17	ESPN+	at Jacksonville*	No. 16	John Sessions Stadium; Jacksonville, FL	**W** 13–3^{8}	**Manca** (1–0)	Baker-Liv (0–1)	None	1,500	3–0	–	Report
Amegy Bank College Baseball Series
February 20	FloSports	vs. Michigan*	No. 16	Globe Life Field; Arlington, TX	**W** 6–1	**Mendes** (2–0)	Carey (0–1)	None	3,219	4–0	—	Report
February 21	FloSports	vs. No. 9 Auburn*	No. 16	Globe Life Field	**L** 5–8	Sanders (1–0)	**O'Leary** (1–1)	Hetzler (1)	3,702	4–1	—	Report
February 22	FloSports	vs. Nebraska*	No. 16	Globe Life Field	**L** 1–10	Blachowicz (1–0)	**Manca** (1–1)	None	3,374	4–2	—	Report
February 25	ACCNX	North Florida*	No. 21	Dick Howser Stadium	**W** 14–9	**Manca** (2–1)	Groom (0–1)	None	4,145	5–2	—	Report
February 27	ACCNX	The Citadel*	No. 21	Dick Howser Stadium	**W** 6–2	**Mendes** (3–0)	Holmes (1–2)	**Abraham** (1)	5,875	6–2	—	Report
February 28	ACCNX	The Citadel*	No. 21	Dick Howser Stadium	**W** 2–1^{10}	**Mebil** (1–0)	Brash (1–1)	None	6,214	7–2	—	Report

March (15–4)
Date	TV	Opponent	Rank	Stadium	Score	Win	Loss	Save	Attendance	Overall	ACC	Source
March 1	ACCNX	The Citadel*	No. 21	Dick Howser Stadium	**W** 2–0	**Moore** (1–0)	Bowers (0–1)	**Knier** (1)	4,627	8–2	—	Report
March 3	ACCNX	Jacksonville*	No. 20	Dick Howser Stadium	**W** 7–6	**Abraham** (1–0)	Williamson (1–1)	None	5,039	9–2	—	Report
March 4	ACCNX	Mercer*	No. 20	Dick Howser Stadium	**W** 22–5^{7}	**Whited** (1–0)	Decker (0–1)	None	4,437	10–2	—	Report
March 6	ACCNX	Northern Kentucky*	No. 20	Dick Howser Stadium	**W** 7–3	**Mendes** (4–0)	Wilson (0–1)	**Knier** (2)	5,178	11–2	—	Report
March 7	ACCNX	Northern Kentucky*	No. 20	Dick Howser Stadium	**W** 13–3^{7}	**Beard** (1–0)	Miramontes (0–2)	None	5,578	12–2	—	Report
March 8	ACCNX	Northern Kentucky*	No. 20	Dick Howser Stadium	**W** 17–3^{7}	**Moore** (2–0)	Green (0–1)	None	4,766	13–2	—	Report
Sunshine Showdown
March 10	SECN+	at No. 23 Florida*	No. 20	Condron Ballpark; Gainesville, FL	**L** 3–6	McNeillie (2–0)	**Mebil** (1–1)	Whritenour (2)	6,548	13–3	—	Report
March 13	ACCNX	at No. 12 Wake Forest	No. 20	David F. Couch Ballpark; Winston-Salem, NC	**W** 10–0^{7}	**Mendes** (5–0)	Morningstar (2–2)	None	2,348	14–3	1–0	Report
March 14	ACCNX	at No. 12 Wake Forest	No. 20	David F. Couch Ballpark	**W** 2–0	**Beard** (2–0)	Levonas (4–1)	**Abraham** (2)	3,067	15–3	2–0	Report
March 15	ACCN	at No. 12 Wake Forest	No. 20	David F. Couch Ballpark	**W** 12–6	**Moore** (3–0)	Marsten (0–1)	None	2,495	16–3	3–0	Report
March 17	ACCNX	Bethune–Cookman*	No. 11	Dick Howser Stadium		**Purcell** (1–0)	Benedict (1–2)	None	4,419	17–3	—	Report
March 20	ACCNX	No. 10 NC State	No. 11	Dick Howser Stadium	**L** 4–6	Marohn (4–0)	**Mendes** (5–1)	Nance (1)	5,146	17–4	3–1	Report
March 21	ACCNX	No. 10 NC State	No. 11	Dick Howser Stadium	**W** 11–5	**Knier** (1–0)	Dudan (4–1)	**Purcell** (2)	5,004	18–4	4–1	Report
March 22	ACCNX	No. 10 NC State	No. 11	Dick Howser Stadium	**W** 15–5^{7}	**Moore** (4–0)	Andrews (2–1)	None	4,689	19–4	5–1	Report
Sunshine Showdown
March 24	SECN+	vs. No. 18 Florida*	No. 10	VyStar Ballpark; Jacksonville, FL	**L** 0–5	Sandefer (1–1)	**Whited** (1–1)	Barberi (2)	7,667	19–5	—	Report
March 27	ACCNX	Duke	No. 10	Dick Howser Stadium	**W** 3–1	**Mendes** (6–1)	Weaver (4–3)	Abraham (3)	6,700	20–5	6–1	Report
March 28	ACCN	Duke	No. 10	Dick Howser Stadium	**W** 12–11	**Knier** (2–0)	Anderson (1–1)	**Nard** (1)	6,700	21–5	7–1	Report
March 29	ACCNX	Duke	No. 10	Dick Howser Stadium	**L** 4–11	Leon (2–1)	**Moore** (4–1)	None	5,542	21–6	7–2	Report
March 31	ESPN+	at Stetson*	No. 7	Melching Field; DeLand, FL	**W** 6–3	**Purcell** (2–0)	Moran (0–2)	**Nard** (2)	2,459	22–6	—	Report

April (8–8)
Date	TV	Opponent	Rank	Stadium	Score	Win	Loss	Save	Attendance	Overall	ACC	Source
April 2	ACCN	at No. 10 Virginia	No. 7	Davenport Field; Charlottesville, VA	**L** 3–4	Zatkowski (5–0)	**Mendes** (6–2)	Kapa (7)	4,341	22–7	7–3	Report
April 3	ACCNX	at No. 10 Virginia	No. 7	Davenport Field	**W** 5–2	**Beard** (3–0)	Stammel (2–3)	**Abraham** (4)	5,141	23–7	8–3	Report
April 4	ACCNX	at No. 10 Virginia	No. 7	Davenport Field	**W** 9–3	**Moore** (5–1)	Paone (1–2)	None	4,707	24–7	9–3	Report
Sunshine Showdown
April 7	ESPN2	Florida*	No. 5	Dick Howser Stadium	**L** 3–4	McDonald (3–0)	**Whited** (1–2)	Whritenour (6)	6,700	24–8	—	Report
April 9	ACCN	at No. 3 Georgia Tech	No. 5	Russ Chandler Stadium; Atlanta, GA	**L** 3–4	McKee (6–0)	**Abraham** (1–1)	Patel (3)	4,045	24–9	9–4	Report
April 10	ACCN	at No. 3 Georgia Tech	No. 5	Russ Chandler Stadium	**L** 3–8	Gaudette (3–0)	**Beard** (3–1)	Loy (1)	4,214	24–10	9–5	Report
April 11	ACCNX	at No. 3 Georgia Tech	No. 5	Russ Chandler Stadium	**L** 3–17^{7}	Blakely (3–0)	**Stokes** (0–1)	None	4,326	24–11	9–6	Report
April 14	ACCNX	Stetson*	No. 8	Dick Howser Stadium	**W** 9–2	**Whited** (2–2)	Phillips (2–4)	None	5,050	25–11	—	Report
April 17	ACCNX	Notre Dame	No. 8	Dick Howser Stadium	**W** 11–0^{7}	**Mendes** (7–2)	Hirsch (2–3)	None	5,751	26–11	10–6	Report
April 18	ACCNX	Notre Dame	No. 8	Dick Howser Stadium	**W** 9–7	**Beard** (4–1)	Radel (4–2)	**Abraham** (5)	6,293	27–11	11–6	Report
April 19	ACCNX	Notre Dame	No. 8	Dick Howser Stadium	**W** 6–4	**Purcell** (3–0)	Rooney (1–3)	**Knier** (3)	5,115	28–11	12–6	Report
April 21	ESPN+	at North Florida*	No. 8	Dusty Rhoades Field; Jacksonville, FL	**W** 4–1	**Lantigua** (1–0)	Hendry (1–4)	**Knier** (4)	1,577	29–11	—	Report
April 24	ACCNX	at Stanford	No. 8	Klein Field; Palo Alto, CA	**L** 3–4	Warner (1–2)	**Mendes** (7–3)	Moore (3)	1,252	29–12	12–7	Report
April 25	ACCNX	at Stanford	No. 8	Klein Field	**L** 7–8^{11}	Ketelsen (2–1)	**Stokes** (0–2)	None	1,602	29–13	12–8	Report
April 26	ACCNX	at Stanford	No. 8	Klein Field	**L** 4–7	Ketelsen (3–1)	**Purcell** (3–1)	None	1,478	29–14	12–9	Report
April 29	ACCNX	South Florida*	No. 14	Dick Howser Stadium	**W** 9–1	**Whited** (3–2)	Allen (0–2)	None	4,630	30–14	—	Report

May (8–2)
Date	TV	Opponent	Rank	Stadium	Score	Win	Loss	Save	Attendance	Overall	ACC	Source
May 2 (DH)	ACCNX	Pitt	No. 14	Dick Howser Stadium	**W** 10–1	**Mendes** (8–3)	Doganiero (5–3)	None	4,599	31–14	13–9	Report
May 2 (DH)	ACCNX	Pitt	No. 14	Dick Howser Stadium	**W** 8–5	**Beard** (5–1)	Kriebel (2–2)	**Abraham** (6)	4,599	32–14	14–9	Report
May 3	ACCNX	Pitt	No. 14	Dick Howser Stadium	**W** 6–4	**Knier** (3–0)	Leslie (2–4)	None	4,412	33–14	15–9	Report
May 5	ACCNX	Jacksonville*	No. 14	Dick Howser Stadium	**W** 5–2	**Stokes** (1–2)	Scott (0–1)	**Mebil** (1)	4,328	34–14	—	Report
May 8	ACCNX	at Clemson	No. 14	Doug Kingsmore Stadium; Clemson, SC	**W** 8–4	**Mendes** (9–3)	Moehler (0–2)	**Manca** (1)	5,051	35–14	16–9	Report
May 9	ACCN	at Clemson	No. 14	Doug Kingsmore Stadium	**L** 3–4	Nelson (2–3)	**Mebil** (1–2)	Simmerson (4)	5,036	35–15	16–10	Report
May 10	ESPN2	at Clemson	No. 14	Doug Kingsmore Stadium	**W** 6–3	**Moore** (6–1)	Knaak (2–6)	**Purcell** (3)	4,877	36–15	17–10	Report
May 14	ACCNX	Miami (FL)	No. 11	Dick Howser Stadium	**W** 7–6^{11}	**Knier** (4–0)	Bilka (2–2)	None	5,263	37–15	18–10	Report
May 15	ACCNX	Miami (FL)	No. 11	Dick Howser Stadium	**W** 11–1^{8}	**Beard** (6–1)	Collera (3–3)	None	5,772	38–15	19–10	Report
May 16	ACCNX	Miami (FL)	No. 11	Dick Howser Stadium	**L** 4–7	Ciscar (5–3)	**Moore** (6–2)	Glidewell (5)	5,620	38–16	19–11	Report

Postseason (2–3)

ACC tournament (0–1)
Date	TV	Opponent	Rank	Stadium	Score	Win	Loss	Save	Attendance	Overall	ACCT Record	Source
May 22	ACCN	vs. (14) Pitt; Quarterfinals	(3); No. 11	Truist Field; Charlotte, NC	**L** 6–8	Leslie (4–5)	**Purcell** (3–2)	None	4,464	38–17	0–1	Report

NCAA tournament (2–2)
Date	TV	Opponent	Rank	Stadium	Score	Win	Loss	Save	Attendance	Overall	NCAAT Record	Source
May 29	ACCN	St. John's; Tallahassee Regional	(10); No. 12	Dick Howser Stadium	**L** 5–6	Hoeckele (3–0)	**Abraham** (1–2)	None	4,081	38–18	0–1	Report
May 30/31	ACCN	Coastal Carolina; Tallahassee Regional	(10); No. 12	Dick Howser Stadium	**W** 2–1	**Purcell** (4–2)	Horn (7–2)	**Beard** (1)	4,071	39–18	1–1	Report
May 31	ESPN+	Northern Illinois; Tallahassee Regional	(10); No. 12	Dick Howser Stadium	**W** 7–4^{10}	**Purcell** (5–2)	Cihocki (7–3)	None	4,192	40–18	2–1	Report
June 1	ESPNU	St. John's; Tallahassee Regional	(10); No. 12	Dick Howser Stadium	**L** 4–5	Hoeckele (4–0)	**Abraham** (1–3)	Frederick (6)	3,937	40–19	2–2	Report

Legend: = Win = Loss = Canceled
Bold = Florida State team member * Non-conference game
Rankings are based on the team's current ranking in the D1Baseball poll.

== Rankings ==
Ranking movements Legend: ██ Increase in ranking ██ Decrease in ranking
	Week																	
Poll	Pre	1	2	3	4	5	6	7	8	9	10	11	12	13	14	15	16	Final
Coaches'	14	14*	17	15	15	9	8	7	6	10	8	12	12	8	8	9	9*	18
Baseball America	12	12	17	18	17	10	10	6	5	13	11	17	15	11	11	11*	11*	19
NCBWA†	14	11	17	15	15	10	8	7	6	9	7	13	13	10	10	10*	21	20
D1Baseball	16	16	21	20	20	11	10	7	5	8	8	14	14	11	11	12	12*	18
Perfect Game	9	9	15	16	15	11	10	6	5	12	8	16	14	8	7	7*	7*	21

† NCBWA ranks 30 teams in their preseason poll, but only ranks 25 teams weekly during the season.
* A new poll was not released for this week, so for comparison purposes, the previous week's ranking is inserted in this week's slot.

== Honors ==
=== Watchlists ===
Player	Watchlist	Ref.
Trey Beard; Wes Mendes; Myles Bailey	Golden Spikes Award watchlist	
Hunter Carns	Buster Posey Award watchlist	
Wes Mendes	National Pitcher of the Year watchlist	
John Abraham	Stopper of the Year Mid-season watchlist	

=== Awards ===
Player	Watchlist	Ref.
Trey Beard	ACC Pitcher of the Week; Golden Spikes Player of the Week; Third Team All-ACC; Pre-season All-American	
Myles Bailey	ACC Player of the Week; Pre-season All-American; First Team Mid-season All-American	
Wes Mendes	ACC Pitcher of the Year; ACC Pitcher of the Week; National Pitcher of the Year semifinalist Dick Howser Trophy semifinalis First Team All-American; Second Team All-American; Third Team All-American; First Team All-ACC; Southeast All-Region First Team; First Team Mid-season All-American; Second Team Mid-season All-American	
Bryson Moore	ACC Pitcher of the Week; Southeast All-Region Second Team	
John Abraham	Stopper of the Year finalist First Team All-American; Second Team All-American; Third Team All-ACC; Southeast All-Region First Team; First Team Mid-season All-American	
Kelvyn Paulino, Jr.	First Team Mid-season All-American	
Brayden Dowd	Third Team All-ACC	
John Stuetzer	All-ACC Freshman Team	

== MLB draft ==
Player	Position	Round	Overall	Team	Ref.
Wes Mendes	P	2	57	Houston Astros	
Myles Bailey	IF	2	75	Chicago Cubs	
Brayden Dowd	CF	3	88	Arizona Diamondbacks	
Trey Beard	P	5	147	Miami Marlins	
Bryson Moore	p	7	198	Pittsburgh Pirates	
Cole Stokes	P	12	353	Tampa Bay Rays	
Brodie Purcell	P	12	362	Cincinnati Reds	
