= Atlantic Coast Conference Player of the Year =

Atlantic Coast Conference Player of the Year refers to the most outstanding player for the Atlantic Coast Conference (ACC) in a given sport for a given season.

For lists of individual sport ACC Players of the Year by year:

- Atlantic Coast Conference Baseball Player of the Year
- Atlantic Coast Conference Baseball Pitcher of the Year
- Atlantic Coast Conference Men's Basketball Player of the Year
- Atlantic Coast Conference Women's Basketball Player of the Year
- Atlantic Coast Conference Men's Soccer Player of the Year
- Atlantic Coast Conference Women's Soccer Player of the Year

Additionally, ACC players of the year in football can be found at:

- Atlantic Coast Conference football individual awards
