= Garnett Bruce =

American director

Garnett Bruce (born 1967) is an American opera director.

Bruce began his training as a choirboy at the Washington National Cathedral while he attended St. Albans School (Washington, DC). After earning a Bachelor of Arts in English and Drama from Tufts University, he went on to hold prestigious internships with Harold Prince for his 1990 production of Faust at the Metropolitan Opera and with Leonard Bernstein for his performances and recordings of Candide.

In recent years, Bruce has served on the directing staffs of Santa Fe Opera, Dallas Opera, Houston Grand Opera, San Diego Opera, Washington National Opera, and San Francisco Opera. He has worked under such directors as Francesca Zambello, Bruce Beresford, John Copley, Lofti Mansouri, John Cox, Stephen Lawless, and Nathaniel Merrill, and he been responsible for reviving many of their productions. In 2006, he made his debut at the Lyric Opera of Chicago directing the opening night production of Turandot. Bruce has also created several original productions of operas, including Rossini's La Cenerentola, Mozart's La clemenza di Tito, and Gluck's Orfeo ed Euridice.

Bruce also currently serves as resident director at the Peabody Conservatory of Music, and sits on the Board of Directors for FBN Productions.
