= Danny Hultzen =

American baseball player (born 1989)

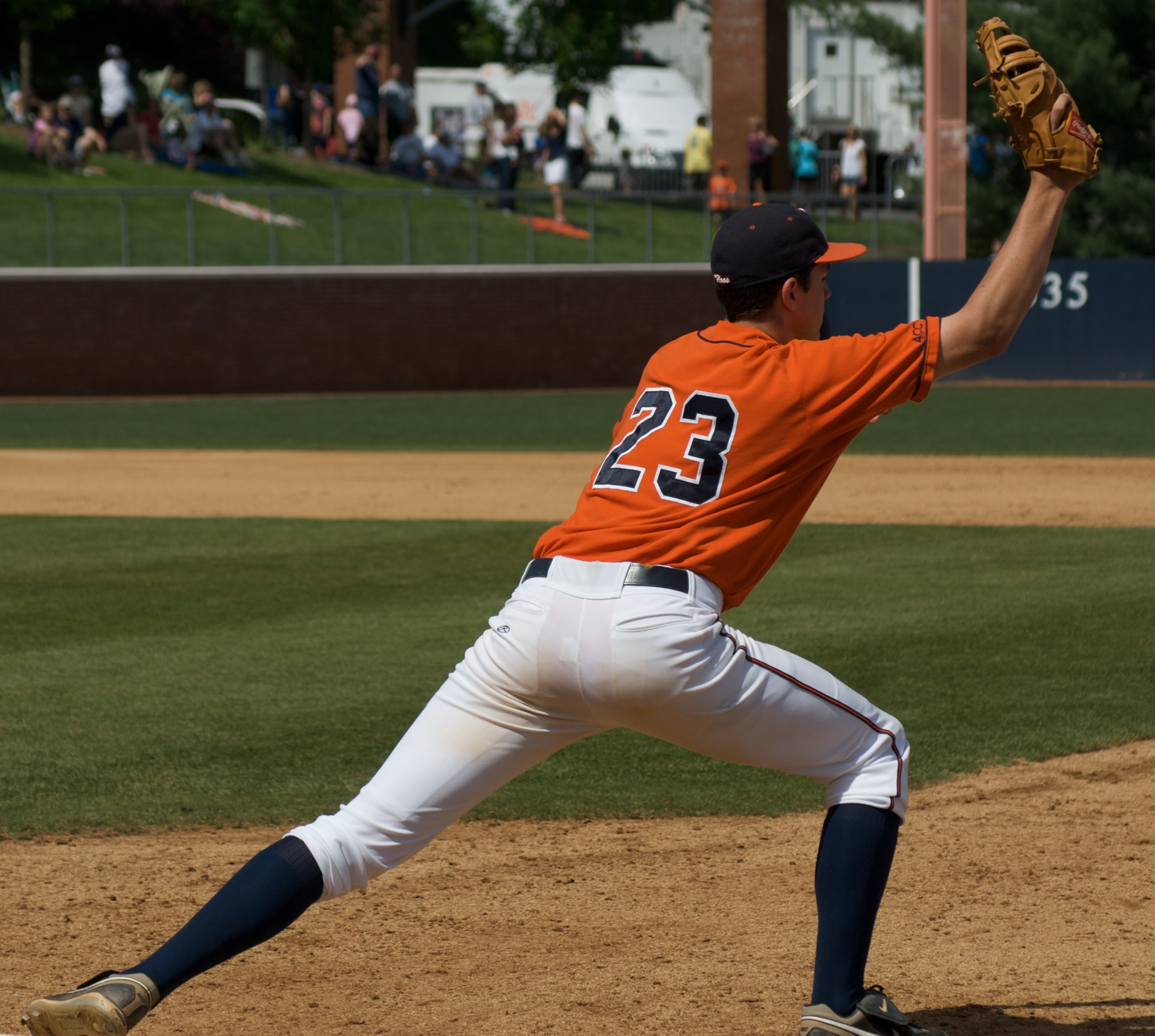
- Hultzen at Virginia in 2009
- Pitcher
- Born: November 28, 1989 (age 36); Bethesda, Maryland, U.S.
- Batted: Left Threw: Left

MLB debut
- September 8, 2019, for the Chicago Cubs

Last MLB appearance
- September 24, 2019, for the Chicago Cubs

MLB statistics
- Win–loss record: 0–0
- Earned run average: 0.00
- Strikeouts: 5
- Stats at Baseball Reference

Teams
- As player: Chicago Cubs (2019); As coach: Chicago Cubs (2023–2024)

Daniel Alexander Hultzen (born November 28, 1989) is an American former professional baseball pitcher. He played in Major League Baseball (MLB) for the Chicago Cubs in 2019. Hultzen attended the University of Virginia, where he starred for the Virginia Cavaliers baseball team. He was drafted and selected second overall by the Seattle Mariners in the 2011 MLB draft. Hultzen pitched a scoreless inning for the Cubs in his major league debut against Milwaukee on September 8, 2019.

== High school career ==
Hultzen attended St. Albans School in Washington, D.C. starting in seventh grade. There he was named First-Team All-American by Baseball America. Hultzen was drafted to the Arizona Diamondbacks in the 10th round of the 2008 MLB draft. However, Hultzen didn't sign, opting to attend college.

== College career ==
Hultzen enrolled at the University of Virginia, where he played college baseball for the Virginia Cavaliers baseball team in the Atlantic Coast Conference (ACC). In 2009, Hultzen won ACC Freshman of the Year for baseball and was named First-Team All-ACC. He was also named to the ACC Academic Honor Roll and All-ACC Baseball Team.

In 2010, Hultzen was named ACC Pitcher of the Year. He is the first Virginia Cavalier to win the award. He was also named First-Team All-ACC a second time. Over the 2010 season, Hultzen finished with a 10–3 record and an ERA of 1.59 in 96 1/3 innings. In 2011, Hultzen won the John Olerud Award, awarded annually by the College Baseball Foundation to the best two-way player of the season.

== Professional career ==
=== Seattle Mariners ===
On June 6, 2011, Hultzen was the second player selected in the 2011 Major League Baseball draft, taken by the Seattle Mariners. Hultzen signed a contract with Seattle on August 15. The deal was worth a minimum of $8.5 million over five-years, with a $6.35 million signing bonus. He made his professional debut in 2012 with the Jackson Generals and was promoted to the Tacoma Rainiers in June. In 25 total starts between the two clubs, he was 9–7 with a 3.05 ERA. He was named to appear in the 2012 All-Star Futures Game.

Hultzen missed the majority of the 2013 season due to a shoulder injury. After the 2013 season, he underwent surgery to repair a torn labrum and rotator cuff in his shoulder, and missed the entire 2014 season. He played in only three games in 2015 due to injury. In 2016, while rehabbing with the AZL Mariners, he suffered recurring problems and underwent another surgery. Hultzen elected free agency following the season on November 7, 2016.

Hultzen sat out the 2017 season while finishing his university degree.

=== Chicago Cubs ===
On March 1, 2018, Hultzen signed a minor league contract with the Chicago Cubs organization. He was assigned to the Triple–A Iowa Cubs to start the 2019 season.

Hultzen allowed zero runs in his major league debut on September 8, 2019. He pitched the seventh inning for the Cubs against the Milwaukee Brewers. After issuing a hit batsman and a single, he struck out the side. On December 2, Hultzen was non-tendered by Chicago and became a free agent.

On January 22, 2020, Hultzen re-signed with the Cubs on a minor league deal. Hultzen did not play in a game in 2020 due to the cancellation of the minor league season because of the COVID-19 pandemic. He became a free agent on November 2.

== Coaching career ==
On January 14, 2021, Hultzen announced his retirement, and joined the Chicago Cubs front office as a pitching development assistant under Assistant General Manager and Vice President of Pitching Craig Breslow.

== Scouting report ==
Hultzen was considered one of the most polished prospects in the 2011 draft class due to the excellent command he had over his pitches.

In addition to his pitching, Hultzen was considered an excellent position player, although it was unlikely he would ever have been developed as a position prospect.

His main pitch was a four-seam fastball at 91–94 mph. He also had a two-seam fastball with similar velocity. His off-speed pitches were a slider and vulcan changeup in the low 80s.

Hultzen struggled with his control in AAA in 2012, walking 43 hitters in 48 2/3 innings. Addressing those concerns, Hultzen said, "You need to learn how to fail in this game ... I haven't faced a lot of failure as a pitcher. You need to learn how to cope with it, and I think I have. Hopefully most of it is behind me."
