= Link Jarrett =

American college baseball coach

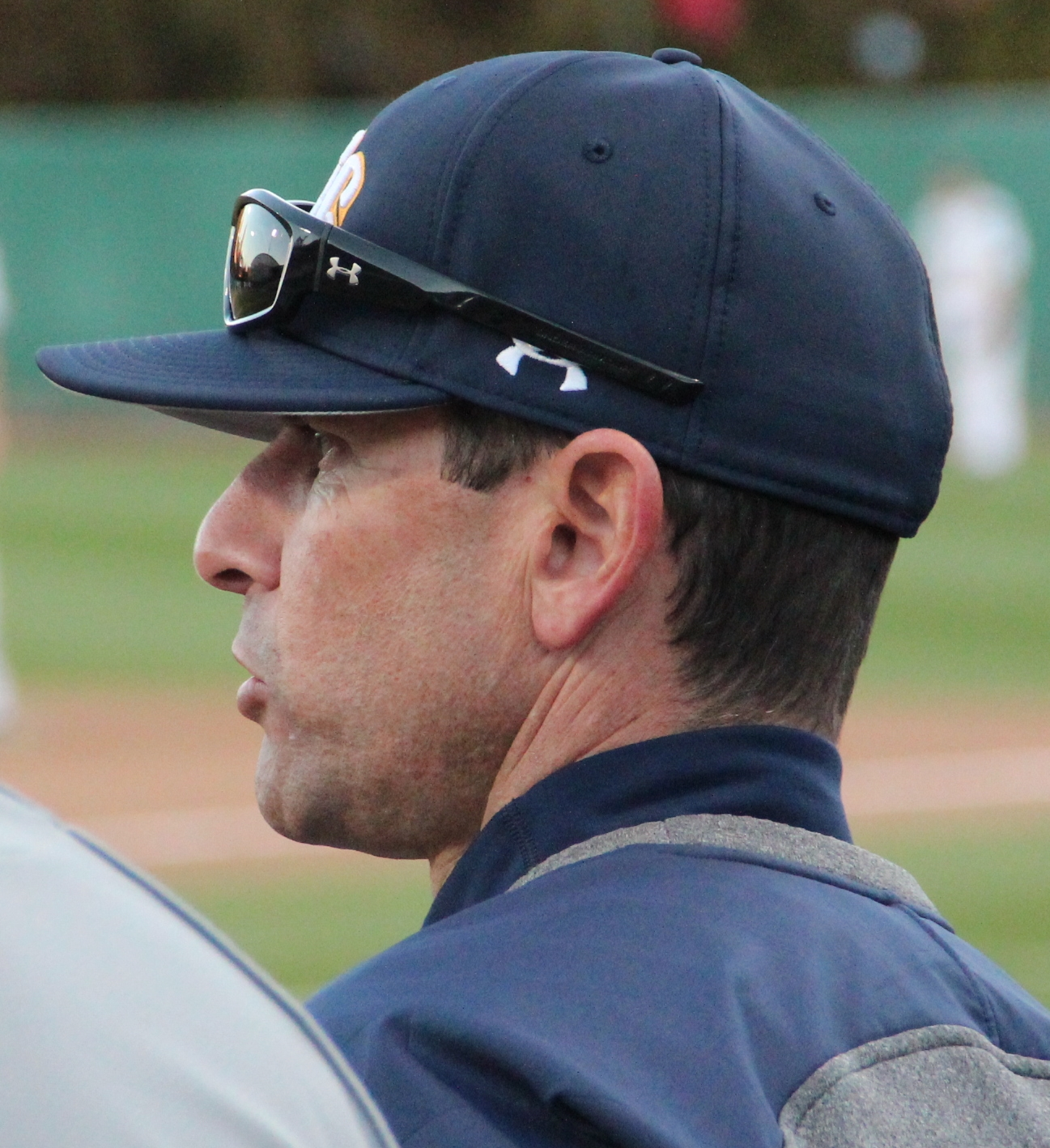
- Jarrett coaching in 2014

Current position
- Title: Head coach
- Team: Florida State
- Conference: ACC
- Record: 154–83 (.650)

Biographical details
- Born: January 26, 1972 (age 54); Tallahassee, Florida, U.S.

Playing career
- 1991–1994: Florida State
- Position: SS

Coaching career (HC unless noted)
- 1999–2001: Flagler (Asst.)
- 2003: Florida State (Asst.)
- 2004–2005: Mercer (Asst.)
- 2006–2009: East Carolina (Asst.)
- 2010–2012: Auburn (Asst.)
- 2013–2019: UNC Greensboro
- 2020–2022: Notre Dame
- 2023–present: Florida State

Head coaching record
- Overall: 455–281 (.618)

Accomplishments and honors

Championships
- Southern Conference Tournament (2017); Southern Conference Regular Season (2018); ACC Atlantic Division (2021)

Awards
- C-USA Assistant Coach of the Year (2009); SEC Assistant Coach of the Year (2010); Southern Conference Coach of the Year (2016, 2018); ACC Coach of the Year (2021)

Lincoln Roscoe Jarrett (born January 26, 1972) is an American college baseball coach and former shortstop, who is the current head coach of the Florida State Seminoles. Jarrett played college baseball at Florida State University from 1991 to 1994 for coach Mike Martin. He was the head coach at the University of North Carolina at Greensboro from 2013 to 2019 and the University of Notre Dame from 2020 to 2022.

== Playing career ==
Jarrett was a four-year starter at shortstop for the Florida State Seminoles, appearing in three College World Series. He holds the All-Time NCAA Assists record of 802. He was an NCBWA All-American in 1993 and 1994, and also earned All-ACC honors. In 1993, he played collegiate summer baseball with the Yarmouth–Dennis Red Sox of the Cape Cod Baseball League. Jarrett graduated holding the Seminole records for consecutive games, at bats, and assists. He was drafted in the 22nd round of the 1994 MLB draft by the Colorado Rockies. He played five years in the Rockies organization, reaching the class-AA New Haven Ravens before turning to coaching. Jarrett hit .303 for New Haven in 1997, and was named "Most Spectacular Defensive Player" following the 1994 season in Bend, Oregon.

== Coaching career ==
Jarrett began his coaching career in 1999 as an assistant at Flagler, where he remained for three seasons. The Saints set several school records during his tenure, and won 40 games in 2001. He returned to Florida State in 2003, helping the Seminoles to 53 wins, an ACC regular season championship, and a super regional berth.

In 2004 and 2005, Jarrett served as recruiting coordinator at Mercer. After seeing the Bears double their win total from his first season to his second and earn their first winning season since 1999, Jarrett accepted the same position at East Carolina.

In Jarrett's four seasons, the Pirates made three NCAA tournament appearances, including a Conference USA Championship, regional championship leading to an NCAA super regional in 2009. For his efforts that year, he was named Conference USA Assistant Coach of the Year by SEBaseball.com. East Carolina averaged 40 wins per year from 2006 to 2009.

In 2010, Jarrett moved to Auburn, where he worked for three seasons, earning Southeastern Conference Assistant Coach of the Year from SEBaseball.com. In his time at Auburn, the Tigers appeared in three SEC Tournaments, won the SEC West Regular season Championship, hosted the 2010 Auburn Regional, averaged 34 wins, and saw 19 players drafted in the Major League Baseball draft. The Auburn hitters also broke 7 school records under his guidance. Jarrett's teams have led the NCAA in 8 offensive categories since 2009. Jarrett has been a part of conference championships in the ACC, Conference USA, and the SEC. Overall, Jarrett's teams have led their conference statistically in 36 categories over the last 9 seasons.

On July 26, 2012, Jarrett was hired at UNC Greensboro, his first head coaching position. UNCG's overall record in 2016 led the SoCon and was UNCG's most successful season since 1997. Jarrett's program at UNCG has also been recognized nationally by the American Baseball Coaches Association for overall academic performance. 2017 gave UNCG its first conference championship since 1998 and the Spartans first post-season appearance since 1997. Since 2009, Jarrett has produced 10 NCAA Statistical Championships in different offensive categories. In the time that Jarrett has been at UNCG there have been 29 school records that have been broken.

On July 12, 2019, Jarrett was named the head baseball coach at the University of Notre Dame. Jarrett helped the Fighting Irish reach the College World Series in 2022, the school's first appearance since 2002.

On June 22, 2022, Jarrett was named the head baseball coach at Florida State University.

In Jarrett's first season as head coach for Florida State they finished the season 23–31 (9–21 in conference play), snapping Florida State's consecutive NCAA tournament appearance streak at 44 straight years and posting their first losing season in program history. In his second season, he led the largest turnaround in the country, leading the Seminoles to the second best start in school history, doubling their win total from the prior year, being selected as a host in the tournament, and advancing to the College World Series.

== Head coaching record ==
The table below lists Jarrett's record as a head coach at the Division I level.

Record table
Season	Team	Overall	Conference	Standing	Postseason
UNC Greensboro Spartans (Southern Conference) (2013–2019)
2013	UNC Greensboro	24–31	11–19	10th	
2014	UNC Greensboro	21–28	8–16	9th	
2015	UNC Greensboro	23–27	12–12	t-4th	
2016	UNC Greensboro	38–21	15–9	t-2nd	
2017	UNC Greensboro	36–24	14–10	3rd	NCAA Regional
2018	UNC Greensboro	39–15	18–3	1st	
2019	UNC Greensboro	34–20	14–10	3rd	
UNC Greensboro:		215–166 (.564)	92–79 (.538)		
Notre Dame Fighting Irish (Atlantic Coast Conference) (2020–2022)
2020	Notre Dame	11–2	3–0		Season canceled due to COVID-19
2021	Notre Dame	34–13	25–10	1st (Atlantic)	NCAA Super Regional
2022	Notre Dame	41–17	16–11	2nd (Atlantic)	College World Series
Notre Dame:		86–32 (.729)	44–21 (.677)		
Florida State Seminoles (Atlantic Coast Conference) (2023–present)
2023	Florida State	23–31	9–21	7th (Atlantic)	
2024	Florida State	49–17	17–12	3rd (Atlantic)	College World Series Semifinals
2025	Florida State	42–16	17–10	2nd	NCAA Super Regional
2026	Florida State	40–19	19–11	3rd	NCAA Regional
2027	Florida State	0–0	0–0		
Florida State:		154–83 (.650)	62–54 (.534)		
Total:		455–281 (.618)			
National champion Postseason invitational champion Conference regular season champion Conference regular season and conference tournament champion Division regular season champion Division regular season and conference tournament champion Conference tournament champion
