= Craig Windham =

American journalist (1949–2016)

- Born: June 20, 1949; Washington, D.C.
- Died: February 28, 2016 (aged 66); Winston-Salem, North Carolina
- Occupation: Journalist

Robert Craig Windham (June 20, 1949 – February 28, 2016) was an American radio journalist and duty reporter for National Public Radio. He was the anchor of NPR's weekday morning newscast, and before that the anchor of NPR's weekend afternoon newscast.

== Life ==
Windham was born in Washington, D.C. He graduated from St. Albans School, and the College of William and Mary, in 1971. He joined NPR in 1995. Prior to working for NPR, Windham was a Washington correspondent for RKO Radio Network.

He went on to earn a Master of Arts and a Ph.D. in counseling from the George Washington University. Windham was a licensed clinical professional counselor and worked with adolescents. His dissertation and research focused on the use of social media and online communication by teenagers.

== Death ==
Windham died on February 28, 2016, from a pulmonary embolism. He was 66.
