= St. Albans School (Washington, D.C.) =

American private prep school

Location
- 3001 Wisconsin Ave NW; Washington, D.C. 20016; United States; 38°55′43″N 77°4′17″W

Information
- Type: Private, Day & Boarding, College-prep
- Motto: Latin: Pro Ecclesia et Pro Patria (For Church and For State)
- Religious affiliation: Episcopal
- Established: 1909 (117 years ago)
- Sister school: National Cathedral School
- CEEB code: 090165
- Headmaster: Jason F. Robinson
- Teaching staff: 69.6 (FTE) (2015–16)
- Grades: 4–12
- Gender: All male
- Enrollment: 598 (2026–27)
- Student to teacher ratio: 8.5 (2015–16)
- Campus type: Urban
- Colors: Blue & White
- Athletics conference: Interstate Athletic Conference; DCSAA
- Team name: Bulldogs
- Accreditation: MSA; AIMS MD-DC
- Publication: The Bulletin (alumni magazine); The Saint Albans News (official newspaper); Albanian (yearbook); Gyre (literary magazine); Ventoux (history magazine); Grace (homily anthology)
- Tuition: Day: $59,938; Boarding: $84,497
- Website: www.stalbansschool.org

St. Albans School (STA) is an independent college preparatory day and boarding school for boys in grades 4–12, located in Washington, D.C. The school is named after Saint Alban, traditionally regarded as the first British martyr.

The school enrolls approximately 570 day students in grades 4–12, and 30 additional boarding students in grades 9–12. It is affiliated with the National Cathedral School and the co-ed Beauvoir School, all of which are located on the grounds of the Washington National Cathedral. All the affiliated schools named are members of the Protestant Episcopal Cathedral Foundation.

== History ==
=== Early years ===
The principal investment for St. Albans was bequeathed by Harriet Lane Johnston, the niece and first lady of President James Buchanan and prominent Washington socialite. A devout Episcopalian throughout her life, Lane Johnston added a codicil to her will in 1899 directing the establishment of a boys school on the grounds of the Washington National Cathedral “in loving memory of [her] sons.” A subsequent codicil four years later raised the financial endowment to $300,000 (nearly $11 million in 2025 dollars), and stipulated that half of the funds should be used for the building’s construction, and the other half for the education of the boy choristers at the Washington National Cathedral.

Soon after her death in 1903, a site was chosen for the Lane-Johnston Building, and the foundation stone was laid in June 1905. By 1907, construction was virtually complete on the new building, which housed everything—classrooms, the dining hall, the headmaster’s study, and a 40-bed dormitory—but the chapel: the Bishop of Washington repurposed an adjacent repository for cathedral furnishings into the Little Sanctuary, adding a bell tower and an archway.

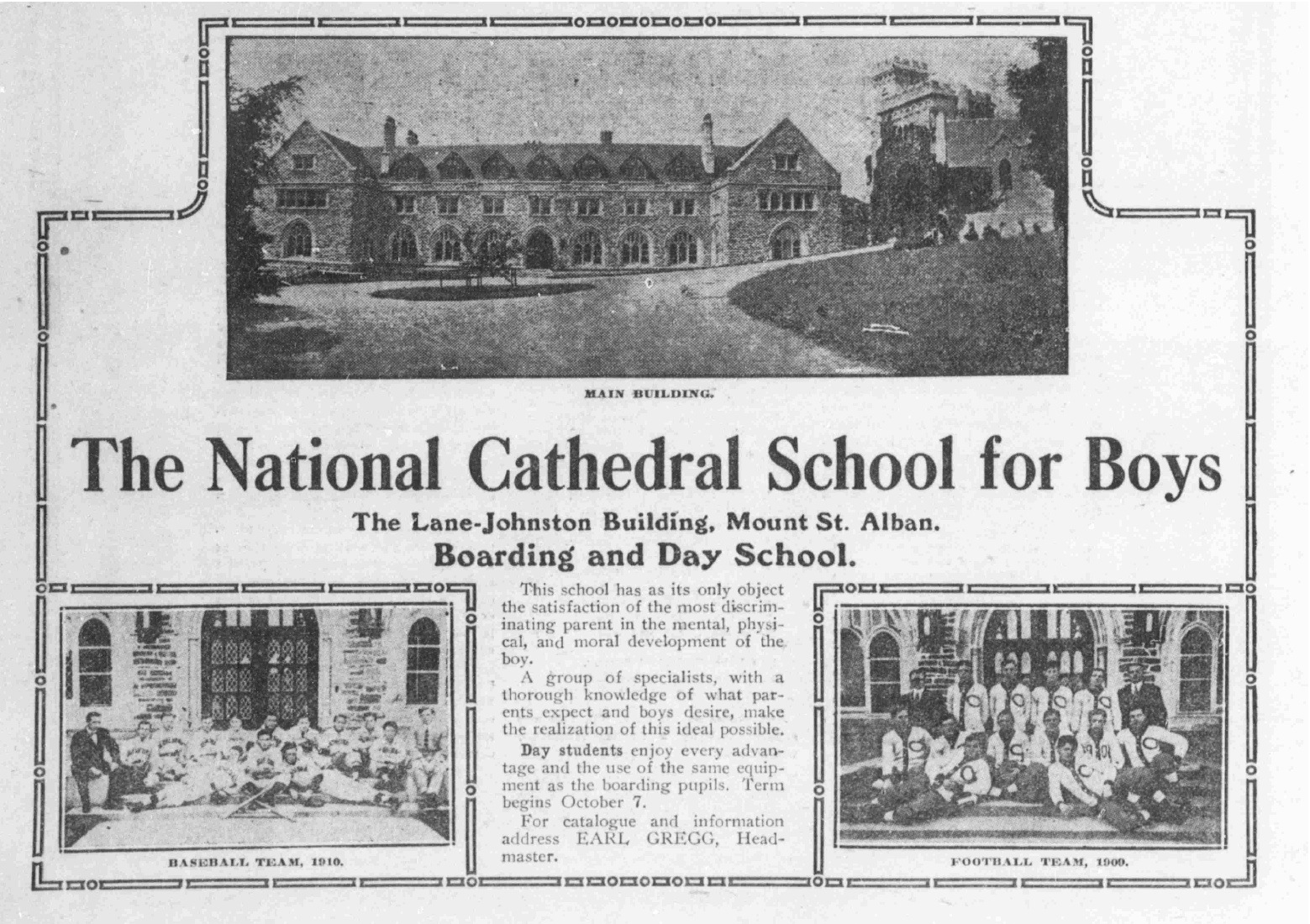
A 1910 advertisement for the National Cathedral School for Boys (later St. Albans)

St. Albans, called the National Cathedral School for Boys until 1914, officially opened its doors in October 1909, with 34 students registered. Enrollment rose to 59 by the end of the first academic year, and surpassed 100 by the end of the second. A large portion of these initial students had transferred from a grammar school in Wisconsin, following their teacher and coach, Earl Lamont Gregg, who became the first headmaster of St. Albans. The school also received a boost in enrollment following the collapse of the Washington School in 1911, headquartered near the present location of Sidwell Friends School. Facing cramped accommodations during its second year, St. Albans subsequently purchased a nearby Queen Anne-style mansion left vacant by the defunct institution to house its Lower School.

Throughout the remainder of Gregg’s term, the school continued to expand. St. Albans attracted numerous teachers and coaches, offering a variety of course offerings and varsity sports to students of all forms. The school’s track program received national attention during this period, largely attributed to sprinter Brooke Brewer. Although membership in the Episcopal Church was not required to attend the school, three-fourths of the student body belonged to the faith and several faculty members were clergy members. The school also required attendance at two daily services for boarders. Additionally, several traditions appeared during these early years that continue to this day: an end-of-year field day, consisting of a blue team and a white team; student elections of prefects; and the donation of a stained-glass window by each graduating senior class to the school’s refectory.

Although most graduates during the school’s early years matriculated to the Ivy League and other highly esteemed universities, St. Albans struggled to retain students in its Upper School, with many transferring to well-established boarding schools in New England. Efforts to fill the upper forms included reducing the tuition for boarding students. In addition to the already liberal scholarships for athletes, choir boys, and the children of clergy, the school’s finances consistently ran at a deficit, and in 1915, Gregg resigned upon request of the Bishop.

William Howell Church was appointed the next headmaster of St. Albans, and promptly oversaw substantial financial reforms to resolve the school’s debt. Church also implemented a rigorous academic program to raise the educational standard at St. Albans, introducing compulsory college board exams and eliminating athletic scholarships. Student retention in the Upper School, however, remained an issue through the end of Church’s tenure.

Challenges continued to mount for the school in the latter half of the 1910s. Several teachers were called to action during World War I, joining 80 former students who served, and the influenza pandemic resulted in over a hundred cases among students and forced the school to close its doors for two weeks. Notwithstanding these setbacks, St. Albans emerged in the 1920s with much stronger academic and extracurricular records, attracting a handful of students from prominent Washington social and political families, especially in the Lower School. The choral program remained a focal point and continued to draw a large cohort of boy choristers, despite the two hours of daily rehearsal, four weekly evensongs, and three Sunday services, all on top of school work. Other students wrote for the school’s two newspapers, The Albanian and The Albanac. The publications evolved into their modern iterations—a yearbook of the same name and The Saint Albans News, respectively—early in the next decade.

By 1928, the increasing traffic on Massachusetts Avenue proved dangerous for Lower School students, who had to cross the street to attend chapel and meals. The school contracted Ralph Adams Cram, an architectural consultant for the Cathedral, to conceive plans for a new Lower School building. The three-story facility was completed within a few years and contained new classrooms, faculty living quarters, and music practice rooms.

=== Maturation and Adaptation ===
Due to failing health, Church resigned in 1929 and was succeeded by Albert Hawley Lucas, then a priest and vice principal at Episcopal Academy in Philadelphia. Although much of the school’s religious and academic character predated his tenure, Lucas ushered in a conscious emulation of English public schools, keeping in tradition with the school’s name. St. Albans during Lucas’s two decades sought to emphasize a classical education—with greater focus on mathematics, languages, and history than on social sciences—and the development of character through rigorous, compulsory athletics.

St. Albans was largely unaffected by the Great Depression due to its location in the nation’s capital. Some parents struggled to pay tuition, but the government domination of the city spared many of its residents from the economic slump of the next decade. In fact, faculty and student enrollment grew during this period, both doubling in size by the start of the Second World War. Lucas also managed to find funding for the Activities Building—designed by Waldron Faulkner—which housed a basketball court, a newsroom, carpentry shops, and a library upon its completion at the end of the decade.

An era of intense political upheaval, the decade also yielded the establishment of the Government Club in 1934, among the oldest continuously operating clubs at the school. Divided into Liberal and Conservative parties, the club regularly debates prominent political issues and hosts speakers of national relevance. Notable members include Vice President Al Gore ’65, Senator Michael Bennet ’83, and Representative Harold Ford Jr. '88, all presidents emeriti of the Liberal party.

St. Albans, like most institutions, drastically evolved in the wake of the attacks on Pearl Harbor. By September 1942, 10 faculty members (out of roughly 30) and 125 alumni were already in service, and the school offered new courses in auto mechanics and model aircraft construction. Many students took summer school classes to accelerate their education and attend college early. In the end, 14 alumni died during the war.

Although the remainder of the Lucas years were dominated by the necessity of rebuilding the faculty after the war, the headmaster managed to gain substantial financial independence for St. Albans from the Protestant Episcopal Cathedral Foundation (PECF), establishing an independent board of governors in 1946. Despite the historically hands-off nature of the PECF concerning St. Albans, Lucas sought to avoid future conflict regarding the autonomy of the school to make its own financial decisions. The PECF still retains ultimate decision-making ability—as it does for all institutions on the Close—but it has since very rarely strayed from the verdict of the board.

Lucas retired in 1949, and asked Charles Martin to succeed him as headmaster. Martin, who taught with Lucas at Episcopal Academy, had left academia a few years earlier to become the rector at an Episcopal church in Burlington, Vermont, but was persuaded to accept the position at the urging of Lucas and many St. Albans faculty members. The new headmaster was known for his bulldogs, which replaced the saints as the school’s new mascot over the course of his tenure.

Martin immediately set out to expand the school’s facilities. With 375 students crammed into accommodations built for 250, Martin developed plans for a five-story addition to the southeast end of the building housing the Lower School, set to contain science laboratories, new classrooms, an art studio, and an expanded refectory. Although funding and post-war supply shortages resulted in two stages of construction over the course of the 1950s, the addition rounded out today’s True-Lucas Building.

St. Albans was by no means isolated from the worldly events of the 1950s. The names of several students, in relation to their fathers, were implicated in the investigations by Senator Joseph McCarthy. One student, the son of Army Secretary Robert Stevens, ended up in a fist fight with several of his classmates. Upon the outbreak of the Korean War, St. Albans also developed contingency plans in the event of a nuclear attack. Among them was the crypt of the Cathedral, which was subsequently stocked with emergency supplies.

=== Modernizing St. Albans ===
In 1952, the PECF passed a unanimous resolution calling on the three schools under its jurisdiction to admit “children of all races.” With the exception of a few white-passing children of foreign diplomats, the student body at St. Albans had been historically all-white; no records indicated that there had ever even been a non-white applicant. Yet, following the Cathedral’s suggestion, St. Albans implemented a gradual schedule of integration in 1954, becoming one of the first independent schools in the region to desegregate. The school’s first black student, Frank Snowden, entered sixth grade in 1957.

Although some were concerned about parental backlash regarding integration, St. Albans continued to attract the children of prominent Washington business and political families. At one point, the children of four senators and nine representatives simultaneously attended the school. A few of these influential parents even sat on the board. The school’s track record for college matriculation also boosted its national reputation; thirty-six percent of graduating seniors were accepted to Harvard University in 1957.

The school added a new library, theater, and renovated playing fields in the 1960s, accommodating its gradually increasing enrollment. Efforts to expand financial aid also opened the school’s doors to more students of diverse backgrounds. An increasing number of students had divorced parents or lacked ties to the church. In 1970, St. Albans implemented a program called “Risk” to bring in students from underrepresented neighborhoods in the city, now known as the Skip Grant Program.

Students were undoubtedly influenced by the social trends of the era, with more willingness to rebuke teachers regarding dress code and academic standards. For a few years, students replaced the traditional prefects with a more democratic student council. Some students and teachers even considered eliminating grades. Student responses to the Vietnam War, by contrast, were relatively muted because draft eligibility could be postponed by student deferments.

As the 1970s progressed, St. Albans modernized its curriculum. It offered new courses in ecology, African history, economics, comparative literature, and more. The school also lowered the number of religious courses required to graduate and offered fewer compulsory chapel services each week. Traditional language, religion, and history courses still remained popular, however, despite the new electives.

In 1971, NCS proposed to St. Albans that the schools consolidate their administrative structures into “one coeducational school environment … on the Cathedral Close,” citing the benefit of shared resources and increasing competition from well-funded public schools. Martin, wary about the large size of a merged school and wage differences between St. Albans and NCS faculty, expressed reservations. Others on the board were more concerned about losing the character of an all-boys school. Evidently, the two schools never merged, but they expanded their coordinate academic and athletic offerings throughout the decade, building upon the already co-ed chorus and theater programs. A joint newspaper, called The Exchanged, exists today.

Martin retired in 1977, with a new gymnasium and academic building—called the Steuart Building—under construction. He was replaced by Mark Mullin, an Episcopal priest and assistant headmaster at the all-boys Blue Ridge School near Charlottesville, Virginia. Mullin ushered in several changes within his first few years, including a year-long writer-in-residence program, a new social service requirement, and the establishment of several travel fellowships for students and teachers. Mullin also cultivated relationships with various international schools, including the Keio School in Japan and Stamford School in England, to develop student exchange programs.

Throughout the 1990s, Mullin managed to significantly raise faculty salaries to the highest median among independent schools in the region, competing with the wages given to local public school teachers. He also renovated the aging Lane-Johnston and True-Lucas buildings. Yet, with donations lethargic and expenditures high, St. Albans entered 1997 with substantial financial difficulties. Combined with other strategic disagreements, the Board of Governors forced Mullin to resign in June of that year. The decision was highly controversial; many faculty members threatened to resign.

John McCune, longtime history teacher and Upper School head at St. Albans, emerged from retirement to serve as the school’s headmaster between 1997 and 1999. McCune was widely seen as a unifying force, helping to bridge the deep divisions that emerged during the previous few years. He rebuilt the Board of Governors (all members resigned after the Mullin resignation), increased fundraising levels, and restored normality at the student and faculty level.

Zebulon Vance Wilson was selected in 1999 as the seventh headmaster of St. Albans. In his first few years, Wilson developed a teaching mentorship program for faculty, established the School of Public Service, and expanded elective course offerings. He also spearheaded the school’s two largest capital campaigns, each of which raised tens of millions of dollars for the school.

=== Recent Years ===
In 2010, St. Albans opened its new Upper School building, Marriott Hall, to celebrate the school’s centennial. The firm Skidmore, Owings, and Merrill designed the building, which received considerable media attention.

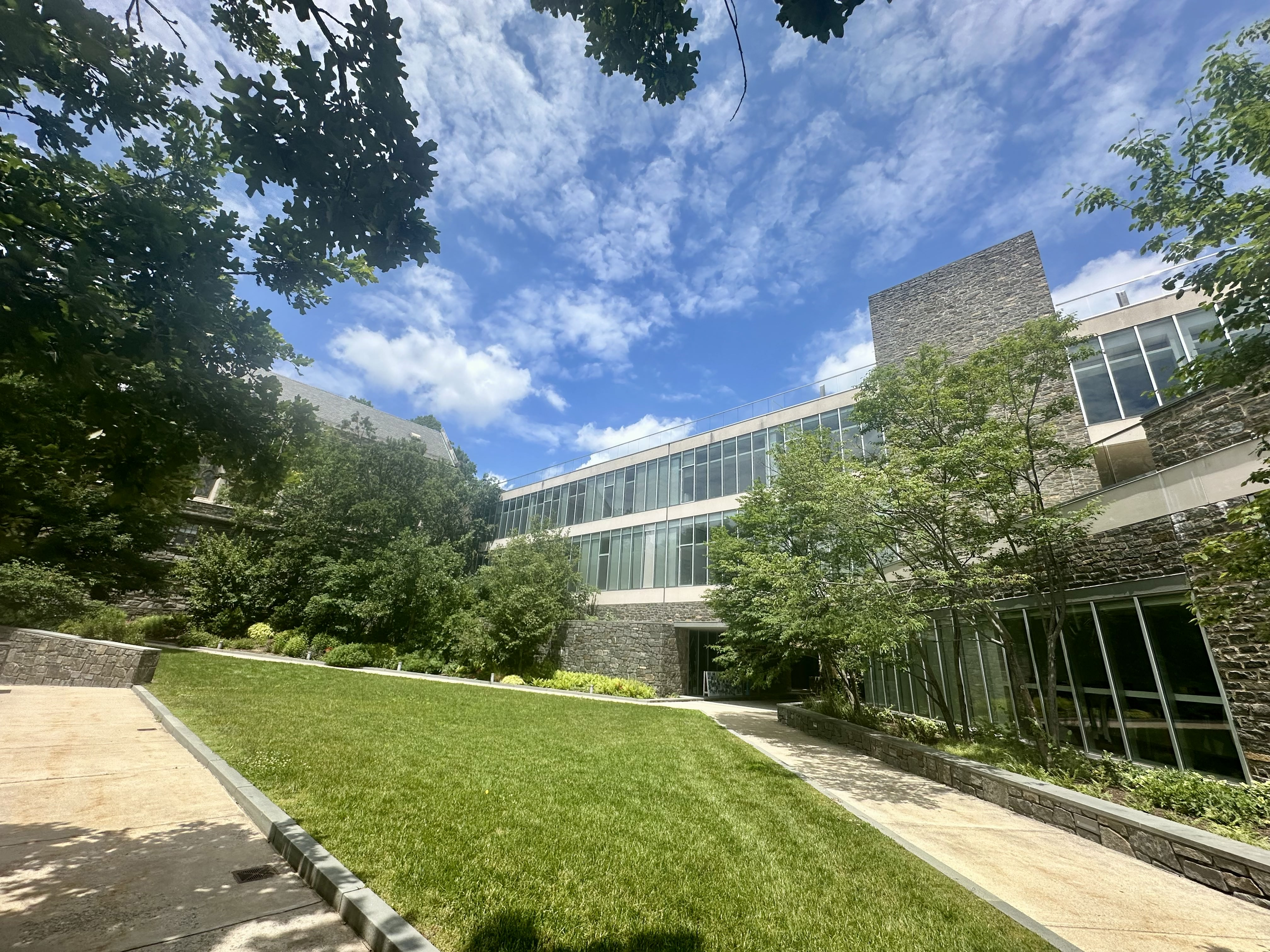
Marriott Hall in 2025

In the wake of the confirmation hearings of Supreme Court Justice Brett Kavanaugh, St. Albans received criticism for sexist slurs in the 2015 edition of The Albanian, its yearbook. The school has since made efforts to increase accountability.

In 2018, St. Albans, along with seven other area private schools, announced it was phasing out Advanced Placement courses from its curriculum by 2022. The United States Department of Justice launched an investigation into whether the collaboration was a violation of the Sherman Act, and the schools subsequently “disavowed” the agreement. St. Albans continues to offer AP courses in science, math, and foreign languages.

Jason Robinson was appointed headmaster in 2018. Robinson announced in 2026 that he was selected to be the next head of school at Lawrenceville School, and a headmaster search is currently underway.

== Finances ==
=== Tuition and Financial Aid ===
For the 2025–2026 school year, St. Albans charged day students $56,966 and boarding students $80,308 for tuition. In 2016, Business Insider listed St. Albans as among the most expensive boarding schools in the United States.

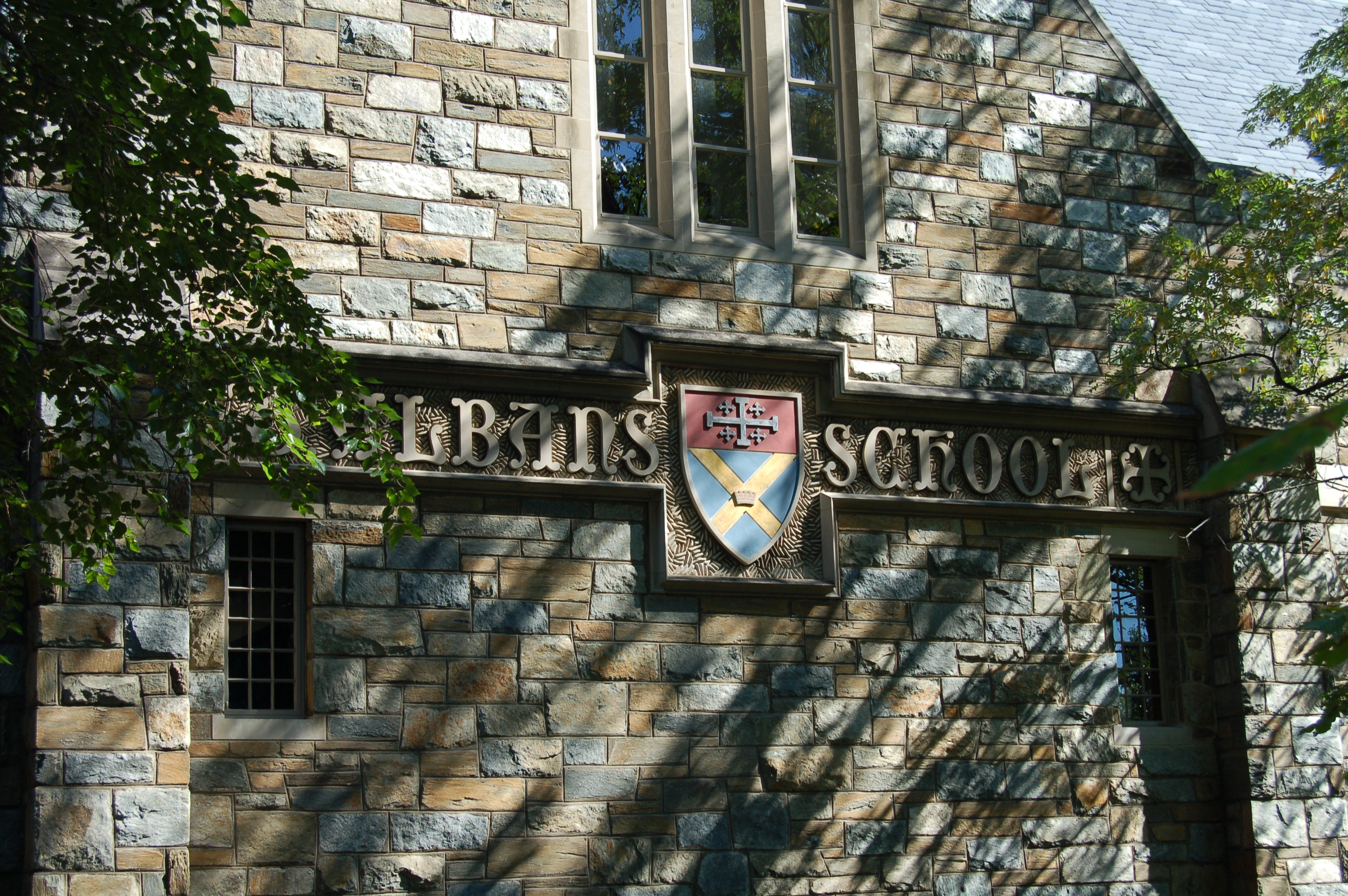
Side of the True-Lucas Building from Massachusetts Avenue

St. Albans offers a need-blind admissions policy. It allocated over $5.8 million in financial aid during the 2023–24 school year, and distributes grants based on family income. The school states that the average aid grant is 65% of tuition.

The school follows a strictly need-based allocation of financial aid, with the exception of stipends for boy choristers in the Lower School and cathedral acolytes in the Upper School.

=== Endowment ===
In 2026, the school’s financial endowment stood at $155 million.

== Academics ==
St. Albans has long held a reputation for its academic intensity and competition among students. Since the school’s founding, dozens of students matriculate to Ivy League universities and similarly ranked schools each year. In 2015, St. Albans students had the highest average SAT scores of any U.S. boarding school. The class of 2023 had a median composite ACT score of 33.

The school reports that its average class size is 13 students.

=== Curriculum ===
St. Albans has a traditional curriculum, placing an emphasis on the humanities—especially English, history, and languages—while also offering numerous courses in STEM subjects. It is rooted in the Episcopal pedagogical tradition, and as such religion courses are required in both Lower and Upper Schools. The school also values giving teachers more autonomy in the classroom, and as such teaching styles range from conservative to innovative.

In the Lower School, St. Albans focuses on developing the students’ learning skills. Students are required to take math, English, history, science, and language classes all five years, and other obligatory classes—music, art, ethics, theater—vary semester to semester. Spanish instruction is mandatory in Forms C, B, and A (grades 4-6), while students may opt to take other languages in Forms I and II (grades 7-8), including French, Latin, and Chinese (although most students continue with Spanish).

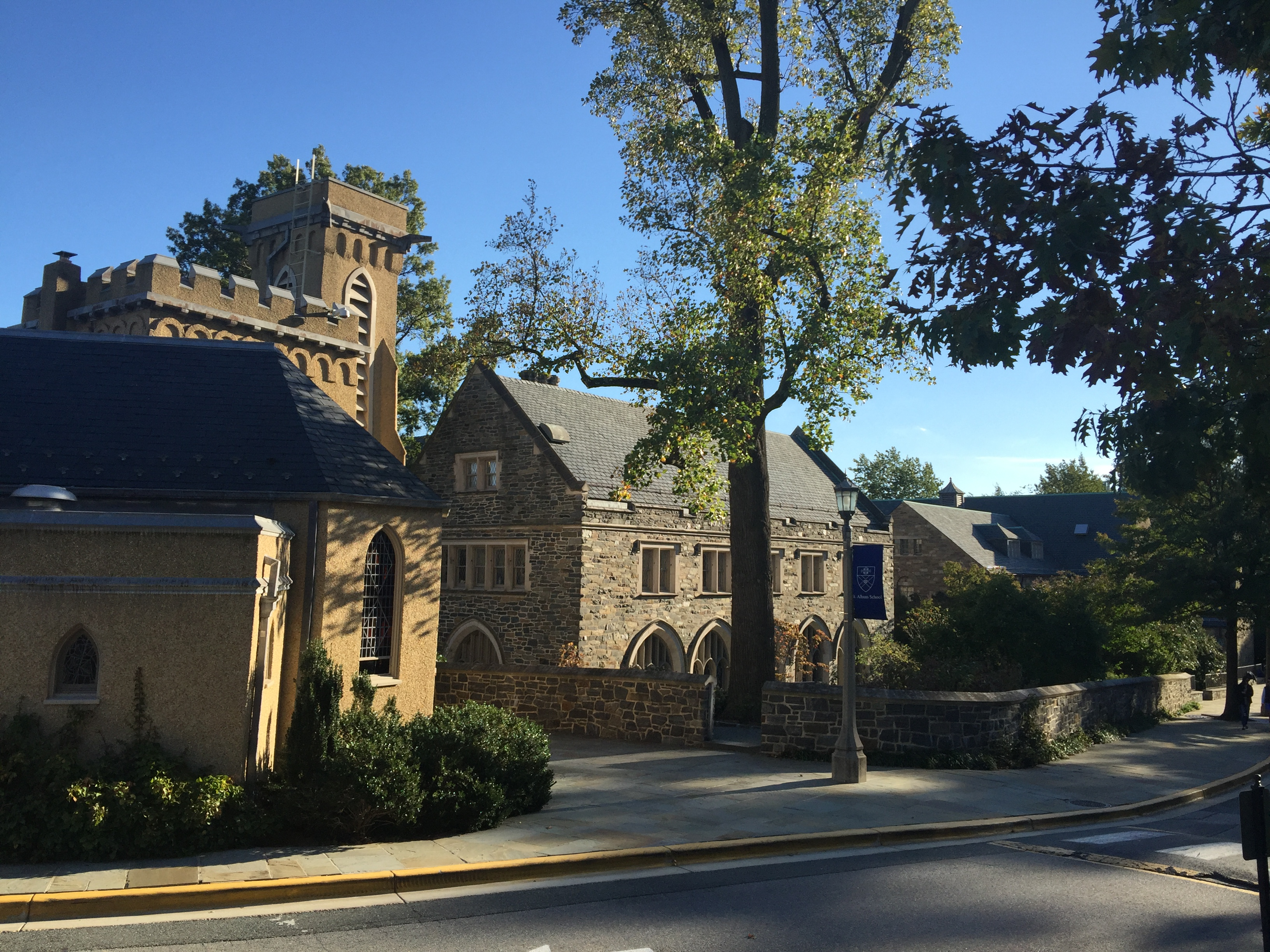
The Lane-Johnston Building and Little Sanctuary from Pilgrim Road

The Upper School has similar requirements, requiring three years of study in each of the core subject areas, and four in English. For language arts, the Form I and II teachings count as 1 year for the upper school requirement (most students choose to continue with language arts into their junior and some in their senior year). The school also requires two semesters of arts-related coursework—art classes, chorus, orchestra, or theater—and two semesters of religion, taken in a student’s freshman and senior years. St. Albans also offers dozens of elective courses in all subjects, and a few students pursue independent studies with faculty members if they exhaust course offerings in a certain department. The school also offers AP courses in science, math, and languages, and honors courses in all subjects but English.

Since the 1970s, St. Albans has offered a coordinate program with NCS. Chorus, orchestra, and theater are co-ed starting in Form I, and students may take electives at either school beginning in Form III. Beginning in Form V, all English courses, including the required American literature course, are coordinate.

=== Grading ===
GPA is calculated based on an unweighted, 100-point scale, taking into account numerical grades from each course. The passing grade is a C, or 70%.

=== College Admissions ===
Although college admissions have grown increasingly meritocratic and put an emphasis on diversity, St. Albans remains comparatively successful in its college matriculation statistics. The school reports that 68 students went on to attend Ivy League schools between 2019 and 2024, and another 76 matriculated to UChicago (37), Georgetown (13), Boston College (11), UVA (9), and Duke (6).

In 2004, the Wall Street Journal found that, among U.S. schools, St. Albans had the 11th-highest success rate in placing students in 10 selective universities.

=== Travel ===
St. Albans offers several foreign travel programs, seeking to expand its students’ “knowledge of [the] world and their place in it.” The school has exchange partnerships with six schools on four continents, giving students the opportunity to swap places with an international student for a few months. Students are typically selected by their deans to pursue these programs. Other opportunities have included: language class trips to their respective country of study; chorus tours of Chile, South Africa, and Britain; and a cross-country team exchange program with St Albans School in England.

The school also offers 13 endowed fellowships that enable students to pursue an extracurricular area of study, travel, or a social service project over the summer. Students typically apply for these programs at the spring semester, and present their learnings at a school assembly the following fall. Select fellowships include funding for students to work at a non-profit in Africa, conduct laboratory research, or produce art for display in the school.

Roughly one in two students travel abroad on school-sponsored trips before they graduate.

=== Service ===
St. Albans requires 60 hours of volunteer community service before students enter their senior year. Half of those hours must be completed within the DC area and be from approved organizations, including retirement homes or food banks.

=== Faculty ===
The school’s average faculty tenure is 12 years. Roughly 80% have advanced degrees.

St. Albans sponsors a writer-in-residence each year, who teaches English classes while developing their work.

Notable faculty include:

- Donna Denizé, English teacher
- Benjamin Hutto, choral director
- Michael McCarthy, chorister program director
- Norman Scribner, organist
- Curtis Sittenfeld, writer-in-residence

== Athletics ==
St. Albans offers 14 interscholastic sports teams at varsity, junior varsity, and middle school levels; several non-competition athletic programs; and physical education classes for fourth and fifth grades. Athletics are required for all students, although seniors may skip one season.

The school competes in the Interstate Athletic Conference (IAC), a league of independent schools in the Washington area. Other members include Georgetown Preparatory School, Bullis School, Episcopal High School, Landon School, and St. Stephen's and St. Agnes School. Landon is historically the school’s main athletic rival.

Since 2019, St. Albans has won IAC championships in cross-country, soccer, ice hockey, tennis, golf, and track and field. The school’s cross-country team is one of the most successful in the Mid-Atlantic region. It has won every IAC championship since 2009. In 2024, the boys cross-country team won the DCSAA postseason championship, came in second in the Nike Southeast Regionals, and placed 18th at Nike Cross Nationals.

Several sports are co-ed with NCS, including cross-country, track and field, swimming, crew, and voyageur (rock climbing, kayaking).

== Campus ==
St. Albans is situated on the 59-acre close of the Washington National Cathedral, sharing the grounds with the National Cathedral School, Beauvoir School, and the facilities of the Protestant Episcopal Cathedral Foundation. The school is located in the Cathedral Heights neighborhood of Northwest Washington, D.C., and sits at the crossroads of Massachusetts Avenue and Wisconsin Avenue, two major arteries into downtown Washington.

The Close is situated atop Mount Saint Alban, which overlooks a substantial portion of the Washington, D.C., skyline. Walking towards the school, the Washington Monument and Capitol Building are visible, as well as other notable landmarks.

=== Academic Facilities ===
- The Lane-Johnston Building is the school’s original academic building, built in 1908. It holds most of the school’s administrative and admissions offices, classrooms, the refectory, and the dormitory.
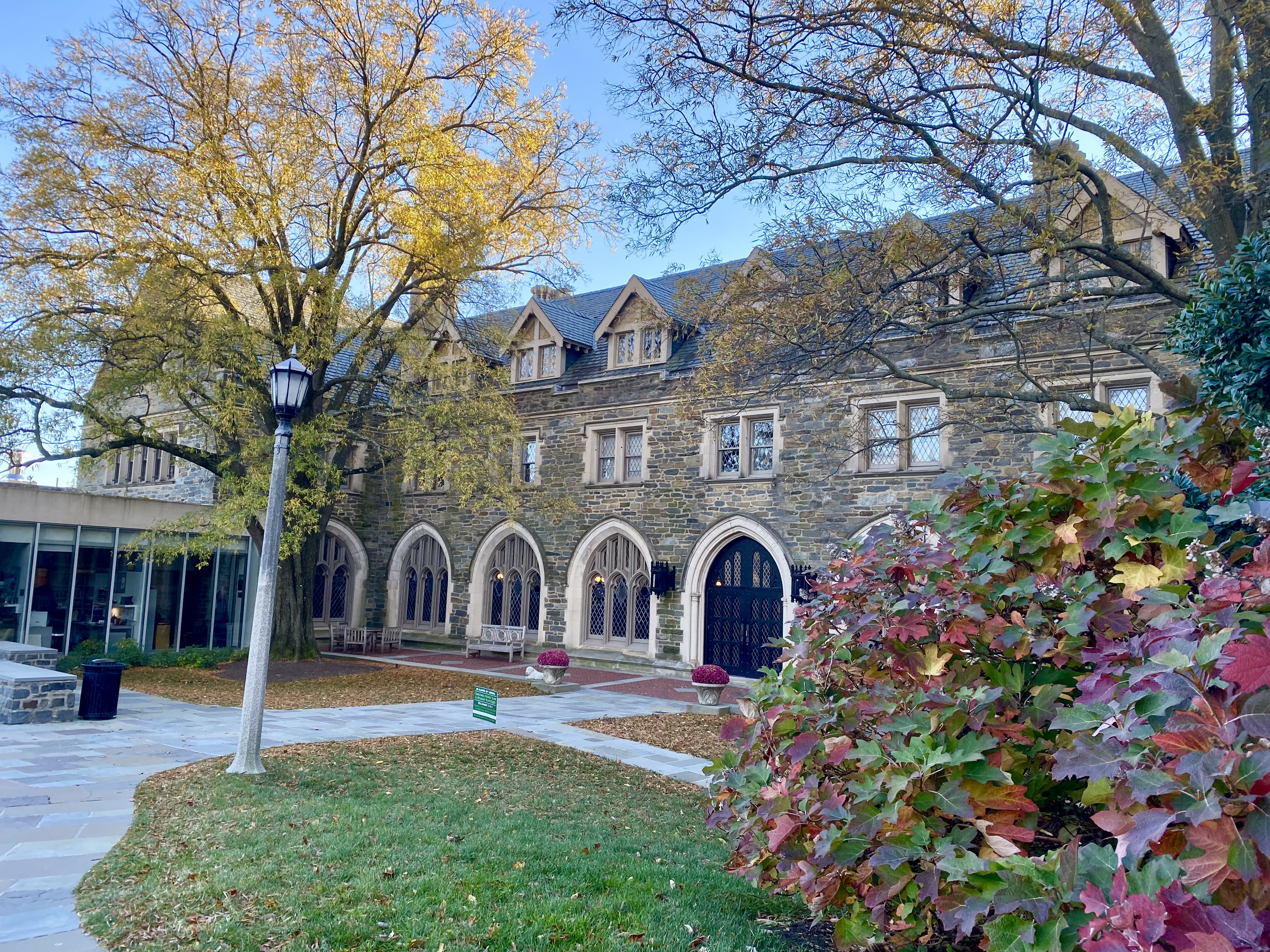
  The Lane-Johnston Building
- The True-Lucas Building houses all Lower School classrooms, a music room, and Upper School science laboratories. First built in 1928, the building was expanded in the 1950s and 1990s.
- The Steuart Building, built in 1975, holds Upper School classrooms, art studios, the IT department, a robotics lab, and a chorus practice room.
- Marriott Hall contains Upper School classrooms, faculty offices, and the school’s bookstore. It was constructed in 2009 for the school’s centennial anniversary.
- The Ellison Library was constructed in 1968 and contains thousands of books, a recording studio, and study space.
- Trapier Theater is located directly underneath Ellison Library and hosts a variety of performing arts events.

=== Athletic Facilities ===
- The Activities Building contains two basketball courts, a weight room, a wrestling room, locker rooms, and the Kellogg Room: classroom and home to the school’s Government Club. The building was constructed in 1938 and renovated in 2024.
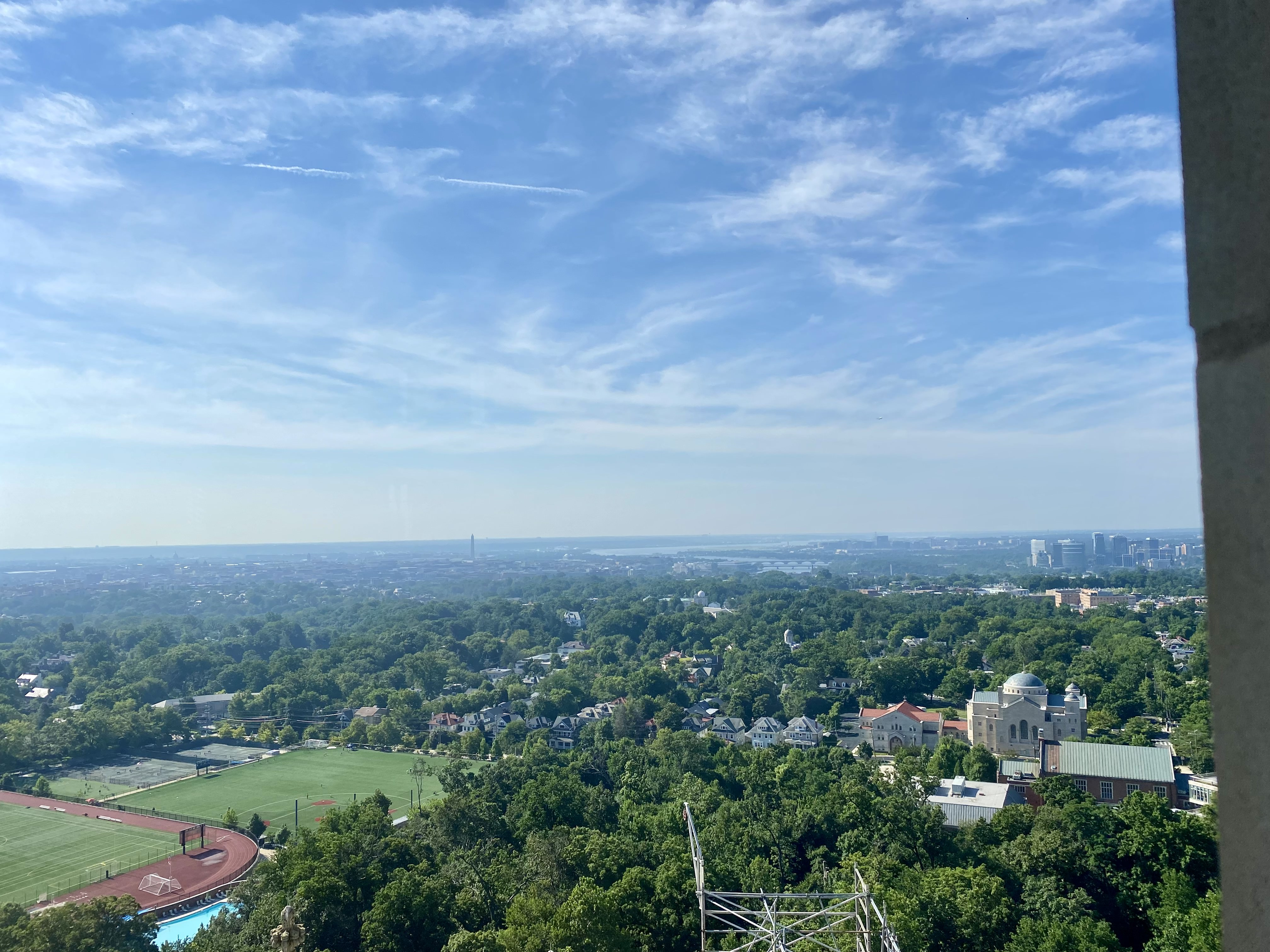
  Sports fields, tennis courts, and the Activities Building (right, green roof) as viewed from the National Cathedral
- The Lawrence Pool, an indoor pool with six 25-yard lanes.
- The Steuart Field, a full-sized football field surrounded by a 400-meter track.
- The Satterlee-Henderson Field, a combined baseball diamond and practice field.
- The St. Albans Tennis Center, with seven clay tennis courts.
- Students use the Agnes Underwood Athletic Center at NCS for rock climbing, dance, and indoor track.

=== Other Notable Places ===
- The Little Sanctuary was originally a repository for cathedral furnishings, and was converted into the school’s chapel in 1909. It was most recently expanded in 2025.
- Senior Circle, a traffic circle located in front of the Lane-Johnston Building. At its center is a Glastonbury thorn, said to be a planted trimming from a tree in Somerset, England.
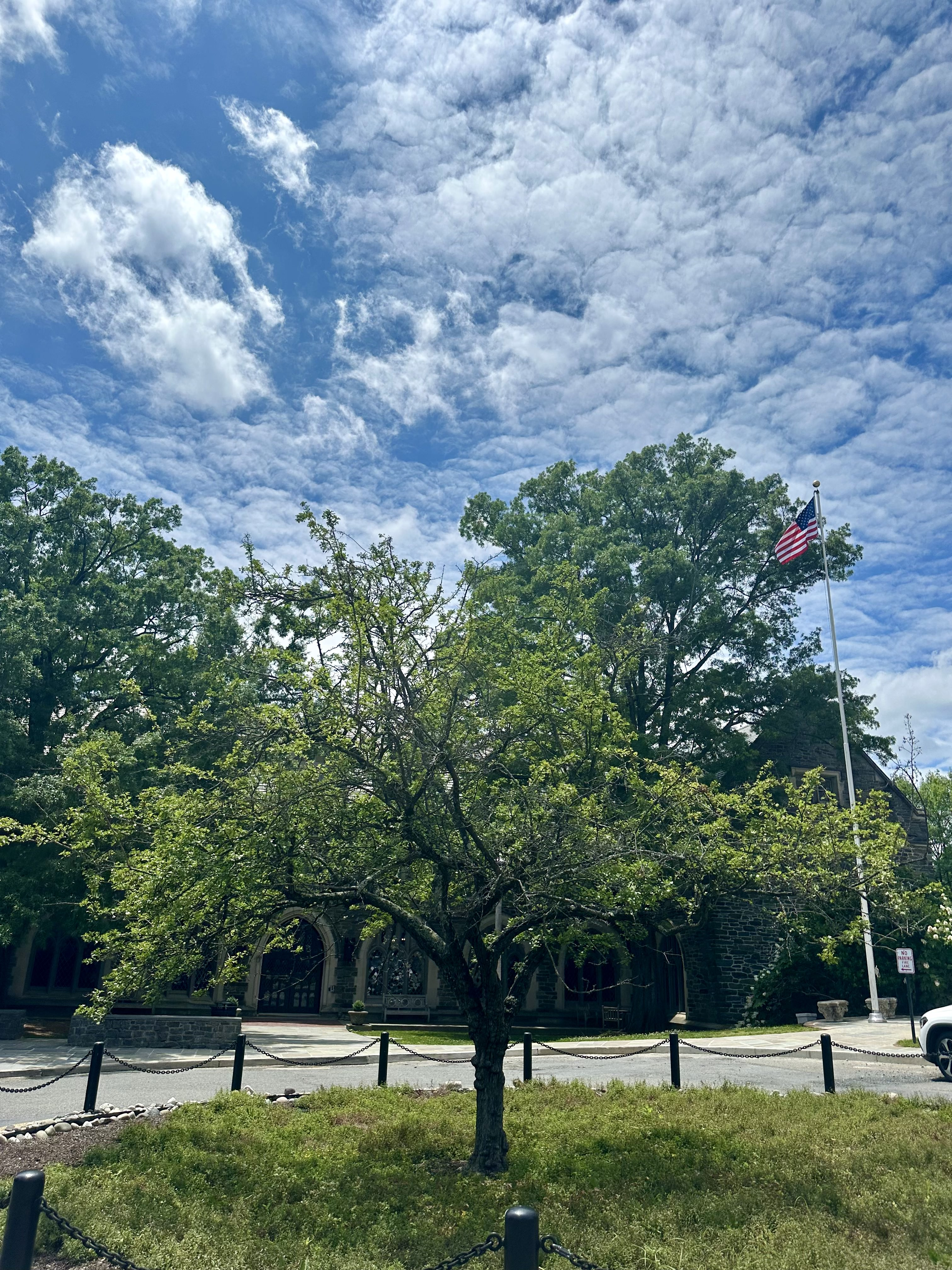
  The Glastonbury Thorn
- The Olmsted Woods, designed by Frederick Law Olmsted Jr., sits between the school’s academic and athletic fields and contains walking paths and an outdoor amphitheatre.

== Student Life ==
During the 2024–2025 school year, St. Albans reported that 566 day students and 27 boarding students were enrolled at the school. Across all grades, 43% are students of color.

=== Extracurriculars ===
Most students participate in extracurricular activities. The school has six active student publications, of which a few have won awards. The six are as follows:

- The Saint Albans News, the school's oldest newspaper
- Gyre, a literary magazine
- Grace, an anthology of chapel talks
- The Albanian, the Upper School yearbook
- The Exchanged, an independent newspaper published jointly with NCS
- Ventoux, a history magazine

The school reports that it has other clubs, including Model U.N., a history club, a fishing club, and a knitting club.

St. Albans has won national recognition for various student extracurricular teams. Its robotics team is in the top 4% in the world, and has competed at the VEX Robotics world championships the past four years. The school’s Euro Challenge team won the economics competition in 2018. Additionally, St. Albans has competed on the game show It’s Academic several times in the past few years.

=== Traditions ===
St. Albans has a dress code. Students are required to wear a jacket and tie, although dress shoes are no longer required. Students also can choose the option of wearing a turtleneck and sweater.

All students and faculty members eat together in the school’s refectory each day. Students are assigned randomized seating every few weeks, and are encouraged to engage with peers in older and younger grades.

The Upper School student council is composed of three prefects from each grade and five from the senior class, with a head prefect elected by the entire Upper School. Students also elect vestry members from each grade to run chapel services. Seniors are encouraged to give chapel talks to the student body during their final year at the school.

The boy chorister program remains an integral part of the Lower School, with around a dozen singers each year. For non-choristers, music remains an important part of the school. The Upper School chorale—combined with NCS—often has as many as 160 singers, although numbers have decreased since the COVID-19 pandemic. Orchestra, jazz band, and a cappella are similarly popular.

=== School Motto, Prayer, and Hymn ===
The school’s motto, Pro Ecclesia et Pro Patria, is Latin for “for church and for state.” Many within the St. Albans community consider the unofficial motto to be “choose the hard right over the easy wrong,” coined by the school’s fourth headmaster, Canon Charles Martin.

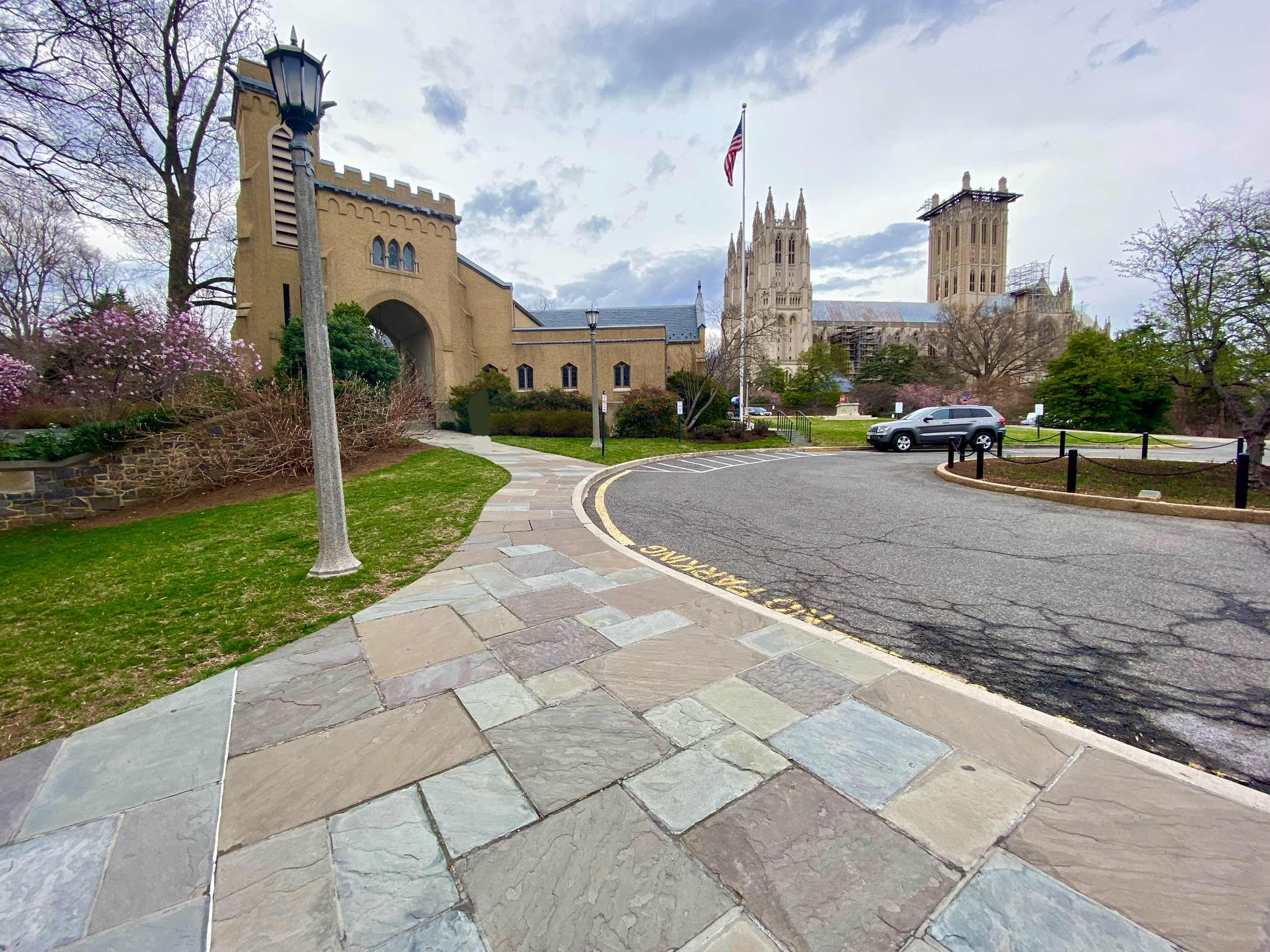
Students have chapel services in the Little Sanctuary and the Washington National Cathedral

Michael Collins ‘48, Apollo 11 astronaut, carried a copy of the St. Albans school prayer with him on his journey to the Moon. It reads as follows:

"Vouchsafe thy blessing, we beseech thee, O Lord, upon this school and upon all other works undertaken in thy fear and for thy glory; and grant that all who serve thee here, whether as teachers or learners, may set thy holy will ever before them, and seek always to do such things as are pleasing in thy sight; that so both the Church and Commonwealth of this land may benefit by their labors, and they themselves may attain unto everlasting life; through Jesus Christ our Lord. Amen."

The school hymn, “Men of the Future, Stand,” has four verses and is sung to the tune of “Diademata.” It was written by Edith Church, wife of the school’s second headmaster, William Howell Church.

== Other Academic Programs ==
=== School of Public Service ===
Founded in 2002, the School of Public Service is a four-week, co-ed residential summer program that aims to instill a greater appreciation for public policy and government. The program admits roughly 40 rising high school seniors from across the world who are interested in politics or any facet of public service. The academic component of the program features notable speakers with significant public service experience, uses case studies adopted from Harvard’s Kennedy School of Government, and requires students to simulate a Supreme Court case. The program benefits from its Washington, D.C., location, also providing students with tours of museums, government buildings, and other national sites in the city.

== In popular culture ==
In season 3, episode 6 of the sitcom The Unbreakable Kimmy Schmidt, the character Duke Snyder asserts he was “linebacker at St. Albans School for Boys and their Nannies.”

== Notable alumni ==
- Jonathan Agronsky '64, journalist and author
- Malcolm Baker '87, professor at Harvard Business School and former Olympic rower
- Evan Bayh '74, former United States Senator for Indiana
- Ralph Becker, mayor of Salt Lake City
- John Bellinger '78, Legal Adviser of the Department of State (2005–2009)
- Odell Beckham Jr., current NFL Wide Receiver, attended 7th grade after his home town was struck by Hurricane Katrina.
- James Bennet, '84 former editor-in-chief of the Atlantic Monthly magazine
- Michael Bennet '83, United States Senator for Colorado
- James Boasberg '81, District Judge on the United States District Court for the District of Columbia
- Joshua Bolten '72, former White House Chief of Staff
- Nicholas Boggs '92, biographer
- William L. Borden '38, executive director of United States Congress Joint Committee on Atomic Energy
- Matt Bowman '09, pitcher in Major League Baseball
- Brooke "Untz" Brewer '16, Former NFL athlete and world class sprinter
- Francis Brooke, political advisor
- Clancy Brown '77, actor and former chairman of the board of Brown Publishing Company
- Olin Browne '77, golfer
- Garnett Bruce '85, opera director
- Neil Bush '73
- Josh Byrnes, baseball administrator
- Goodloe Byron '45, Congressman
- John Casey '57, novelist
- Michael Collins '48, Apollo 11 astronaut
- Walter J. Cummings Jr., Solicitor General of the United States from 1952 to 1953; judge on the United States Court of Appeals for the Seventh Circuit
- Jonathan W. Daniels '18, White House Press Secretary, author
- Eli Whitney Debevoise II '70, United States executive director of The World Bank
- Brandon Victor Dixon '99, Tony-nominated Broadway actor
- Peter Feldman '00, commissioner of the U.S. Consumer Product Safety Commission
- George M. Ferris Jr. '44, president of the firm Ferris Baker Watts
- Adrian S. Fisher, diplomat and lawyer, Legal Adviser of the Department of State (1949–1953)
- Miles Fisher '02, television and film actor
- Harold Ford Jr. '88, former United States Congressman, Fox News contributor, and current head of the Democratic Leadership Council
- Rodney Frelinghuysen '64, United States Congressman from New Jersey
- David Gardner '84, co-founder of The Motley Fool
- Tom Gardner '86, co-founder of The Motley Fool
- James W. Gilchrist, politician
- Al Gore Jr. '65, the 45th Vice President of the United States.
- Donald E. Graham '62, newspaper chairman
- Ernest Graves Jr. '41, lieutenant general, former director of Defense Security Cooperation Agency
- Frederick Hauck '58, astronaut
- Bill Hobby '49, Lieutenant Governor of Texas 1973–1991
- Jesse Hubbard '94, professional lacrosse player
- Danny Hultzen '08, baseball pitcher, 2nd overall pick of the 2011 Major League Baseball draft by the Seattle Mariners
- Brit Hume '61, Fox News television anchor
- Reed Hundt '65, former FCC Chairman
- Prince Feisal bin Al Hussein of Jordan '81, son of King Hussein and Princess Muna al-Hussein, and the younger brother of King Abdullah II.
- David Ignatius '68, Washington Post columnist, author of Body of Lies
- Uzodinma Iweala '00, author
- Jesse Jackson Jr. '84, Congressman
- Bo Jones '64, publisher
- Thomas Kean '53, former governor of New Jersey, chairman of the 9/11 Commission, attended 4th and 5th grades
- Randall Kennedy '73, professor
- John Kerry, United States Secretary of State
- Nick Kotz '51, journalist, author, and historian
- Damian Kulash '94, rock singer
- Hamilton Leithauser, musician
- Nick Lowery '74, football player
- J. W. Marriott Jr. '50, billionaire
- Ethan McSweeny, theater administrator
- Arthur Cotton Moore '54, architect
- Bill Oakley '84, media professional
- Jonathan Ogden '92, football player (Baltimore Ravens), Pro Football Hall of Fame
- Jameson Parker, actor
- Laughlin Phillips '42, museum director
- David Plotz '86, writer and editor
- Ben Quayle, Congressman
- Manny Quezada, basketball player
- Justin Rockefeller '98, political activist
- James Roosevelt, Congressman
- Kermit Roosevelt III '88, novelist and law professor
- Mark Roosevelt '74, academic administrator
- Alex Ross '86, music critic
- Luke Russert '04, journalist,
- Hib Sabin '53, sculptor and educator
- Barton Seaver '97, chef and author
- Timothy Shriver '77, chairman of Special Olympics
- Burr Steers, director of the film Igby Goes Down
- William R. Steiger '87, chief of staff of the United States Agency for International Development
- Russell E. Train '37, former director of the EPA, founder/chairman emeritus of World Wildlife Fund
- James Trimble III '43, baseball player and marine, killed in action at Iwo Jima
- Ian Urbina '90, journalist, The New York Times, senior investigative reporter, and director of The Outlaw Ocean Project.
- Gore Vidal, author and writer, attended and went on to graduate from Phillips Exeter Academy
- Peter Jon de Vos '56, former United States Ambassador to Mozambique, Cape Verde, Guinea-Bissau, Liberia, Tanzania, and Costa Rica
- John Warner, former United States Secretary of the Navy, five-term Senator from Virginia, attended a summer session
- Josh Weinstein '84, former executive producer of The Simpsons
- Jonathan Williams, poet, founder of The Jargon Society
- John C. White '94, educator
- David Whiting, journalist and film agent, who mysteriously died during production of The Man Who Loved Cat Dancing, was expelled in his junior year.
- Thomas Wilner '62, lawyer at Shearman & Sterling who represented Guantanamo Bay detention camp detainees
- Craig Windham, NPR radio journalist
- Robert Wisdom '72, actor, played Bunny Colvin on HBO's The Wire
- Jeffrey Wright '83, Emmy and Tony Award-winning actor
- Joon Yun '86, physician and manager in a financial company
- Jeffrey Zients '84, director of the U.S. Office of Management & Budget, first Chief Performance Officer of the United States
