= Florida–Florida State baseball rivalry =

American college baseball rivalry

Florida – Florida State baseball rivalry
- Florida Gators Florida State Seminoles
- First meeting: April 9, 1956; Florida 7, Florida State 5
- Latest meeting: April 7, 2026; Florida 4, Florida State 3
- Next meeting: 2027

Statistics
- Total meetings: 268
- All-time series: Florida State leads, 135–132–1 (.506)
- Largest victory: Florida State, 19–4 (April 9, 2024)
- Longest win streak: Florida, 11 (June 12, 2016–April 9, 2019)
- Current win streak: Florida, 4 (April 8, 2025–present)

Location of Florida and Florida State

The Florida–Florida State baseball rivalry, occasionally called the Sunshine Showdown, is an American college baseball rivalry between the teams of the two oldest public universities of the U.S. state of Florida: the University of Florida Gators and Florida State University Seminoles. Both universities participate in a range of intercollegiate sports, and for the last several years, the Florida Department of Agriculture and Consumer Services has sponsored a "Sunshine Showdown" promotion that tallies the total number of wins for each school in head to head sports competition.

The Florida and Florida State baseball series began in 1956, and the game has usually been played at least two times during the regular season. Since the 2007 season, the two teams have met in three-game midweek series played throughout the non-conference schedule playing in Gainesville, Tallahassee, and Jacksonville at 121 Financial Park. The 2020 series saw only the first game played, as the remainder of the season was canceled due to the COVID-19 pandemic. While FSU owns the all-time series, current Gators head coach Kevin O'Sullivan has given his team the recent upper hand in the battle between the two collegiate baseball powers, amassing a 40-23 record against the Seminoles. Longtime Florida State head coach Mike Martin would ultimately close out his career with 11 consecutive losses to O’Sullivan’s Gators, making his all-time coaching record against UF 76–77.

The two programs have met in twelve different NCAA Baseball Tournaments, including four since O'Sullivan took over the Gators in 2008.

== Game results ==
Florida victories	Florida State victories	Tie games

No.	Date	Location	Winning team		Losing team	
1	April 9, 1956	Gainesville	Florida	7	Florida State	5
2	April 5, 1957	Tallahassee	Florida	13	Florida State	2
3	April 6, 1957	Tallahassee	Florida State	4	Florida	1
4	April 11, 1958	Gainesville	Florida	8	Florida State	7
5	April 12, 1958	Gainesville	Florida	8	Florida State	1
6	June 7, 1958†	Gastonia	Florida	2	Florida State	1
7	March 28, 1959	Tallahassee	Florida State	8	Florida	7
8	April 10, 1959	Tallahassee	Florida	6	Florida State	3
9	April 11, 1959	Tallahassee	Florida	9	Florida State	7
10	May 9, 1960	Gainesville	Florida State	8	Florida	4
11	May 10, 1960	Gainesville	Florida State	13	Florida	11
12	April 3, 1961	Tallahassee	Florida	3	Florida State	2
13	April 4, 1961	Tallahassee	Florida State	8	Florida	5
14	May 18, 1962	Gainesville	Florida	9	Florida State	5
15	May 19, 1962	Gainesville	Florida State	6	Florida	2
16	May 31, 1962†	Gastonia	Florida	1	Florida State	0
17	June 2, 1962†	Gastonia	Florida State	3	Florida	1^{5}
18	May 3, 1963	Gainesville	Florida	3	Florida State	1
19	May 4, 1963	Gainesville	Florida	6	Florida State	3
20	May 24, 1963	Tallahassee	Florida State	6	Florida	2
21	May 25, 1963	Tallahassee	Florida	3	Florida State	1
22	May 25, 1963	Tallahassee	Florida State	5	Florida	1
23	May 22, 1964	Tallahassee	Florida	6	Florida State	2
24	May 23, 1964	Tallahassee	Florida State	4	Florida	3
25	May 29, 1964	Gainesville	Florida	2	Florida State	1
26	May 30, 1964	Gainesville	Florida State	5	Florida	4
27	May 30, 1964	Gainesville	Florida	2	Florida State	1
28	May 21, 1965	Gainesville	Florida	8	Florida State	6
29	May 22, 1965	Gainesville	Florida State	3	Florida	2
30	June 2, 1965	Tallahassee	Florida State	5	Florida	4
31	June 3, 1965	Tallahassee	Florida	11	Florida State	10
32	May 6, 1966	Gainesville	Florida State	16	Florida	4
33	May 7, 1966	Gainesville	Florida	1	Florida State	0
34	May 20, 1966	Tallahassee	Florida State	1	Florida	0

No.	Date	Location	Winning team		Losing team	
35	May 21, 1966	Tallahassee	Florida State	4	Florida	0
36	May 19, 1967	Tallahassee	Florida State	7	Florida	5
37	May 20, 1967	Tallahassee	Florida	5	Florida State	2
38	May 26, 1967	Gainesville	Florida	2	Florida State	1
39	May 26, 1967	Gainesville	Florida State	6	Florida	3
40	May 27, 1967	Gainesville	Florida	3	Florida State	1
41	May 7, 1968	Gainesville	Florida	3	Florida State	2
42	May 8, 1968	Gainesville	Florida	3	Florida State	2
43	May 24, 1968	Tallahassee	Florida State	1	Florida	0
44	May 25, 1968	Tallahassee	Florida State	5	Florida	0
45	May 25, 1968	Tallahassee	Florida State	3	Florida	0
46	April 28, 1969	Tallahassee	Florida State	3	Florida	1
47	April 29, 1969	Tallahassee	Florida	9	Florida State	4
48	May 23, 1969	Gainesville	Florida	8	Florida State	0
49	May 24, 1969	Gainesville	Florida State	3	Florida	1
50	May 24, 1969	Gainesville	Florida	3	Florida State	1
51	May 22, 1970	Tallahassee	Florida	3	Florida State	1
52	May 23, 1970	Tallahassee	Florida	4	Florida State	3
53	May 23, 1970	Tallahassee	Florida	5	Florida State	4
54	May 29, 1970	Gainesville	Florida State	1	Florida	0
55	May 30, 1970	Gainesville	Florida State	9	Florida	4
56	May 21, 1971	Gainesville	Florida State	7	Florida	2
57	May 22, 1971	Gainesville	Florida	4	Florida State	3
58	May 22, 1971	Gainesville	Florida State	2	Florida	0
59	May 28, 1971	Tallahassee	Florida	4	Florida State	3
60	May 29, 1971	Tallahassee	Florida State	7	Florida	0
61	May 19, 1972	Gainesville	Florida	3	Florida State	1
62	May 20, 1972	Gainesville	Florida	3	Florida State	1
63	May 26, 1972	Tallahassee	Florida State	4	Florida	2
64	May 26, 1972	Tallahassee	Florida State	8	Florida	1
65	May 27, 1972	Tallahassee	Florida State	9	Florida	4
66	May 19, 1973	Tallahassee	Florida State	3	Florida	0
67	May 20, 1973	Tallahassee	Florida State	9	Florida	5
68	May 25, 1973	Gainesville	Florida State	8	Florida	7

No.	Date	Location	Winning team		Losing team	
69	May 26, 1973	Gainesville	Florida State	8	Florida	0
70	May 26, 1973	Gainesville	Florida	4	Florida State	0
71	May 17, 1974	Tallahassee	Tie	0	Tie	0
72	May 18, 1974	Tallahassee	Florida State	4	Florida	3
73	May 18, 1974	Tallahassee	Florida	6	Florida State	2
74	May 19, 1974	Gainesville	Florida	5	Florida State	4
75	May 20, 1974	Gainesville	Florida State	4	Florida	3
76	March 1, 1975	Tallahassee	Florida State	14	Florida	0
77	March 2, 1975	Tallahassee	Florida State	6	Florida	4
78	April 29, 1975	Gainesville	Florida	8	Florida State	5
79	April 29, 1975	Gainesville	Florida State	9	Florida	5
80	April 30, 1975	Gainesville	Florida State	8	Florida	7
81	April 12, 1976	Tallahassee	Florida State	8	Florida	2
82	April 13, 1976	Tallahassee	Florida State	3	Florida	1
83	April 20, 1976	Gainesville	Florida State	8	Florida	5
84	April 21, 1976	Gainesville	Florida State	11	Florida	3
85	March 6, 1977	Tallahassee	Florida	8	Florida State	3
86	March 7, 1977	Tallahassee	Florida	2	Florida State	1
87	April 16, 1977	Gainesville	Florida	7	Florida State	3
88	April 17, 1977	Gainesville	Florida State	8	Florida	7
89	April 26, 1978	Tallahassee	Florida State	5	Florida	1
90	April 27, 1978	Tallahassee	Florida State	9	Florida	8
91	May 1, 1978	Gainesville	Florida State	7	Florida	1
92	May 2, 1978	Gainesville	Florida	5	Florida State	4
93	March 8, 1979	Gainesville	Florida State	4	Florida	3
94	March 9, 1979	Gainesville	Florida	16	Florida State	3
95	April 8, 1979	Tallahassee	Florida State	12	Florida	7
96	May 4, 1979	Tallahassee	Florida State	20	Florida	7
97	May 25, 1979†	Tallahassee	Florida	9	Florida State	5
98	March 8, 1980	Tallahassee	Florida	21	Florida State	6
99	April 15, 1980	Gainesville	Florida State	2	Florida	1
100	April 16, 1980	Gainesville	Florida State	15	Florida	2
101	March 13, 1981	Gainesville	Florida State	3	Florida	1
102	March 14, 1981	Gainesville	Florida	17	Florida State	5

No.	Date	Location	Winning team		Losing team	
103	April 1, 1981	Tallahassee	Florida State	14	Florida	10
104	April 2, 1981	Tallahassee	Florida	12	Florida State	9
105	May 21, 1981†	Coral Gables	Florida State	5	Florida	1
106	May 23, 1981†	Coral Gables	Florida	5	Florida State	4
107	March 11, 1982	Tallahassee	Florida State	17	Florida	16
108	March 12, 1982	Tallahassee	Florida State	8	Florida	1
109	March 13, 1982	Gainesville	Florida	9	Florida State	6
110	March 14, 1982	Gainesville	Florida State	7	Florida	6
111	March 5, 1983	Gainesville	Florida	6	Florida State	2
112	March 6, 1983	Gainesville	Florida	16	Florida State	14
113	April 8, 1983	Tallahassee	Florida	7	Florida State	5
114	April 9, 1983	Tallahassee	Florida State	9	Florida	3
115	February 5, 1984	Miami	Florida	8	Florida State	3
116	April 4, 1984	Tallahassee	Florida State	11	Florida	9
117	April 4, 1984	Tallahassee	Florida	11	Florida State	3
118	April 17, 1984	Gainesville	Florida	8	Florida State	7
119	April 18, 1984	Gainesville	Florida State	7	Florida	4
120	March 15, 1985	Gainesville	Florida	3	Florida State	2
121	March 16, 1985	Gainesville	Florida	6	Florida State	1
122	March 27, 1985	Tallahassee	Florida State	12	Florida	10
123	April 2, 1985	Tallahassee	Florida	6	Florida State	3
124	February 25, 1986	Gainesville	Florida State	10	Florida	6
125	February 26, 1986	Gainesville	Florida State	10	Florida	7
126	April 15, 1986	Tallahassee	Florida State	7	Florida	6
127	April 16, 1986	Tallahassee	Florida State	8	Florida	0
128	April 14, 1987	Tallahassee	Florida State	12	Florida	6
129	April 15, 1987	Tallahassee	Florida State	14	Florida	11
130	May 5, 1987	Gainesville	Florida	10	Florida State	5
131	May 6, 1987	Gainesville	Florida	7	Florida State	5
132	April 13, 1988	Tallahassee	Florida State	7	Florida	2
133	April 20, 1988	Gainesville	Florida	8	Florida State	5
134	May 28, 1988†	Tallahassee	Florida	9	Florida State	3
135	February 18, 1989	Gainesville	Florida	5	Florida State	1
136	February 19, 1989	Gainesville	Florida	6	Florida State	5

No.	Date	Location	Winning team		Losing team	
137	April 11, 1989	Tallahassee	Florida	5	Florida State	0
138	April 12, 1989	Tallahassee	Florida State	7	Florida	5
139	March 8, 1990	Gainesville	Florida State	5	Florida	1
140	March 9, 1990	Gainesville	Florida State	3	Florida	2
141	March 10, 1990	Tallahassee	Florida State	5	Florida	3
142	March 11, 1990	Tallahassee	Florida State	7	Florida	6
143	March 9, 1991	Tallahassee	Florida State	8	Florida	3
144	March 10, 1991	Tallahassee	Florida State	5	Florida	3
145	April 16, 1991	Gainesville	Florida State	4	Florida	2
146	April 17, 1991	Gainesville	Florida	4	Florida State	3
147	June 2, 1991††	Omaha	Florida	5	Florida State	0
148	February 19, 1992	Gainesville	Florida State	2	Florida	1
149	April 8, 1992	Tallahassee	Florida State	4	Florida	0
150	April 15, 1992	Tallahassee	Florida	3	Florida State	1
151	May 5, 1992	Gainesville	Florida State	4	Florida	1
152	March 4, 1993	Tallahassee	Florida State	2	Florida	0
153	March 5, 1993	Tallahassee	Florida State	9	Florida	3
154	March 6, 1993	Gainesville	Florida State	4	Florida	2
155	March 7, 1993	Gainesville	Florida State	8	Florida	4
156	March 3, 1994	Gainesville	Florida	4	Florida State	0
157	March 4, 1994	Gainesville	Florida State	10	Florida	5
158	March 5, 1994	Tallahassee	Florida State	7	Florida	2
159	March 6, 1994	Tallahassee	Florida	12	Florida State	5
160	March 9, 1995	Tallahassee	Florida State	6	Florida	3
161	March 10, 1995	Tallahassee	Florida State	2	Florida	1
162	March 11, 1995	Gainesville	Florida State	7	Florida	0
163	March 11, 1995	Gainesville	Florida	9	Florida State	3
164	February 29, 1996	Gainesville	Florida State	11	Florida	2
165	March 2, 1996	Tallahassee	Florida	6	Florida State	4
166	March 3, 1996	Tallahassee	Florida	11	Florida State	10
167	June 1, 1996††	Omaha	Florida	5	Florida State	2
168	June 4, 1996††	Omaha	Florida	6	Florida State	4
169	February 27, 1997	Tallahassee	Florida	3	Florida State	2
170	February 28, 1997	Tallahassee	Florida State	10	Florida	8

No.	Date	Location	Winning team		Losing team	
171	March 1, 1997	Gainesville	Florida	13	Florida State	6
172	March 2, 1997	Gainesville	Florida State	9	Florida	5
173	February 21, 1998	Gainesville	Florida	3	Florida State	1
174	February 28, 1998	Tallahassee	Florida State	9	Florida	7
175	March 1, 1998	Tallahassee	Florida	10	Florida State	5
176	February 20, 1999	Tallahassee	Florida	6	Florida State	5
177	February 21, 1999	Tallahassee	Florida State	12	Florida	3
178	February 27, 1999	Gainesville	Florida	4	Florida State	2
179	February 28, 1999	Gainesville	Florida State	8	Florida	4
180	February 19, 2000	Gainesville	Florida State	15	Florida	6
181	February 20, 2000	Gainesville	Florida State	17	Florida	8
182	February 26, 2000	Tallahassee	Florida State	6	Florida	2
183	February 27, 2000	Tallahassee	Florida State	8	Florida	7
184	February 17, 2001	Tallahassee	Florida State	19	Florida	6
185	February 18, 2001	Tallahassee	Florida	6	Florida State	5
186	February 24, 2001	Gainesville	Florida	3	Florida State	2^{10}
187	February 25, 2001	Gainesville	Florida State	13	Florida	11
188	March 1, 2002	Gainesville	Florida State	5	Florida	4
189	March 3, 2002	Tallahassee	Florida State	9	Florida	4
190	March 7, 2003	Tallahassee	Florida State	5	Florida	4
191	March 8, 2003	Tallahassee	Florida State	9	Florida	7
192	March 9, 2003	Gainesville	Florida	9	Florida State	8
193	March 31, 2004	Gainesville	Florida	7	Florida State	6^{11}
194	April 21, 2004	Tallahassee	Florida State	16	Florida	4
195	May 12, 2004	Gainesville	Florida	3	Florida State	2
196	March 30, 2005	Tallahassee	Florida	9	Florida State	2
197	April 19, 2005	Tallahassee	Florida State	4	Florida	2
198	May 3, 2005	Gainesville	Florida State	9	Florida	4
199	June 10, 2005†	Gainesville	Florida	8	Florida State	1
200	June 11, 2005†	Gainesville	Florida	8	Florida State	5
201	February 28, 2006	Gainesville	Florida State	6	Florida	4
202	April 19, 2006	Tallahassee	Florida	8	Florida State	3
203	February 20, 2007	Gainesville	Florida State	14	Florida	6
204	April 3, 2007	Jacksonville	Florida	16	Florida State	7

No.	Date	Location	Winning team		Losing team	
205	April 18, 2007	Tallahassee	Florida	5	Florida State	4
206	March 18, 2008	Gainesville	Florida	6	Florida State	1
207	April 1, 2008	Jacksonville	Florida State	10	Florida	2
208	April 15, 2008	Tallahassee	Florida State	4	Florida	2
209	May 31, 2008†	Tallahassee	Florida State	17	Florida	11
210	March 17, 2009	Gainesville	Florida	10	Florida State	2
211	March 31, 2009	Jacksonville	Florida State	3	Florida	2^{5}
212	April 14, 2009	Tallahassee	Florida	5	Florida State	4
213	March 2, 2010	Tampa	Florida State	10	Florida	5
214	March 16, 2010	Gainesville	Florida	8	Florida State	5
215	March 30, 2010	Jacksonville	Florida State	7	Florida	2
216	April 13, 2010	Tallahassee	Florida State	3	Florida	2
217	June 21, 2010††	Omaha	Florida State	8	Florida	5
218	March 1, 2011	Tampa	Florida State	5	Florida	3
219	March 15, 2011	Gainesville	Florida	5	Florida State	4^{10}
220	March 29, 2011	Jacksonville	Florida State	5	Florida	2
221	April 12, 2011	Tallahassee	Florida State	3	Florida	1
222	March 13, 2012	Gainesville	Florida	9	Florida State	2
223	March 27, 2012	Jacksonville	Florida	4	Florida State	1
224	April 10, 2012	Tallahassee	Florida	6	Florida State	3
225	March 12, 2013	Gainesville	Florida State	4	Florida	1
226	March 26, 2013	Jacksonville	Florida State	2	Florida State	1
227	April 9, 2013	Tallahassee	Florida	4	Florida State	3
228	March 18, 2014	Gainesville	Florida	3	Florida State	1
229	March 25, 2014	Jacksonville	Florida	4	Florida State	1
230	April 8, 2014	Tallahassee	Florida	8	Florida State	0
231	March 17, 2015	Gainesville	Florida	14	Florida State	8
232	March 31, 2015	Jacksonville	Florida State	8	Florida	3
233	April 14, 2015	Tallahassee	Florida State	4	Florida	3^{12}
234	June 5, 2015†	Gainesville	Florida	13	Florida State	5
235	June 6, 2015†	Gainesville	Florida	11	Florida State	4
236	March 15, 2016	Gainesville	Florida	6	Florida State	0
237	March 29, 2016	Jacksonville	Florida	3	Florida State	2
238	April 12, 2016	Tallahassee	Florida	8	Florida State	2

No.	Date	Location	Winning team		Losing team	
239	June 11, 2016†	Gainesville	Florida State	3	Florida	0
240	June 12, 2016†	Gainesville	Florida	5	Florida State	0
241	June 13, 2016†	Gainesville	Florida	7	Florida State	0
242	March 14, 2017	Gainesville	Florida	1	Florida State	0
243	March 28, 2017	Jacksonville	Florida	4	Florida State	1
244	April 11, 2017	Tallahassee	Florida	10	Florida State	7
245	March 13, 2018	Gainesville	Florida	12	Florida State	6
246	March 27, 2018	Jacksonville	Florida	1	Florida State	0
247	April 10, 2018	Tallahassee	Florida	6	Florida State	3
248	March 12, 2019	Gainesville	Florida	20	Florida State	7
249	March 26, 2019	Jacksonville	Florida	4	Florida State	2
250	April 9, 2019	Tallahassee	Florida	3	Florida State	1
251	March 10, 2020	Gainesville	Florida State	2	Florida	0
252	March 16, 2021	Tallahassee	Florida State	10	Florida	2
253	April 13, 2021	Gainesville	Florida	3	Florida State	2^{10}
254	March 29, 2022	Jacksonville	Florida	6	Florida State	3
255	April 12, 2022	Tallahassee	Florida State	5	Florida	0
256	May 17, 2022	Gainesville	Florida	7	Florida State	5^{10}
257	March 21, 2023	Tallahassee	Florida	9	Florida State	5
258	April 11, 2023	Gainesville	Florida	5	Florida State	3
259	May 2, 2023	Jacksonville	Florida	7	Florida State	5
260	March 12, 2024	Gainesville	Florida State	12	Florida	8
261	March 26, 2024	Jacksonville	Florida State	14	Florida	3^{8}
262	April 9, 2024	Tallahassee	Florida State	19	Florida	4^{7}
263	March 11, 2025	Tallahassee	Florida	7	Florida State	2
264	March 25, 2025	Jacksonville	Florida State	8	Florida	4
265	April 8, 2025	Gainesville	Florida	5	Florida State	4
266	March 10, 2026	Gainesville	Florida	6	Florida State	3
267	March 24, 2026	Jacksonville	Florida	5	Florida State	0
268	April 7, 2026	Tallahassee	Florida	4	Florida State	3
Series: Florida State leads 135–132–1
† NCAA Division I baseball tournament ††College World Series
