= Atlantic Coast Conference Baseball Pitcher of the Year =

- Awarded for: the most outstanding baseball pitcher in the Atlantic Coast Conference
- Country: United States
- First award: 2005
- Currently held by: Wes Mendes, Florida State

The Atlantic Coast Conference Baseball Pitcher of the Year is a baseball award given to the Atlantic Coast Conference's most outstanding pitcher. The award was first given after the 2005 season.

== Key ==
*	Awarded a national Player of the Year award: the Dick Howser Trophy or the Golden Spikes Award
Player (X)	Denotes the number of times the player had been awarded the Pitcher of the Year award at that point

== Winners ==
Season	Player	School	Reference
2005	Cesar Carrillo	Miami (FL)	
2006	Andrew Miller	North Carolina	
2007	Bryan Henry	Florida State	
2008	Alex White	North Carolina	
2009	Deck McGuire	Georgia Tech	
2010	Danny Hultzen	Virginia	
2011	Danny Hultzen (2)	Virginia	
2012	Carlos Rodon	NC State	
2013	Kent Emanuel	North Carolina	
2014	Nathan Kirby	Virginia	
2014	Chris Diaz	Miami (FL)	
2015	Matthew Crownover	Clemson	
2016	Drew Harrington	Louisville	
2017	J. B. Bukauskas	North Carolina	
2018	Brian Brown	NC State	
2019	Reid Detmers	Louisville	
2020	Season canceled due the COVID-19 pandemic, no awards given		
2021	Parker Messick	Florida State	
2022	Rhett Lowder	Wake Forest	
2023	Rhett Lowder (2)	Wake Forest	
2024	Chase Burns	Wake Forest	
2025	Jake Knapp	North Carolina	
2026	Wes Mendes	Florida State	

== Winners by school ==
School (year joined)	Winners	Years
North Carolina (1953)	5	2006, 2008, 2013, 2017, 2025
Florida State (1991)	3	2007, 2021, 2026
Virginia (1953)	3	2010, 2011, 2014
Wake Forest (1953)	3	2022, 2023, 2024
Miami (FL) (2004)	2	2005, 2014
Georgia Tech (1978)	1	2009
NC State (1953)	2	2012, 2018
Clemson (1953)	1	2015
Louisville (2014)	2	2016, 2019
Boston College (2005)	0	—
California (2025)	0	—
Duke (1953)	0	—
Maryland (1953)^{[a]}	0	—
Notre Dame (2013)	0	—
Pittsburgh (2013)	0	—
Stanford (2025)	0	—
Virginia Tech (2004)	0	—

== Footnotes ==
- ^{a} The University of Maryland left the ACC in 2014 to join the Big Ten Conference.
