= Wes Mendes =

American baseball player (born 2004)

Houston Astros
- Pitcher
- Born: October 4, 2004 (age 22); Tampa, Florida, U.S.
- Bats: Left Throws: Left
- Stats at Baseball Reference

Wesley Charles Mendes (born October 4, 2004) is an American professional baseball pitcher in the Houston Astros organization.

== Amateur career ==
Mendes attended Jesuit High School in Tampa, Florida. As a senior in 2023, he hit .404 with five home runs alongside pitching to a 4–0 record and 1.48 ERA. He originally committed to play college baseball at Vanderbilt University for the Vanderbilt Commodores but later switched his commitment to the University of Mississippi to play for the Ole Miss Rebels.

As a freshman for Ole Miss in 2024, Mendes appeared in 17 games and went 2–1 with a 6.82 ERA, 43 strikeouts, and one save over 31 2/3 innings. After the season, he entered the transfer portal and committed to Florida State University to play for the Florida State Seminoles. In 2025, he made 16 starts for the Seminoles and had a 7–3 record, a 5.42 ERA, and 90 strikeouts over 78 innings. Mendes was named Florida State's Opening Day starter for the 2026 season. Mendes finished the season with a 9–3 record, a 2.81 ERA, and 125 strikeouts across 93 innings pitched and was named an All-American by Baseball America, the American Baseball Coaches Association, Perfect Game and the National Collegiate Baseball Writers Association. He was also named the Atlantic Coast Conference Baseball Pitcher of the Year. After the season, he was invited to attend the 2026 MLB Draft Combine at Chase Field.

== Professional career ==
Mendes was selected by the Houston Astros in the second round with the 57th overall pick of the 2026 Major League Baseball draft. He signed with the Astros for a $1.67 million signing bonus.
