= Myles Bailey =

American baseball player (born 2005)

Chicago Cubs
- First Baseman
- Born: July 7, 2005 (age 21); Tallahassee, FL, U.S.
- Bats: Left Throws: Right
- Stats at Baseball Reference

Myles Bailey (born July 7, 2005) is an American professional baseball first baseman in the Chicago Cubs organization. He played college baseball for the Florida State Seminoles.

== Amateur career ==
Myles grew up in Tallahassee, Florida and attended Lincoln High School. He committed to Florida State in 2021. In 2023, he was named the All-Big Bend Player of the Year, hitting .389 with 28 hits and 10 home runs as a junior at Lincoln. Bailey was ranked the no. 37 overall player and no. 1 first baseman in the 2024 recruiting class by Perfect Game. Before his freshman year at Florida State, he was drafted in the 20th round by the Chicago White Sox during the 2024 Major League Baseball draft. He decided to forgo the draft and sign with the Seminoles.

In Bailey's freshman season as a Seminole, he started 56 games as a first baseman hitting .327 with 66 hits, 11 doubles, and 56 RBI. He also had 19 home runs, which was the second highest in the Atlantic Coast Conference. Bailey received post-season honors when he was recognized on the ACC All-Freshman Team and named a Baseball America All-American. He was also invited to the 2025 USA Baseball Collegiate National Team Training Camp in Cary, North Carolina. In 2025, he played collegiate summer baseball with the Hyannis Harbor Hawks of the Cape Cod Baseball League.

== Professional career ==
Bailey was recognized as a top prospect for the 2026 Major League Baseball draft as he was on MLB Pipeline's Top 100 Draft Prospects for 2026. He was drafted with the 75th pick in the draft by the Chicago Cubs. A week later, he signed with the Cubs for an over-slot signing bonus of $1.9 million.
